= A Queer Carol =

A Queer Carol is a 1999 theatrical adaptation of Charles Dickens's classic 1843 novella A Christmas Carol retold in a gay perspective, written by Joe Godfrey. It is the "first openly gay version" of A Christmas Carol, wrote Curt Holman of Creative Loafing. It workshopped in Buffalo in December 1999 and then premiered in Manhattan in December 2001 and the rest of the United States onward.

== Plot ==
A "successful but stingy" interior designer Ebenezer "Ben" Scrooge underpays his assistant Bob Cratchit, depriving him from health care benefits for himself and his HIV-positive partner Tim. One day, he turns down a charity worker's offer to fund Broadway Cares/Equity Fights AIDS. Later at night, Scrooge encounters the ghost of his business partner and former lover Jacob "Jake" Marley (né Markowitz), who warns Scrooge about his greed and that the three spirits will visit him.

The ghost of Marilyn Monroe (as the Ghost of Christmas Past) takes Scrooge back to his 1950s childhood, where he had artistic aspirations as a child, praised by his mother. Ben's alcoholic father belittled him for it, and some of his classmates bullied him, contributing to Scrooge's internalized homophobia. Later, 21-year-old Ben worked for Fezziwig Fabrics (owned by Old Fezziwig), where Ben met another worker Jacob Markowitz. Both then became business partners and lovers. They eventually bought out Fezziwig's business. Their relationship, however, became strained. Scrooge wanted to remain closeted, and Jake shifted toward drugs and sex, leading Jake to suffer and then die from AIDS complications.

Afterwards, the Ghost of Christmas Present (in form of a drag queen) shows Scrooge the present-day scenes of Bob Cratchit and Tim and their friends celebrating Christmas, and then the Ghost of Christmas Future reveals Tim's and Scrooge's own death, prompting Scrooge to change his ways for the better.

== Characters ==
=== Major ===
- Ebenezer "Ben" Scrooge – interior designer with internalized homophobia
- Ghost of Christmas Past – Marilyn Monroe, references Monroe's life and career throughout the play
- Ghost of Christmas Present – talkative drag queen
- Jacob "Jake" Marley – Ben's unfaithful lover and business partner who died of AIDS complications
- Robert "Bob" Cratchit – Ben's underpaid assistant who lacks health care
- Tim – Bob's younger boyfriend who is HIV positive

=== Minor ===
- Blake
- Boy Scrooge
- Carol
- a Fence
- Fezziwig
- Fred
- Jean
- Maria
- Nick
- Noel
- Nurse
- Pytor
- Scrooge's Father
- Scrooge's Mother
- Svetlana
- Young Scrooge

The actor who plays Jake also plays Blake, and the actor who plays Tim also plays Young Scrooge and Boy Scrooge. Scrooge's Father, Nick, Noel, and a Fence are all played by "Man 1", while Fred, Fezziwig, and Pytor are all played by "Man 2". The same is done with the women – Svetlana, Christmas Past, and Carol are all played by "Woman 1" and Scrooge's Mother, Maria, Jean, and Nurse are all played by "Woman 2".

Ghost of Christmas Future is not a character as much as it is stage directions; it is represented through ominous music, sound, and light effects.

== Staging ==
The stage unit set up is simple – a few tables and chairs is sufficient. Godfrey states within the Production Notes that while A Queer Carol is set in Manhattan, theatre companies and directors can change specifics to reflect their own location.

== Production history ==
In a statement, playwright Joe Godfrey said "I have always thought that a contemporary spin on this wonderful story would be appropriate for the gay and lesbian community. We have our Cratchits, our Tims, our Fezziwigs and certainly our own Scrooges."

=== 1999 Buffalo workshop ===
A Queer Carol was work shopped throughout December 1999 at the New Phoenix Theater in Buffalo, New York. Richard Lambert was the Artistic Director.

=== 2001 New York City premiere ===
A Queer Carol had its New York City premiere on December 6, 2001, at the Duplex Cabaret Theatre by SourceWorks Theatre. Mark Cannistraro was the artistic director.

Cast

- Bob Cratchit – J.D Lynch
- Ebenezer Scrooge – John Marino
- Ghost of Christmas Present – Michael Lynch
- Jake/Blake – Henry David Clarke
- Man 1 – Nathan Johnson
- Man 2 – Yaakov Sullivan
- Tim/Young Scrooge – Danny Pintauro
- Woman 1/Ghost of Christmas Past – Cynthia Pierce
- Woman 2 – Virginia Baeta

=== Other performances ===
Since its 2001 premiere at the Duplex Cabaret Theatre, A Queer Carol had been performed around the United States, including Arizona, Georgia, Tennessee, and Wisconsin. One of the most recent productions was at the Metropolitan Community Church of Tampa, Florida, and ran in December 2016.

== Reception ==
TheaterMania reviewer Dan Bacalzo in 2001 found the play "surprisingly effective, infusing the holiday classic with camp sensibility without losing the spirit and meaning of the story," yet criticized playwright Joe Godfrey's script for being sometimes "a little too cute and predictable with his jokes" and "cheesy references to [Marilyn] Monroe's life and career". Bacalzo also criticized the Duplex Cabaret Theatre (New York City) production's "limitations of the staging" and attributed to "a non-movable piano" for making most scenes occur at "directly [the] center stage in a semi-presentational [sic] manner." Nevertheless, he praised the ensemble cast's acting and own portrayals of multiple parts, including actor Danny Pintauro's portrayal of young Scrooge. He further wrote that many audiences except "purists" of the original novel would enjoy the play adaptation.

Mark E. Leib wrote his criticisms in 2005 regarding the Florida production, "The script is mediocre, much of the acting is regrettable, and there's nothing very pleasing about the costume or set design." StageSceneLA reviewer Steven Stanley in 2010 praised the "good" adaptation, even when not "perfect", yet Stanley found "some of [Godfrey's] campier jokes" weak, "young Scrooge's switch from sweet to cold-hearted" not well developed, and "the 'contemporary' setting [...] tad dated with terms like 'lover' and references to [...] Kitty Carlisle." However, Stanley also praised Christopher Peduzzi's portrayal of Scrooge in the Theatre Out (Santa Ana, California) production.

== See also ==
- Adaptations of A Christmas Carol
