= A Christmas Carol: A Ghost Story =

2021 stage adaptation

- Poster for the cinema release of A Christmas Carol: A Ghost Story (2022)
- Written by: Mark Gatiss
- Based on: A Christmas Carol by Charles Dickens
- Original language: English
- Setting: London

Premiere
- Date premiered: 29 October 2021
- Place premiered: Nottingham Playhouse

A Christmas Carol: A Ghost Story is a play based on the 1843 novella of the same name by Charles Dickens, adapted for the stage by Mark Gatiss.

== Synopsis ==
On Christmas Eve, seven years after the death of his partner Jacob Marley, the solitary miser Ebenezer Scrooge receives a visit from the ghost of his former partner. Fettered in heavy chains as a consequence for a lifetime of greed, Marley tells Scrooge that it isn't too late for Scrooge to save himself from the same fate by changing his ways. To do so, however, he must first face three more ghosts.

== Cast and characters ==
Character	Nottingham and London		Birmingham	London
Character	2021	2023	2024	2025
Ebenezer Scrooge	Nicholas Farrell	Keith Allen	Matthew Cottle	Matthew Cottle
Jacob Marley/Old Joe/Ghost of Christmas Yet to Come	Mark Gatiss	Peter Forbes	Rufus Hound	Neil Morrissey
Fred/Young Scrooge	James Backway	James Backway	Lance West	Lance West
Ghost of Christmas Past	Joni Ayton-Kent	Bettrys Jones	Grace Hogg-Robinson	Grace Daly
Ghost of Christmas Present/Fezziwig	Joe Shire	Joe Shire	Mark Theodore	Mark Theodore
Tiny Tim	Zak Ford-Williams	Ryan Weston	Ryan Weston	Elliot Douglas
Belle	Aoife Gaston	Angelina Chudi	Kalifa Taylor	Kalifa Taylor
Caroline	Angelina Chudi	Leona Allen	Karendip Phull	Michaela Bennison
Narrator/Tim	Christopher Godwin	Geoffrey Beevers	Geoffrey Beevers	Michael Mears
Bob Cratchit	Edward Harrison	Edward Harrison	Oscar Batterham	Henry Davis
Mrs Cratchit	Sarah Ridgeway	Rebecca Trehearn	Rebecca Trehearn	Charlotte Bate
Grace Cratchit	Renae Rhodes Esmé Tchoudi	Madison Spencer-Ogiorumua Ava-Jade Wolstenholme	Sophie John Corrina Onyiukah Orla Rae Wilson	
Edwin Cratchit	Lauren Tanner Charlie Westlake	William Barker Charlie Westlake	Takunda Khumalo River Mahjouri Logan Meers	

== Production history ==
=== Nottingham and London (2021) ===
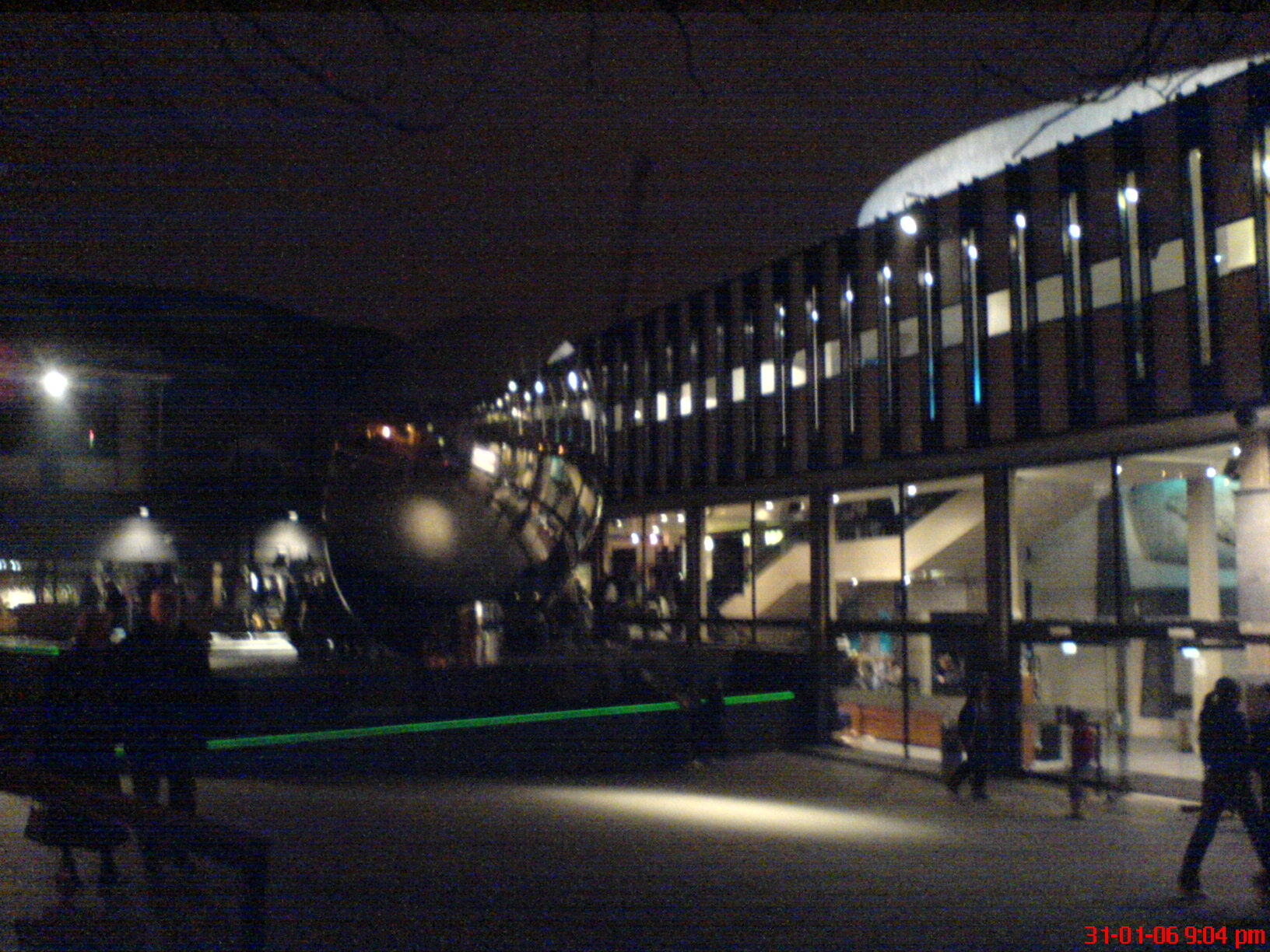
Nottingham Playhouse by night

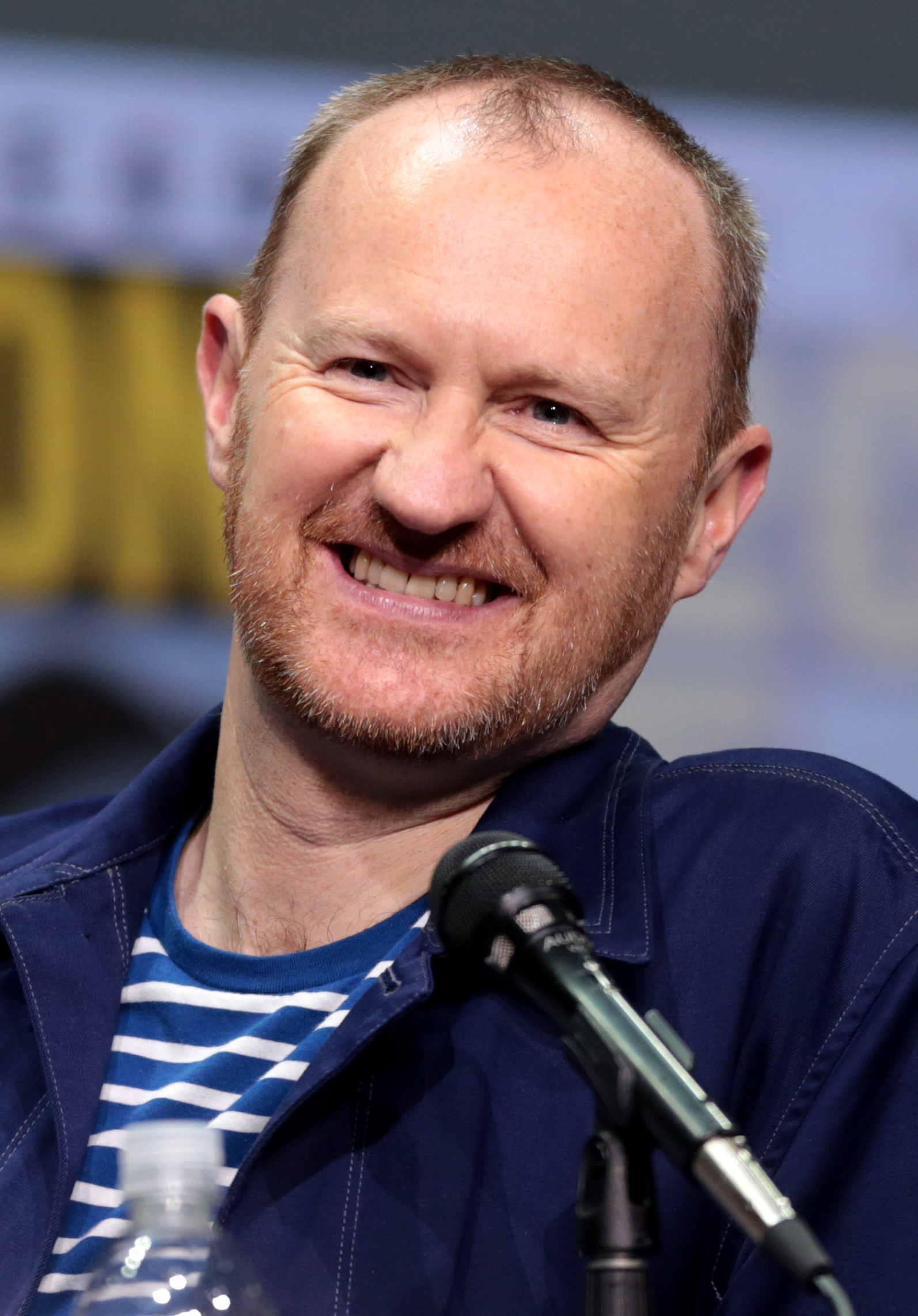
Mark Gatiss adapted the drama and appeared in the original production as Jacob Marley, among other roles

The adaptation was directed by Adam Penford, designed by Paul Wills with a lighting design by Philip Gladwell, sound design by Ella Wahlström, video design by Nina Dunn, movement direction by Georgina Lamb and composition by Tingying Dong.

The production was originally scheduled to open in 2020 but was delayed due to the COVID-19 pandemic. It was eventually produced at the Nottingham Playhouse from 29 October to 20 November 2021 before transferring to the Alexandra Palace in London where it ran from 26 November 2021 to 9 January 2022 with a cast of 15 playing 50 characters, including Nicholas Farrell as Scrooge and Gatiss as Marley. The production was filmed live for a cinema release during the run in London and received a cinema release on 27 November and 1 December 2022 before it was shown on BBC Four on 25 December 2022.

=== Nottingham and London revival (2023) ===
The production was revived at the Nottingham Playhouse from 28 October to 18 November 2023, before transferring again to the Alexandra Palace from 24 November 2023 to 7 January 2024. It starred Keith Allen as Scrooge with Peter Forbes as Marley.

=== Birmingham (2024) ===
The production played at the Birmingham Repertory Theatre for their annual Christmas show from 14 November 2024 until 5 January 2025. It starred Matthew Cottle as Scrooge and Rufus Hound as Marley.

=== London revival (2025) ===
It was announced that the production will be revived again at the Alexandra Palace from 22 November 2025 until 4 January 2026. It will star Cottle reprising the role of Scrooge from the Birmingham run and Neil Morrissey as Marley.

== Differences from the novella ==
Similar to the 2017 Old Vic adaptation, a scene is added in which a reformed Scrooge briefly reunites with Belle, the love of his life, who ended their engagement in their youth after he started to become greedy. The two exchange Christmas greetings before Belle parts ways with her family. Throughout the story, an elderly narrator tells the story. Towards the end, when speaking about Scrooge's change and how he came to embody Christmas, he starts to get emotional; the narrator is then revealed to be an adult Tiny Tim relaying Scrooge's story to his grandchildren.

== Critical reception ==
Giving the stage show three stars out of five, Arifa Akbar, the critic for The Guardian, wrote:

Gatiss's script is surprisingly faithful, given his flair for imaginative reworks of canonical stories (from Dracula to Sherlock), and some dialogue is unchanged along with the words of the narrator (Christopher Godwin). This reminds us of the inherent theatricality in Dickens's storytelling, heightened with the use of puppets and some bewitching surprises such as a delightful cloud of ghosts that suddenly emerge and swing around the auditorium...

Some key moments feel too fleeting and don't carry enough emotion, including Tiny Tim's deathbed scene. But when the human drama slows down, it gains an emotional catch, such as a romantic pause between Belle (Aoife Gaston) and the young Scrooge, and the final scene between Scrooge and Bob Cratchit (Edward Harrison); we wish for a few more of these.

The end brings a clever twist and a great surge in festive feeling, with carol singing and general good cheer.

Mark Brown of The Daily Telegraph was rather more generous, giving the production five stars out of five. He wrote:

"While the production (sub-headed 'A Ghost Story') is utterly, and fabulously, theatrical, Gatiss has, as if in reverence to Dickens's original stage prose presentations, inserted a narrator (played as an all-knowing Cockney by Christopher Godwin). This storyteller enables Gatiss – who also plays the ill-fated ghost of Scrooge's former business partner Jacob Marley – to both dramatise the dialogue of the novella, whilst giving expression to some of the finest passages of Dickens's prose...

The story that then unfolds is told by a fine cast of no fewer than 15 actors. The improbably versatile set is transformed into the various locations of Scrooge's nocturnal and spiritual journeys with the assistance of top-class video projections and superb stage illusions... ethereal ghosts fly over the heads of the audience by means of the simplest of puppet-making techniques. On the other, some very smart video work gives a spectacular visual dimension to the arrival of Marley's chain-clanking apparition.

== See also ==
- Adaptations of A Christmas Carol
