= The Misadventures of the Wholesome Twins =

The Misadventures of the Wholesome Twins is a musical with book and lyrics by Jason Vitteri-Lewis and music by Vitteri-Lewis and Walter Frasier. It premiered as a showcase at The Duplex in New York's West Village in July 2005, followed by a full-length two-month run the same year. The show opened at Don't Tell Mama, the Theater District's best known cabaret on October 24, 2005. The formal run cast included Liza Marie Johnston, Heather Michele Lawler, TJ Besler, Robyn Kay Pilarski, Joel Peterson, Drew Tessier, Anthony Aloise, Julie Marcus and Alanna Wilson. The show closed on December 19, 2005, after four previews and 22 regular performances. The show was produced by Stacy Lerman/Creative Stage.

Originally, the musical was titled The Misadventures of the Olsen Twins. Producers had to change the title of the show to avoid any legal recourse and to publicize it as a parody.

== Plot ==
Misadventures is a parody of the lives of Mary-Kate and Ashley Olsen, loosely woven through the plots of the 1946 film It's A Wonderful Life and Charles Dickens' 1843 novella A Christmas Carol. When the secret of their conjoined birth is revealed, a series of events unfolds that jeopardizes their billion dollar empire, driving them to a dramatic break-up. As one pursues a sister-less career, the other overdoses and slips into a Christmas Eve coma. Throughout the evening, three unlikely spirits (Bob Saget as the 'Ghost of Christmas Then', Courtney Love as the 'Ghost of Christmas Now' and Rick James as the 'Ghost of Christmas Round-The-Bend') attempt to show her what is worth more as she is offered a life-changing decision which could alter the course of Hollywood history forever. The entire second act has the cast performing as the characters and actors of ABC's family sitcom Full House.

== Characters ==
- MK Wholesome - Liza Marie Johnston
- Ashleigh Wholesome - Heather Michele Lawler
- Boyfriend/Rick James - TJ Besler
- Suit/Ensemble - Anthony Aloise
- Bob Saget/Ensemble - Joel Peterson
- Courtney Love/Ensemble - Robyn Kay Pilarski
- Dave Coulier/Ensemble - Drew Tessier
- Candace Cameron/Ensemble - Julie Marcus
- Jodie Sweetin - Alanna Wilson

Showcase Performers: Liza Marie Johnston, Ginger Kroll, Brett Rigby, Tony Cartwright, Robyn Kay Pilarski, Brendan Irving, Brooke Hoover, Heather Michele Lawler, Jason Vitteri-Lewis, Matthew Quinn, Allison Carter Thomas, Robyn Gabrielle Lee (narrator)

== Song list ==
Act I

1. It's Wonderfully, Amazing, Ultra Super-Cool To Be Us (MK, Ashleigh, Ensemble)
2. Something Isn't Right Here (Boyfriend, Suit)
3. Kiss L.A. Goodbye (MK, Ashleigh)
4. The Newest News (Reporters)
5. Which One Do I Love? (Boyfriend)
6. Back on the Wagon (MK, Ensemble)
7. If She'd Never Been Born (MK, Ashleigh, Therapist)
8. I Wish I Were An Only Child (Ashleigh)

Act II

1. 49% (Ensemble)
2. Free (MK, Ashleigh)
3. No More Christmases For Me (MK)
4. What Happened to Us? (Full House Cast)
5. Follow My Lead (Courtney Love, MK)
6. Love Ya Sista, Bitch! (Rick James, Full House Cast)
7. The Mirror of Myself (MK, Ashleigh)
8. God Bless The Twins/Wonderfully Amazing reprise (Ensemble)

== Critical reception ==
The Misadventures of the Wholesome Twins sold out of its showcase but did not find as much success in a full-length production. Its sketch comedy style seemed better suited for the short form musical review. Critical response was mixed with reviewers able to find silver linings around the show's flaws. Sarah Bolson, theatre critic for OffOffOnline.com wrote:

"...a self-proclaimed work of camp, the outlandish story filled with requisite cliches: drugs, money and a white Rick James, adds to its charm."

and

"What Lewis has done right is creating a show that at once appeals to those who hate and love celebrity culture."

== See also ==
- Adaptations of A Christmas Carol
