= The Muppet Christmas Carol =

1992 film directed by Brian Henson

- Theatrical release poster by Drew Struzan
- Directed by: Brian Henson
- Screenplay by: Jerry Juhl
- Based on: The Muppet Show by Jim Henson A Christmas Carol by Charles Dickens
- Produced by: Brian Henson; Martin G. Baker
- Starring: Michael Caine; Dave Goelz; Steve Whitmire; Jerry Nelson; Frank Oz
- Cinematography: John Fenner
- Edited by: Michael Jablow
- Music by: Miles Goodman (score); Paul Williams (songs)
- Production companies: Walt Disney Pictures; Jim Henson Productions
- Distributed by: Buena Vista Pictures Distribution
- Release date: December 11, 1992
- Running time: 86 minutes
- Country: United States
- Language: English
- Budget: $12 million
- Box office: $34.5 million

The Muppet Christmas Carol is a 1992 American Christmas musical film produced and directed by Brian Henson (in his feature directorial debut). It is the fourth theatrical film featuring the Muppets. Adapted from the 1843 novella A Christmas Carol by Charles Dickens with a screenplay written by Jerry Juhl, the film takes artistic license to suit the aesthetic of the Muppets, but closely follows Dickens' original story. It is the first Muppet film where a human is the main protagonist.

The film stars Michael Caine as Ebenezer Scrooge alongside Muppet performers Dave Goelz, Steve Whitmire, Jerry Nelson, and Frank Oz. It is the first Muppet film to be produced following the deaths of Muppets creator Jim Henson and performer Richard Hunt; the film is dedicated to both.

The film was released in the United States on December 11, 1992, by Buena Vista Pictures Distribution under its Walt Disney Pictures label. It was a modest box office success and received generally favorable reviews. It is the first Muppets film to be produced by Disney, whose parent company would later acquire the rights to the Muppets characters and assets in 2004. The film's reputation has grown in the years since its release, and it is often listed as one of the best Christmas films of all time.

== Plot ==
Charles Dickens (Gonzo) and his friend Rizzo serve as narrators of the story of Ebenezer Scrooge, a greedy, penny-pinching and lonely moneylender of 19th-century London, who does not share the merriment of Christmas. On Christmas Eve, he rejects his nephew Fred's invitation to Christmas dinner, dismisses two gentlemen (Bunsen Honeydew and Beaker) collecting money for charity, and hurls a wreath at a carol-singing Bean Bunny. His kind, humble employee Bob Cratchit (Kermit the Frog) and the other bookkeepers request not to work on Christmas Day, since there will be no business for Scrooge on the day, to which he reluctantly agrees.

That night, Scrooge encounters the shackled ghosts of his late business partners, Jacob and Robert Marley (Statler and Waldorf), in his bed chambers. They warn him to repent of his wicked ways, or be condemned to wear chains and suffer in the afterlife as they do. They tell Scrooge that three spirits will visit him during the night to help him change his ways.

At one o'clock, Scrooge is visited by the childlike Ghost of Christmas Past, who shows him visions of his childhood and early adult life. Along with Dickens and Rizzo, they visit his lonely school days and then his time as an employee at Fozziwig's (Fozzie Bear) rubber chicken factory. There, at Fozziwig's Christmas party, Scrooge meets a young woman named Belle, with whom he falls in love but she leaves him as he chooses money over her. A despondent Scrooge tells the Ghost to leave him and is returned to his home.

Scrooge next meets the gigantic, merry Ghost of Christmas Present, who shows him the joys and wonders of Christmas Day. Scrooge and the Ghost visit Fred's house, where Scrooge is made fun of for his stinginess and general ill will toward all. Scrooge and the spirit then visit Bob Cratchit's house, learning his family is content with the little they have. Scrooge also takes pity on Bob's ill son Tiny Tim (Robin the Frog), whom the Ghost comments will soon die if things continue the way they are.

The Ghost leaves Scrooge to the mysterious Ghost of Christmas Yet to Come, who takes Scrooge into the future where a recent death elicits no sympathy from the inhabitants of London, and the stolen possessions of the deceased are sold to a fence named Old Joe. Due to the creepy atmosphere, the narrators decide to leave. The Ghost also shows Scrooge the Cratchits' home, where they find Bob and his family mourning the death of Tiny Tim. Scrooge is led to the cemetery, where the Ghost points out the neglected grave of the unloved man; Scrooge wipes the snow away on the tombstone to see that it bears his name. Horrified, Scrooge tearfully vows to change his ways and suddenly finds himself back in his bedroom.

Finding it is Christmas Day, an overjoyed Scrooge begins spreading happiness and joy around London, agreeing to give money to the gentlemen's charity, reconciling with Fred and his wife, and leaving coals for his bookkeepers. The narrators return to resume the story. Scrooge tells Bean to buy the poulterer's prize turkey, and they, along with Dickens, Rizzo, and the gentlemen, deliver it to Bob's family; Scrooge announces to Bob that he will raise his salary and pay off his mortgage, as Dickens tells that Tiny Tim escaped death thanks to Scrooge's new generosity, and everyone celebrates Christmas together.

== Cast ==
- Michael Caine as Ebenezer Scrooge
  - Edward Sanders, Theo Sanders, Kristopher Milnes, Russell Martin, and Ray Coulthard as Young Scrooge
- Steven Mackintosh as Fred, Ebenezer Scrooge's nephew.
- Meredith Braun as Belle, Scrooge's former love interest.
- Robin Weaver as Clara, Ebenezer Scrooge's niece-in-law and Fred's wife.

=== Muppet performers ===
Performer	Muppet character	A Christmas Carol character
Dave Goelz	The Great Gonzo	Charles Dickens (Narrator)
Dave Goelz	Waldorf	Robert Marley
Dave Goelz	Dr. Bunsen Honeydew	Charity collector
Dave Goelz	Zoot	Fozziwig party entertainer
Dave Goelz	Whatnots	Background characters
Dave Goelz	Original	Betina Cratchit
Dave Goelz	Original	Pigs
Dave Goelz	Original	Richmond the Horse
Steve Whitmire	Rizzo the Rat	Co-narrator
Steve Whitmire	Kermit the Frog	Bob Cratchit
Steve Whitmire	Beaker	Charity collector
Steve Whitmire	Bean Bunny	Boy
Steve Whitmire	Lips	Fozziwig party entertainer
Steve Whitmire	Original	Belinda Cratchit
Steve Whitmire	Original	Stage puppeteer
Steve Whitmire	Original	Pigs
Steve Whitmire	Original	Laundress
Frank Oz	Miss Piggy	Emily Cratchit
Frank Oz	Fozzie Bear	Fozziwig
Frank Oz	Sam Eagle	Schoolmaster
Frank Oz	George the Janitor	Himself
Frank Oz	Animal	Fozziwig party entertainer
Frank Oz	Original	Vegetable seller
Frank Oz	Original	Mr. Bitte
Jerry Nelson	Robin the Frog	Tiny Tim Cratchit
Jerry Nelson	Lew Zealand	Himself
Jerry Nelson	Statler	Jacob Marley
Jerry Nelson	Ma Bear	Ma Fozziwig
Jerry Nelson	Floyd Pepper	Fozziwig party entertainer
Jerry Nelson	Dr. Julius Strangepork	Fred's guest
Jerry Nelson	Pops	Background characters
Jerry Nelson	Inkspot	Background characters
Jerry Nelson	Droop	Background characters
Jerry Nelson	Frackle	Background characters
Jerry Nelson	Original	Ghost of Christmas Present (face and voice performance)
Jerry Nelson	Original	Bookkeeper rat
Jerry Nelson	Original	Pigs
Jerry Nelson	Original	Crocodile
Jerry Nelson	Original	Mr. Applegate
Jerry Nelson	Original	Mouse
David Rudman	Original	Peter Cratchit
David Rudman	Original	Old Joe (puppeteer only)
David Rudman	Original	Beggar
David Rudman	The Swedish Chef	Fozziwig party cook
David Rudman	Wander McMooch	Fred's guest
Louise Gold	Original	Mrs. Dilber
Louise Gold	Original	Cockney Woman
Louise Gold	Brool	Fred's guest
Karen Prell	Original	Ghost of Christmas Past (puppeteer only)
Karen Prell	Original	Daughter mouse
Karen Prell	Aretha	Singer in "Scrooge" number
Rob Tygner	Originals	Ghost of Christmas Past (puppeteer only)
Rob Tygner	Originals	Ghost of Christmas Yet to Come (puppeteer only)
William Todd Jones	Original	Ghost of Christmas Past (puppeteer only)
Donald Austen	Originals	Ghost of Christmas Present (in-suit performer)
Donald Austen	Originals	Ghost of Christmas Yet to Come (in-suit performer)
Mike Quinn	Original	Undertaker
Mike Quinn	Original	Pig
Jessica Fox	Originals	Ghost of Christmas Past (voice only)
David Shaw Parker	Originals	Old Joe (voice only)

== Production ==
Following Jim Henson's death in May 1990, the talent agent Bill Haber approached Henson's son Brian, with the idea of filming an adaptation. Haber told Henson that "Christmas Carol is the greatest story of all time, you should do that" and later informed Henson that he had sold the idea to ABC as a television film. The longtime Muppets writer Jerry Juhl was hired to write the script and decided to insert Charles Dickens (portrayed by Gonzo) as the stand-in narrator in order to remain faithful to the original prose of the written material. Henson stated that Gonzo was chosen because he was the least likely choice to play Dickens, while Rizzo the Rat was added to inject some humor and serve as a Greek chorus. Established Muppet characters were initially written to portray the ghosts, with various accounts stating Robin the Frog or Scooter was to be the Ghost of Christmas Past, Miss Piggy to be the Ghost of Christmas Present, and Gonzo (before he was written to portray Dickens) or Animal as the Ghost of Christmas Yet to Come. However, the idea was scrapped in favor of new Muppet characters that would better underline the ghosts' ominous nature. After the script was submitted for approval to ABC, the executives of Walt Disney Pictures offered to purchase the script for a feature film instead of a television release.

The English actors David Hemmings, Ron Moody, and David Warner and the American comedian George Carlin were considered to portray Ebenezer Scrooge. Henson later offered the role to Michael Caine, who replied: "I'm going to play this movie like I'm working with the Royal Shakespeare Company. I will never wink, I will never do anything Muppety. I am going to play Scrooge as if it is an utterly dramatic role and there are no puppets around me." He took inspiration for the role from "Wall Street cheats and embezzlers; I thought they represented a very good picture of meanness and greed."

Production took place at the Shepperton Studios, England. During filming, in order to allow for the Muppets and the human actors to be in the shot, floors had to be removed and re-inserted, with Michael Caine having to walk across narrow planks between the Muppets and their performers. Additionally, the buildings in the London street scenes were constructed by hand but diminished in size in order to achieve the appearance that the streets were relatively longer. When the musical sequence "It Feels Like Christmas" ends with a crane shot, the short buildings became apparent in the background; Brian Henson explained on the DVD audio commentary that they were aware of the problem during shooting, but eventually decided that the closing shot was worth it as they believed not many people would notice the error.

== Release ==
=== Box office ===
Walt Disney Pictures appeared to have high expectations for the film, being their widest-released film of the holiday season and the second-widest release under the Disney banner that year. However, the film opened in sixth place, initially reported to have collected $5.9 million in box office estimates, which was later revised to $5 million. Ultimately, The Muppet Christmas Carol grossed a total of $27.4 million in North America. Despite being a modest box office success, The Muppet Christmas Carol did not have a large effect during its theatrical release, having to face competition from Home Alone 2: Lost in New York and Disney's own Aladdin.

=== Critical response ===
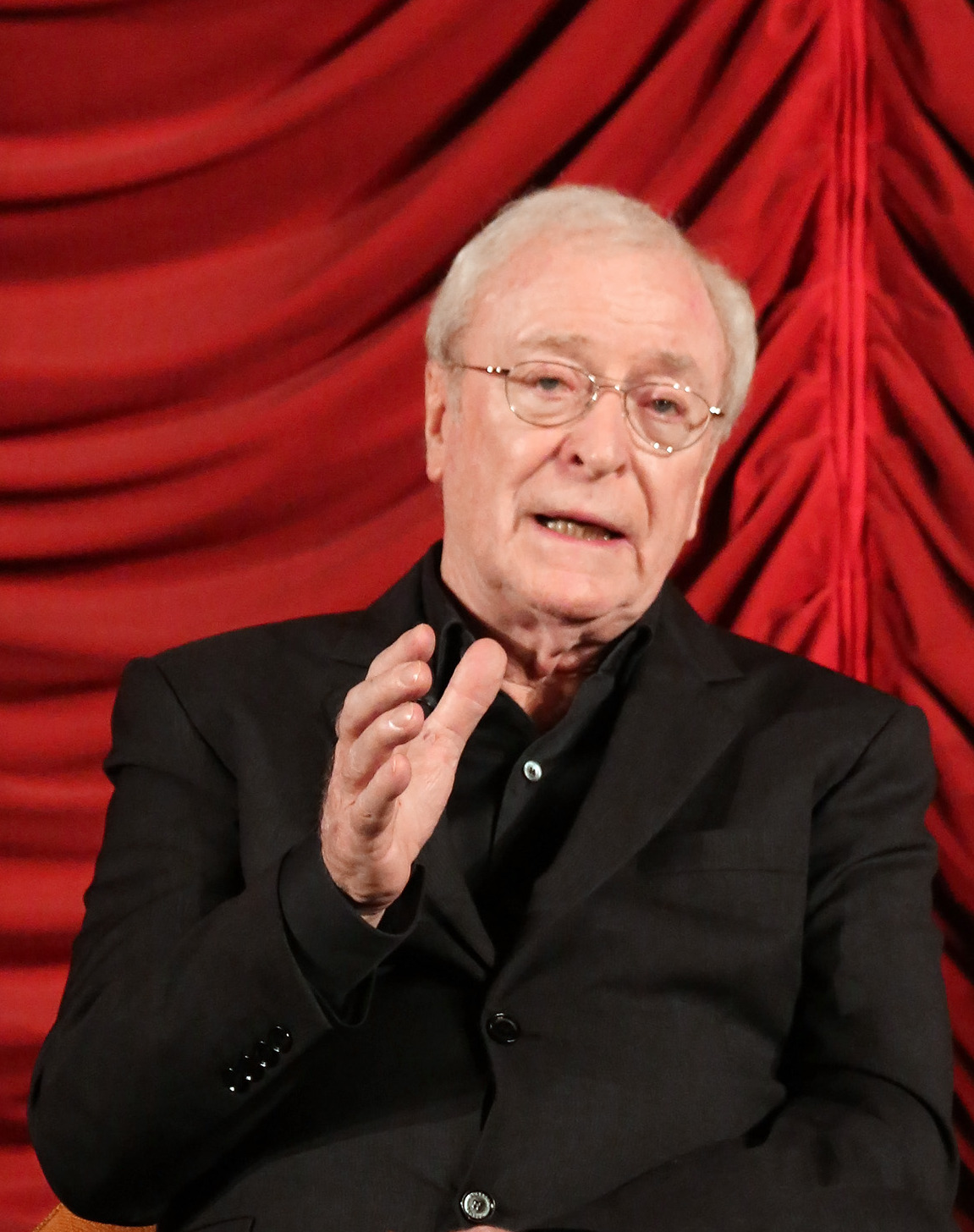
Michael Caine received praise for his performance as Ebenezer Scrooge. Caine has expressed delight over the film.

On Rotten Tomatoes, the film has an approval rating of 79% based on 58 reviews, with an average rating of 7.5/10. The site's critics consensus states, "It may not be the finest version of Charles Dickens' tale to grace the screen, but The Muppet Christmas Carol is funny and heartwarming, and serves as a good introduction to the story for young viewers." On Metacritic, the film has a score of 64 out of 100, based on 27 critics, indicating "generally favorable reviews". Audiences polled by CinemaScore gave the film an average grade of "A" on an A+ to F scale.

Janet Maslin, reviewing for The New York Times, said that there wasn't "great show of wit or tunefulness here, and the ingenious cross-generational touches are fairly rare. But there is a lively kiddie version of the Dickens tale, one that very young viewers ought to understand." Kathleen Carroll of the New York Daily News gave it three and a half stars, calling it "a delightfully imaginative musical adaptation of Charles Dickens' classic tale" and noting that "it's a measure of Michael Caine's talents as an actor that he's able to give a straight-faced, remarkably convincing performance as the notorious tightwad Ebenezer Scrooge while surrounded by pint-sized veteran scene-stealers", though she did write that "the songs by Paul Williams tend to sound exactly alike."

Peter Rainer of the Los Angeles Times said that "die-hard Muppet fans may get a boost from the film but Dickens lovers will fare less well. Somewhere along the way—'round about the Ghost of Christmas Past stuff—the magic has fallen out of the story. The treacly score by Miles Goodman, with songs by Paul Williams, doesn't help. The Muppets are at their best when they're anarchic, without all this soggy whimsy." Norman Wilner of The Toronto Star, in contrast, called the film "one of the most loyal renderings of Dickens", writing that "Caine, who has always been able to fully become the characters he plays, delivers an unexpectedly strong performance as a human being who plays every scene with hand puppets [and] makes us believe he's been relating to the little fuzzies all his life"; however, he had a mixed review of Williams' songs in the film, and was particularly critical of its closing number.

The Chicago Sun-Times film critic Roger Ebert, who gave the film three stars out of four, praised the technical achievements, but felt it "could have done with a few more songs than it has, and the merrymaking at the end might have been carried on a little longer, just to offset the gloom of most of Scrooge's tour through his lifetime spent spreading misery." On the television program Siskel & Ebert, his partner Chicago Tribune film critic Gene Siskel, who did not review the film in print, gave the film a Thumbs Down although he was favorable towards Michael Caine's performance. Also from the Chicago Tribune, Dave Kehr reviewed the film as "a talky, plodding film that seems likely to bore children and adults in equal measure." Nevertheless, Kehr praised Val Strazovec's production design and John Fenner's cinematography believing its "shadowy, naturalistic lighting creates a new look for a puppet film," but derided Paul Williams's songs as unmemorable.

Likewise, Variety praised the production design and criticized Williams's songs, writing Muppets Christmas Carol is "not as enchanting or amusing as the previous entries in the Muppet series. But nothing can really diminish the late Jim Henson's irresistibly appealing characters." Giving the film three stars out of five, Almar Haflidason of the BBC wrote the film is "liberal but fun adaptation of a classic" that "turns out to be quite touching as Muppet movies go. Less pleasing are the forgettable songs that offer both clumsy word construction and dire music that eats away at the aesthetic quality of the movie. But you'll be too busy looking out for the assorted Muppets to care much."

In London, the Evening Standard's Alexander Walker said that "the Muppets pass their first screen test playing characters other than their felt or furry selves with great exuberance." Derek Malcolm of The Guardian was less welcoming, saying that "Scrooge's nightmare is rendered silly and so his turning from swine to saint hasn't the required kick. Not only that, but the jokes are thin on the ground, as if only a certain amount of piss-taking was thought appropriate."

The film has grown in critical acclaim over the years, and was declared "the greatest Christmas film ever made" as well as "among the most glorious of all Dickens adaptations" by The Guardian in 2023. Anthony McGlynn of Screen Rant similarly called The Muppet Christmas Carol "a work of genius on every level" and "the greatest Christmas movie ever made", praising the original songs that were written for the film and Michael Caine's performance as Scrooge. Robert Keeling of Den of Geek praised Caine's performance, the adaptation's use of Gonzo and Rizzo, as well as the various musical songs. It is often ranked among the best Christmas films.

=== Home media ===
This is the first Muppet film co-produced and released by Walt Disney Pictures—and the rights to the Muppets featured in the film would later be purchased by the studio's parent company. In addition to theatrical releases, the film has also been made available on home video formats. It was first released on VHS in the United States on November 5, 1993, in the United Kingdom on November 15 that year, and later on DVD in both countries. The first US DVD release was on October 8, 2002, in a full-screen-only format. Walt Disney Home Entertainment released the film in the US on DVD on November 29, 2005, in conjunction with Kermit the Frog's 50th anniversary celebration; this time the DVD contained both full-screen and widescreen presentations. The UK has also had similar DVD releases.

Walt Disney Studios Home Entertainment released a 20th anniversary collector's edition on Blu-ray, DVD, and digital copy on November 6, 2012. The release does not include the film's extended cut. However, the song "When Love Is Gone" and its accompanying scene can be viewed in its entirety on the full-screen version of the anniversary edition of The Muppet Christmas Carol, though it is cut in the widescreen format.

On December 9, 2022, Disney+ released a 30th anniversary edition via streaming media which includes the song "When Love Is Gone" as an option in its menu.

A story album of the movie was nominated for a Grammy Award for Best Spoken Word Album for Children in 1994.

== Music ==
The film's original score was composed by Miles Goodman with songs written by Paul Williams. Williams previously worked with the Muppets on the soundtrack to The Muppet Movie (1979) in which he and Kenneth Ascher were nominated for an Academy Award for writing "Rainbow Connection". Goodman previously scored several films that were directed by Muppet performer Frank Oz.

=== Soundtrack ===
The Muppet Christmas Carol: Original Motion Picture Soundtrack

Soundtrack album by The Muppets
- Released: November 10, 1992
- Studios: BMG Studios, New York Citywide; Sony Scoring Stage, Culver City
- Genre: Soundtrack
- Label: Jim Henson

The Muppets chronology
The Muppets Take Manhattan: The Original Soundtrack (1984)	The Muppet Christmas Carol: Original Motion Picture Soundtrack (1992)	Muppet Treasure Island: Original Motion Picture Soundtrack (1996)

Professional ratings
Review scores
Source	Rating
AllMusic	4.5/5 stars

The Muppet Christmas Carol: Original Motion Picture Soundtrack contains all of the songs from the film, which were written by Paul Williams, as well as several cues from the score by Miles Goodman. However, most of them are different arrangements than as they are featured in the film. The performances are by the Muppet characters as well as Caine, and the album also includes the songs "Room in Your Heart" and "Chairman of the Board" that were recorded but never filmed. As with all preceding Muppet films, The Muppet Christmas Carol was shot as a musical. The soundtrack album peaked at number 189 on the Billboard 200 chart. The soundtrack was re-released on digital by Walt Disney Records on November 6, 2012.

==== Track listing ====
All tracks are written by Paul Williams (songs) and Miles Goodman (score), except where noted.

No.	Title	Performer	Length
1.	"Overture"		2:29
2.	"Scrooge"	The Muppet Cast	2:27
3.	"Room in Your Heart" (deleted song)	Dr. Bunsen Honeydew and Beaker	1:49
4.	"Good King Wenceslas"	The Muppet Brass Buskers	1:05
5.	"One More Sleep 'Til Christmas"	Kermit	2:50
6.	"Marley and Marley"	Statler and Waldorf	3:13
7.	"Christmas Past"		1:09
8.	"Chairman of the Board" (deleted song)	Sam Eagle	1:50
9.	"Fozziwig's Party"	Dr. Teeth and the Electric Mayhem	2:22
10.	"When Love Is Gone"	Meredith Braun	3:38
11.	"It Feels Like Christmas"	Ghost of Christmas Present	2:42
12.	"Christmas Scat"	Robin and Kermit	0:23
13.	"Bless Us All"	Robin and family	2:50
14.	"Christmas Future"		1:46
15.	"Christmas Morning"		0:57
16.	"Thankful Heart"	Michael Caine and the Cast	2:16
17.	"Finale — When Love Is Found/It Feels Like Christmas"	Ghost of Christmas Present, Caine, the Muppet Cast, Robin	4:01
18.	"When Love Is Gone" (Pop Version)	Martina McBride	3:48
Total length:			41:41

=== "When Love Is Gone" ===
"When Love Is Gone" is a song sung by the character Belle (portrayed by Meredith Braun) as she laments that Scrooge's love of money has replaced his love of her. American country singer Martina McBride reprises the song for the film's end credits. The song was cut from the original 1992 American theatrical edition of the film by Jeffrey Katzenberg, the then-chairman of Walt Disney Studios, who argued that the song would not appeal to young viewers. Instead, the song was played during the film's end credits scene. Brian Henson objected to this decision as the concluding song, "When Love Is Found", was a direct counterpoint to it.

Henson commented: "'When Love Is Gone' was not in the theatrical release, and is presently missing from some copies of the movie, which is a real shame." "When Love Is Gone" is only included on some home media releases of The Muppet Christmas Carol which are now out of print. The song is included on all of the 1993 VHS and LaserDisc releases of the film, as well as at least one UK VHS release.

The 2002 and 2005 DVD releases of the film retain the song in the 90-minute full-screen version of the film, but not in the 86-minute widescreen version on the same disc. A 2012 standalone DVD release of the film uses the same disc from the 2005 release, so it also contains the song. However, a different DVD was used for the 2012 Blu-ray combo pack which does not contain the song. The digital download release of the film contains the entire "When Love Is Gone" as a bonus feature, in widescreen and in high definition.

In a 2018 interview with The Big Issue, Henson said he believed that the song was "unlikely" to appear in any further releases of the film, because Disney had reportedly lost the original video master and film negative. In 2019, Robert Keeling of Den of Geek felt it an "excellent choice" for the song to be omitted, feeling it to be "thoroughly depressing and out of place". However, on December 9, 2020, Henson confirmed to BBC Radio 2 that the original film negative featuring the entire footage of the song had been found by Disney archivists and would be included in all future 4K releases. Due to time constraints, Disney+ was unable to include the new full version on its Christmas 2020 streaming release of the film. At the 2022 D23 Expo in September, Henson stated the version of the film with the song restored would be available on Disney+ later that year. The streaming service released the full-length version as an option in the film's "extras" section on December 9, 2022.

== In popular culture ==
In 2026, retailer Walmart paid homage to The Muppet Christmas Carol in a Christmas advertising campaign, with Walton Goggins in the role of Ebenezer Scrooge encountering Muppets in the roles of the Ghost of Christmas Presents (performed by Alice Dinnean) and her Walmart bag named Bagsy, the Ghost of Deals to Come (performed by Peter Linz), and the Ghost of Christmas Fast. Gonzo, Rizzo the Rat, Miss Piggy and Kermit the Frog all reprise their roles from the film. Pepe the King Prawn, who was not in The Muppet Christmas Carol, has a cameo. Stephanie Beatriz also appears.

== See also ==
- List of Christmas films
- List of ghost films
- List of puppet films
- Adaptations of A Christmas Carol
