= Zak Ford-Williams =

British actor

- Born: Ramsbottom, England
- Education: Manchester School of Theatre
- Occupation: Actor
- Years active: 2021–present

Zak Ford-Williams is an English stage and screen actor, best known for his screen role as Lord Remington in the Netflix series Bridgerton, Harry Hardacre in The Hardacres, and for his stage appearances as Richard III in The Tragedy of Richard III, and Joseph Merrick in The Real and Imagined History of the Elephant Man.

== Early life and education ==
Born in Ramsbottom, he was educated at Woodhey High School and Holy Cross College in Bury, and attended Manchester School of Theatre. He graduated in 2020.

Prior to 2017 he was a member of the Young Company at Summerseat Players' Theatre Royal in Smithy Street, Ramsbottom and then a member of The Young Company at The Royal Exchange Theatre in Manchester.

== Career ==
In 2021, he appeared in the Sky Max television series Wolfe.

In 2022 he played Tiny Tim on stage in Mark Gatiss's adaptation of A Christmas Carol: A Ghost Story at Nottingham Playhouse and the Alexandra Palace Theatre in London.

In 2023 he played Joseph Merrick in the critically acclaimed touring production of The Real and Imagined History of the Elephant Man in 2023. The same year he appeared in BBC One crime drama series Better which broke new ground for disability portrayal as he masked his own disability to play a non-disabled character who later acquires a disability. He also appeared in the BBC Three television comedy short Mobility with Ruben Reuter and Jack Carroll, which went on to win the 2024 BAFTA Television Award for Short Form.

In 2024 he appeared as Lord Remington in series three of the period drama Bridgerton, a role that has been upheld as a best practice example of incidental disability portrayal in the US, as well as appearing as Harry Hardacre in the Paramount+ and Channel 5 historical drama series The Hardacres, which is based on the popular series of books by CL Skelton. Ford-Williams also appeared at The Lyric Theatre, Belfast as Richard III, at the time of the production he was only 25 years old which makes him one of, if not the youngest professional actor to take on the role in a mainstream stage production, and the first ever professional actor with cerebral palsy to play Richard III.

In 2024 he published advice for disabled actors in the Actors and Performer's Year Book

"By prioritising disability inclusion, organisations tap into unique skills, perspectives and talents of disabled people, building a more diverse, innovative and inclusive environment within our industry. Look at the word ‘creative’ in creative arts. We are perfectly placed to create environments in which to do our best work. The energy that the presence of disability creates within a production is a resource of creative potential... I feel amidst the advances being made embedding D/deaf, neurodivergent and disability equality within our industry, a disabled person on a stage or screen is still a political act. The presence of marginalised groups can bring about social and political change: the normalised presence of marginalised groups cements it. The rest is celebration."

Ford-Williams is the voice of the Thimble series of children's audio books by Jon Blake.

== Personal life ==
He has cerebral palsy.

== Filmography ==
| Year | Title | Role | Notes |
|---|---|---|---|
| 2021 | Wolfe | Tyler | 1 episode |
| 2021/22 | A Christmas Carol: A Ghost Story | Tiny Tim, young Marley, Mr Topper and ensemble. | International Cinema Release, BBC Four and BBC iPlayer |
| 2023 | Better | Owen Davies | 5 episodes |
| 2023 | Mobility | Sonny | TV short |
| 2023 | Battery | Elliot | TV Short |
| 2023 | Midsomer Murders | Ludo Trask | 1 episode |
| 2024 | Bridgerton | Lord Remington | 2 episodes |
| 2024–present | The Hardacres | Harry Hardacre | 5 episodes |

== Theatre ==
| Year | Title | Role | Venue | Director |
|---|---|---|---|---|
| 2016 | The Factory | Felix | The Royal Exchange rehearsal studio, Swan Street in Manchester | Matt Hassall |
| 2017 | Nothing | Fredrick | The Royal Exchange Studio Theatre, Manchester | Bryony Shanahan |
| 2017 | We Were Told There Was Dancing | Artyom | Sub basements under The Royal Exchange in Manchester | Matt Hassall |
| 2019 | DYSTOPIA987 | Performer | Site specific, Manchester International Festival | Matthew Dunster |
| 2019 | Attempts on Her Life | Cast | Home Theatre in Manchester | Sebastian Harcombe |
| 2019 | Duchess of Malfi | Grisolan | Home Theatre in Manchester | David Salter |
| 2020 | Coram Boy | Meshak Gardiner | Home Theatre in Manchester | Stefan Escreet |
| 2021/22 | A Christmas Carol: A Ghost Story | Tiny Tim, young Marley and Mr Topper | Nottingham Playhouse and Alexandra Palace Theatre in London | Adam Penford |
| 2023 | The Real & Imagined History of The Elephant Man | Joseph Merrick | Nottingham Playhouse, Blackpool Grand Theatre and Coventry Belgrade Theatre. | Stephen Bailey |
| 2024 | The Tragedy of Richard III | Richard III (Alternate with Michael Patrick) | Lyric Theatre Belfast | Oisín Kearney |
