= Lara Rossi =

British actress

- Born: London
- Occupation: Actress
- Years active: 2011–present
- Known for: Iron Sky: The Coming Race; Crossing Lines

Lara Rossi is a British actress who trained at the London Academy of Music and Dramatic Art. She is most known for her role as Arabela Seeger in the German-French-Italian-American television series Crossing Lines, Finnish sci-fi movie Iron Sky: The Coming Race, and Lady Sybil Ramkin in The Watch, a 2021 fantasy police procedural series for BBC America based on the Discworld novels by Terry Pratchett.

She played Sophie, the (former SRR) nanny of Tali, in the 2025 Paramount+ show NCIS: Tony & Ziva.

== Filmography ==
=== Film ===
- Esio Trot (2015)
- Anchor and Hope (2017)
- Robin Hood (2018)
- Iron Sky: The Coming Race (2019)
- Military Wives (2019)

=== TV ===
- The Shadow Line (2011)
- Murder (2012)
- Crossing Lines (2013-2015)
- Life of Crime (2013)
- Agatha Raisin (2016)
- Cheat (2019)
- Flesh and Blood (2020)
- I May Destroy You (2020)
- Angela Black (2021)
- The Watch (2021)
- The Midwich Cuckoos (2022)
- NCIS: Tony & Ziva (2025)

== Selected theatre ==
- "Woman" in The Writer by Ella Hickson at the Almeida Theatre, London (2018)
- Anne Elliot in Persuasion at the Royal Exchange, Manchester (2017)
- Silvia in First Night at the Donmar Warehouse, London (2012)
- Woman in Tender Napalm at the Southwark Playhouse, London (2012)
