= Don't Forget the Driver =

British television series

- Genre: Comedy drama
- Directed by: Tim Kirkby
- Starring: Toby Jones; Erin Kellyman; Joni Ayton-Kent; Luwam Teklizgi; Danny Kirrane; Dino Kelly; Marcia Warren; Claire Rushbrook; Jo Hartley
- Country of origin: United Kingdom
- Original language: English
- No. of series: 1
- No. of episodes: 6

Production
- Production company: Sister Pictures

Original release
- Network: BBC Two
- Release: 9 April – 14 May 2019

Don't Forget the Driver is a 2019 BBC Two comedy series, co-created and co-written by Tim Crouch and Toby Jones, in which Jones also stars alongside Erin Kellyman. A second series was commissioned by the BBC for broadcast in 2020, but was delayed and later cancelled due to the coronavirus pandemic. The show is produced by Sister Pictures and distributed by BBC Studios.

== Plot ==
Set in Bognor Regis, Jones plays Pete Green, a depressed single father who works as a coach driver and discovers an asylum seeker after taking a coach party across the Channel.

== Cast ==
- Toby Jones as Pete Green
- Erin Kellyman as Kayla Green
- Luwam Teklizgi as Rita
- Danny Kirrane as Squeaky Dave
- Joni Ayton-Kent as Bradley
- Dino Kelly as Lech
- Marcia Warren as Joy
- Claire Rushbrook as Fran
- Jo Hartley as Mel
- Bharti Patel as Manju

== Episodes ==
No.	Title	Directed by	Written by	Original release date	UK viewers (millions) (Note: Viewers across the first 28 days of broadcast on TV, PC/laptop, tablet or smartphone are counted. Pre-transmission figures are included.)
1	"Episode 1"	Tim Kirkby	Tim Crouch	9 April 2019	2.66
2	"Episode 2"	Tim Kirkby	Tim Crouch & Toby Jones	16 April 2019	1.68
3	"Episode 3"	Tim Kirkby	Tim Crouch & Toby Jones	23 April 2019	1.48
4	"Episode 4"	Tim Kirkby	Tim Crouch & Toby Jones	30 April 2019	1.66
5	"Episode 5"	Tim Kirkby	Tim Crouch & Toby Jones	7 May 2019	1.47
6	"Episode 6"	Tim Kirkby	Tim Crouch & Toby Jones	14 May 2019	1.42

== Production ==
For the role, Jones took Coach Driver Certificate of Professional Competence (CPC) lessons and failed his test twice, once for driving too fast and once for going too slowly. In January 2020, Don't Forget the Driver was renewed for a second series of six episodes. However this was cancelled by the BBC due to the COVID-19 pandemic a decision Jones described as “heartbreaking”.

== Broadcast ==
The six-part series began airing in the UK on BBC Two at 10pm on 9 April 2019 and continued weekly. The series performed well in the 10pm slot attracting over 2.2 million viewers. The series was made available in its entirety on iPlayer on 9 April.

== Reception ==
The show won the 2019 Venice TV Award for Best Comedy.
