= Jon Blake (author) =

British writer

- Born: 1954 (age 71–72); Mortimer, Berkshire; England

Jon Blake (born 1954 in Mortimer, Berkshire) is the author of over sixty works for children and teenagers. He was brought up in Southampton and has lived in Cardiff since 1987.

His works include the picture book "You're A Hero, Daley B" (illustrated by Axel Scheffler, worldwide sales of over 200,000), as well as "Little Stupendo", which was shortlisted for the Red House Children's Book Award.

In 1995, Jon's TV play 'Life' was shortlisted for a Writers Guild Award, while in 2002 he won a BBC Talent award for his adult radio sitcom "Degrees R Us", which was broadcast on BBC Radio Wales. In 2017 'Thimble Monkey Superstar', featuring a narrator with cerebral palsy based on Jon's son, was shortlisted for the Lollies (Laugh Out Loud awards). 'Thimble Monkey Superstar', published by Cardiff's Firefly Press, was the eighth of Jon's books to be illustrated by Martin Chatterton. 'Thimble Monkey Superstar' was followed by 'Thimble Holiday Havoc' in 2017 and 'Thimble Wonga Bonkers' 2020. These were all turned into audio books in 2021, read by an actor who also has cerebral palsy, Zak Ford-Williams.

Jon is particularly noted for original and anarchic humour, typified by "Stinky Finger's House of Fun" and the subsequent "House of Fun" series illustrated by David Roberts. However, he has also written radical young adult fiction, such as anti-privatisation thriller "The Last Free Cat". and an adult novel, '69ers', based on the 1969 (Bob Dylan) Isle of Wight Festival.
