= Joni Ayton-Kent =

British actress

- Born: 1995 (age 30–31); London, UK
- Education: Rose Bruford College
- Occupation: Actress

Joni Ayton-Kent is a British actress.

== Early life and education ==
Ayton-Kent studied acting and music at Rose Bruford College, graduating in 2018.

== Career ==
Ayton-Kent made her London debut in 2019 in the ensemble of Sweet Charity at the Donmar Warehouse. She played the non-binary role of Bradley in the British TV series Don’t Forget The Driver (2019). The same year she played the nonbinary character Corporal Cheery Littlebottom in BBC America's Terry Pratchett adaptation, The Watch (as Jo Eaton-Kent).

In 2021 Ayton-Kent played Mrs. Mullin in Carousel at Regent's Park Open Air Theatre. The same year she played the Ghost of Christmas Past in Dickens' A Christmas Carol: A Ghost Story, first at the Nottingham Playhouse, then at London's Alexandra Palace.

In 2022 she appeared in Alice Birch’s play Revolt. She Said. Revolt Again at The Other Room, Cardiff, and as Sam in the play The Prince, by Abigail Thorn, at the Southwark Playhouse. This same year she played four characters in the panto Treasure Island. The following year, Ayton-Kent appeared as Seven in the concert production Super You at the Lyric Theatre in November 2023, and in the project The Cost of Living, a mix of protest, performance and music in Swansea, Wales, created and directed by Dave Evans and Memet Ali Alabora.

In 2024 she was the alternate Bernadette in Priscilla the Party at London's Outernet; the show was an immersive party adaption of the musical Priscilla Queen of the Desert. In February 2025 Ayton-Kent played Elena in the two-day staged concert of If/Then at the Savoy Theatre in London.

=== Stage ===
Year	Title	Role	Theatre
2019	Sweet Charity	Ensemble	Donmar Warehouse
2021	Carousel	Mrs Mullin	Regents Park Open Air Theatre
2021-2022	A Christmas Carol: A Ghost Story	Ghost of Christmas Past	Nottingham Playhouse and Alexandra Palace Theatre
2022	Revolt. She Said. Revolt Again	-	The Other Room, Cardiff
2022	The Prince	Sam	Southwark Playhouse
2022	Treasure Island	Billie Bones, Benji Gunn, Brian the Monkey, Ross Poldark	Hall for Cornwall
2023	Super you in Concert	Seven	Lyric Theatre
2023	The Cost of Living	-	National Theatre of Wales
2024	Priscilla the Party!	alternate Bernadette	Here at Outernet
2025	If/Then (staged concert)	Elena	Savoy Theatre
2025	Hadestown	Fate	Royal Theatre Carré
2026	Bank of Dave: the Musical	Megan/Mary	Leicester Curve

== Filmography ==
Year	Title	Role	Notes
2019	Don't Forget the Driver	Bradley	TV mini series, 6 episodes
2020-2021	The Watch	Corporal Cheery	TV series, 8 episodes
2022	Misnomer	Cai	Short
2022	A Christmas Carol: A Ghost Story	Ghost of Christmas Past	Stage play, cinema release
2023	The Prince	Sam	
2023	T Blockers	Sash VO	
2024	Dead Hot	Marissa	TV series, 1 episode
2024	Divine Intervention	Xena	Short
