= The Watch (TV series) =

2021 BBC fantasy TV series

- Genre: Fantasy; Police procedural
- Created by: Terry Pratchett
- Based on: Ankh-Morpork City Watch
- Developed by: Simon Allen
- Starring: Sam Adewunmi; Matt Berry; Anna Chancellor; Marama Corlett; Richard Dormer; James Fleet; Adam Hugill; Ralph Ineson; Hakeem Kae-Kazim; Joni Ayton-Kent; Ruth Madeley; Bianca Simone Mannie; Ingrid Oliver; Wendell Pierce; Lara Rossi; Paul Kaye; Joe Vaz
- Composer: Russ Davies
- Countries of origin: United Kingdom; United States
- Original language: English
- No. of seasons: 1
- No. of episodes: 8

Production
- Executive producers: Simon Allen; Ben Donald; Richard Stokes; Rob Wilkins; Craig Viveiros; Phil Collinson
- Producer: Johann Knobel
- Running time: ca. 40 minutes per Episode
- Production companies: BBC Studios Drama Productions; Narrativia

Original release
- Network: BBC America
- Release: 3 January – 14 February 2021

The Watch is a fantasy police procedural television programme inspired by the Ankh-Morpork City Watch from the Discworld series of fantasy novels by Terry Pratchett. The series, developed by BBC Studios for BBC America, premiered on 3 January 2021 and was released on BBC iPlayer on 1 July 2021.

== Setting and plot ==
The series is inspired by the Ankh-Morpork City Watch from the Discworld series of fantasy novels by Terry Pratchett. Set in the fictional Discworld's principal city of Ankh-Morpork, The Watch was originally intended to be a "Pratchett-style CSI" as described by Terry Pratchett in 2012; it was to have an episodic storyline, following the format of a "crime of the week" as tackled by the city's police force under the command of Sam Vimes. In 2018 as production got underway, Narrativia described the changing format as a "punk rock thriller".

== Cast ==
- Sam Adewunmi as Carcer Dun
- Matt Berry as voice of Wayne, a sword
- Anna Chancellor as Lord Vetinari
- Marama Corlett as Corporal Angua von Überwald, of the City Watch
- Richard Dormer as Captain Sam Vimes, of the City Watch
- James Fleet as the Archchancellor of Unseen University
- Adam Hugill as Constable Carrot Ironfoundersson, newest member of the City Watch
- Ralph Ineson as the voice of Sergeant Detritus, of the City Watch
- Hakeem Kae-Kazim as Captain John Keel
- Paul Kaye as Inigo Skimmer
- Joni Ayton-Kent as Corporal Cheery Littlebottom, Forensic officer of the City Watch
- Ruth Madeley as Throat
- Bianca Simone Mannie as Wonse
- Ingrid Oliver as Doctor Cruces
- Wendell Pierce as voice of Death
- Lara Rossi as Lady Sybil Ramkin
- Joe Vaz as Urdo van Pew

== Episodes ==
No.	Title	Directed by	Written by	Original release date	Viewers (millions)
1	"A Near Vimes Experience"	Craig Viveiros	Simon Allen	3 January 2021 (US) (Note: "A Near Vimes Experience" was released on 31 December 2020, on AMC+)	0.274
Captain Sam Vimes' life in the City Watch is changed forever when a figure from his past returns to Ankh-Morpork. 20 years ago, Vimes watched his street brother and gang-leader Carcer Dun fall from a fatal height. Somehow, Carcer is back.
2	"Ook"	Craig Viveiros	Simon Allen	3 January 2021 (US)	0.274
Using the policing of Constable Carrot, the Watch connects Carcer's evil plan to strange goings-on at the magical institution called Unseen University. Perhaps a missing library book has something to do with the dragon attacks in the city.
3	"The What?"	Brian Kelly	Simon Allen	10 January 2021 (US)	0.248
As fear of the dragon keeps people off the streets, The Watch must heist The Assassins' Guild, the city's most secretive and dangerous institution, in a desperate effort to find the precious magical artefact known as Gawain before Carcer.
4	"Twilight Canyons"	Brian Kelly	Joy Wilkinson & Simon Allen	17 January 2021 (US)	0.242
Carcer is willing to do anything to find the sword for Gawain; the Watch is close on his tail, following him to Twilight Canyons, a place where the elderly residents await death; DEATH patiently waits for them to draw their last breaths.
5	"Not on My Watch"	Brian Kelly	Catherine Tregenna	24 January 2021 (US)	0.185
The Watch have the sword, and with it they could wield the force of the Noble Dragon. Vimes would much rather no one had power on that scale. The Watch must trek through the Unreal Estate to destroy the sword in a magical lake. Carcer isn't far behind.
6	"The Dark in the Dark"	Emma Sullivan	Simon Allen & Amrou Al-Kadhi	31 January 2021 (US)	0.233
In the race against Carcer for the second mystical artefact, Cheery, Angua, and Carrot venture into the Mines of Tak, Cheery must confront the darkness in her past. Vimes and Sybil defend the besieged Watch House from Doctor Cruces and her Assassins.
7	"Nowhere in the Multiverse"	Emma Sullivan	Simon Allen & Ed Hime	7 February 2021 (US)	0.143
Vimes wakes up with more than the usual hangover. He's slipped into an alternate universe where he's a prisoner in the middle of a jailbreak. In Ankh-Morpork, the alternate-version of Vimes is leading The Watch straight into Carcer's trap.
8	"Better to Light a Candle"	Emma Sullivan	Simon Allen	14 February 2021 (US)	0.130
Carcer's got everything he needs to control the Noble Dragon and destroy Ankh-Morpork. With hysteria on the streets and DEATH preparing for a very busy day, can The Watch, this band of misfits, step up and save the city from annihilation?

== Production ==
=== Development ===
The Watch was announced in 2011 as under development by Prime Focus Productions, which previously created three two-part television adaptations of Discworld novels. It was later reported to be produced by Pratchett's own TV production company, Narrativia, which he founded in 2012 and which was led by Rod Brown, the erstwhile head of Prime Focus. In 2012, the series was variously reported to be written – under Pratchett's oversight – by either Terry Jones and Gavin Scott, or by Guy Burt, and to have a budget of either £13 to £15 million, or £26 million, for its projected run of thirteen 60-minute episodes, with Pratchett's daughter Rhianna as co-writer. In October 2016, after Pratchett's death, Rhianna Pratchett said in an interview that the project was still ongoing, but in 2019, announced she had not been involved in the project "for many years".

In March 2018, Deadline Hollywood reported that BBC Studios was developing The Watch as a six-part series and as the basis of a "returnable franchise". On 30 October 2018, BBC America announced that it had ordered an eight-episode series of The Watch written by Simon Allen together with Joy Wilkinson, Catherine Tregenna, Amrou Al-Khadi and Ed Hime. Hilary Simon and Phil Collinson were the executive producers; the director was Craig Viveiros. Narrativia retained an executive producer credit but was not involved creatively. The series premiered on 3 January 2021.

=== Casting ===
Richard Dormer was cast in the role of Sam Vimes in September 2019. Adam Hugill, Joni Ayton-Kent, Marama Corlett, Lara Rossi, and Sam Adewunmi also joined the cast the same day. The next month, Anna Chancellor and James Fleet joined the cast, as Lord Vetinari and the Archchancellor of Unseen University, respectively, as well as Ingrid Oliver as Doctor Cruces and Ruth Madeley as Throat. In 2019, the series announced it would be recasting several major male characters as women. Joe Vaz was later cast as Urdo van Pew.

=== Filming ===
In September 2014, Pratchett's agent Colin Smythe said that the script was in development and shooting would commence in 2015. After Pratchett's death in 2015, his assistant Rob Wilkins said that pre-production was still ongoing, but that no further announcements would be made until filming had begun. Filming began in Cape Town, South Africa.

== Reception ==
=== Critical response ===
On Rotten Tomatoes, The Watch has a 'rotten' score of 53%, an average rating of 5.9/10, based on 19 reviews. The website's consensus states: "Despite fantastic production design and a solid cast, The Watch simply doesn't capture the wonder, whimsy, and world building of Terry Pratchett's beloved novels." Kiko Martinez of Variety dubbed it a 'tonal mess' and stated, "the show's generic worldbuilding, one-dimensional characterizations and lack of consistent wit will disappoint the kind of niche audience it’s trying to attract." The Hollywood Reporter praised the show's "imaginative world-building" and humour, but said, "the plots are crushingly rote and uninvolving" and found them too familiar. Writing in The Daily Telegraph, Ed Power cautioned that "The Watch takes everything devotees loved about Pratchett: the wryness, the whimsy, the Tolkien-goes-Monty Python setting of Ankh-Morpork. And then chucks it out the window."

=== Deviations from source material ===
Even before the series' release it attracted a large amount of attention for departing from the books' old-fashioned setting, delving into "punk rock" visuals, changing the gender, personality, or origins of characters, and removing some characters completely. These changes angered some Discworld fans, which was exacerbated when Simon Allen, head writer for the series, failed to mention Terry Pratchett during his post commemorating the end of filming. After the 9 October 2020 New York Comic Con panel, Rhianna Pratchett stated it shared "no DNA with my father's Watch", and Neil Gaiman compared the series to "Batman if he's now a news reporter in a yellow trenchcoat with a pet bat".
