= Christopher Godwin =

British actor

- Born: 5 August 1943 (age 82); Loughborough, Leicestershire, England
- Occupation: Actor
- Years active: 1968–present
- Spouse: Christine Margaret Welch (m. 1972)

Christopher Godwin (born 5 August 1943) is a British actor who has been active since the late 1960s.

== TV and recording career ==
He made his TV debut at the age of 25, when he took on the role of PC Grange in an episode of Softly, Softly. He has since made appearances in television dramas including Z-Cars, Nearly a Happy Ending, Return to Waterloo, South of the Border, Return to Treasure Island, Nice Work, The Voyage of the Dawn Treader, My Family and Other Animals, FairyTale: A True Story, The Bill, Murder in Mind, Waking the Dead and The Peter Principle (There's Something About Geoffrey). His film career has included roles in Porridge (1979), Charlie Muffin (1979), Bullshot (1983), A Handful of Dust (1988), FairyTale: A True Story (1997), Jinnah (1998), Scoop (2006), A Viking Saga: The Darkest Day (2013), The Crucible (2014), Mary Poppins Returns (2018), Emma (2020), and The Dig (2021).

In 2012, he guest starred in Season 1, Episode 4 of A Young Doctor's Notebook as Leopold Leopoldovitch. He also voiced Darth Vowrawn in the video game Star Wars: The Old Republic, Chancellor Roderick in the video game Dragon Age: Inquisition, and he played the voice of 3 people in the video game Subnautica (Paul Torgal, Lifepod 7 Crew, and Captain Hollister). In January 2016, he played Lord Berners in Episode 3 of the BBC Radio 4 Afternoon Drama What England Owes. He is also the voice of King Carnelian in Dragon Quest XI.

== Stage appearances ==
Godwin played the role of Holofernes in Love's Labour's Lost in the 2007 season at Shakespeare's Globe. He starred in The Woman in Black at the Fortune Theatre in London and toured with the Stephen Joseph Company in "Better off Dead" by Alan Ayckbourn (October/November 2018). He played the Narrator/Tim in Mark Gatiss's production A Christmas Carol: A Ghost Story (2021).
