= Tiny Tim (A Christmas Carol) =

Fictional character from Dickens' novella "A Christmas Carol"

Tiny Tim Cratchit
- A Christmas Carol character
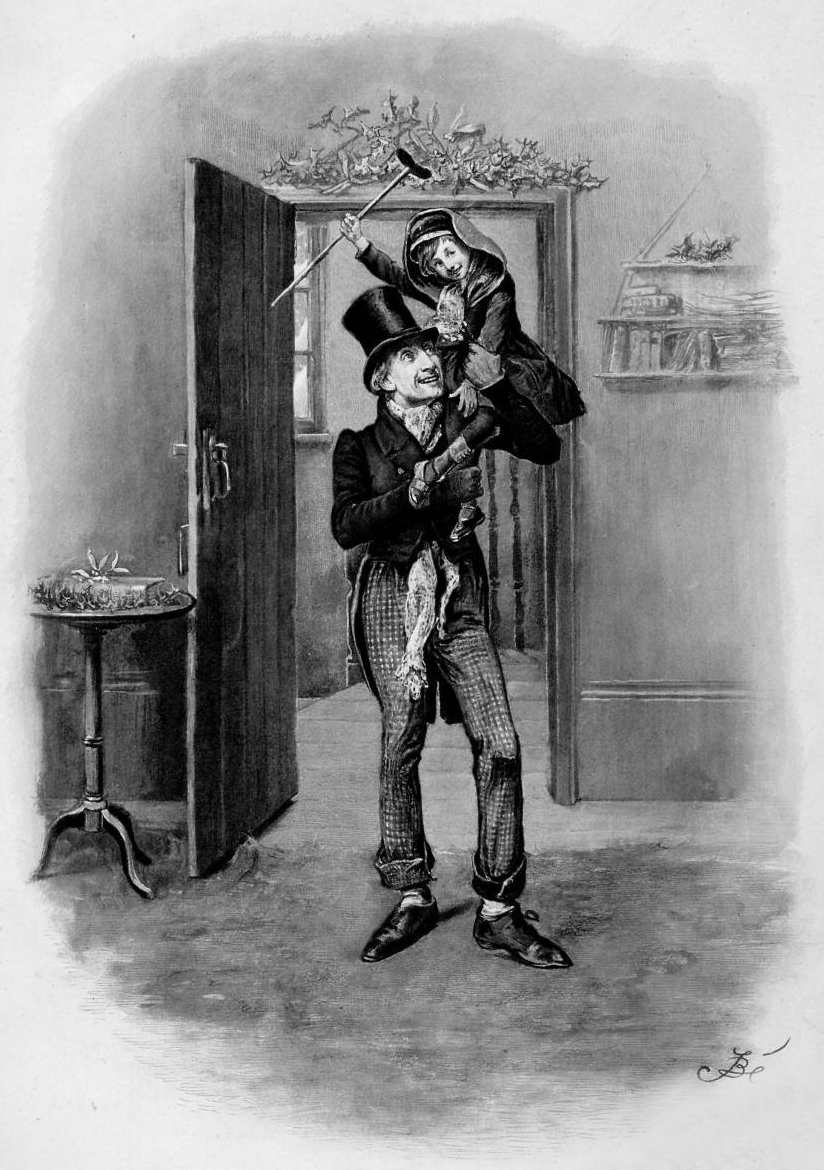
- Bob Cratchit and Tiny Tim Cratchit as depicted in an illustration by Fred Barnard (1870s)
- Created by: Charles Dickens
- Portrayed by: See below

In-universe information
- Nickname: Tiny Tim
- Gender: Male
- Family: Bob (father); Mrs Cratchit (named Emily in some adaptations) (mother); Martha Cratchit; Belinda Cratchit; Peter Cratchit; Unnamed sister Unnamed brother (siblings)

"Tiny" Tim Cratchit is a fictional character from the 1843 novella A Christmas Carol by Charles Dickens. Although seen only briefly, he is a major character, and serves as an important symbol of the consequences of the protagonist's choices.

== Character overview ==
Tiny Tim is the young, ailing son of Bob Cratchit, Ebenezer Scrooge’s underpaid clerk. When Scrooge is visited by the Ghost of Christmas Present he is shown just how ill the boy really is (the family cannot afford to properly treat him on the salary Scrooge pays Cratchit). When visited by the Ghost of Christmas Yet to Come, Scrooge is shown that Tiny Tim will die. This, and several other visions, leads Scrooge to reform his ways. At the end of the story, Dickens makes it explicit that Tiny Tim does not die, and Scrooge becomes a "second father" to him.

Cratchit says of Tim:

"Somehow he gets thoughtful, sitting by himself so much, and thinks the strangest things you ever heard. He told me, coming home, that he hoped the people saw him in the church, because he was a cripple, and it might be pleasant to them to remember upon Christmas Day, who made lame beggars walk, and blind men see."

In the story, Tiny Tim is known for the statement, "God bless us, every one!" which he offers as a blessing at Christmas dinner. Dickens repeats the phrase at the end of the story, symbolic of Scrooge's change of heart.

== Character development ==
In earlier drafts, the character's name was "Little Fred". Dickens may have derived the name from his brothers, who both had "Fred" as a part of their names, one named Alfred and the other Frederick. Dickens also had a sister, Fanny, who had a disabled son named Henry Augustus Burnett (1839–1849) who may have been an inspiration for Tiny Tim. It has also been claimed that the character is based on the son of a friend, who owned a cotton mill in Ardwick, Manchester.

Dickens tried other names such as "Tiny Mick" after "Little Fred" but eventually decided upon "Tiny Tim". After dropping the name "Little Fred", Dickens later used it for Scrooge's nephew "Fred".

== Illness ==
Dickens never explicitly specifies the illness Tiny Tim suffers, although he walks with a crutch and has "his limbs supported by an iron frame".

In 1992, American paediatric neurologist Donald Lewis, although describing the boy as "the crippled son of Ebenezer Scrooge's clerk", proposed as one possibility renal tubular acidosis (type 1), a type of kidney failure causing the blood to become acidic. Rickets (caused by a lack of vitamin D) has been proposed as another possibility, as it was a not uncommon disease during that time period.

A 1997 editorial in The Journal of Infectious Diseases presented a fictional account of construction workers in London discovering Tiny Tim's grave to speculate on the possible causes of his ailment.

== Notable portrayals ==
The role of Tiny Tim has been performed (live action, voiced or animated) by:

- Phillip Frost in the 1935 film Scrooge
- Terry Kilburn in the 1938 film A Christmas Carol
- Glyn Dearman in the 1951 film Scrooge
- Christopher Cook in the 1957 television film A Christmas Carol (Shower of Stars)
- Dennis Holmes on Ronald Reagan's General Electric Theater in the 1957 episode "The Trail to Christmas"
- Joan Gardner (as a properly speaking Gerald McBoing-Boing) in the 1962 animated television film Mister Magoo's Christmas Carol
- Richard Beaumont in the 1970 film Scrooge
- Alexander Williams in the 1971 animated short film A Christmas Carol
- Timothy Chasin in the 1977 television movie A Christmas Carol
- Bobby Rolofson in the 1978 animated television film The Stingiest Man in Town
- Rich Little impersonating Truman Capote as Tim in the 1978 television movie Rich Little's Christmas Carol
- Mel Blanc (as Tweety Pie) in the 1979 animated short film Bugs Bunny's Christmas Carol
- Chris Crabb (as Jonathan Thatcher) in the 1979 television film An American Christmas Carol
- Dick Billingsley (as Morty Fieldmouse) in the 1983 animated film Mickey's Christmas Carol
- Anthony Walters in the 1984 television film A Christmas Carol
- Nicholas Phillips (as Calvin Cooley, in this case a depressed boy of few words) in the 1988 film Scrooged
  - Mary Lou Retton (as herself) played Tiny Tim in the film-within-a-film.
- Jerry Nelson (as Robin the Frog) in Disney's 1992 film The Muppet Christmas Carol
- Don Messick (as Bamm-Bamm Rubble) in the 1994 television special A Flintstones Christmas Carol
- Taran Noah Smith in the 1995 television film Ebbie
- Jarrad Kritzstein in the 1997 animated television film A Christmas Carol
- Joshua Silberg in the 1998 television film Ebenezer
- Ben Tibber in the 1999 television film A Christmas Carol
- Joshua Archambault in the 2000 TV Movie A Diva's Christmas Carol
- Jacob Moriarty in the 2004 TV movie A Christmas Carol: The Musical
- Lisa Vischer (as Edmund Gilbert (Junior Asparagus)) in An Easter Carol
- Tara Strong (as Priscilla Pig, in a similar but not identical role) in the 2006 video Bah, Humduck! A Looney Tunes Christmas
- Ryan Ochoa (Mocap performance by Gary Oldman) in the 2009 film A Christmas Carol
- As a fieldmouse in Nature Cat: a Nature Carol
- Lenny Rush in the 2019 BBC three-part miniseries A Christmas Carol (the first time a disabled actor has played this role in a major adaptation)
- Zak Ford-Williams in Mark Gatiss's adaptation A Christmas Carol: A Ghost Story
- Freddie Lee-Grey in the 2026 film Ebenezer.
