= Jacob Marley =

Ghost in A Christmas Carol (1843)

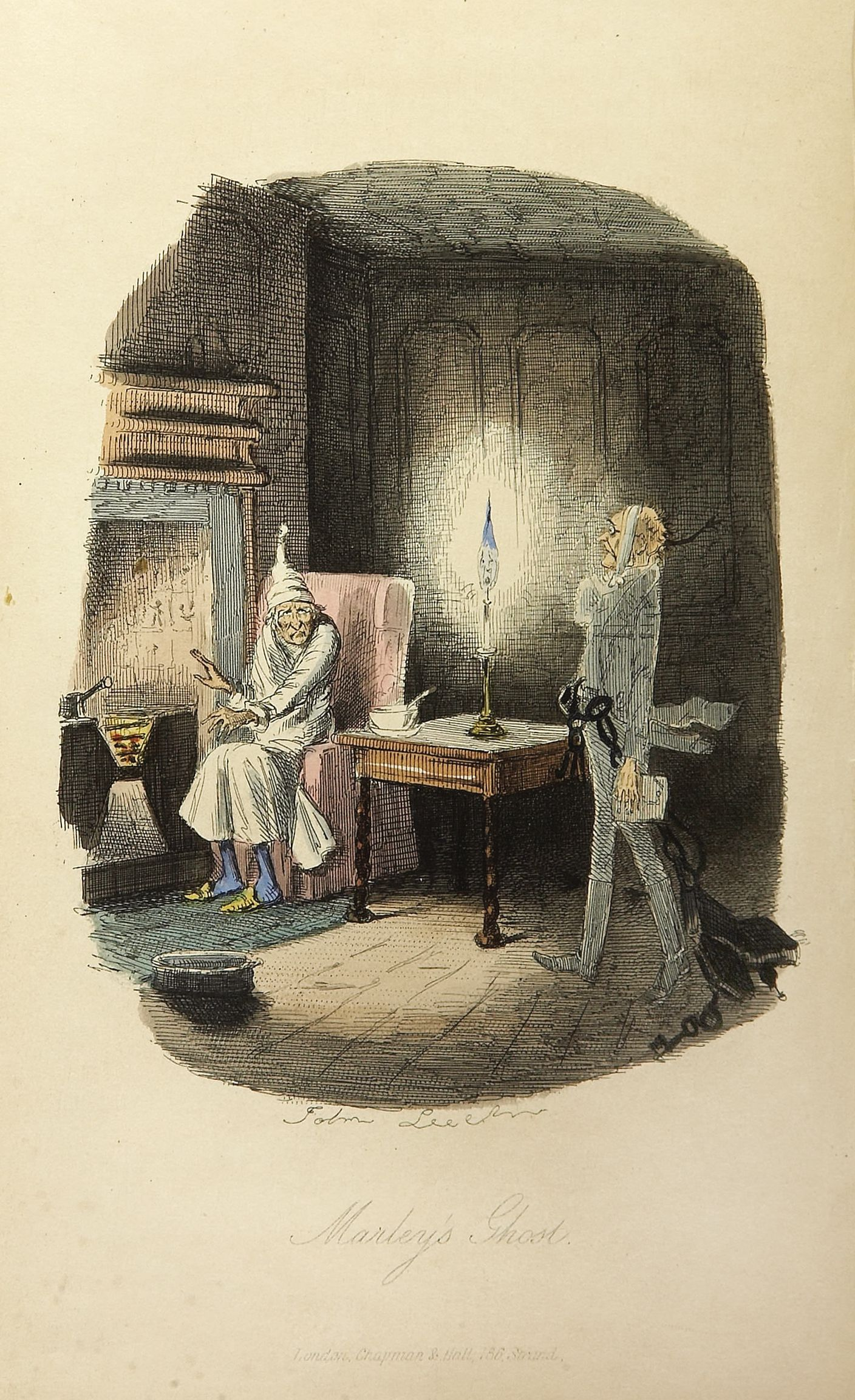
Ebenezer Scrooge encounters the ghost of Jacob Marley in Dickens's novella, A Christmas Carol – illustration by John Leech (1843)

Jacob Marley is a fictional character in Charles Dickens's 1843 novella A Christmas Carol. Marley is the former business partner of Ebenezer Scrooge, the novella's protagonist; he is seven years deceased at the story's opening. On Christmas Eve, Scrooge is visited by Marley's ghost, who wanders the Earth entwined by heavy chains and money boxes due to a lifetime of greed and selfishness. Marley informs Scrooge that he has a single chance of redemption: he will be visited by three spirits in the hope that he will mend his ways. Otherwise, he will be cursed to carry chains of his own.

== Importance to the story ==
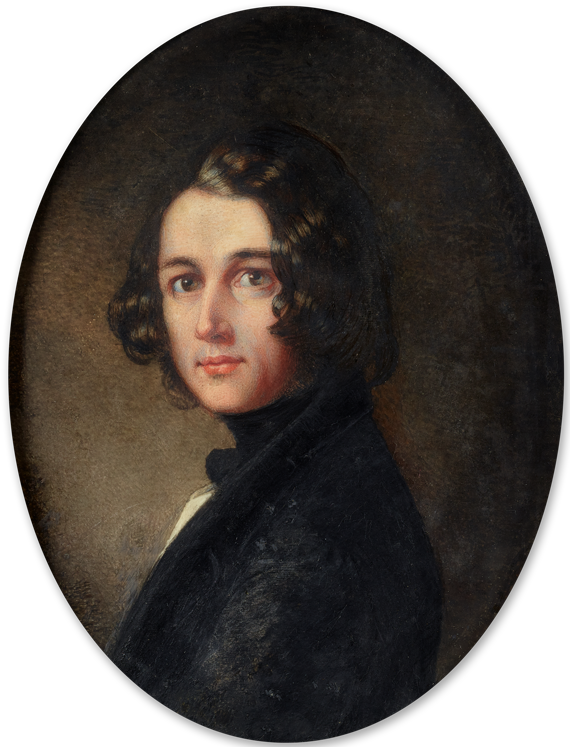
Dickens portrait by Margaret Gillies (1843), painted during the period when he was writing A Christmas Carol.

By early 1843, Dickens had been affected by the treatment of the poor, and in particular the treatment of the children of the poor after witnessing children working in appalling conditions in a tin mine and following a visit to a ragged school. Originally intending to write a political pamphlet titled, An Appeal to the People of England, on behalf of the Poor Man's Child, he changed his mind and instead wrote A Christmas Carol, which voiced his social concerns about poverty and injustice. The ghost of Jacob Marley in Stave One becomes a mouthpiece for part of Dickens's message regarding these.

In the novella, Marley and Scrooge 'were partners for I don't know how many years' and were indistinguishable, both being 'good men of business', grasping of money and unconcerned about the well-being of their 'fellow travellers to the grave'. While it appears that Marley had died without being punished in life for his lack of social responsibility and his indifference to the well-being of his fellow Man, unbeknown to Scrooge after death Marley is forced to roam the earth in Purgatory, fettered in chains, cash boxes and ledger books, desperately wanting to help the poor and needy but unable to do so. On the seventh anniversary of his death on Christmas Eve, the ghost of Jacob Marley, in his torment, appears to Scrooge in his rooms:

Marley in his pig-tail, usual waistcoat, tights, and boots; the tassels on the latter bristling like his pig-tail, and his coat-skirts, and the hair upon his head. The chain he drew was clasped about his middle. It was long and wound about him like a tail; and it was made (for Scrooge observed it closely) of cash-boxes, keys, padlocks, ledgers, deeds, and heavy purses wrought in steel. His body was transparent; so that Scrooge, observing him, and looking through his waistcoat, could see the two buttons on his coat behind.'

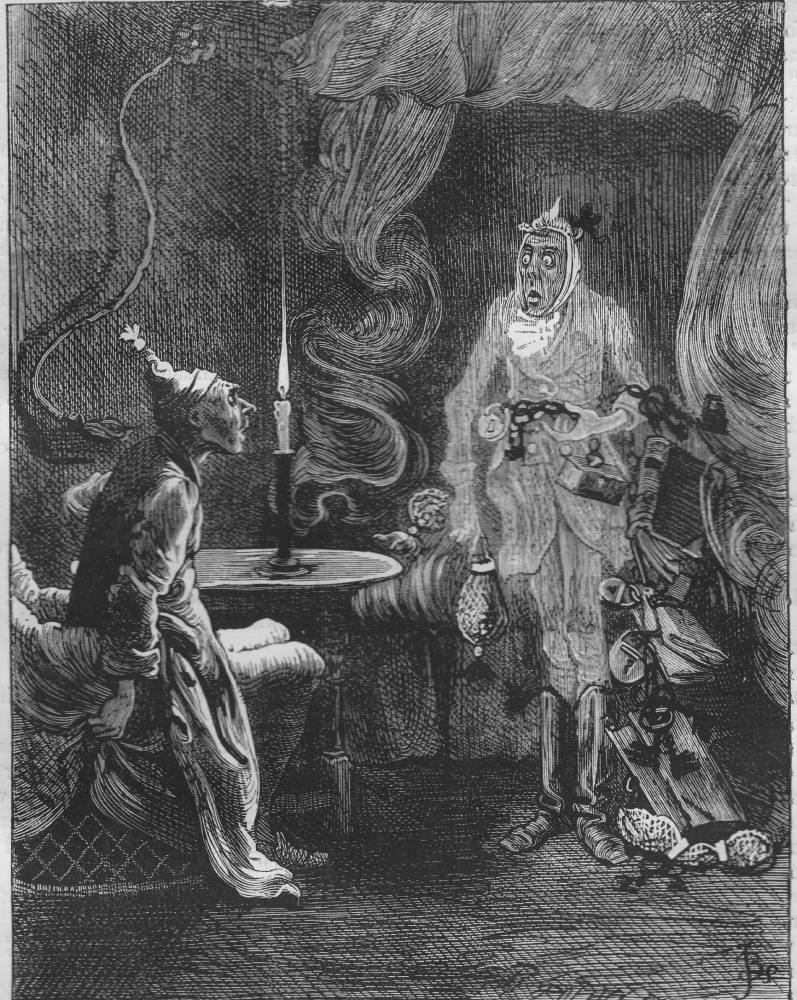
Marley appears to Scrooge – illustration by Fred Barnard (1878).

Marley warns Scrooge that his own chain was as seven times full and heavy as Marley's seven years ago, and that he has been working on it since owing to his indifference to the poor. Scrooge's chain is now ponderous and to avoid an eternity of purgatory, Scrooge must change his life and show penance; to assist him with this, Marley has interceded for Scrooge to be visited by three Spirits who will offer him the chance of escaping the same fate. Marley warns Scrooge to expect the first Spirit when the clock tolls one, the second upon the next night at the same hour, and the third upon the third night when the clock has reached the last stroke of twelve, regardless of Scrooge's suggestion for them to come all at once. Marley tells Scrooge that he will not see him again and leaves the room through the open window where he joins other souls in limbo outside who are tormented by their inability to help the poor and needy in death, as they should have done in life.

Other than the fact that Scrooge and Marley had been business partners in their counting house for many years and that the two men were alike in their greed, Dickens provides little background information about Jacob Marley. His presence in the story is to provide a warning in Stave One concerning the miserliness and misanthropy of Scrooge and to act as a herald for the three Ghosts of Christmas who are to come. Marley's intercession with some higher Power, so that Scrooge will not share Marley's fate, is provided as the explanation for the supernatural visitors who are to follow.

The book makes it clear from the start that Old Marley was as "dead as a door-nail," a phrase first recorded in Langland's Piers Plowman of 1362 where it appears as "ded as a dore-nayl." The reader's understanding of this fact makes Marley's later appearance before Scrooge all the more shocking. Dickens writes, 'Scrooge knew he was dead? Of course, he did. How could it be otherwise? Scrooge and he were partners for I don't know how many years. Scrooge was his sole executor, his sole administrator, his sole assign, his sole residuary legatee, his sole friend, and sole mourner.' The two men were business partners and probably little else. Despite Scrooge's fearful comment that "You were always a good friend to me, Jacob," it is unlikely that the two were actually close, as even on the day of Marley's funeral, Scrooge takes time out to make a good business deal.

== Marley's punishment ==
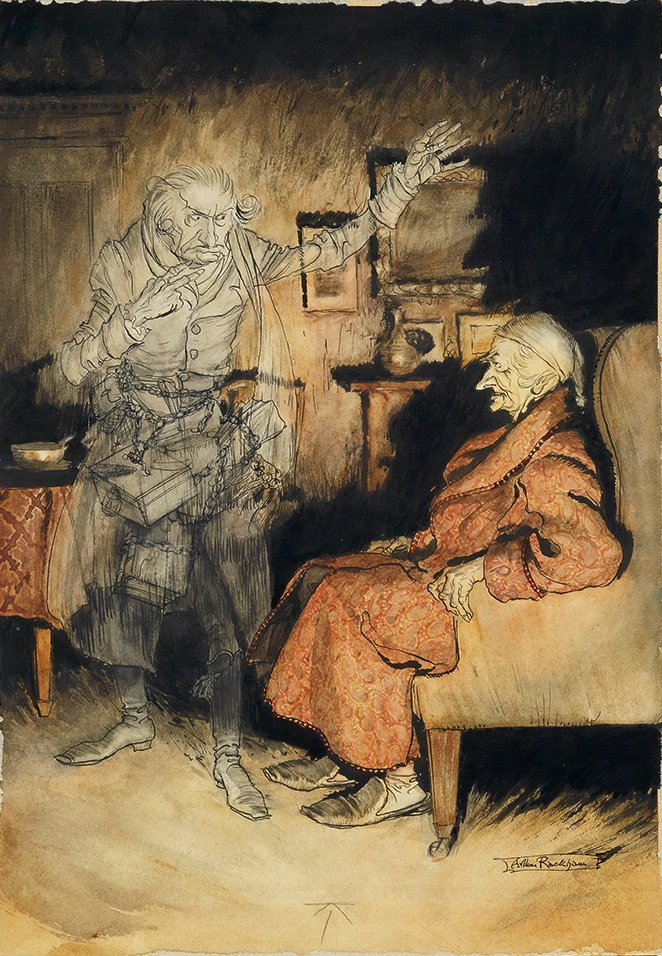
Marley's Ghost - illustration by Arthur Rackham (1915).

Marley's punishment is not to be condemned to Hell, a place of inescapable torment. Instead, his sentence is purgatory. He has been constantly wandering the earth in the seven years since his death. This is evidenced by his remorse and his desire to do good for the poor and needy, those he had ignored in life, but he is in torment himself as he is now unable to help. Marley states to Scrooge:

"It is required of every man," the Ghost returned, "that the spirit within him should walk abroad among his fellowmen, and travel far and wide; and if that spirit goes not forth in life, it is condemned to do so after death. It is doomed to wander through the world—oh, woe is me!—and witness what it cannot share, but might have shared on earth, and turned to happiness!

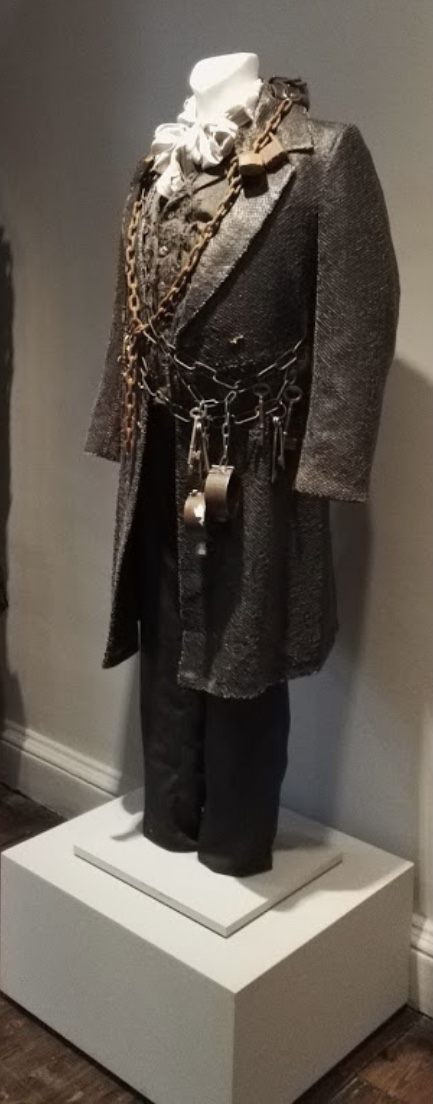
Chained costume for Marley's Ghost from The Man Who Invented Christmas (2017) – displayed at the Charles Dickens Museum, London.

Marley tells Scrooge that his appearance before him is "no light part of [Marley's] penance," and that it offers Scrooge a hope and chance of redemption, "a chance and hope," says Marley, "of my procuring." As Scrooge's own redemption forms part of Marley's penance, he too must also have the hope of eventual redemption, and he could not hope for this if he were in Hell. Dickens's statement that Marley "had no bowels" is a reference to the "bowels of compassion" mentioned in the First Epistle of John, the reason for his torment.

The chain with which Marley is fettered represents his sins in life and his guilt in failing to help his fellow Man. He forged the chain himself over his lifetime and wears it through his lack of compassion for others. Indeed, the ghosts that Scrooge sees outside his window are similarly fettered with objects associated with the sins committed in their lives:

Every one of them wore chains like Marley's Ghost; some few (they might be guilty governments) were linked together; none were free. Many had been personally known to Scrooge in their lives. He had been quite familiar with one old ghost, in a white waistcoat, with a monstrous iron safe attached to its ankle, who cried piteously at being unable to assist a wretched woman with an infant, whom it saw below, upon a door-step. The misery with them all was, clearly, that they sought to interfere, for good, in human matters, and had lost the power for ever.

Clearly, these tormented souls outside the window, like Marley and Scrooge, are guilty of having failed to help those in need while they were alive; now they are dead, it is too late, and the chains with which they too are fettered were also forged by them in life and girded on of their own free will. They are imprisoned by their chains in the same way prisoners would have been fettered in Victorian gaols. None of the spectres wear their chains willingly. While normally chains would be forged from metal, Marley's chains are forged from what he valued in life — money and material wealth. Attached to Marley's chain are ledgers and cash boxes, with each object symbolising money-making – his priority in life – and how he failed to act to help others. Each of the other spectres similarly has attached to them the heavy symbols of their former trades. The old ghost that Scrooge recognises has a monstrous iron safe attached to his chain, perhaps showing that, like Scrooge, he was a miser who hoarded his money instead of helping those in need. He is a kindred spirit to Scrooge, which is perhaps why Scrooge recognizes him. It is apparent that these ghosts, like Marley, are suffering because it is now too late for them to help the living and they now have no chance of redemption – to put things right. The chain with which Scrooge is unknowingly girded would be stronger and heavier and more ponderous than that about Marley as Scrooge has been working on it for seven years more through each act of indifference to those about him.

== Possible origins ==
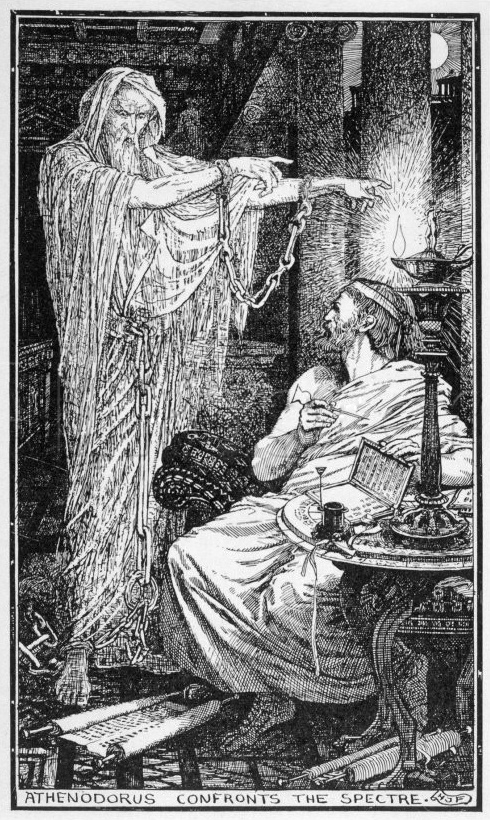
Athenodorus encounters the chained ghost.

One theory for Marley's origin put forward by the film-writer and author Roger Clarke and the historian Daisy Dunn is that Dickens was influenced by the writings of Pliny the Younger, who related a celebrated account of a haunted house from the ancient classical world (c. 50 AD). In 1825 the young Dickens was sent to Wellington House Classical and Commercial Academy where in 1827 he won the Latin prize. It may have been as part of his studies that he first encountered Pliny's ghostly tale. However, Dunn states that in his library Dickens had a copy of The Philosophy of Mystery by Walter Cooper Dendy, published in 1841, two years before Dickens wrote A Christmas Carol. The book also relates Pliny's description of the haunting of the house in Athens, which was bought by the Stoic philosopher Athenodorus, who lived about 100 years before Pliny. Knowing that the house was supposedly haunted, Athenodorus intentionally set up his writing desk in the room where the apparition was said to appear and sat there writing until late at night when he was disturbed by a ghost which came at first to the door and then into the chamber, and who, like Marley, was bound in chains. Pliny wrote to his friend Sura that "In the dead of the night a noise, resembling the clashing of iron, was frequently heard, which, if you listened more attentively, sounded like the rattling of fetters; at first it seemed at a distance, but approached nearer by degrees; immediately afterward a phantom appeared in the form of an old man, extremely meagre and squalid, with a long beard and bristling hair; rattling the gyves on his feet and hands." Athenodorus followed the ghost outside where it indicated a spot on the ground. When Athenodorus later excavated the area, a shackled skeleton was unearthed. The haunting ceased when the skeleton was given a proper reburial.

For the chained Marley, Dickens possibly also drew on his memory of a visit to the Western Penitentiary in Pittsburgh, Pennsylvania, in March 1842, where he saw—and was affected by seeing—fettered prisoners and wondered whether they were "nightly visited by spectres".

When Dickens was young, he lived in lodgings at 10 Norfolk Street (present day 22 Cleveland Street), in London's Fitzrovia district, just yards away from a local cheesemonger called Marley and near also to a tradesman's premises with the sign "Goodge and Marney", either of which may have provided the name for Scrooge and his former business partner though Dr Marley is much more likely.

== In popular culture ==
Marley is the subject of the novel Jacob Marley's Ghost by Michael Fridgen (2019), Marley by Jon Clinch (2019) and Jacob T. Marley by R. William Bennett (2011). The song "Jacob Marley's Chain" appears on Aimee Mann's first solo album, Whatever (1993).

The American bluegrass band Marley's Ghost is named for the character. It has existed since the mid-1980s and has recorded 12 albums.

== Notable portrayals ==
Frank Finlay as Jacob Marley in A Christmas Carol (1984).

- Harry Carter in The Right to Be Happy (1916)
- Leo G. Carroll in A Christmas Carol (1938)
- Michael Hordern in Scrooge (1951)
- Basil Rathbone in A Christmas Carol (1954)
- Royal Dano (voice) in Mister Magoo's Christmas Carol (1962)
- Alec Guinness in Scrooge (1970)
- Michael Hordern (voice) in the Oscar-winning A Christmas Carol (1971)
- John Le Mesurier in A Christmas Carol (1977)
- Theodore Bikel (voice) in The Stingiest Man in Town (1978)
- Mel Blanc (voice) (as Bugs Bunny) in Bugs Bunny's Christmas Carol (1979)
- Hal Smith (voice) (as Goofy) in Mickey's Christmas Carol (1983)
- Frank Finlay in A Christmas Carol (1984)
- Statler and Waldorf (performed by Jerry Nelson and Dave Goelz) as brothers Jacob and Robert Marley in The Muppet Christmas Carol (1992)
- John Stephenson (voice) (as Mr. Slate in the role) in A Flintstones Christmas Carol (1994)
- Ed Asner (voice) in A Christmas Carol (1997)
- Bernard Lloyd in A Christmas Carol (1999)
- Ray Fearon in A Christmas Carol (2000). This version of Marley also stands in for the Ghost of Christmas Present, and Scrooge is partially responsible for his death.
- Rozonda "Chilli" Thomas as Marli Jacob in A Diva's Christmas Carol (2000)
- Nicolas Cage (voice) in Christmas Carol: The Movie (2001) - In this version, Jacob appears a second time to bring Scrooge back to the present.
- Jason Alexander in A Christmas Carol: The Musical (2004)
- Keith Wickham (voice) in A Christmas Carol (2006) - In this version, Scrooge's redemption frees Marley from his chains.
- Joe Alaskey (voice) (as Sylvester the Cat) in Bah, Humduck! A Looney Tunes Christmas (2006)
- Gary Oldman (voice) in A Christmas Carol (2009)
- Tim Kazurinsky in Scrooge & Marley (2012) - In this version, the chains on Jacob Marley loosen from him at the end of the film due to a loophole he exploited.
- Peter Firth in Dickensian (2015)
- Donald Sumpter in The Man Who Invented Christmas (2017)
- Alex Gaumond in the play A Christmas Carol (2017)
- Elly (unvoiced character) in the Pocoyo episode "Pocoyo's Christmas Carol" (2017)
- Stephen Graham in the BBC miniseries A Christmas Carol (2019) - In this version, he and Scrooge were asset-strippers. After visiting him as a ghost, he interacts with each of the ghosts that visit Scrooge. After a second talk with Scrooge and wanting the ghosts to spare Tiny Tim's life, Jacob returns to his grave to rest in peace.
- Andy Serkis (voice) A Christmas Carol (2020)
- Mark Gatiss in A Christmas Carol: A Ghost Story (2021)
- Patrick Page in Spirited (2022)
- Jonathan Pryce (voice) in Scrooge: A Christmas Carol (2022)
- Adrian Lester as Jacob Marley and Ben Schwartz as his hypothetical son Bob Marley in Staged (2023).
- Ian McKellen in Ebenezer (2026) with Johnny Depp as Ebenezer Scrooge.

== See also ==
- Ghost of Christmas Past
- Ghost of Christmas Present
- Ghost of Christmas Yet to Come

== Citations ==
- Callow, Simon (2009). Dickens' Christmas: A Victorian Celebration. London: Frances Lincoln. ISBN 978-0-7112-3031-6.
- Childs, Peter; Tredell, Nicolas (2006). Charles Dickens. Basingstoke, Hampshire: Palgrave Macmillan. ISBN 978-1-4039-1919-9.
- DeVito, Carlo (2014). Inventing Scrooge (Kindle ed.). Kennebunkport, ME: Cider Mill Press. ISBN 978-1-60433-555-2.
- Douglas-Fairhurst, Robert (2006). "Introduction". In Dickens, Charles (ed.). A Christmas Carol and other Christmas Books. Oxford: Oxford University Press. pp. vii–xxix. ISBN 978-0-19-920474-8.
- Kelly, Richard Michael (2003). "Introduction". In Dickens, Charles (ed.). A Christmas Carol. Ontario: Broadway Press. pp. 9–30. ISBN 978-1-55111-476-7.
- Ledger, Sally (2007). Dickens and the Popular Radical Imagination. Cambridge: Cambridge University Press. ISBN 978-0-521-84577-9.
- Lee, Imogen. "Ragged Schools". British Library. Archived from the original on 15 July 2014.
- Slater, Michael (2011). "Dickens, Charles John Huffam". Oxford Dictionary of National Biography (online ed.). Oxford University Press. doi:10.1093/ref:odnb/7599.
