= Ghost of Christmas Past =

Fictional character by Charles Dickens

- A Christmas Carol character
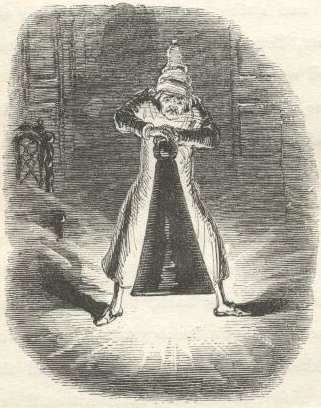
- Ebenezer Scrooge extinguishes the Ghost of Christmas Past - illustration by John Leech (1843).
- Created by: Charles Dickens
- Alias: Spirit of Christmas Past
- Species: Ghost
- Gender: None (Note: It has been portrayed both as male and as female)
- Occupation: Spirit of memories
- Relatives: Ghost of Christmas Present (follower); Ghost of Christmas Yet-to-Come (follower)

The Ghost of Christmas Past is a fictional character in Charles Dickens' 1843 novella A Christmas Carol. The Ghost is one of three spirits that appear to miser Ebenezer Scrooge to offer him a chance of redemption.

Following a visit from the ghost of his deceased business partner, Jacob Marley, Scrooge receives nocturnal visits from three Ghosts of Christmas, each representing a different period in Scrooge's life. The Ghost of Christmas Past is concerned with the Christmases from Scrooge's past.

Appearing to be both young and old, the spirit carries a large cap in the shape of a candle extinguisher under its arm. From the top of its head shines a bright light that illuminates Scrooge's memories.

== Background ==
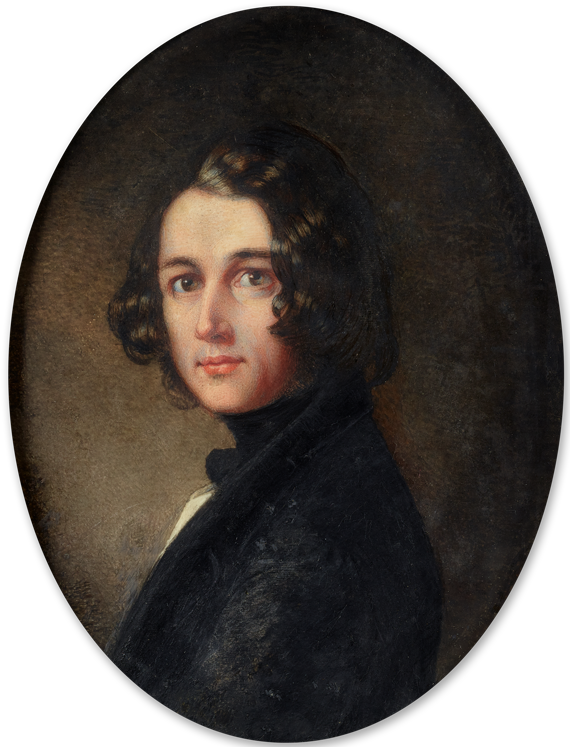
Dickens portrait by Margaret Gillies (1843), painted during the period when he was writing A Christmas Carol.

By early 1843, Dickens had been affected by the treatment of the poor and, in particular, the treatment of the children of the poor after witnessing children working in appalling conditions in a tin mine and following a visit to a ragged school. Indeed, Dickens experienced poverty as a boy when he was forced to work in a blacking factory after his father's imprisonment for debt. Originally intending to write a political pamphlet titled, An Appeal to the People of England, on behalf of the Poor Man's Child, he changed his mind and instead wrote A Christmas Carol which voiced his social concerns about poverty and injustice. Dickens's friend John Forster said that Dickens had "a hankering after ghosts" while not having a belief in them himself. His journals Household Words and All the Year Round regularly featured ghost stories, with the novelist publishing an annual ghost story for several years after his first, A Christmas Carol, in 1843. In this novella, Dickens was innovative in making the existence of the supernatural a natural extension of the real world in which Scrooge and his contemporaries lived.

== Significance to the story ==
The Ghost of Christmas Past is a strange, otherworldly creature that shimmers and flickers like a candlelight, constantly changing in appearance as it reflects Scrooge's memories, old and new. As one memory comes sharply into focus, another fades. As the Spirit represents Scrooge's youth so it can appear youthful, its skin is of the "tenderest bloom"; but as Scrooge is now old, the Spirit will also appear old to reflect this. The Ghost's clothing continues in the same contradictory vein as it holds a branch of holly, which symbolises Winter while its robe is trimmed with summer flowers. In addition, the constantly changing aspect of the Spirit may be attributed to representing the various other people seen in the visions revealed to Scrooge:

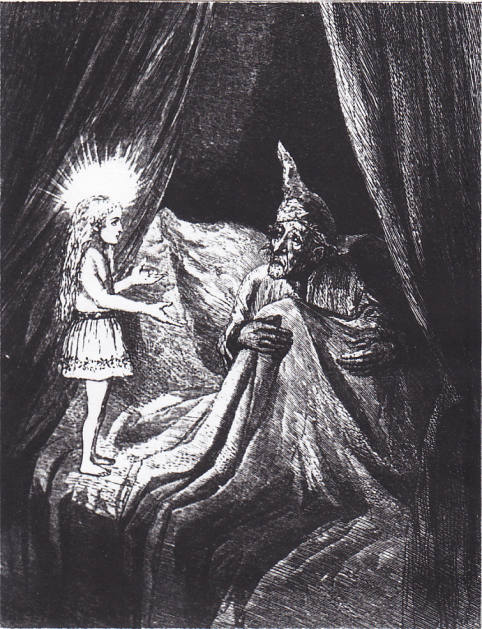
The Spirit of Christmas Past meets Scrooge - illustration by Sol Eytinge Jr. (1868).

It was a strange figure—like a child: yet not so like a child as like an old man, viewed through some supernatural medium, which gave him the appearance of having receded from the view, and being diminished to a child's proportions. Its hair, which hung about its neck and down its back, was white as if with age; and yet the face had not a wrinkle in it, and the tenderest bloom was on the skin. The arms were very long and muscular; the hands the same, as if its hold were of uncommon strength. Its legs and feet, most delicately formed, were, like those upper members, bare... But the strangest thing about it was, that from the crown of its head there sprung a bright clear jet of light, by which all this was visible; and which was doubtless the occasion of its using, in its duller moments, a great extinguisher for a cap, which it now held under its arm.

Even this, though, when Scrooge looked at it with increasing steadiness, was not its strangest quality. For as its belt sparkled and glittered now in one part and now in another, and what was light one instant, at another time was dark, so the figure itself fluctuated in its distinctness: being now a thing with one arm, now with one leg, now with twenty legs, now a pair of legs without a head, now a head without a body: of which dissolving parts, no outline would be visible in the dense gloom wherein they melted away. And in the very wonder of this, it would be itself again; distinct and clear as ever.

When Scrooge demands to know its business, the Spirit replies, "Your welfare!" When Scrooge demurs that he would rather benefit from a good night's sleep, the Spirit responds, "Your reclamation, then. Take heed!"

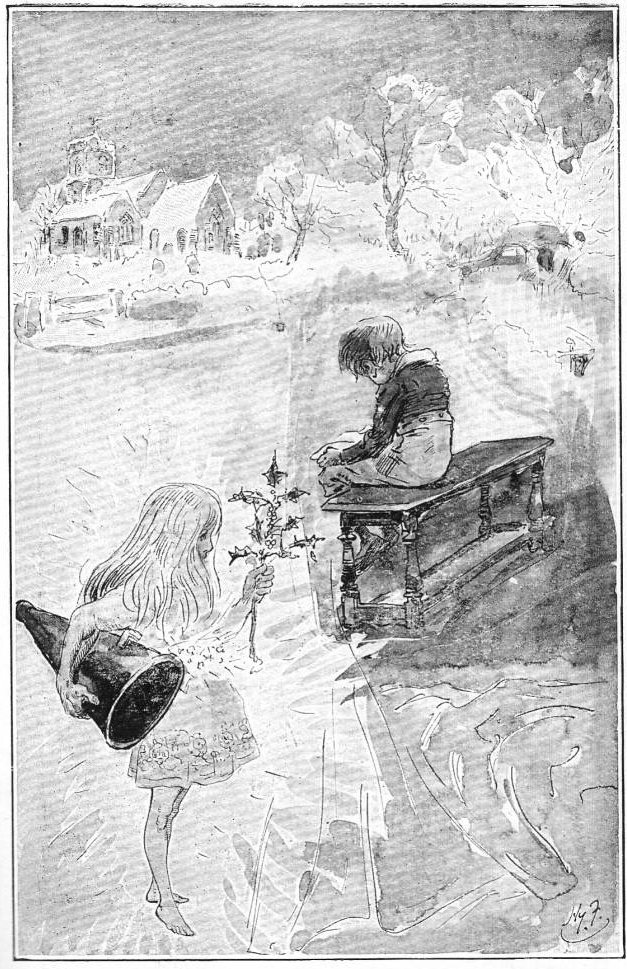
The First of the Three Spirits - illustration by Harry Furniss (1910).

=== Visions of the Past ===
Although seemingly gentle and ethereal, the Spirit is deceptively strong, putting out its strong hand as it spoke and gently clasped him by the arm. "Rise! and walk with me!" Scrooge worries that he is liable to fall but the Spirit invites him to fly. Scrooge shows the first flicker of emotion when shown the vision of his unhappy childhood that the Spirit reveals to him, particularly when he sees his schoolfriends, and he again sees his younger sister, Fan. Scrooge becomes even more animated at the Christmas Eve celebrations during the time of his apprenticeship to Mr. Fezziwig. Scrooge shows a further awakening of his human nature when the Spirit asks:

"A small matter," said the Ghost, "to make these silly folks so full of gratitude."

The Spirit signed to him to listen to the two apprentices, who were pouring out their hearts in praise of Fezziwig: and when he had done so, said,

"Why! Is it not? He has spent but a few pounds of your mortal money: three or four perhaps. Is that so much that he deserves this praise?"

"It isn't that," said Scrooge, heated by the remark, and speaking unconsciously like his former, not his latter, self. "It isn't that, Spirit. He has the power to render us happy or unhappy; to make our service light or burdensome; a pleasure or a toil. Say that his power lies in words and looks; in things so slight and insignificant that it is impossible to add and count 'em up: what then? The happiness he gives, is quite as great as if it cost a fortune."

He felt the Spirit's glance, and stopped.

Scrooge has been allowed to consider the benefits of being a good and generous employer, as Fezziwig was, and comes to regret mistreating his clerk, Bob Cratchit.

The Spirit then shows Scrooge his subsequent painful parting from his fiancée Belle and a now-married Belle with her large, happy family on the Christmas Eve that Marley died. When Scrooge becomes upset by these memories, the Spirit says, "These are the shadows of the things that have been. That they are what they are, do not blame me." When Scrooge asks the ghost to remove him from the house, he "turned upon the Ghost, and seeing that it looked upon him with a face, in which in some strange way there were fragments of all the faces it had shown him". Scrooge wrestles with the ghost, crying out, "Leave me! Take me back. Haunt me no longer!" and seizes the Spirit's cap. "In the struggle, if that can be called a struggle in which the Ghost with no visible resistance on its own part was undisturbed by any effort of its adversary, Scrooge observed that its light was burning high and bright; and dimly connecting that with its influence over him, he seized the extinguisher-cap, and by a sudden action pressed it down upon its head."

== Notable portrayals ==
Dickens refers to the Spirit as "it", implying the Ghost is neither male nor female, which has posed problems for dramatists from the novella's first stage productions up to television and film productions, having been portrayed by male and female actors, old and young.

=== Film ===
- Marie Ney - Scrooge (1935)
- Ann Rutherford - A Christmas Carol (1938)
- Michael J. Dolan - Scrooge (1951)
- Edith Evans - Scrooge (1970)
- Diana Quick (voice) - A Christmas Carol (1971)
- David Johansen - Scrooged (1988)
- Jessica Fox (voice) - The Muppet Christmas Carol (1992)
- Kath Soucie (voice) - A Christmas Carol (1997)
- Kathy Griffin - A Diva's Christmas Carol (2000)
- Jane Horrocks - Christmas Carol: The Movie (2001)
- June Foray (Granny) and Bob Bergen (Tweety) - Bah, Humduck! A Looney Tunes Christmas (2006)
- Jim Carrey (voice) - A Christmas Carol (2009)
- Sunita Mani - Spirited (2022)
- Olivia Colman (voice) - Scrooge: A Christmas Carol (2022)
- Eva Longoria - Christmas Karma (2025)
- Andrea Riseborough - Ebenezer (2026)

=== Television ===
- Joan Gardner (voice) - Mister Magoo's Christmas Carol (1962)
- Patricia Quinn - A Christmas Carol (1977)
- Paul Frees (voice) - The Stingiest Man in Town (1978)
- Eddie Carroll (Jiminy Cricket) - Mickey's Christmas Carol (1983)
- Angela Pleasence - A Christmas Carol (1984)
- Mike Judge (Tom Anderson) - "A Very Special Christmas With Beavis and Butt-Head" (1993)
- Jean Vander Pyl (Wilma Flintstone) - A Flintstones Christmas Carol (1994)
- Joel Grey - A Christmas Carol (1999)
- Matt Smith - Doctor Who episode "A Christmas Carol" (2010)
- Andy Serkis - A Christmas Carol (2019)
- Faith Wright - Christmas Above the Clouds (she appears as a flight attendant)

=== Plays ===
- Patrick Stewart - A Christmas Carol (1988)
- Jaime Lyn Beatty - A VHS Christmas Carol (2020)

== See also ==
- Jacob Marley
- Ghost of Christmas Present
- Ghost of Christmas Yet to Come

== Sources ==
- Callow, Simon (2009). Dickens' Christmas: A Victorian Celebration. London: Frances Lincoln. ISBN 978-0-7112-3031-6.
- Childs, Peter; Tredell, Nicolas (2006). Charles Dickens. Basingstoke, Hampshire: Palgrave Macmillan. ISBN 978-1-4039-1919-9.
- Ledger, Sally (2007). Dickens and the Popular Radical Imagination. Cambridge: Cambridge University Press. ISBN 978-0-521-84577-9.
- Lee, Imogen. "Ragged Schools". British Library. Archived from the original on 15 July 2014.
