= Ghost of Christmas Yet to Come =

Fictional character in A Christmas Carol by Dickens

- A Christmas Carol character
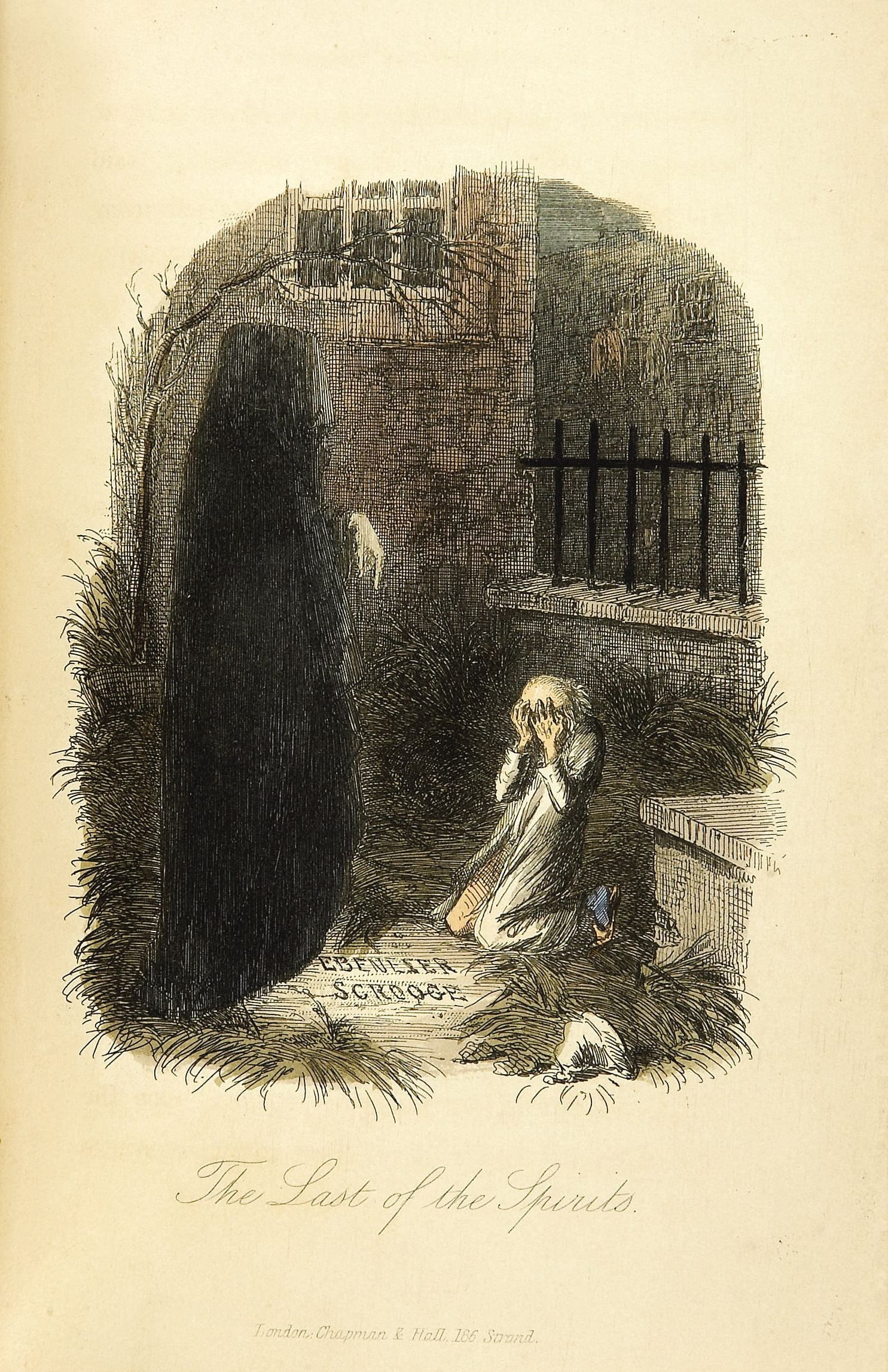
- The Ghost of Christmas Yet to Come and Ebenezer Scrooge - original illustration by John Leech (1843).
- First appearance: A Christmas Carol; 1843
- Created by: Charles Dickens
- Alias: Spirit of Christmas Yet to Come
- Species: Ghost
- Gender: Male (Note: When not referred to as "it", the ghost is usually referred to as "he".)
- Occupation: Haunting phantom
- Relatives: Ghost of Christmas Past (forerunner); Ghost of Christmas Present (forerunner)

The Ghost of Christmas Yet to Come is a fictional character in Charles Dickens's 1843 novella A Christmas Carol. The Ghost is the last of the three spirits that appear to miser Ebenezer Scrooge to offer him a chance of redemption, foretold by the ghost of his deceased business partner, Jacob Marley.

Following the visit from Marley, Scrooge receives nocturnal visits from three Ghosts of Christmas, each representing a different period in Scrooge's life. The shrouded, ominous, and silent Ghost of Christmas Yet to Come is Scrooge's last visitor and shows him a vision of a Christmas Day soon after his death.

== Background ==
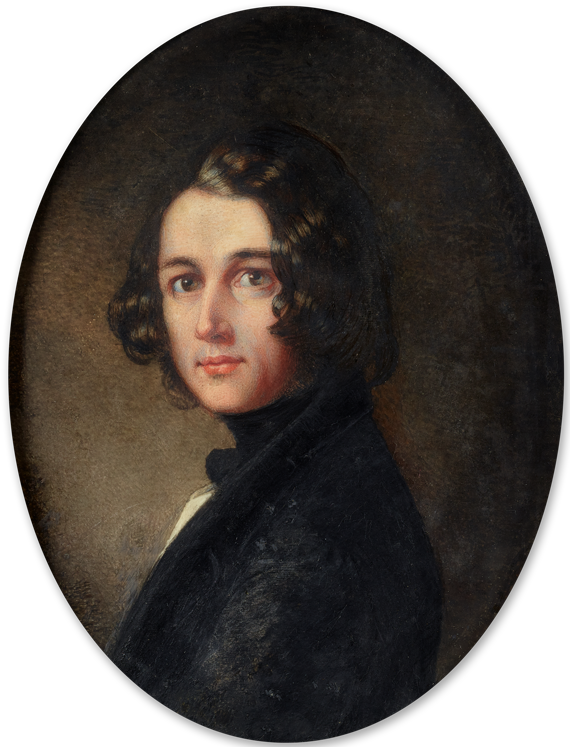
Dickens portrait by Margaret Gillies (1843), painted during the period when he was writing A Christmas Carol.

By early 1843, Dickens had been affected by the treatment of the poor, and in particular the treatment of the children of the poor after witnessing children working in appalling conditions in a tin mine and following a visit to a ragged school. Indeed, Dickens experienced poverty as a boy when he was forced to work in a blacking factory after his father's imprisonment for debt. Originally intending to write a political pamphlet titled, An Appeal to the People of England, on behalf of the Poor Man's Child, he changed his mind and instead wrote A Christmas Carol which voiced his social concerns about poverty and injustice.

Dickens's friend and biographer John Forster said that Dickens had "a hankering after ghosts" while not having a belief in them himself. His journals Household Words and All the Year Round regularly featured ghost stories, with the novelist publishing an annual ghost story for some years after his first, A Christmas Carol, in 1843. In this novella, Dickens was innovative in making the existence of the supernatural a natural extension of the real world in which Scrooge and his contemporaries lived. Dickens making the Christmas Spirits a central feature of his story is a reflection of the early-Victorian interest in the paranormal.

Unlike the previous two Christmas Spirits, the Ghost of Christmas Yet to Come follows the tradition of Gothic literature, which Dickens had read as a teenager. Apart from A Christmas Carol, Dickens also incorporated the gloomy atmosphere and melodrama of Gothic literature into various of his other works, shifting them to a more modern period and an urban setting, for example in Oliver Twist (1837–1838), Bleak House (1854), Great Expectations (1860–1861) and the unfinished Edwin Drood (1870). As in A Christmas Carol, these novels juxtapose wealthy, ordered, and affluent civilisation with the disorder and barbarity of the poor in the same metropolis.

== Significance to the story ==
Unlike the two previous Spirits who come at the stroke of one, the Ghost of Christmas Yet to Come makes its appearance on the last stroke of twelve, the Witching Hour. It is introduced as an ominous and silent figure: "...a solemn Phantom, draped and hooded, coming, like a mist along the ground, towards him... Scrooge feared the silent shape so much that his legs trembled beneath him, and he found that he could hardly stand when he prepared to follow it."

When it came near him, Scrooge bent down upon his knee; for in the very air through which this Spirit moved, it seemed to scatter gloom and mystery. It was shrouded in a deep black garment, which concealed its head, its face, its form, and left nothing of it visible, save one outstretched hand. But for this, it would have been difficult to detach its figure from the night and separate it from the darkness by which it was surrounded.

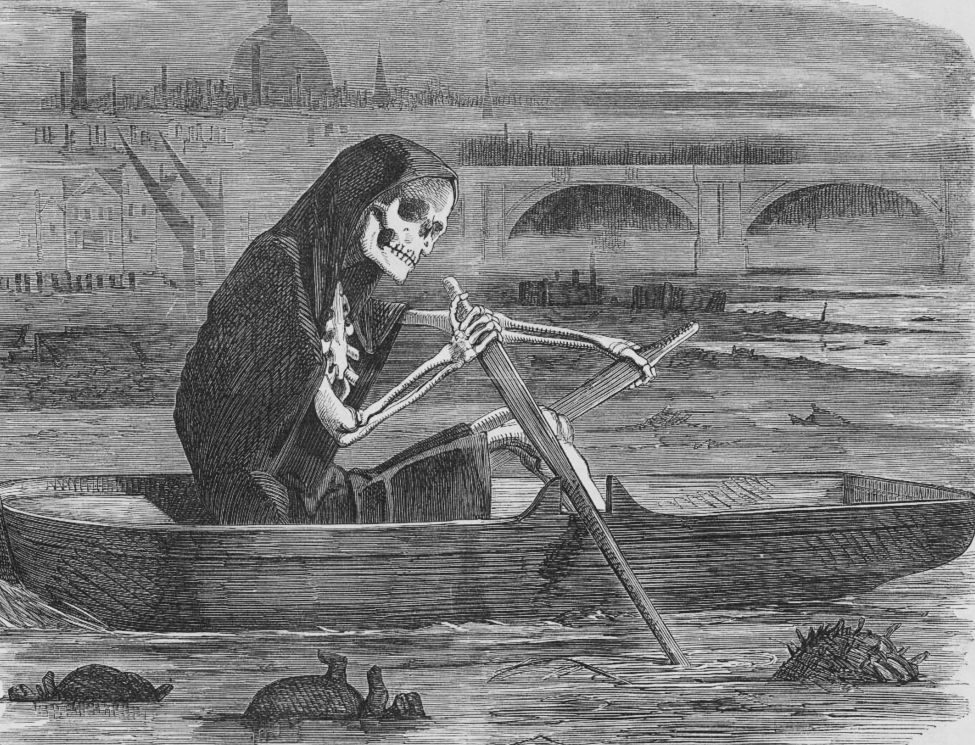
Representation of Death wearing a shroud – "The Silent Highwayman" – John Leech, Punch (1858).

The Spirit in its "dusky shroud" is a personification of Death. While this may seem an odd choice to modern readers for a Christmas ghost, in the early Victorian era, people would remember their deceased loved ones at Christmastime, which was also a time for reflection at the end of the year. In his article "What Christmas Is, As We Grow Older", published in Household Words in 1851, Dickens wrote, "Of all days in the year, we will turn our faces to that City [of the Dead] upon Christmas Day, and from its silent hosts bring those we loved, among us." Dickens described a similar Christmas spectre in his story "A December Vision" (1850), which also has a slow and unwavering persistence and which also has a shaded face and ghostly eyes.

Like the future, the Ghost of Christmas Yet to Come is unknown, mysterious, and silent, and Scrooge fears his message most of all. The Spirit points when it wishes Scrooge to look at something or follow. The Victorians believed ghosts had the power to see the future, including people's deaths, and in the novella, the Ghost of Christmas Yet to Come reveals to Scrooge his death. The Spirit shows Scrooge that his future fate is not set in stone or written on his gravestone but can be changed – by changing his actions in the present. The ghost is described as being moved by Scrooge's case. When it first arrives, Scrooge is fearful of the ghost that the "spirit paused a moment, as observing his condition, and giving him time to recover." When Scrooge vows to change his ways upon seeing his unloved grave, the ghost's kind hand trembles.

During the 1840s, the threat of typhus and cholera was very real for everyone, high and low in London, and the Ghost of Christmas Yet to Come is a memento mori, a reminder of the inevitability of death, but also a reminder of the fear of death and dying – because with death comes a reckoning, leading either to eternal reward or to eternal punishment. The ghost of Jacob Marley in Stave I revealed to Scrooge which fate he can expect unless he changes his ways. The Spirit shows Scrooge how his death will bring indifference to others at best and joy at its worst; that those who build up treasures on earth will find that these same treasures have no worth after death. The only sorrow the Spirit can show in connection with the death of the unknown man is the death of Tiny Tim, the two deaths being linked in a way as yet unknown to Scrooge. Without becoming benevolent and charitable and without accepting redemption and salvation, Scrooge will suffer the same fate as Marley, weighed down by chains and cash boxes and ledgers and cursed to walk the Earth. He must accept and "honour Christmas in [his] heart".

== Visions of the future ==
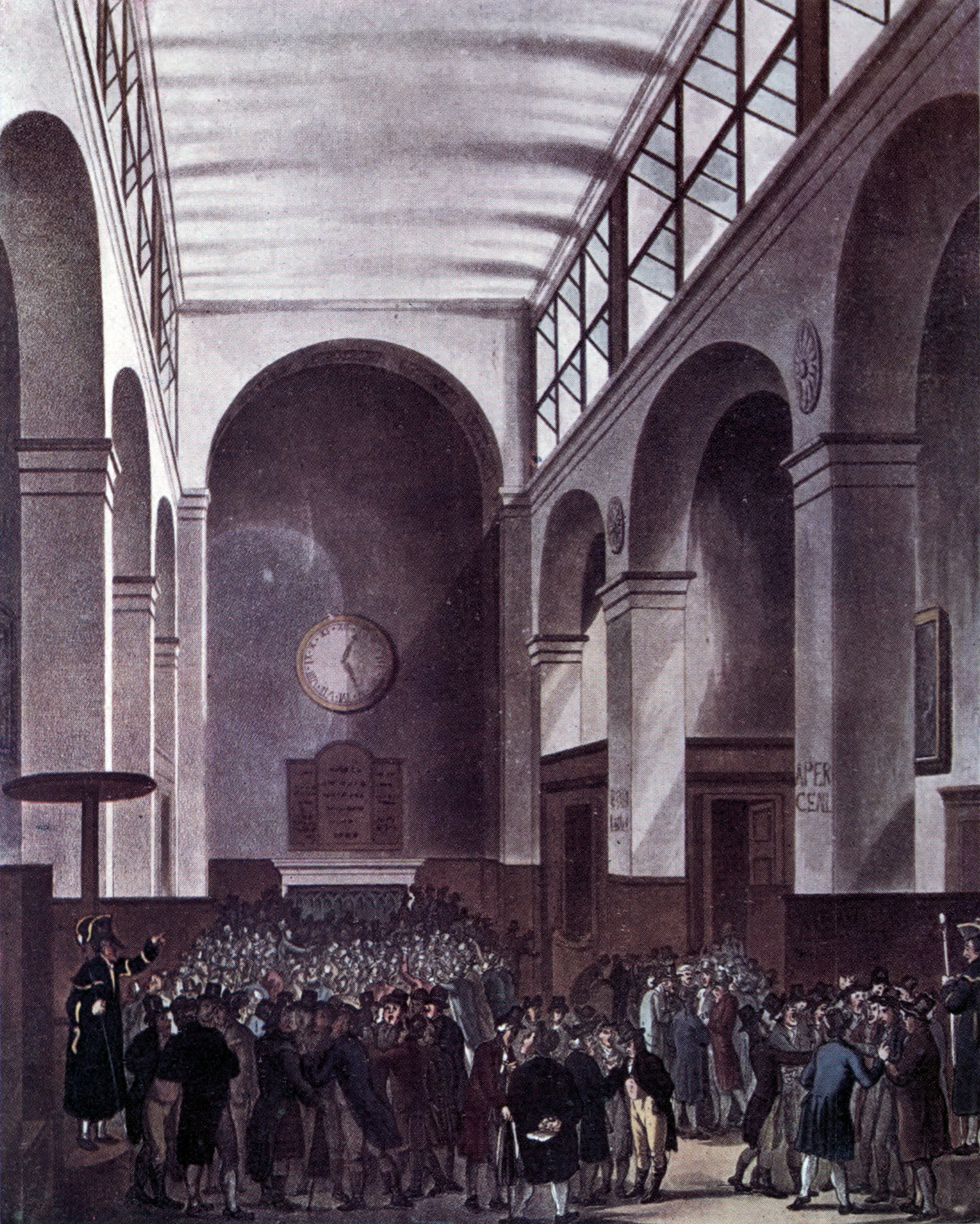
The London Stock Exchange in 1810.

In Stave IV, the Spirit takes Scrooge to locations around London, including the London Stock Exchange; Bob Cratchit's home; Old Joe's rag-and-bone shop, and a dead man under a sheet. In these scenes, Dickens uses mirroring, for as the Spirit reveals the visions of the future to Scrooge, he fails to recognise what the reader has already seen – that Scrooge sees his future; that the un-mourned dead man is himself; that the bedcurtains in the rag-and-bone shop are his; that the cheap funeral discussed by the city businessmen at the Exchange is his own; that he is the creditor whose death brings hope and relief to an indebted young couple. Scrooge is affected by the significance of these visions of the future, realising that the wretched dead man might be himself, and he implores the Spirit to show tenderness connected with a death; the ghost shows him the Cratchit family mourning the death of Tiny Tim, revealing the identity of the dead man. In the final scene in Stave IV, Scrooge finds himself in a churchyard where the Spirit points at a gravestone:

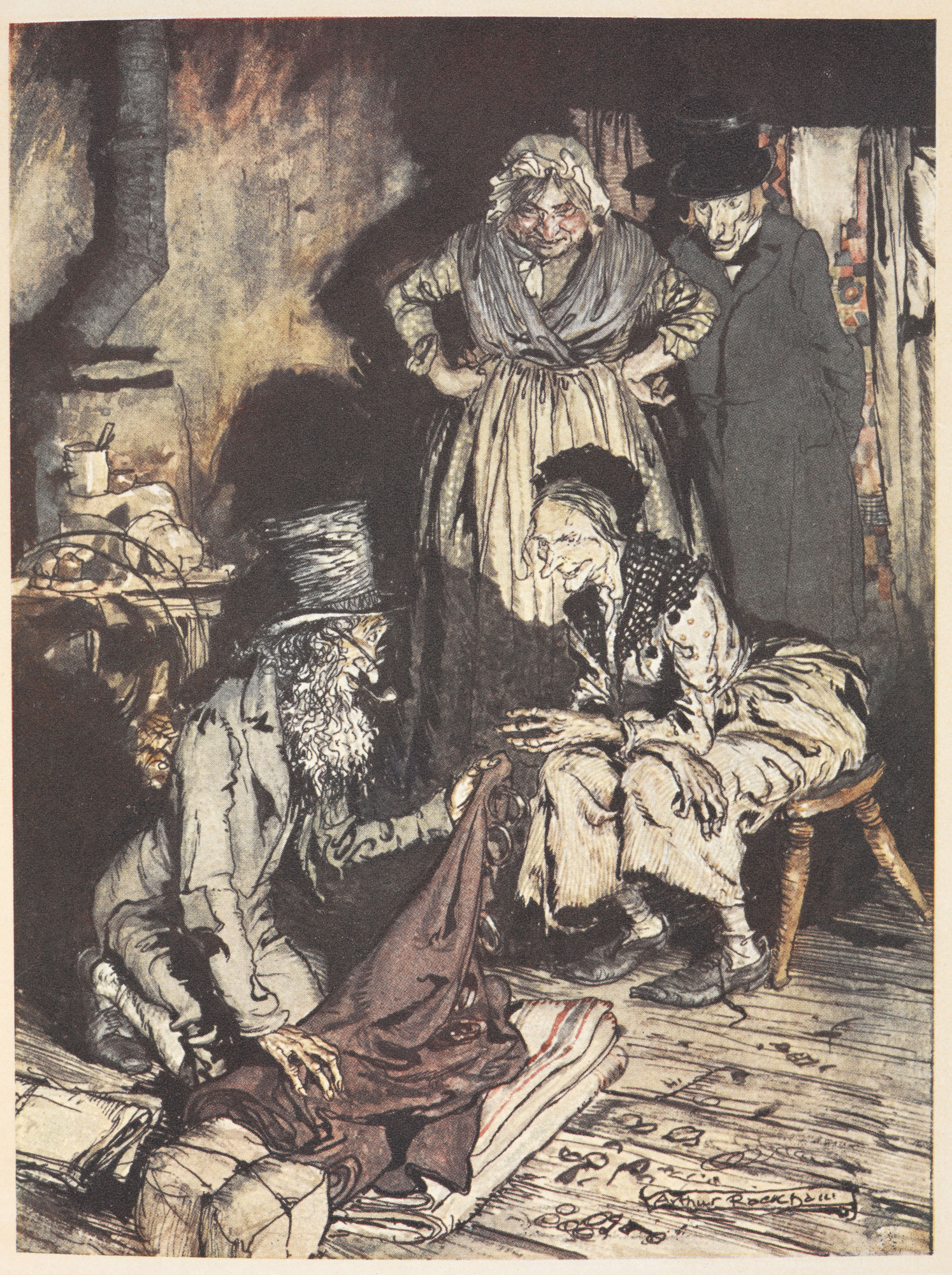
Scrooge's bedcurtains are examined in Old Joe's rag-and-bone shop – illustration by Arthur Rackham (1915).

The Spirit stood among the graves, and pointed down to One. He advanced towards it trembling. The Phantom was exactly as it had been, but he dreaded that he saw new meaning in its solemn shape.

"Before I draw nearer to that stone to which you point," said Scrooge, "answer me one question. Are these the shadows of the things that Will be, or are they shadows of things that May be, only?"

Still, the Ghost pointed downward to the grave by which it stood.

"Men's courses will foreshadow certain ends, to which, if persevered in, they must lead," said Scrooge. "But if the courses be departed from, the ends will change. Say it is thus with what you show me."

The Spirit was immovable as ever.

Scrooge crept towards it, trembling as he went; and following the finger, read upon the stone of the neglected grave his own name, EBENEZER SCROOGE.

"Am I that man who lay upon the bed?", he cried, upon his knees.

The finger pointed from the grave to him, and back again.

"No, Spirit! Oh no, no!"

The finger still was there.

"Spirit!", he cried, tight clutching at its robe, "hear me. I am not the man I was. I will not be the man I must have been but for this intercourse. Why show me this, if I am past all hope?"

For the first time, the hand appeared to shake.

"Good Spirit," he pursued, as down upon the ground he fell before it: "Your nature intercedes for me, and pities me. Assure me that I yet may change these shadows you have shown me, by an altered life."

The kind hand trembled.

"I will honour Christmas in my heart, and try to keep it all the year. I will live in the Past, the Present, and the Future. The Spirits of all Three shall strive within me. I will not shut out the lessons that they teach. Oh, tell me I may sponge away the writing on this stone!"

In his agony, he caught the spectral hand. It sought to free itself, but he was strong in his entreaty, and detained it. The Spirit, stronger yet, repulsed him.

Holding up his hands in a last prayer to have his fate reversed, he saw an alteration in the Phantom’s hood and dress. It shrunk, collapsed, and dwindled down into a bedpost.

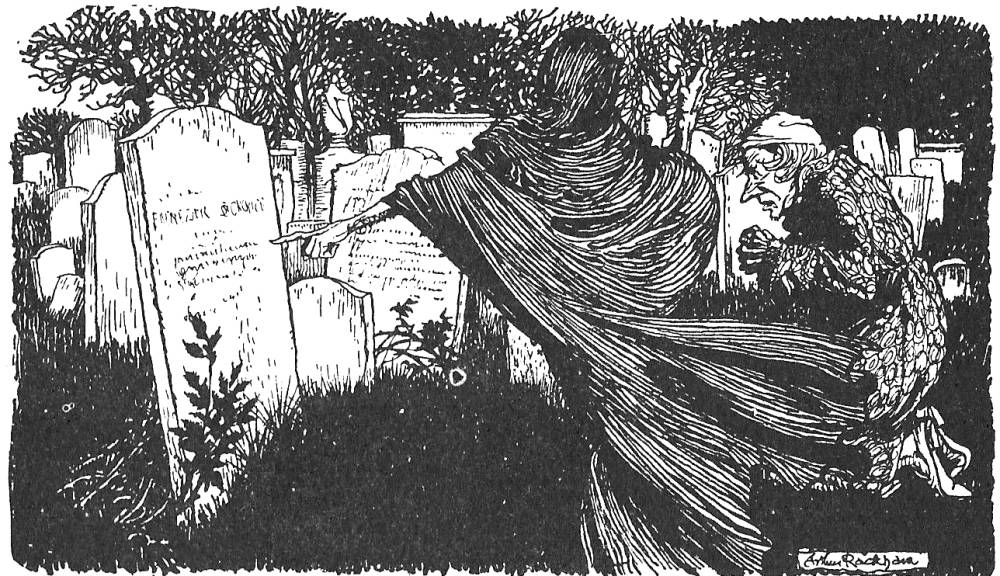
Scrooge encounters his fate – illustration by Arthur Rackham (1915).

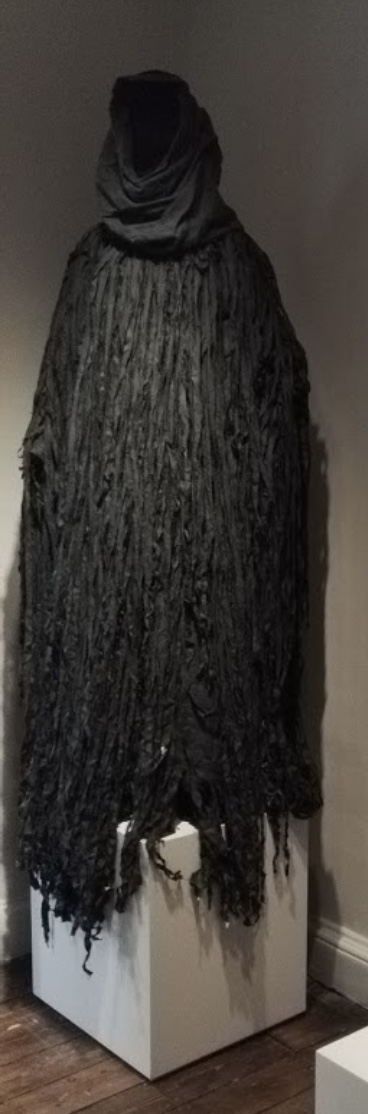
Costume for the Ghost of Christmas Yet-to-Come from The Man Who Invented Christmas (2017) – displayed at the Charles Dickens Museum.

The Ghost of Christmas Yet to Come reveals to Scrooge the future consequences of his past and present actions: his lack of sympathy for the poor; his ill-treatment of his clerk Bob Cratchit; that the Cratchit's family poor health will result in the death of the Cratchits' disabled young son, Tiny Tim. Scrooge's past and present actions have left him "solitary as an oyster", and his lonely death is revealed, with no one to mourn and having become an opportunity for others to profit – if only with a free lunch. The last of the Spirits gives Scrooge a final chance at redemption, to start life anew, and to make reparation to his nephew Fred, to the Cratchits, and the poor of London – his "fellow passengers to the grave". His redemption complete, Scrooge will "live in the Past, the Present, and the Future."

== See also ==
- Jacob Marley
- Ghost of Christmas Past
- Ghost of Christmas Present

== Sources ==
- Ackroyd, Peter (1990). Dickens. London: Sinclair-Stevenson. ISBN 978-1-85619-000-8.
- Callow, Simon (2009). Dickens' Christmas: A Victorian Celebration. London: Frances Lincoln. ISBN 978-0-7112-3031-6.
- Childs, Peter; Tredell, Nicolas (2006). Charles Dickens. Basingstoke, Hampshire: Palgrave Macmillan. ISBN 978-1-4039-1919-9.
- Dickens, Charles. A Christmas Carol (and Other Christmas Writings). Edited introduction by Michael Slater. Penguin Classics
- Hearn, Michael P. (1989). The Annotated Christmas Carol / A Christmas Carol by Charles Dickens; illustrated by John Leech; with an introduction, notes and bibliography by Michael Patrick Hearn. Avenel Books. New York. ISBN 0-517-68780-1.
- Ledger, Sally (2007). Dickens and the Popular Radical Imagination. Cambridge: Cambridge University Press. ISBN 978-0-521-84577-9.
- Lee, Imogen. "Ragged Schools". British Library. Archived from the original on 15 July 2014.
