= Adaptations of A Christmas Carol =

Works based on Charles Dickens's 1843 novella

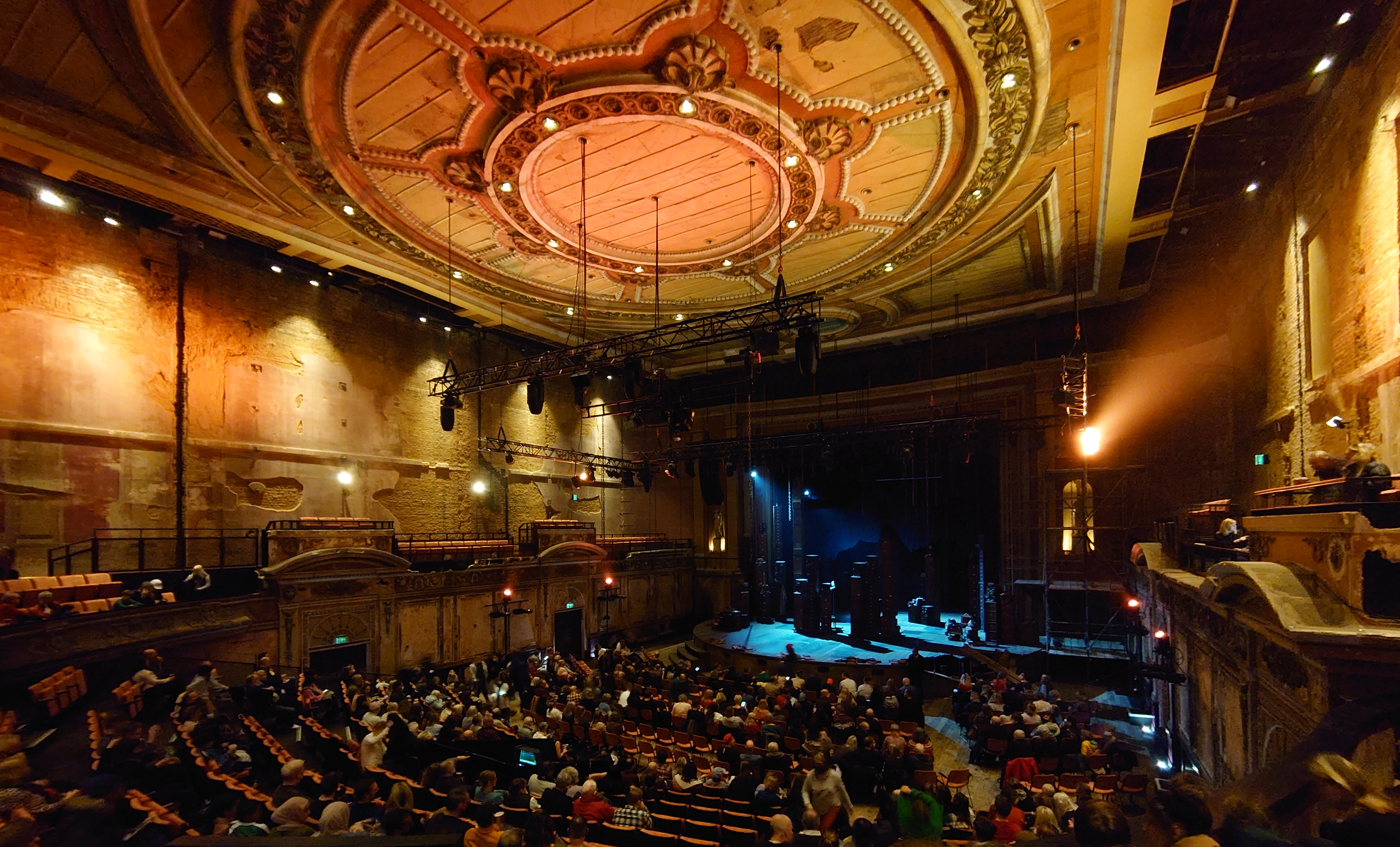
The stage at Alexandra Palace Theatre in London set for a performance of A Christmas Carol in December 2021.

A Christmas Carol, the 1843 novella by Charles Dickens (1812–1870), is one of the English author's best-known works. It is the story of Ebenezer Scrooge, a greedy miser who hates Christmas but who is transformed into a caring, kindly person through the visitations of four ghosts (Jacob Marley and the ghosts of Christmas past, present, and future). The classic work has been dramatised and adapted countless times for virtually every medium and performance genre, and new versions appear regularly.

== Public readings ==
The novel was the subject of Dickens's first public reading, given in Birmingham Town Hall to the Industrial and Literary Institute on 27 December 1853. This was repeated three days later to an audience of 'working people', and was a great success by his own account and that of newspapers of the time. Over the years, Dickens edited and adapted the piece for a listening, rather than reading, audience. Dickens continued to give public readings of A Christmas Carol until his death.

Public readings of the novel continue to be held today, with some readers performing in character as Dickens. In 1994, a public reading was performed at the Pierpont Morgan Library in New York City and broadcast on PBS, with James Earl Jones performing the role of Scrooge with Martin Sheen (who played all the other parts) and Robert MacNeil (who acted as commentator at different times).

== Performing arts ==
=== Theatre or stage ===
==== Direct adaptations ====
- An early theatrical production was A Christmas Carol: Or, the Miser's Warning!, a two-act adaptation of A Christmas Carol by C. Z. Barnett, first produced at the Surrey Theatre on 5 February 1844, just weeks after the publication of the novella. A version by Edward Stirling, A Christmas Carol; or, Past, Present, and Future, sanctioned by Charles Dickens, opened at the Adelphi Theatre in London on 26 February 1844, running for more than 40 nights.
- Throughout the late 19th century and into the early years of the 20th, British actor Seymour Hicks toured England with his own non-musical adaptation of the story, in which he played Scrooge.
- A Christmas Carol: Scrooge and Marley (1980), a theatrical adaptation by playwright Israel Horovitz, starred Orson Bean as Scrooge and premiered at the Charles Playhouse in Boston. The following year, Gene Rayburn played Scrooge.
- A Christmas Carol (1981), a musical adaptation with music by Michel Legrand and a book and lyrics by Sheldon Harnick that premiered in 1982 at the Hartman Theatre, Stamford, Connecticut. The show was adapted for a touring production in 1981.
- A Christmas Carol (1988), Patrick Stewart's one-man reading/acting of the story, made its first appearance in London and later on Broadway. On stage Stewart used a table, chair, stool, lectern and a book with an oversized print cover to enact the entire story. The production has been revived in London and New York several times. It has also been released on compact disc.
- Scrooge: The Musical (1992), a British stage musical adapted from the 1970 film and starring Anthony Newley.
- A Christmas Carol (1993–present), a one-man show of the work performed by Gerald Charles Dickens, great-great-grandson of Charles Dickens, in which he plays 26 characters.
- A Christmas Carol: The Musical (1994), a Broadway adaptation with music by Alan Menken and lyrics by Lynn Ahrens, ran at The Theatre at Madison Square Garden, New York City yearly until 2003. Starring as "Scrooge" were Walter Charles (1994), Terrence Mann (1995), Tony Randall (1996), Hal Linden and Roddy McDowall (alternating) (1997), Roger Daltrey (1998), Tony Roberts (1999), Frank Langella (2000), Tim Curry (2001), F. Murray Abraham (2002) and Jim Dale (2003). The 2004 television version of the musical starred Kelsey Grammer as "Scrooge".
- A Christmas Carol (2000–19), an adaptation written by Tom Wood for Citadel Theatre. The play ran seasonally for nineteen years before being replaced with a new version by playwright David van Belle
- Steve Nallon's Christmas Carol (2003), theatrical adaptation starring impressionist Nallon as a number of famous people performing the roles of Dickens's characters.
- A Christmas Carol (2007), a stage adaptation by Jacqueline Goldfinger, was commissioned by the North Coast Repertory Theatre. It is a one-act play which includes much of the original text of the novella along with several familiar Christmas hymns.
- A Christmas Carol (2008), a stage adaptation by Bryony Lavery with songs by Jason Carr, was written for the Chichester Youth Theatre and performed at Chichester Festival Theatre for Christmas 2008 and 2015. This adaptation was also performed by Birmingham Repertory Theatre for Christmas 2009 (with Peter Polycarpou as Scrooge, Hadley Fraser as Bob Cratchit and Rosalie Craig as Mrs Cratchit) and 2013 and the West Yorkshire Playhouse for Christmas 2010 (with Phillip Whitchurch as Scrooge).
- A Christmas Carol (2008), an adaptation written and directed by Kevin Von Feldt and staged at The Kodak Theater. The cast included Christopher Lloyd as Scrooge, John Goodman as The Ghost of Christmas Present, Jane Leeves as Mrs. Cratchit, with pre-recorded narration from John Gielgud.
- A Christmas Carol (2009), an adaptation written and directed by Susie McKenna and featuring original music by Steve Edis. In this adaptation, the story is presented as a play-within-a-play, as told by a miserly uncle and his nephew while locked inside a theatre. The play was performed at Arts Theatre and starred comedian Gareth Hale as Scrooge/Uncle Sidney.
- A Christmas Carol (2011), a National Theatre of Scotland production adapted, designed and directed by Graham McLaren, premiered at Film City Glasgow. The production was awarded Best Production and Best Ensemble by the Critics' Awards for Theatre in Scotland.
- A Christmas Carol (2012), a musical adaptation with book and lyrics by Ben Horslen and John Risebero and music by Christopher Peake and Nick Barstow, first performed by Antic Disposition in Middle Temple Hall, London, in December 2012 and revived in 2014, 2015, 2017 and 2019. A cast recording featuring Brian Blessed as The Ghost of Christmas Present was released in 2019.
- A Christmas Carol (2015), an adaptation by Patrick Barlow, starring Jim Broadbent as "Scrooge" at Noël Coward Theatre in London.
- A Christmas Carol (2017), a version by Jack Thorne, directed by Matthew Warchus for The Old Vic. The production has returned to the Old Vic every year since and performed on Broadway (winning 5 Tony Awards) and worldwide.
- A Christmas Carol (2017), an adaptation by David Edgar for the Royal Shakespeare Company. In this version, the writing of the original novella is used as a frame-narrative as Dickens is urged by his editor John Forster to weave a tale around his outrage about child labour and poverty. The original production premiered with Phil Davis as Scrooge. The production was revived in 2018 with Aden Gillett as Scrooge, and again in 2022 with Adrian Edmondson as Scrooge.
- Charles Dickens' A Christmas Carol (2018), a one-man adaptation of the story performed by Jefferson Mays at Geffen Playhouse, Los Angeles. In 2020, the show was filmed live at New York's United Palace and released for a limited time on streaming site on the Stage. The show premiered at Broadway's Nederlander Theatre in November 2022.
- Charles Dickens' A Christmas Carol (2018), an adaptation by Nelle Lee for Shake & Stir Theatre Co, Brisbane. The play premiered at the Queensland Performing Arts Centre and included Eugene Gilfedder as Scrooge, Lee as Mrs. Cratchit, and Bryan Probets as all four ghosts. Since then, the play has received seasonal revivals.
- A Christmas Carol (2018–present), an adaptation written by Jim McClure for American Shakespeare Center. The play premiered at the Blackfriars Playhouse for the 2018 Christmas season and has since been revived annually.
- A Christmas Carol (2020), an adaptation written by Naylah Ahmed for Jermyn Street Theatre. The play was performed online during the COVID-19 lockdowns, and included Jim Findley as Scrooge, Penelope Keith as The Ghost of Christmas Past, and Brian Blessed as The Ghost of Christmas Present.
- A Christmas Carol: The Live Radio Play (2020), a site specific adaptation written by Leora Morris and Ben Coleman and produced by Alliance Theatre. The production was presented as a drive-in performance at Georgia State University's Center Parc Credit Union, with the audience watching the show on big screens from their cars.
- A Christmas Carol (2020), an adaptation by Nicholas Hytner for Bridge Theatre. The production was performed as a three hander by Simon Russell Beale, Patsy Ferran and Eben Figueiredo, with the actors narrating and acting out Dickens's text. The production was revived in 2022.
- A Christmas Carol: A Ghost Story (2021), an adaptation by Mark Gatiss (who also played Marley), directed by Adam Penford ran at the Nottingham Playhouse and then Alexandra Palace Theatre for Christmas 2021 season
- A Christmas Carol (2022), a stage adaptation written by Morgan Lloyd Malcolm with songs by Eamonn O'Dwyer, was performed at Rose Theatre Kingston with Penny Layden as a gender-swapped Ebenezer Scrooge.
- A Christmas Carol (2022), an adaptation by Hilary Bell for Ensemble Theatre, Sydney. The original cast included Bell's father John Bell as Scrooge.
- A Christmas Carol – A Radio Play Live on Stage (2023), an adaptation by Martin Parsons for The Crime and Comedy Theatre Company. The cast included Colin Baker as Scrooge and Peter Purves as Charles Dickens, with Tom Baker joining the cast as Jacob Marley in 2024 in a specially filmed appearance.
- A Christmas Carol (2024), an adaptation by Mike Kenny for Derby Theatre.

==== Derivative ====
- Mrs. Bob Cratchit's Wild Christmas Binge (2002) is a musical parody of A Christmas Carol. Written by Christopher Durang, the play was initially commissioned by City Theatre in Pittsburgh, Pennsylvania, when Durang was asked by Artistic Director Tracy Brigden to write a Christmas comedy. It premiered on 7 November 2002 at the City Theatre, with Kristine Nielsen in the title role. This parody was revived in 2012 with additional performances in 2013
- A Klingon Christmas Carol (written c. 2006) is an adaptation set on the Klingon homeworld of Qo'noS in the Star Trek fictional universe. The play was co-written and directed by Christopher O. Kidder and was performed from 2007–2010 by Commedia Beauregard, (a Saint Paul, Minnesota theatre company), and also presented in Chicago for 2010.
- An American Country Christmas Carol (2010), a musical adaptation with book and lyrics by Scott Logsdon and music by Rand Bishop, Kent Blazy, Roxie Dean, Tim Finn, Billy Kirsch, J. Fred Knobloch, and Pam Rose. It was presented as a staged reading at the Boiler Room Theatre in Franklin, Tennessee, on 5, 6, and 13 December 2010.
- A Christmas Carol (2013–present) an annual production written by Kevin Moriarty for Dallas Theater Center. In this adaptation, Scrooge is changed from a money lender in London's business district to the owner of a factory in the industrialised Midlands.
- Charles Dickens Writes A Christmas Carol (2015), an adaptation by Richard Quesnel, by Lost and Found Theater inc, at The Conrad Center for the Performing Arts in Kitchener, Canada. This adaptation tells the story of how A Christmas Carol came to be written, as well as the story of A Christmas Carol.
- Scrooge in Love! (2016), a musical written by Duane Poole (music by Larry Grossman and lyrics by Kellan Blair) in which Ebenezer Scrooge, rather than being miserly, sees money as a cure-all and takes generosity overboard.
- A Christmas Carol (2017), a new adaptation by Deborah McAndrew, directed by Amy Leach for Hull Truck Theatre. This production transferred to the Leeds Playhouse for Christmas 2018, and it returned during the Christmas 2020 season. This version relocates the story to the North of Victorian England.
- A Christmas Carol (2019–present), an adaptation written by David van Belle for Citadel Theatre. The adaptation relocates the story to the post-World War II United States, where Scrooge is the owner of a department store.
- A Christmas Carol (2019), performed in the Royal Lyceum Theatre in Edinburgh, relocates the play to Edinburgh, with a notable change to the plot being the addition of Greyfriars Bobby.
- Dolly Parton's Smoky Mountain Christmas Carol (2019); stage musical with music and lyrics by Dolly Parton and book by David H. Bell, set during the 1930s in the Smoky Mountains of East Tennessee, this production imagines Ebenezer Scrooge as the owner of a mining company town. Performed at Boston's Emerson Colonial Theatre in 2019, also Stanley Industrial Alliance Stage in 2021 and the Southbank Centre in 2022.
- A Christmas Carol (2020), a film adaptation by David and Jacqui Morris. A grandmother narrates the story to her children as the children prepare a toy theatre for their annual performance of A Christmas Carol. Simon Russell Beale is the voice of Scrooge.
- A Christmas Carol Live (2020), a filmed version of Jefferson Mays' one man show adaptation of the story. The show was filmed at United Palace in New York and later released for a limited time on the streaming site On The Stage.
- A Calico Christmas Carol (2023–present), a 40-minute melodrama created for the Knott's Berry Farm theme park, relocating the story to the Scrooge & Marley Railroad Co. in late 19th century Calico, California. Features the popular song "I'll Be Home for Christmas".
- Filthy Lucre: A Burlesque Christmas Carol (2023–present), a reimagining by Jonny Porkpie retaining much of Dickens's original text, which reveals "Ebeneza" Scrooge's business to be a Gentleman's Club that has foresworn the "Art of Striptease". Revived from Pinchbottom Burlesque's original 2009 production at Walkerspace in Soho Rep, the "risqué burlesque-theater adaptation" was presented in 2023 at the Laurie Beechman Theater, and in 2024 at Drag Club Lips NYC starring Scout Durwood as Scrooge, Tigger! as Jacob Marley, and Jo Weldon as the Ghost of Classic Burlesque.
- A Very Jewish Christmas Carol (2023), a comedic play written by Elise Esther Hearst and Phillip Kavanagh, and produced by Melbourne Theatre Company. This adaptation relocates the story to present day Melbourne, and takes place during Chrismukkah. The play blends elements of the original Dickens story with contemporary Christmas culture and Jewish folklore, such as having the three ghosts represented by a Rein-Dybbuk, a Gingerbread Golem, and Lilith Claus
- Christmas Carol Goes Wrong (2025), comedy play by Henry Shields, Henry Lewis and Jonathan Sayer of Mischief Theatre. The fictitious Cornley Polytechnic Drama Society attempts to put on a stage adaptation of A Christmas Carol which is ruined by amateurism and personal rivalries. Based on Mischief's 2017 BBC TV special.

=== Opera ===
- A Christmas Carol (1962), an opera by Edwin Coleman with libretto by Margaret Burns Harris. Broadcast by BBC Television on 24 December 1962, performed by the Pro Arte Orchestra with Stephen Manton and Trevor Anthony. The opera was described by viewers as 'weird', 'modern', 'off-key', with 'not a single tuneful aria of any length'.
- A Christmas Carol (2014), a one-man opera composed by Iain Bell and set to a libretto by Simon Callow. It was written for Houston Grand Opera and performed at Wortham Theater Center with tenor Jay Hunter Morris as the narrator. In 2015, Welsh National Opera presented the opera at the Wales Millennium Centre in Cardiff with Mark le Brocq as the narrator.
- A Christmas Carol (2022), an opera composed by Graeme Koehne and set to a libretto by Anna Goldsworthy. In this adaptation, the story is relocated to present day Melbourne, and features a number of references to Australian culture (such as The Ghost of Christmas Present being portrayed as a surf lifesaver). The opera was produced by Victorian Opera, and ran for four performances at the Palais Theatre in mid-December.

=== Ballet ===
==== Derivative ====
- On Christmas Night (1926), a masque by choreographer Adolph Bolm and composer Ralph Vaughan Williams, loosely based on A Christmas Carol. Combining singing, dance and mime, it premiered in Chicago on December 26, 1926, performed by the Bolm Ballet and conducted by Eric DeLamarter.
- An American Christmas Carol (2014), a ballet that relocates the story to post World War II America. Produced by Ballet Fantastique, the score included the music of Frank Sinatra, Ella Fitzgerald and Nat King Cole and was performed by Jazz singer Halie Loren. A filmed version of the ballet was released in 2020.

== Film and TV adaptations ==
=== Live-action theatrical films ===
==== Direct adaptations ====
Scrooge, or, Marley's Ghost (1901)

- Scrooge, or, Marley's Ghost (1901), starring Daniel Smith as Scrooge. A short, silent, British film produced by Paul's Animatograph Works, regarded as the earliest surviving film adaptation of A Christmas Carol.
- A Christmas Carol (1908), starring Thomas Ricketts as Scrooge. Produced in Chicago by Essanay Studios, and regarded as the earliest adaptation produced in the US. The film is regarded as lost.
- A Christmas Carol (1910), starring Marc McDermott as Scrooge and Charles Ogle as Bob Cratchit, with William Bechtel, Viola Dana, Carey Lee, and Shirley Mason. A 13-minute version produced by Edison Studios in The Bronx, New York.
- Il sogno dell'usuraio (1910), an Italian silent film.
- Scrooge (1913), starring Seymour Hicks as Scrooge. Hicks also starred in the 1935 adaptation. Produced in Britain by the Zenith Film Company, the film was re-titled Old Scrooge for its 1926 US release.
- The Right to Be Happy (1916), directed by and starring Rupert Julian as Scrooge. Regarded as the first feature-length adaptation. The film is regarded as lost.
- Scrooge (1935), starring Seymour Hicks as Scrooge, Donald Calthrop as Bob Cratchit, and Philip Frost as Tiny Tim. Hicks had previously starred in the 1913 adaptation. This film was produced in Britain by Julius Hagen Productions, and released that same year in the United States by Paramount Pictures. An hourlong edition was released to schools and libraries in 1941; many video versions derive from this edited version.
- A Christmas Carol (1938), a US version starring Reginald Owen as Scrooge, Terry Kilburn as Tiny Tim, and Gene Lockhart and Kathleen Lockhart as the Cratchits. Produced and released by Metro-Goldwyn-Mayer.
- A Christmas Carol (1940), starring Gregory Markopoulos as Scrooge. Notable for being the first known amateur film adaptation.
- Scrooge (1951), retitled A Christmas Carol in the US, starring Alastair Sim as Scrooge, Michael Hordern as Jacob Marley, Mervyn Johns as Bob Cratchit, and Hermione Baddeley as Mrs. Emily Cratchit. Critic A. O. Scott of The New York Times regarded this film as the best adaptation ever made of the Dickens classic.
- A Christmas Carol (1960), a British short film directed by Robert Hartford-Davis.
- Scrooge (1970), a musical film adaptation starring Albert Finney as Scrooge and Alec Guinness as Marley's Ghost.
- The Muppet Christmas Carol (1992), a musical film featuring The Muppets, with Michael Caine as Scrooge.
- The Passion of Scrooge (2018), a film adaptation by H. Paul Moon of the opera by Jon Deak, featuring the composer with baritone William Sharp and the 21st Century Consort.
- A Christmas Carol (2020), a British Christmas drama dance film directed by Jacqui Morris and David Morris.
- Ebenezer (2026), an adaptation by Ti West starring Johnny Depp as Ebenezer Scrooge.

==== Derivative ====
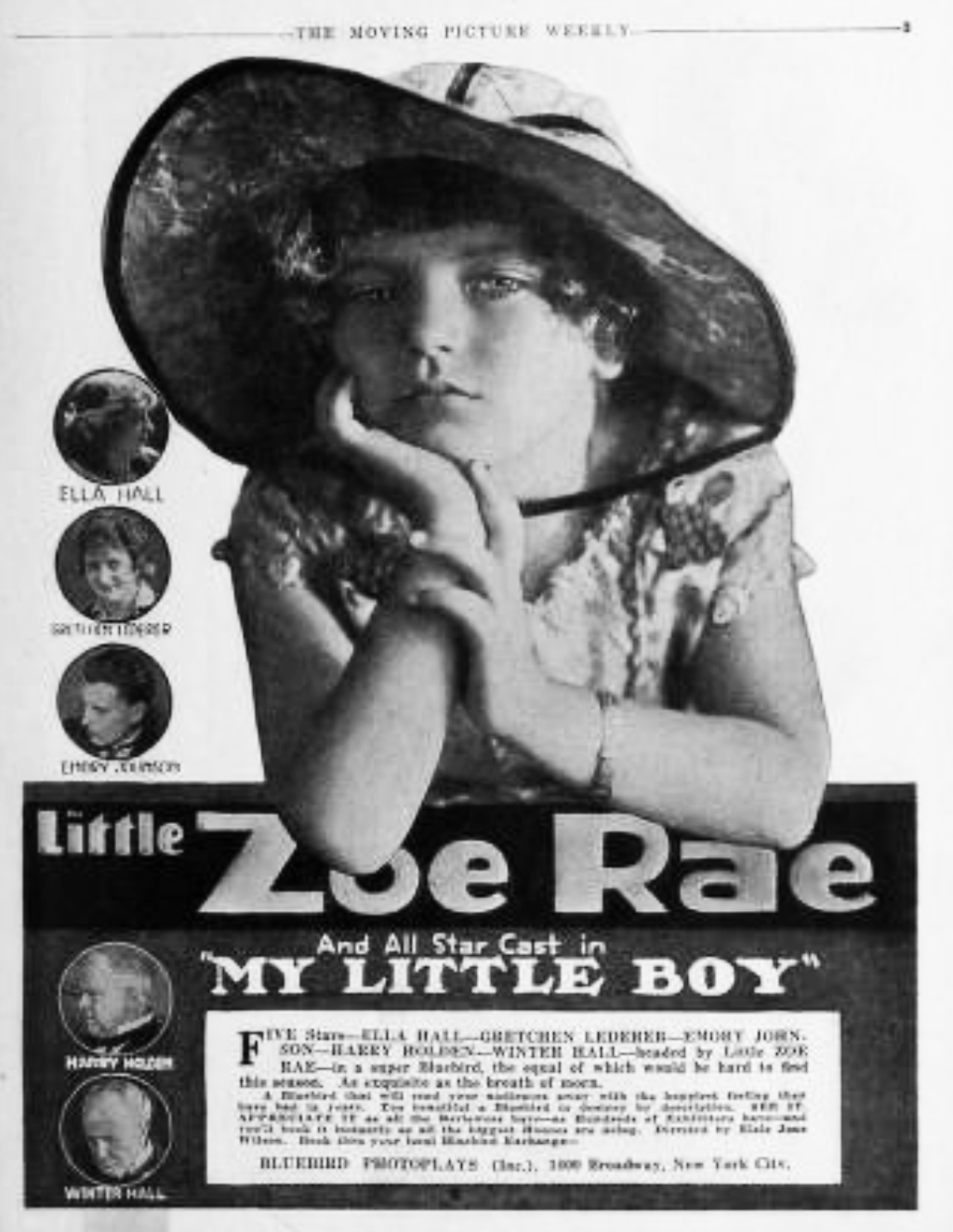
My Little Boy (1917)

- My Little Boy (1917), a composite of A Christmas Carol and Little Boy Blue.
- The Strange Christmas Dinner (1949), a modern adaptation that sets the play in a New York restaurant.
- It's Never Too Late (1953), Italian adaptation of Dickens's novel, featuring Paolo Stoppa and Marcello Mastroianni.
- The Passions of Carol (1975), starring Mary Stuart as Carol Screwge and Marc Stevens as Marley. A pornographic adaptation.
- Scrooged (1988), a modern retelling that follows Bill Murray as Frank Cross, a cynical and selfish television executive who produces a live Christmas Eve show. The film also stars Karen Allen, John Forsythe, Bobcat Goldthwait, Carol Kane, Robert Mitchum, Michael J. Pollard and Alfre Woodard.
- Surviving Christmas (2004), a romantic comedy about a wealthy advertising executive who hires a suburban family to be his pretended family. The film ends with the main characters seeing a community theatre production of A Christmas Carol. Earlier in the film, the executive also hires the actor who plays Scrooge in the production to be his pretended grandfather.
- A Dennis the Menace Christmas (2007), Mr. Wilson is shown by an angel his past, the present, and the possible future if he does not change his ways.
- Ghosts of Girlfriends Past (2009), a romantic comedy film starring Matthew McConaughey as the Scrooge-like character "Connor Mead".
- Scrooge & Marley (2012), a gay film adaptation featuring David Pevsner as Ebenezer "Ben" Scrooge
- My Dad Is Scrooge (2014), a fantasy film about talking animals using the novella to help a Scrooge-like father (played by Brian Cook) see the error of his ways.
- The Man Who Invented Christmas (2017), a film about Charles Dickens's struggle to write the book while dealing with his personal life with his characters, especially Ebenezer Scrooge (played by Christopher Plummer), seeming to haunt him with their opinions.
- Canaan Land is a 2020 American comedy-drama film written and directed by Richard Rossi and starring Richard Rossi and Rebecca Holden. It is based on the novel of the same name by Rossi about a greedy con man who muses on the Dickens story. He is confronted by the true meaning of Christmas and the opportunity for redemption.
- Spirited (2022), a modern musical comedy re-imagining focused on the perspective of the Ghosts, with Will Ferrell as the Ghost of Christmas Present and Ryan Reynolds as the person visited by the ghosts.
- A Christmas Karen (2022), a comedic modern adaptation with a stock Karen, played by Michele Simms, as the person seeing the error of her ways.
- Utshob (2025), a Bangladeshi comedy drama adapted from the story, where a businessman revisits scenes from his life with the help of three ghosts.
- Christmas Karma (2025), a British Bollywood-inspired musical adaptation of the story starring Kunal Nayyar as the Scrooge-like character of Eshaan Sood.

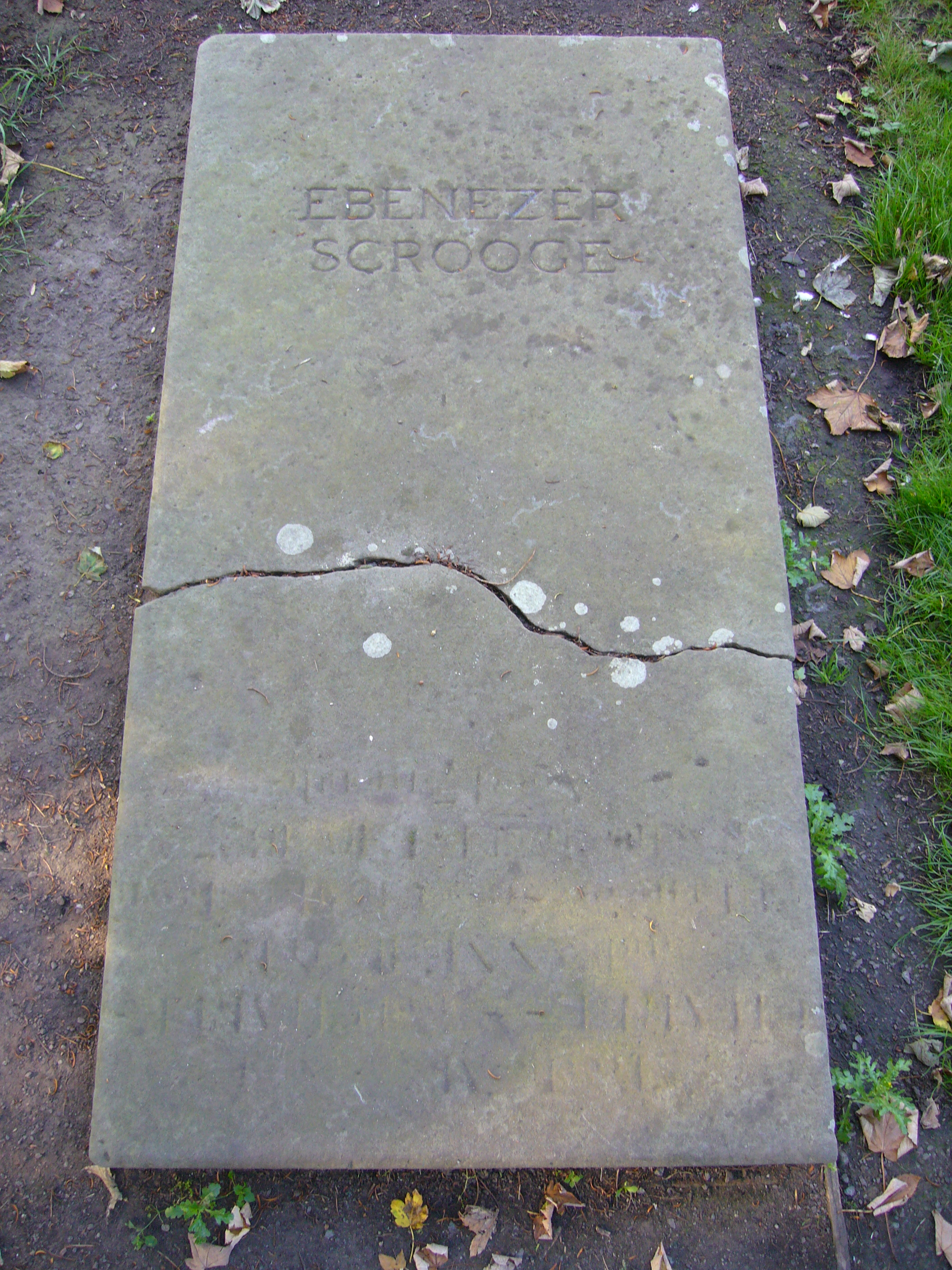
Replica tombstone from the 1984 adaptation, still in situ at St Chad's Church, Shrewsbury, 2008. The stone was vandalised in November 2024 and its future remains uncertain.

- Marley (TBA), an upcoming musical film by Walt Disney Pictures, which will adapt A Christmas Carol through Jacob Marley's perspective. Bill Condon will write and direct the film.

=== Live-action television ===
==== Direct adaptations ====
===== Live TV =====
Between 1943 and 1956, the majority of the TV specials were staged live on television and not pre-recorded on film or videotape.

- A Christmas Carol (1943), starring William Podmore as Scrooge. Directed by George Lowther.
- An early live television adaptation was broadcast by DuMont Television Network's New York station WABD on 20 December 1944.
- Christmas Night, with a ballet and with music by Ralph Vaughan Williams was broadcast on BBC television on 25 December 1946.
- A 25 December 1947 live television version on DuMont starred John Carradine as Scrooge, and featured David Carradine and Eva Marie Saint, the latter in her TV debut.
- The Christmas Carol, broadcast 25 December 1949, is a 30-minute television adaptation that starred Taylor Holmes as Scrooge with Vincent Price as the on-screen narrator. Other cast: Robert Hyatt as Tiny Tim, Patrick Whyte as Bob Cratchit, Queenie Leonard as Mrs. Emily Cratchit, Constance Cavendish as Martha Cratchit, Jill St. John as Missie Cratchit, Karen Kester as Belinda Cratchit, and Robert Clarke as Fred.
- A Christmas Carol (1954), a filmed musical television adaptation starring Fredric March as Scrooge and Basil Rathbone as Marley, was shown on the TV anthology Shower of Stars. The adaptation and lyrics were by Maxwell Anderson, the music by Bernard Herrmann. The first version in colour, only a black-and-white version is currently known to survive. March received an Emmy Award nomination for his performance.
- Story of the Christmas Carol (1955), starring Norman Gottschalk as Scrooge. Directed by David Barnhizer.
- The Merry Christmas (1955), musical adaptation starring Hugh Griffith as Scrooge.
- The Stingiest Man in Town (1956) was the second musical adaptation. It starred Basil Rathbone and Vic Damone as, respectively, the old and young Scrooge. This was a live episode of the dramatic anthology series The Alcoa Hour.

===== Pre-recorded TV =====
From 1958, all live-action TV adaptations of A Christmas Carol were pre-recorded on videotape or film and then aired on television.

- The Merry Christmas (1958), starring Stephan Murray as Scrooge and directed by Ronald Marriott.
- Tales from Dickens: A Christmas Carol (1959), was another filmed episode of the half-hour anthology series, again featuring Rathbone as Scrooge, with Fredric March as narrator, produced by Desmond Davis, with the cooperation of The Dickensian Society, London, distributed by Coronet Films "Copyright 1959, Transcription Holdings Ltd.".
- Carol For Another Christmas (1964) was a modernised adaptation directed by Joseph L. Mankiewicz and written by Rod Serling for the American Broadcasting Company (ABC) network starring Sterling Hayden as the Scrooge character as well as Peter Sellers, Ben Gazzara, Robert Shaw, Pat Hingle, Steve Lawrence, Eva Marie Saint, James Shigeta and Britt Eckland.
- Carry On Christmas was broadcast in 1969. Scripted by long-term Carry On author Talbot Rothwell, the story was an irreverent take on the tale and featured Sid James as Scrooge.
- A Christmas Carol (1977), a BBC television film starring Michael Hordern as Scrooge.
- Rich Little's Christmas Carol (1978), an HBO television special in which impressionist Rich Little plays several celebrities and characters in the main roles.
- Scrooge (1978), starring Warren Graves as Scrooge.
- A Christmas Carol (1984), a Christmas fantasy television film directed by Clive Donner, who was an editor of the 1951 film Scrooge, and stars George C. Scott. It also features Frank Finlay, David Warner, and Susannah York. It was filmed in the historic medieval county town of Shrewsbury in Shropshire.
- Buckaneezer Scrooge (1985), starring Ron Barge as Buckaneezer Scrooge. This Canadian adaptation features real-life Scrooge interacting with puppet characters.
- Conto de Natal (1988), short film made for Portuguese television. Directed by Lauro António.
- Bah, Humbug!: The Story of Charles Dickens' 'A Christmas Carol' (1990), an abridged dramatic reading performed and recorded live at the Pierpont Morgan Library in New York City and broadcast on PBS. The production was based on Dickens's own adaptation for his dramatic readings. It was hosted by Robert MacNeil and featured James Earl Jones as Scrooge and Martin Sheen as the other characters.
- A Christmas Carol (1999), a television movie directed by David Jones, starring Patrick Stewart as Ebenezer Scrooge. Inspired by Patrick Stewart's one-man stage adaptation of the story but featuring a full supporting cast, this was the first version of the story to make use of digital special effects. Stewart was nominated for a Screen Actors Guild award for his performance.
- A Diva's Christmas Carol (2000) is a VH1-original Christmas television film starring Vanessa L. Williams, Rozonda "Chilli" Thomas, Brian McNamara and Kathy Griffin.
- A Christmas Carol: The Musical (2004), starring Kelsey Grammer. This version is unique in that Scrooge meets all three spirits in human form both before and after his night-time encounters, much like in the same vein as The Wizard of Oz.
- A Christmas Carol (2019), a BBC drama (broadcast in the US on FX) written by Peaky Blinders creator Steven Knight, with Guy Pearce as Scrooge, Andy Serkis as the Ghost of Christmas Past, Charlotte Riley as Lottie/the Ghost of Christmas Present, Stephen Graham as Jacob Marley, Joe Alwyn as Bob Cratchit, Jason Flemyng as the Ghost of Christmas Future, and Vinette Robinson as Mary Cratchit. Thea Achillea, who played Scrooge's daughter in episode 2, went on to star in A Christmas Carol, alongside Serkis. In that version, Serkis voiced Marley's Ghost.

==== Derivative ====
- Topper (1953); Henrietta reads A Christmas Carol to Topper and their guests. Topper falls asleep during the reading and dreams he is Scrooge.
- The Trail to Christmas (1957), a Western adaptation of the play directed by James Stewart.
- Rod Serling's A Carol for Another Christmas (1964) was a United Nations special sponsored by Xerox, with Sterling Hayden as Scrooge character Daniel Grudge.
- Bewitched (1967); in the episode "Humbug not be Spoken Here". Samantha takes a miserly client of Darrin's to the North Pole on Christmas Eve to meet Santa Claus.
- The Smothers Brothers Comedy Hour (1967); the episode aired on 24 December 1967 included an 18-minute parody sketch in which Tommy Smothers plays Ebenezer Scrooge III and Jack Benny plays Bob Cratchit.
- The Odd Couple (1970); in the episode "Scrooge Gets an Oscar", Felix and the other poker players become Dickens characters in a dream after Oscar refuses to be Scrooge in a children's play.
- Omnibus (1973), UK; "A Christmas Carol", a Dickens favourite as interpreted by mime artist Marcel Marceau.
- Little House on the Prairie (1975); in an episode that serves as a twist on the Dickens story, actor Ted Gehring plays "Ebenezer Sprague", a Scrooge-type self-centered and miserly banker who refuses to give and receive until a near-falling out with the Ingalls family over a loan (an analogue for the three Christmas ghosts) changes his ways.
- Sanford and Son (1975); in the episode "Ebenezer Sanford", tightfisted Fred gets a ghostly wake-up call in this spoof of "A Christmas Carol."
- The Six Million Dollar Man (1976); in "A Bionic Christmas Carol", Steve Austin uses his bionic abilities to make an old miser change his ways.
- An American Christmas Carol (1979), an adaptation starring Henry Winkler. Set in Depression era New England, the Scrooge character is named Benedict Slade.
- Skinflint: A Country Christmas Carol (1979), an American country music-inspired TV film starring Hoyt Axton as Cyrus Flint.
- WKRP in Cincinnati (1980); in the episode "Bah Humbug", Mr. Carlson plans to give the staffers no Christmas bonuses. But after eating one of Johnny Fever's "special" brownies, the ghosts of Christmas Past (Jennifer), Present (Venus) and Future (Johnny) visit him to show him the error of his ways.
- Alice (1981); in the episode "Mel's Christmas Carol", Mel Sharples is haunted by a former business partner Jake, after he fires the waitresses from his diner on Christmas Eve.
- Family Ties (1983); in the episode "A Keaton Christmas Carol", Alex finds the spirit of Christmas in a dream when he is shown visions of the past and future by ghosts of Mallory and Jennifer.
- Highway to Heaven (1984); in the episode "Another Song For Christmas", Jonathan and Mark become involved in their own version of Dickens's classic "Christmas Carol", involving a heartless used car salesman. Directed by Michael Landon.
- Scrooge's Rock 'N' Roll Christmas (1984), starring Jack Elam as Scrooge.
- Fame: (1985); in the episode "Ebenezer Morloch", Mr. Morloch falls asleep and is visited by three ghosts.
- George Burns Comedy Week: "A Christmas Carol II" (1985), an episode in which Scrooge is good-natured to a fault and all of Camden Town takes advantage of his generosity to the point of taking all his money. This prompts the spirits to return and make sure Scrooge achieves a balance between his past and current behaviour.
- Doctor Who – The Trial of a Time Lord (1986) – when the Doctor is put on trial by his own race, the Time Lords, they see evidence from the Doctor's past, present and future.
- A Different World (1989); in the episode "For Whom the Jingle Bell Tolls", Whitley plays the Scrooge role over her mother's plans to visit the French Riviera for Christmas. She receives visits from the ghosts of Christmas Past (Mr. Gaines), Present (Walter) and Future (Jaleesa).
- Mr. Belvedere (1989) in the episode "A Happy Guys Christmas" The Happy Guys of Pittsburgh are putting on their annual Christmas play and have decided on "A Christmas Carol". The entire Owens family is cast, but when Mr. Belvdere gets frustrated with the poor directing, he takes over the job, only to quit in a huff. This leads to Mr. Belvedere being visited by the Ghost of Christmas Past, Present and Future.
- Star Trek: The Next Generation (1991): "Devil's Due": Data plays Ebenezer Scrooge in a theatre performance.
- Ebbie (1995), a TV movie with the first female portrayal of Scrooge, starring Susan Lucci as Elizabeth "Ebbie" Scrooge, owner of a huge department store, and some of her own employees doubling as the three Christmas Spirits.
- Martin (1996); in the episode "Scrooge", Martin is visited by three Christmas spirits to encourage Martin's Christmas spirit and the joy of giving.
- Ms. Scrooge (1997), a TV movie starring Cicely Tyson as "Ebenita Scrooge", the managing director of a loan company, and Katherine Helmond as her deceased business partner Maude Marley.
- Ebenezer (1998), a Western version produced for Canadian TV, starring Jack Palance as land baron Ebenezer Scrooge.
- The Ghosts of Dickens' Past (1998), a mysterious girl (Jennifer Bertram) inspires Charles Dickens (Christopher Heyerdahl) to encourage charity and discourage child labour by writing A Christmas Carol.
- I Was a Sixth Grade Alien (2000); in "A Very Buttsman Christmas", Ms. Buttsman is in charge at the embassy and planning on cancelling Christmas. This upsets Pleskit and Tim very much, especially because it would be Pleskit's first. As Ms. Buttsman drifts off into a deep sleep, she is visited by the ghost of Christmas Present, Past and Future.
- A Christmas Carol; a TV-movie that takes place in the present where Ross Kemp plays Eddie Scrooge, a London loan shark. Jacob Marley (Ray Fearon) not only warns Scrooge of the three impending spirits, but doubles as the Ghost of Christmas Present.
- Scrooge & Marley (2001), a Christian-themed television film adaptation set in a fictional New England town called Winterset, Connecticut. It was directed by Fred Holmes and produced by the Coral Ridge Ministries, starring Dean Jones as Ebenezer Scrooge, who in this adaptation starts out as an atheist and a personal injury lawyer. Also adapted from the book What If Jesus Had Never Been Born? In the United States, the film aired on Trinity Broadcasting Network on 21 December 2001 and then 25 December; it also aired on syndicated stations on 24–25 December and then as part of The Coral Ridge Hour on 29–30 December and has since aired on TBN and other syndicated stations in subsequent years.
- A Carol Christmas (2003), another TV movie portraying Scrooge as an arrogant female celebrity, this time a TV talk show host named "Carol Cartman", played by Tori Spelling. Also featured were Dinah Manoff as Marla, Carol's stage mother-type aunt, Gary Coleman as the Ghost of Christmas Past, William Shatner as the Ghost of Christmas Present and an uncredited James Cromwell as the Ghost of Christmas Future.
- Chasing Christmas (2005), TV film with the Ghost of Christmas Past (Leslie Jordan) going AWOL, leaving the 'Scrooge' of this story (Tom Arnold) stuck in 1965.
- Nan's Christmas Carol (2009) is a spin-off of The Catherine Tate Show. The one-off special, based on Dickens's novella, is about Nan visited by three ghosts on Christmas night in her council flat.
- A Christmas Carol – the 2010 Christmas special episode of Doctor Who borrows elements from Dickens's novel, as the Eleventh Doctor attempts to make a miserly man who could save a crashing ship change his ways by influencing the man's past, culminating in him bringing the man's child-self into the future. Dialogue acknowledges the source, and Dickens himself has appeared as a character in two unrelated episodes.
- It's Always Sunny in Philadelphia (2010); in the episode "A Very Sunny Christmas," Dee and Dennis blame Frank for ruining their childhood Christmases, and try to teach him a lesson by staging a haunting by Frank's former business partner, whom Frank believes is dead.
- Suite Life on Deck (2010) "A London Carol": London is too selfish to give anything for homeless and sick children during Christmas when Cody and Bailey asked for donations for needy children. On Christmas Eve night, London's mirror takes her back to the past, the present and future to learn her lesson.
- Christmas Cupid (2010), made-for-TV movie starring Christina Milian as the Scrooge-inspired character "Sloane Spencer".
- It's Christmas, Carol! (2012), a made-for-TV movie starring Emmanuelle Vaugier as an arrogant Chicago-based book publisher; her former boss, Eve (Carrie Fisher) approaches her on Christmas Eve and functions as all three spirits, Past, Present and Yet To Come.
- Kelly Clarkson's Cautionary Christmas Music Tale (2013), an NBC television special loosely based on A Christmas Carol featuring Kelly Clarkson playing a Scrooge-like role.
- Classic Alice, a 2014–2015 web-series re-imagining with Alice playing Scrooge as she leads herself through the ghosts of past, present, and future to discover what she really wants.
- In the Upstart Crow 2018 Christmas special, A Crow Christmas Carol, William Shakespeare (played by David Mitchell) is told the story of A Christmas Carol by a mysterious stranger (played by Kenneth Branagh). Will then uses the premise to try and make the miserly Sir Robert Greene (played by Mark Heap) to become a better person, after which he allows 'some future author' to write the story instead as a gift.
- In the 2019 General Hospital episode "General Hospital's Christmas Carol", actors from the soap opera portray the characters from Dickens novella. Actor Michael Easton portrays Scrooge.
- A Dickens of a Holiday! (2021), a made-for-TV movie produced by the Hallmark Channel and starring Brooke D'Orsay as Cassie, a theatre director working on a community production of A Christmas Carol to celebrate the 100th anniversary of Dickens Day, an annual festival held in the fictional town of Dickens, Ohio.
- Christmas Carole (2022), a made-for-television comedy written by Anil Gupta and Richard Pinto, and starring Suranne Jones as a Scrooge-like entrepreneur named Carole Mackay, with the three ghosts represented by Morecambe and Wise (played by actors Jonty Stephens and Ian Ashpitel), Jo Brand and Nish Kumar.
- Staged (2022); in the episode "Knock, Knock", David and Michael perform an improvised adaptation of A Christmas Carol during a livestream.

=== Animated films ===
==== Theatrical ====
- Mickey's Christmas Carol (1983), an animated theatrical featurette film featuring the various Walt Disney characters with Scrooge McDuck playing the role of Ebenezer Scrooge, Mickey Mouse as Bob Cratchit, Goofy as Jacob Marley, and Donald Duck as Fred.
- Christmas Carol: The Movie (2001), an animated version produced by Illuminated Films (Christmas Carol), Ltd/The Film Consortium/MBP; screenplay by Robert Llewellyn & Piet Kroon; with the voices of Simon Callow, Kate Winslet and Nicolas Cage. Winslet also recorded the song "What If" to promote the film. This film has live action scenes, in which Simon Callow plays Charles Dickens, at the start during the opening credits and at the end prior to the closing credits.
- A Christmas Carol (2009), a motion-capture film directed by Robert Zemeckis, and starring Jim Carrey as Scrooge and the three ghosts. From Walt Disney Pictures and ImageMovers, it was released in November 2009 in Disney Digital 3-D, RealD 3D, and IMAX 3D. This adaptation, while mostly faithful to the novel, includes such scenes as Scrooge being pursued through London and being dropped into his own grave by the Ghost of Christmas Yet To Come.
- Scrooge: A Christmas Carol (2022), an animated musical version and a remake of Scrooge (1970), produced by Timeless Films, directed by Stephen Donnelly, with Screenplay by Donnelly and Leslie Bricusse. It was released on 2 December 2022, on Netflix.

==== Direct to video ====
- A Christmas Carol (1997), an animated production produced by DIC Productions, L.P. featuring the voice of Tim Curry as Scrooge as well as the voices of Whoopi Goldberg, Michael York and Ed Asner.
- An All Dogs Christmas Carol (1998), an animated direct-to-video film and the de facto finale of the All Dogs Go to Heaven franchise; features the villainous Carface (Ernest Borgnine) as Scrooge, with Itchy (Dom DeLuise) as the Ghost of Christmas Past, Sasha (Sheena Easton) as Present, and Charlie (Steven Weber) as Future.
- A Christmas Carol (2002), a bonus feature on the DVD release of Peter Ackroyd's docudrama Dickens, portraying a Christmas dinner at Gads Hill Place where Charles Dickens recites the novella to his family and friends. The author is portrayed by Anton Lesser, reprising his role from the docudrama.
- A Christmas Carol (2006), a computer-animated adaptation featuring anthropomorphic animals in the lead roles.
- Bah, Humduck! A Looney Tunes Christmas (2006), a modern retelling featuring Daffy Duck in the Scrooge role, and Bugs Bunny as the host.
- A Sesame Street Christmas Carol (2006), a direct to DVD special featuring Oscar the Grouch in the Scrooge role.
- Barbie in a Christmas Carol (2008), a retelling starring Barbie as Eden Starling, an opera singer in the role of Scrooge.
- The Smurfs: A Christmas Carol (2011), a direct to DVD imagining of the story, as told by and featuring the Smurfs.
- 2nd Chance for Christmas (2019), a direct to DVD re-imagining, a spoiled pop star (Brittany Underwood) takes the Scrooge role. Featuring Tara Reid, Vivica A. Fox, Jim O'Heir, Mark McGrath and the wrestler Rob Van Dam. Directed by Christopher Ray.
- A Christmas Carol (1991), starring Richard Newman as Scrooge.SABAn

==== Animated television ====
- Mister Magoo's Christmas Carol (1962), an animated musical television special in colour featuring the UPA character voiced by Jim Backus, with songs by Jule Styne and Bob Merrill.
- A Christmas Carol (1969), a 45-minute children's afternoon special directed by Zoran Janjic and produced by Australia's Air Programs and aired in the U.S. on CBS on 13 December 1970. Ron Haddrick voiced Scrooge for the Australian production. It was the first in a series titled Famous Classic Tales and sponsored by Kenner when broadcast.
- A Christmas Carol (1970), directed by John Salway and broadcast on Anglia Television.
- A Christmas Carol (1971), an Oscar-winning animated short film by Richard Williams, with Alastair Sim and Michael Hordern reprising their roles from the 1951 film. This film was also released theatrically.
- The Stingiest Man in Town (1978), a 51-minute animated made-for-TV musical produced by Rankin-Bass based on the 1956 live-action television musical, starring Walter Matthau as the voice of Scrooge and Tom Bosley as the narrator. Scrooge was drawn to physically resemble Matthau.
- Bugs Bunny's Christmas Carol (1979), an animated television special featuring the various Looney Tunes characters, with the role of Scrooge going to Yosemite Sam.
- A Christmas Carol (1982), an Australian made-for-television animated Christmas fantasy film from Burbank Films as part of the studio's series of Charles Dickens adaptations from 1982 to 1985. It was originally broadcast in 1982 through the Australian Nine Network.
- A Flintstones Christmas Carol (1994), an animated television special based on The Flintstones series produced by Hanna-Barbera Productions, featuring the series' characters putting on a play based on the novel.
- An episode of the animated series Pepper Ann, uses the storyline with a focus on Valentine's Day instead.
- The animated series Beavis and Butt-head has an episode titled "Huh-Huh-Humbug", where Beavis dreams of being a Scrooge-like character.

==== Derivative ====
- Gumby "Scrooge Loose" (1957). Gumby plays Sherlock Holmes to find and capture Ebenezer Scrooge, who has escaped out of the book by Charles Dickens and who is bent on ruining Christmas. Scrooge has walked into a book on Santa Claus stories, and he is replacing the presents with rocks on Christmas Eve. It is up to Gumby and Pokey (whom Gumby calls "Dr. Watson") to capture the humbuggish Scrooge and put a stop to his antics.
- Bugs Bunny's Christmas Carol (1979). The cartoon is an adaptation of the Dickens novella, featuring Yosemite Sam as Ebenezer Scrooge, Porky Pig as Bob Cratchit and Bugs Bunny as Jacob Marley and Fred. Scrooge's dream-journey into his past, present, and future is omitted; instead, Bugs dresses up as a white-robed emissary of Hades to scare Scrooge straight.
- The Dukes "A Dickens of a Christmas" (1983). In this episode of the animated version of The Dukes of Hazzard, Boss Hogg has a Scrooge-like experience.
- The Jetsons "A Jetson Christmas Carol" (1985). Spacely as Scrooge orders George, playing the role of Bob Cratchit, to work overtime on Christmas Eve while Astro causes himself to be sick, which makes him the Tiny Tim in the show. Three spirits in the form of robots visit Spacely to convince him that Christmas is a time of giving.
- The Real Ghostbusters "X-Mas Marks the Spot" (1986). On Christmas Eve Peter Venkman, Ray Stanz, Egon Spangler, and Winston Zeddmore end up travelling back in time to 1837 England, where they unknowingly meet Scrooge and end up "busting" the three Christmas ghosts by accident. It is revealed that Peter's childhood was very similar to Scrooge's.
- Beverly Hills Teens "Miracle at The Teenclub parts I & II" (1987). The teens envision themselves as the players in A Christmas Carol allegory while snowbound during Buck Huckster's Christmas Eve Party
- Bravestarr "Tex's Terrible Night" (1987). The series' villain, Tex Hex, fills the Scrooge role while the Shaman helps him to see the error of his ways, temporarily.
- Camp Candy "Christmas in July" (1989). During a summer heat wave, the Camp Candy gang cools things off by staging a make-believe "Christmas in July." But when crabby Vanessa says "Bah humbug!" to their plan, the campers teach her about true holiday spirit with a goofy Camp Candy version of A Christmas Carol.
- The Chipmunks "Merry Christmas, Mr. Carroll" (1989). Alvin is Scrooge-like and experiences the three spirits.
- Animaniacs "A Christmas Plotz" (1993). A Warner version of A Christmas Carol, with the Warners as the three spirits, Slappy Squirrel as Jacob Marley and Thaddeus Plotz as Ebenezer Scrooge.
- Avenger Penguins "A Christmas Carol" (1994). The novella is parodied in this episode: Doom realises he must restore power to the city after he blacks it out.
- 101 Dalmatians: The Series "A Christmas Cruella" (1997). An adaptation with Cruella in the role of Scrooge, Anita Dearly as Bob Cratchit, Lucky in the role of Tiny Tim, Jasper and Horace as Marley, Cadpig as the ghost of Christmas Past, Rolly as the ghost of Christmas Present, and Spot as the ghost of Christmas Yet To Come.
- An All Dogs Christmas Carol (1998). Animated TV movie based on All Dogs Go to Heaven and featuring the villainous Carface as Scrooge.
- Arthur "Prunella Gets It Twice" (1999). Prunella gets two dolls for her birthday and dismisses the second one, which is from Francine. Later, Prunella believes that Francine spoiled the party by not joining in on the festivities. That night, Prunella has a dream where the Ghost of Presents Past takes her through time to clear things up, showing her how far Francine went to get the doll. In the end, Prunella realises that Francine's attitude was caused by Prunella's lack of appreciation for the present.
- Adventures from the Book of Virtues (2000). An adaptation with Annie in the role of Scrooge, Zack in the role of Bob Cratchit, Plato in the role of Jacob Marley, Aristotle in the role of the Ghost of Christmas Past, Socrates in the role of the Ghost of Christmas Present, Aurora in the role of the Ghost of Christmas Yet to Come, and an unnamed blond orphan boy in the role of Tiny Tim.
- Maxine's Christmas Carol (2000). In this modernised (Y2K), animated adaptation, Hallmark Card comic character Maxine is Scrooge.
- Pepper Ann "A Valentine's Day Tune" (2000). In this Valentine's Day spin, Pepper Ann is visited by the ghosts of her past, present, and future to see why she hates Valentine's Day, what others think about her hatred of the holiday, and what will happen if she does not change her ways.
- Aqua Teen Hunger Force "Cybernetic Ghost of Christmas Past from the Future" (2002) starts out as a parody, with the eponymous time-travelling cybernetic spectre showing Carl a Christmas Day from his childhood, before the memory is interrupted by a robot war (which he does not remember because back then it was only a prophecy)
- The Simpsons "'Tis the Fifteenth Season" (2003). After watching Mr. McGrew's Christmas Carol, Homer mends his selfish ways and becomes the nicest guy in town, making Ned Flanders jealous.
- Veggie Tales: "An Easter Carol" (2004). A direct-to-video adaptation which is similar, but is themed around Easter instead of Christmas.
- A Christmas Carol: Scrooge's Ghostly Tale (2006), animated. This version casts the famous Dickens characters as anthropomorphic animals.
- American Dad! "The Best Christmas Story Never Told" (2006). With Stan's Christmas spirit at an all-time low (thanks to special interest groups trying to make the holiday season more politically correct), the Ghost of Christmas Past visits him and tries to show him the true meaning of Christmas by taking him to 1970. However, Stan is convinced that Christmas can be saved by killing Jane Fonda.
- Bah, Humduck! A Looney Tunes Christmas (2006). The second Looney Tunes adaptation, this time in modern times, featuring Daffy Duck as Scrooge.
- Kappa Mikey "A Christmas Mikey" (2006). Ozu fills the Scrooge role and is visited by the Ghosts of Japanese Christmas. In this case, Ozu is only shown his past, and when the Present Ghost shows up, the Past Ghost explains Ozu's sad backstory and the three decide to ruin Christmas until the Future Ghost appears and sets them straight.
- Wayside "Wayside Christmas" (2007). When Myron does not give Bebe a Secret Santa gift, a series of haphazard events confuse Myron into thinking he is actually stuck in his own version of A Christmas Carol. The other kids, including Todd, Dana and Maurecia, are baffled as he mistakes them for Ghosts of Christmas Past, Present, and Future, and in the end, Myron learns his lesson.
- Barbie in a Christmas Carol (2008). Barbie stars as a female version of Scrooge.
- The High Fructose Adventures of Annoying Orange "Orange Carol" (2012). Orange's annoying antics are spoiling everyone's holiday cheer, then a visit from three ghosts appeared and try to make Orange learn about the holiday spirit.
- The Looney Tunes Show "A Christmas Carol" (2012). The episode features a stage adaptation of the tale written by Lola, only without going by the book due to the character of Scrooge. It is unclear if she had read the book Bugs gave her or not.
- Jake and the Never Land Pirates "Captain Scrooge" (2014). Captain Treasure Tooth visits Captain Scrooge (Captain Hook) and takes him through time.
- Thomas & Friends "Diesel's Ghostly Christmas" (2015). A special double-length episode from Series 19; a loose adaptation of the story with Diesel playing the role of Scrooge.
- My Little Pony: Friendship Is Magic A Hearth's Warming Tail (2016). During the annual celebration of Hearth's Warming (the Equestrian version of Christmas), Twilight Sparkle tells Starlight Glimmer a story to get her into the spirit of the season. The story features Snowfall Frost (portrayed by Starlight Glimmer) as the story's version of Scrooge.
- Be Cool, Scooby-Doo! "Scroogey Doo" (2017). The gang travels to nineteenth-century Britain and runs into Scrooge who claims he was attacked by the ghost of his partner Jacob Marley and that three more ghosts are coming. The gang agrees to solve the mystery, but Velma wonders if she has more potential than just solving mysteries.
- Family Guy "Don't Be A Dickens at Christmas" (2017). Peter takes a journey around Quahog with the ghost of Patrick Swayze after he loses his Christmas spirit.
- The Powerpuff Girls "You're A Good Man, Mojo Jojo!" (2017). After terrorising Townsville during the holidays, Mojo Jojo is visited that night by three ghosts resembling the Powerpuff Girls, who try to make him change his ways.
- Ducktales "Last Christmas!" (2018). With David Tennant as Scrooge McDuck.
- The Loud House "A Flipmas Carol" (2020). A Scrooge-like Flip is visited by three ghosts.

== Audio media productions ==
=== Radio ===
==== 1923–1999 ====
- On 19 December 1923 BBC Radio broadcast an adaptation of the story by R. E. Jeffrey.
- Lionel Barrymore starred as Scrooge in a dramatisation on the CBS Radio Network on 25 December 1934, beginning a tradition he would repeat on various network programs every Christmas through 1953. Only twice did he not play the role: in 1936, when his brother John Barrymore filled in because of the death of Lionel's wife, and again in 1938, when Orson Welles took over the role because Barrymore had fallen ill.
- A 1940s adaptation starring Basil Rathbone as Scrooge was subsequently issued as a three-record set by Columbia Records.
- On 24 December 1949, Favorite Story broadcast an adaptation with Ronald Colman both hosting and starring as Scrooge. This version used a script nearly identical to the one used in Colman's famous 1941 record album of the story, but a different supporting cast.
- On 24 December 1949, Richard Diamond, Private Detective adapted the story with characters from the series playing the Dickens characters in the style of the radio series and transplanting the story to New York City, with Dick Powell in character as "Richard Diamond" narrating the story.
- On 20 December 1953, The Six Shooter broadcast "Britt Ponset's Christmas Carol", in which the title character Britt Ponset tells a young boy who is running away from home a western version of A Christmas Carol, with Howard McNear playing the role of Eben (the Scrooge character).
- On 25 December 1965, the BBC aired an hour-long radio version adapted by Charles Lefeaux with music composed and conducted by Christopher Whelen, and starring Ralph Richardson as both The Storyteller and Scrooge.
- On 24 December 1973 and every year until 1987 WNBC-AM in New York City broadcast an adaptation featuring prominent on-air staff Don Imus as Ebenezer Scrooge, Big Wilson as the Ghost of Christmas Past, Wolfman Jack as the Ghost of Christmas Present, Pat Whitley as the Ghost of Christmas Future, Murray The K as Bob Cratchit, Gordon Hammet as Jacob Marley and Donna Patrone as Tiny Tim.
- In 1975, CBS Radio Mystery Theatre ran A Christmas Carol starring E. G. Marshall as Scrooge. This is the only episode in which Marshall appeared in a role other than host.
- Another BBC Radio production, broadcast on BBC Radio 4 on 22 December 1990, starred Michael Gough as Scrooge and Freddie Jones as The Narrator. This production was subsequently re-broadcast on BBC Radio 7 and later on BBC Radio 4 Extra.
- In 1995, Quicksilver Radio Theater broadcast a dramatisation directed by Jay Stern and starring Craig Wichman as Scrooge, Anthony Cinelli, John Prave, Ghislaine Nichols, Deborah Barta, Joseph Franchini, Jodi Botelho, Elizabeth Stull and Tony Scheinman. The production was originally aired on Max Schmid's The Golden Age of Radio on WBAI, New York, NY on Christmas Eve 1995 and repeated Christmas Day 1995, and is currently syndicated on National Public Radio. The program is currently part of the Theater Collection at the Paley Center for Media in New York.

==== 2000–present ====
- In 2008, David Jason recorded a 10 part abridged reading for BBC Radio 4's Book at Bedtime.
- On 20 December 2014, BBC Radio 4 broadcast a new production adapted by Neil Brand for actors, the BBC Singers and the BBC Symphony Orchestra, recorded before an audience in the BBC Maida Vale Studios and directed by David Hunter. The cast included Robert Powell as Scrooge, Ron Cook as Marley and Tracy-Ann Oberman as Mrs. Fezziwig.
- On 18 December 2015, Kathleen Turner starred as Scrooge in a live performance presented as a radio drama at the Greene Space in New York City; a recording of the performance was broadcast on WNYC on 24 and 25 December 2015. Previous broadcasts at the Greene Space featured F. Murray Abraham (2011), Brian Cox (2012), Tony Roberts (2013) and Mark-Linn Baker (2014) in the role of Scrooge.

=== Recordings ===
==== 1941–1999 ====
- In 1941, Ronald Colman portrayed Scrooge in an American Decca four-record 78-RPM album of A Christmas Carol with a full supporting cast of radio actors and a score by Victor Young. This version was eventually transferred to LP and in 2005 appeared on a Deutsche Grammophon compact disc, along with its companion piece on LP, Mr. Pickwick's Christmas, narrated by Charles Laughton. (The Pickwick recording had originally been made in 1944.) The Ronald Colman A Christmas Carol is slightly abbreviated on both the LP and the CD versions; on the LP, this was done to fit the entire production onto one side of a 12-inch 33 RPM record. With the greater time available it was hoped that the CD would have the complete recording, but Deutsche Grammophon used the shorter LP version.
- Also in 1941, Ernest Chappell narrated A Christmas Carol, "dramatized to a musical background," on an album of four 12-inch records for RCA Victor.
- In 1960, Dan O'Herlihy recorded the complete Dickens novel on a set of 4 16-RPM LP's, one of the few instances that this speed was used for a professional recording. This version was one of the first audiobooks ever made and is now available on CD. It was originally released on LP by a company called Audio Book Records, perhaps the first use of that term ever coined.
- An Adaptation of Dickens' Christmas Carol (1974) is an audio musical recording with six original musical numbers, featuring various Disney characters playing the Dickens roles. It was adapted (without the songs) into the animated short Mickey's Christmas Carol in 1983.
- An adaptation of "A Christmas Carol" was produced by British film directors Leon Mitchell and Peter Darnes in 2026. The audiobook production was released to major streaming platforms and broadcast on BBC Radio Lincolnshire. The adaptation featured a more modern musical soundscape that was an infusion of both classic Christmas music and a contemporary sound.

==== 2000–present ====
- Christine Baranski performed as Narrator in a 2025 recording of the Skylark Ensemble's performance of A Christmas Carol and has repeated her performance in subsequent live performances with the ensemble.

== Parody adaptations ==
=== 1978–1999 ===
- Rich Little's Christmas Carol (1978) Premiered on CBC with Rich Little playing each celebrity character.
- Kenny Everett's Christmas Carol (1985), a Christmas special episode of his BBC series with many famous cameos.
- Blackadder's Christmas Carol (1988), in which the central character, Ebenezer Blackadder (Rowan Atkinson), is initially kind and generous, but after being visited by the Spirit of Christmas (Robbie Coltrane), becomes greedy, insulting and mean.
- Beavis and Butt-head, (1995) "Huh-Huh-Humbug", an episode with Beavis as Scrooge.

=== 2000–2009 ===
- Karroll's Christmas (2004), The Scrooge character, Zebidiah Rosecog (Wallace Shawn) is the neighbour of Allen Karroll (Tom Everett Scott), who is visited by the three ghosts instead due to a mistake in address.
- An American Carol (2008), Presented from a conservative-leaning perspective, the film is a parody of liberal filmmaker Michael Moore as well as his editorial documentaries that satirise Hollywood and American culture. It uses the framework of A Christmas Carol, but moves the setting of the story from Christmas to US Independence Day.

=== 2010–present ===
- All American Christmas Carol (2013), An impoverished mother is visited by three ghosts intent on showing her a path to a brighter future. Starring Taryn Manning, Beverly D'Angelo, Wendi McLendon-Covey, Meat Loaf, Eric Roberts, and Lin Shaye.
- A Christmas Boner in 2013 by Conor Lastowka, a rewrite of A Christmas Carol in which Scrooge has priapism throughout. This was in the vein of other parody mashups like Pride and Prejudice and Zombies.
- A Christmas Carol Goes Wrong (2017), a BBC One television special written by and starring Henry Lewis, Jonathan Sayer and Henry Shields and Mischief Theatre Company in which the fictional Cornley Polytechnic Drama Society disastrously attempts to perform a TV adaptation of the story. A follow up to their 2016 special Peter Pan Goes Wrong. Derek Jacobi and Diana Rigg also star.
- Q Brothers Christmas Carol (2018), a hip-hop parody of Christmas Carol, produced by the Q Brothers (JQ and GQ), performed at the Chicago Shakespeare Theater.
- A Christmas Karen (2022), a comedy based on the internet meme.

== Derivative works ==
The basic plot of A Christmas Carol has been put to a variety of different literary and dramatic uses since Dickens's death, alongside sequels, prequels, and stories focusing on minor characters.

=== Derivative radio adaptations ===
- On 24 December 1959, The BBC Home Service broadcast the first episode of series 10 of The Goon Show, titled "A Christmas Carol", starring Spike Milligan, Peter Sellers and Harry Secombe.
- On 9 April 1980, the Mutual Radio Theater broadcast a radio play entitled "The Last of Scrooge", starring Vincent Price as the Narrator and Hans Conried as Scrooge, relating the events occurring after Scrooge's reformation that eventually brought the old man to an unhappy and miserable end.
- Marley Was Dead (2010), a comedy written by John Nicholson and Richard Katz and broadcast on BBC Radio 4. When a live broadcast of A Christmas Carol is interrupted by eggnog spilling onto the studio equipment, the skeletal team in the BBC's continuity department improvise their own production of the story with help from Jonathan Dimbleby, Dara Ó Briain, Jane Horrocks, Edward Kelsey, Charlotte Green and Peter Purves.
- Scrooge Blues (2016) was written by Nicholas McInerny and broadcast on BBC Radio 4 in December 2002 and re-broadcast on BBC Radio 7 on 28 December 2010. This continuation, starring David Hargreaves, takes place one year after the events of A Christmas Carol after the transformation of Ebenezer Scrooge.

=== Derivative music adaptations ===
- "Ebenezer Scrooge" (1953), a novelty song performed by Teresa Brewer based on the novella.
- "Jacob Marley's Chains" (1993), a song by Aimee Mann inspired by the character of Jacob Marley. The song features on her album Whatever.
- "The Ghost of Christmas Past" (2016), a song by Elizabeth Chan using the Ghost of Christmas Past as an allegory for bereavement.
- A Christmas Carol: A Folk Opera (2017), a concept album by folk band Green Matthews that retells the story by putting new lyrics to well-known carols and traditional tunes A concert version of the album was toured around the UK the following year.
- A Christmas Carol (2020), a concept album by metal band Majestica that retells the story using remixes of classic Christmas carols, such as "Tis the Season to Be Jolly", "Jingle Bells", and"Carol of the Bells".
- "Ghost of Christmas Past" (2020), a song performed by Brina Kay inspired by the character of the same name.

=== Derivative online productions ===
- A Dark Shadows Christmas Carol (2021), a production of Campbell Playhouse's adaptation performed over Zoom by the cast of soap opera Dark Shadows.

=== Derivative literature ===
==== 2000–2010 ====
- Mr. Timothy (HarperCollins, 2003) by Louis Bayard. Here again is an adult Tiny Tim, only this time as a 23-year-old resident of a London brothel who becomes embroiled in a murder mystery. Mr. Timothy was included in The New York Times's list of Notable Fiction for 2003.
- Starring Tracy Beaker (2006), a children's book by Jacqueline Wilson that revolves around Tracy's involvement in a school production of A Christmas Carol
- Mr Men: A Christmas Carol by Adam Hargreaves (2007), a children's book in the Mr. Men series retelling the story with Mr. Mean in the Scrooge role.

==== 2011–2019 ====
- Jacob – A Denouement in One Act (2017), a story set roughly 80 years after the original where Jacob Marley, having played all three ghosts with no idea if his visit was successful, learns of the positive effects he had on Scrooge and London as a whole that may free him of his chains.
- Marley (2017), a serialised web novella focusing on Jacob Marley in the days before A Christmas Carol, primarily his life and how he came to redeem Ebenezer. It also shows the background of the three Ghosts and features action sequences as someone Marley knew in life, and spurned, steals the Ghost of Christmas Present's torch in an effort to permanently stop the dead visiting the living.

==== 2020–present ====
- A Christmasaurus Carol (2023), an instalment in the Christmasaurus book series by Tom Fletcher. William and the Christmasaurus discover a magical copy of A Christmas Carol at a mysterious library. Ebenezer Scrooge escapes from the book and tries to humbug Christmas. So it's down to the Christmasaurus, William, Santa and all of the Christmasaurus gang to try and get Scrooge back into the copy of his book.

== Video game adaptations ==
- Ebenezer and the Invisible World (2023) – A Metroidvania 2D platformer, the game takes place immediately after the events of the novella and focuses on Scrooge in his efforts to take down Caspar Malthus, a wealthy industrialist's heir who was similarly visited one year prior by the three spirits.

== Podcasts ==
- Three Ghosts (2020), book and music by C.E. Simon, Lyrics by Liz Muller. Three Ghosts is a retelling of A Christmas Carol, with a cast of over 40 people from all over the world, released on 19 December 2020.
- Scrooge: A Christmas Carol (2023), an audio adaptation produced by Compassion International and Hope Media Group. The cast featured Sean Astin as Scrooge, Maxwell Caulfield as Marley, Ryan O'Quinn as Bob Cratchit, Lucy Punch as The Ghost of Christmas Past, Ben Barnes as The Ghost of Christmas Present, Juliet Mills as The Ghost of Christmas Future, Clive Standen as Fred, Bethany Joy Lenz as Elizabeth (a character based on Belle), and John Rhys-Davies as The Narrator.

== See also ==
- List of Christmas films
- List of ghost films

== Bibliography ==
- Fred Guida, A Christmas Carol and Its Adaptations: Dickens's Story on Screen and Television, McFarland & Company, 2000. ISBN 0-7864-0738-7.
