= Scrooge (musical) =

1992 stage musical

- The Musical
- Music: Leslie Bricusse
- Lyrics: Leslie Bricusse
- Book: Leslie Bricusse
- Basis: 1970 film by Leslie Bricusse & A Christmas Carol by Charles Dickens
- Premiere: 9 November 1992: The Alexandra, Birmingham
- Productions: 1992 Birmingham; 1993 Melbourne; 1994 Tokyo; 1995 Manchester; 1996 West End; 2003-14 UK and Ireland tour 2004 Chicago; 2005 West End revival 2012 West End revival 2013 Tokyo revival 2017 Leicester revival 2017 Hong Kong

Scrooge: The Musical is a 1992 stage musical with book, music and lyrics by Leslie Bricusse. Its score and book are closely adapted from the music and screenplay of the 1970 musical film Scrooge starring Albert Finney and Charles Dickens' 1843 novella A Christmas Carol. Bricusse was nominated for an Academy Award for the song score he wrote for the film, and most of those songs were carried over to the musical.

== Synopsis ==
=== Act One ===
The musical opens with the company singing a Christmas carol medley as the city of London begins to reminisce over the coming of Christmas ("Sing A Christmas Carol"). Meanwhile, Scrooge and his clerk Bob Cratchit are visited by Scrooge's nephew Harry, who, in contrast to his uncle, is excited for Christmas and deplores how Scrooge is keeping Cratchit working at 7pm on Christmas Eve. Scrooge asks him to leave. After work, Bob Cratchit, his disabled son Tiny Tim and his daughter Kathy go Christmas shopping on the streets of London ("Christmas Children"). Later, Scrooge walks around London, demanding the money that is owed to him by the businesspeople of London, and we learn of Scrooge's negative reputation throughout the people of London, especially soup caterer Tom Jenkins, who leads the angry crowd in despising Scrooge ("Father Christmas"/"I Hate People").

Scrooge is visited by the ghost of Jacob Marley, his business partner who has been dead for seven years, who tells Scrooge to ("Make The Most Of This World") or else the afterlife will be bad for him. He informs Scrooge that he is to be visited by three spirits at 1am, 2am and 3am respectively. Marley also explains the significance of a chain he is wearing: the chain has been built up of sins in life. As Marley leaves, Scrooge is angry at the thought that he is in the wrong for hating Christmas ("It's Not My Fault").

He is visited by the first spirit — the Ghost of Christmas Past — who takes Scrooge back to when he was a small boy who preferred not to take part in Christmas activities and carols ("Sing a Christmas Carol (Reprise)"). The child Ebenezer is visited by his sister Jenny, who takes Ebenezer back home, although he is reluctant to go home to his father due to a troubled relationship. Scrooge is confused as to why the visions are not communicating with him, to which the ghost replies that these are shadows of the things that have been. Scrooge is then taken forward to his teenage years, to a party held by his then boss, Mr Fezziwig ("December the 25th"). Scrooge reminisces about his relationship with Fezziwig's daughter, Isabel ("Happiness"), but we learn that she eventually leaves Scrooge as she feels their love has been negated by his desire for wealth. Scrooge and Young Ebenezer reflect on the situation ("You...You"). The Ghost of Christmas Past reveals to Scrooge that she is the ghost of his sister Jenny, who died young. She tells a heartbroken Scrooge to ("Love While You Can") before leaving him in a state of anguish ("It's Not My Fault (Reprise)").

As the bell tolls 2, Scrooge is visited by the next ghost, the Ghost of Christmas Present. He tells Scrooge that he is part of a group of brothers who, each year, send one down to Earth to spread the joy of Christmas — and this year it is his turn. He is appalled by Scrooge and teaches him to find the joy in living ("I Like Life").

=== Act Two ===
Scrooge is taken by the Ghost of Christmas Present to Bob Cratchit and his family, who are preparing for Christmas ("Good Times") and listening to Tiny Tim sing ("The Beautiful Day"), while Scrooge wonders if the ill Tiny Tim will survive. Scrooge is then taken to his nephew Harry's Christmas party, where he learns that a tradition at the party has become to drink to the health of Scrooge, as well as playing a singing game called ("The Minister's Cat"). Because the song was often sung at Fezziwig's parties, Scrooge is again reminded of his failed relationship with Isabel ("Happiness (Reprise)"). As the Ghost of Christmas Present leaves, Scrooge wonders if he can truly find ("A Better Life") to live.

Finally, Scrooge is visited by the mute Ghost of Christmas Yet to Come, who silently communicates by pointing in the direction he wants Scrooge to travel. First, they visit Tom Jenkins and a chorus of people who owed Scrooge money, who are all singing about an unusually generous thing that Scrooge has done that has made them all thankful to him. Unbeknown to Scrooge, they are actually celebrating his death, yet Scrooge is oblivious ("Thank You Very Much"). The uplifted Scrooge is now taken to the Cratchit household, which is sitting in silence, with the absence of Bob Cratchit and Tiny Tim. The ghost takes Scrooge to a graveyard, where Bob is mourning the death of Tiny Tim and reciting the song he had sung the Christmas before ("The Beautiful Day (Reprise)"). It is then revealed that Scrooge is buried in the same graveyard, and Scrooge realises his own imminent demise with shock. He is visited again by Jacob Marley, who reveals that Scrooge has gone to Hell, and Lucifer has appointed Scrooge as his personal assistant, before revealing Scrooge's chain, which was so big that it was not immediately ready for his arrival in Hell. Scrooge is mortified as he is dragged away by demons.

To his shock, Scrooge wakes up in his bedroom on Christmas Day — still alive and not in Hell. He is grateful and vows to change his ways in the time he has left ("I'll Begin Again"). He begins going around London, forgiving people of their debts and giving out Christmas presents while dressed up as Father Christmas. Everyone in London who was previously against Scrooge is now massively grateful to him for changing his ways ("Finale"). Scrooge reinstates his vow to celebrate Christmas and be kind to people ("I'll Begin Again (Reprise)") before a reprise of "Thank You Very Much" is sung during the bows ("Curtain Call"/"Thank You Very Much (Reprise)").

== Productions ==
=== Original UK and West End production (1992-97) ===
The original producer Graham Mulvein and Leslie Bricusse spent several months with the director Bob Tomson adapting the screenplay for the stage. Mulvein recommended appointing Musical Supervisor, Stuart Pedlar; designer, Paul Farnsworth; and Lighting Designer, Hugh Vanstone, to the team and established a Victorian theatre style for all the locations, illusions and characters. Initially the ghost illusions were entrusted to Paul Daniels, but he was replaced after the first production with Paul Kieve.

The original production starred Anthony Newley as Scrooge and opened on 9 November 1992 at the Alexandra Theatre in Birmingham. The cast also included Stratford Johns, Tom Watt and Jon Pertwee. The production played the following year with the same cast at the Theatre Royal, Plymouth from 30 November to 11 December 1993. The production later transferred to the West End, Tomson having been replaced by director/choreographer Tudor Davies, starring Newley, at the Dominion Theatre from 12 November 1996 to 1 February 1997.

=== Further UK productions ===
Bill Kenwright produced a revival of the original production which toured the UK and Ireland for the Christmas seasons between 2003 and 2013 starring Tommy Steele in the title role (with the exceptions of Shane Richie in the 2005 and 2007 tours and Michael Barrymore in the 2006 tour. The show was on hiatus for the 2008 Christmas season). The production transferred into the West End starring Steele for the 2005 (while Richie toured an identical production) and 2012 Christmas seasons at the London Palladium, making Steele the record-holder for the most performances headlined at the Palladium.

A revival was produced at the Curve Theatre in Leicester from 18 November 2017 to 14 January 2018, directed by Curve artistic director Nikolai Foster for the musical's 25th anniversary. It starred Jasper Britton as Scrooge.

Another revival, directed by Thom Southerland will be presented at the SEC Armadillo in Glasgow, starring Marti Pellow as Scrooge from 12 December 2026 to 10 January 2027.

=== Australian production ===
After premiering in Birmingham, Producer, Graham Mulvein co-produced the original UK production in Australia, with Producer, David Mariner, featuring Keith Michell, Max Gillies, Tony Taylor and William Zappa, ran from November 1993 to January 1994 at the Princess Theatre in Melbourne.

=== U.S. productions ===
The American premiere opened on 26 October 2004 at the Ford Center for the Performing Arts Oriental Theatre in Chicago. This production was produced by Bill Kenwright and starred Richard Chamberlain in the title role.

It has also been performed by the Spring Lake Theatre Company in Spring Lake, New Jersey, every Christmas season since 1982. Mark E. Fleming originated the production at Spring Lake and has staged the production at the Premier Theatre Co since its founding in 1987. In 2022, the Spring Lake Theatre presented its 40th anniversary production.

Another production of the show has been performed since 1982 by The Players Of Utica, located in Utica, New York. Director Peter Loftus has been the only director for the show during the entire run, which celebrated its 30th year in 2012. The production has become an annual community event during the holidays, in terms of both audiences and casts. The 2012 cast was one of the largest of its 30-year run, with over 250 members. The show regularly does a community performance for local schools and senior programs. Turnout for this annual performance has exceeded 1,500 students from area schools.

In Longmont, Colorado, "Scrooge!" has been performed annually since 1987 at Jesters Dinner Theater. Notably, the role of Scrooge played by Scott Moore at every performance.

=== Japanese production ===
In 1994, Mulvein co-produced the Japanese premiere with Himawari Theatre Group of Japan. The production played that year in Tokyo and Kobe. Himawari Theatre Group produced the performance from 1994 to 1999, and was taken over by HORIPRO from the 2013 production. Japanese actor, Masachika Ichimura has played the starring role “Scrooge” seven times from the 1994 Japanese premiere to the most recent in 2022.

== Characters ==
Adults (in order of appearance)

- Scrooge
- Bob Cratchit
- Harry (Scrooge's nephew)
- Bess
- Wine Merchant
- Mrs. Dilber
- Miss Dilber
- Bisset the Butcher
- Punch and Judy Man
- Beggar Woman
- Mr. Pringle
- Tom Jenkins
- Jocelyn Jollygoode
- Hugo Hearty
- Chesnut Seller
- Jacob Marley
- Phantoms
- Ghost of Christmas Past
- School Teacher
- Mr. Fezziwig
- Young Ebenezer
- Dick Wilkins
- Mrs Fezziwig
- Isabel
- Ghost of Christmas Present
- Mrs. Ethel Cratchit
- Helen
- Topper
- Mary
- Ghost of Christmas Yet to Come
- Mrs. Pringle

Children

- Tiny Tim
- Kathy Cratchit
- Peter Cratchit
- Belinda Cratchit
- Martha Cratchit
- Freddy/Ebby
- Georgina/Jenny
- Henrietta
- Nell/Maid
- Poppy
- Oscar
- Laurie
- Jack
- Isaac
- Maggie
- Kitty

== Musical numbers ==
Act I

- "Sing a Christmas Carol" – Company
- "M.O.N.E.Y" – Scrooge
- "Christmas Children" – Bob Cratchit, Tiny Tim, Kathy Cratchit and Company
- "Father Christmas" – Tom Jenkins and Company
- "I Hate People" – Scrooge and Company
- "Make the Most of this World" – Jacob Marley and Phantoms
- "It's Not my Fault!" – Scrooge
- "Sing A Christmas Carol" (Reprise) – Scrooge and Children
- "December the Twenty-Fifth" – Fezziwigs and Company
- "Happiness" – Ebenezer, Isabel, Scrooge and Christmas Past
- "You...You" – Scrooge and Young Ebenezer
- "Love While You Can" – Christmas Past
- "It's Not My Fault" (Reprise) – Scrooge
- "I Like Life" – Christmas Present, Scrooge and Company

Act II

- "The Milk of Human Kindness" – Scrooge and Company
- "Good Times" - Cratchits
- "The Beautiful Day" – Tiny Tim and Cratchits
- "The Minister's Cat" – Company
- "Happiness" (Reprise) – Scrooge
- "A Better Life" – Scrooge
- "Thank You Very Much" – Scrooge, Tom Jenkins and Company
- "The Beautiful Day" (Reprise) – Tiny Tim and Bob Cratchit
- "I'll Begin Again" – Scrooge
- "Finale" – Scrooge and Company
- "I'll Begin Again" (Reprise) – Scrooge and Company
- "Curtain Calls" – Company
- "Thank You Very Much" (Reprise) – Company

=== Cast recordings ===
The original London cast recording featuring Anthony Newley as Scrooge was released by JAY Productions Ltd on 14 October 1997 and is currently available to purchase on iTunes. A second cast recording of the 2005 London Palladium production with Tommy Steele was also released by Bill Kenwright Records and was available to purchase in the theatre foyers, however it is currently not available to purchase or download.

On 21 January 1995, BBC Radio 2 broadcast the complete musical live from the Palace Theatre in Manchester. The production was directed by Tudor Davies, with Anthony Newley as "Scrooge", Stratford Johns as "Ghost of Christmas Present", Barry Howard as "Jacob Marley", Felicity Soper as "Ghost of Christmas Past", Paul Robinson as "Tom Jenkins" and David Howe as "Bob Cratchit".

== See also ==
- Adaptations of A Christmas Carol
