= Rich Little's Christmas Carol =

- Artwork for Rich Little's Christmas Carol on HBO
- Also known as: A Christmas Carol
- Starring: Rich Little
- Country of origin: Canada

Production
- Running time: 55 minutes
- Production company: CBC Television

Original release
- Network: CBC Television, HBO
- Release: December 1978

Rich Little's Christmas Carol, broadcast in Canada as A Christmas Carol, is a TV special that premiered on CBC Television in December 1978, and in the United States on Home Box Office (HBO) on December 16, 1979. The special won an International Emmy Award and a Rose d'Or award. It was produced by the Canadian Broadcasting Corporation in 1978. It starred Rich Little in a one-man performance with impersonations of his characters playing the parts in Charles Dickens' famous 1843 holiday story, A Christmas Carol. Little played the following celebrities:

- W. C. Fields as Ebenezer Scrooge
- Paul Lynde as Bob Cratchit
- Johnny Carson as Fred
- Laurel and Hardy as the two solicitors
- Richard Nixon as Jacob Marley
- Humphrey Bogart as the Ghost of Christmas Past
- Groucho Marx as Fezziwig
- James Stewart as Dick Wilkins
- Peter Falk as Columbo/the Ghost of Christmas Present
- Jean Stapleton as Edith Bunker/Mrs. Cratchit
- Truman Capote as Tiny Tim
- Peter Sellers as Inspector Clouseau/the Ghost of Christmas Yet to Come
- James Mason, George Burns and John Wayne as the three businessmen
- Jack Benny as a boy

The show was shot on videotape and included a laugh track.

In 1963, Little released the LP "Scrooge and the Stars", which may have been the inspiration for this version of A Christmas Carol. On the LP, Little portrayed Scrooge as Jack Benny.

== See also ==
- List of A Christmas Carol adaptations
- List of Christmas films
