= Daniel and the Devil =

1888 short story by Eugene Field

"Daniel and the Devil" is an 1888 short story by the American journalist and poet Eugene Field. Similar in subject matter and setting to other American "pact with the Devil" or Faust stories, such as "Young Goodman Brown" by Nathaniel Hawthorne and Washington Irving's "The Devil and Tom Walker," Field's story varies significantly in allowing the Faust character (Daniel) to escape from the bargain.

== Summary ==
In the story, Daniel, an unprosperous businessman and father of nine, resolves to sell his soul to the Devil in order to escape his miserable existence. When confronted with Beelzebub, a major demon, Daniel notes that his business experience has taught him only to deal with the owner. The Devil then appears and requires that Daniel sign a contract stipulating that the Devil will exchange twenty-four years of service for Daniel's soul. Contrary to the traditional Faust stories, Daniel insists that the devil sign a bond indicating that should he ever fail to do what Daniel requires, Daniel would be freed from his contract and that 1,001 souls would be released from Hell. The first years of the contract proceed well, although the Devil is disappointed when Daniel asks only for decidedly decent things. Eventually, Daniel requires the Devil to build an imposing church, see to the election of honest politicians, and ensure that honest judges fill the bench. The Devil initially resists these duties, but, faced with the bond, he relents. Eventually the Devil abandons the bond when asked to make sure all the saloons are kept closed on Sunday. Although not nearly as well known, Field's story, in its humor and its "happy" ending, provided inspiration for the later "The Devil and Daniel Webster" by Stephen Vincent Benét.
