= Elena Passarello =

American writer, actor, and professor

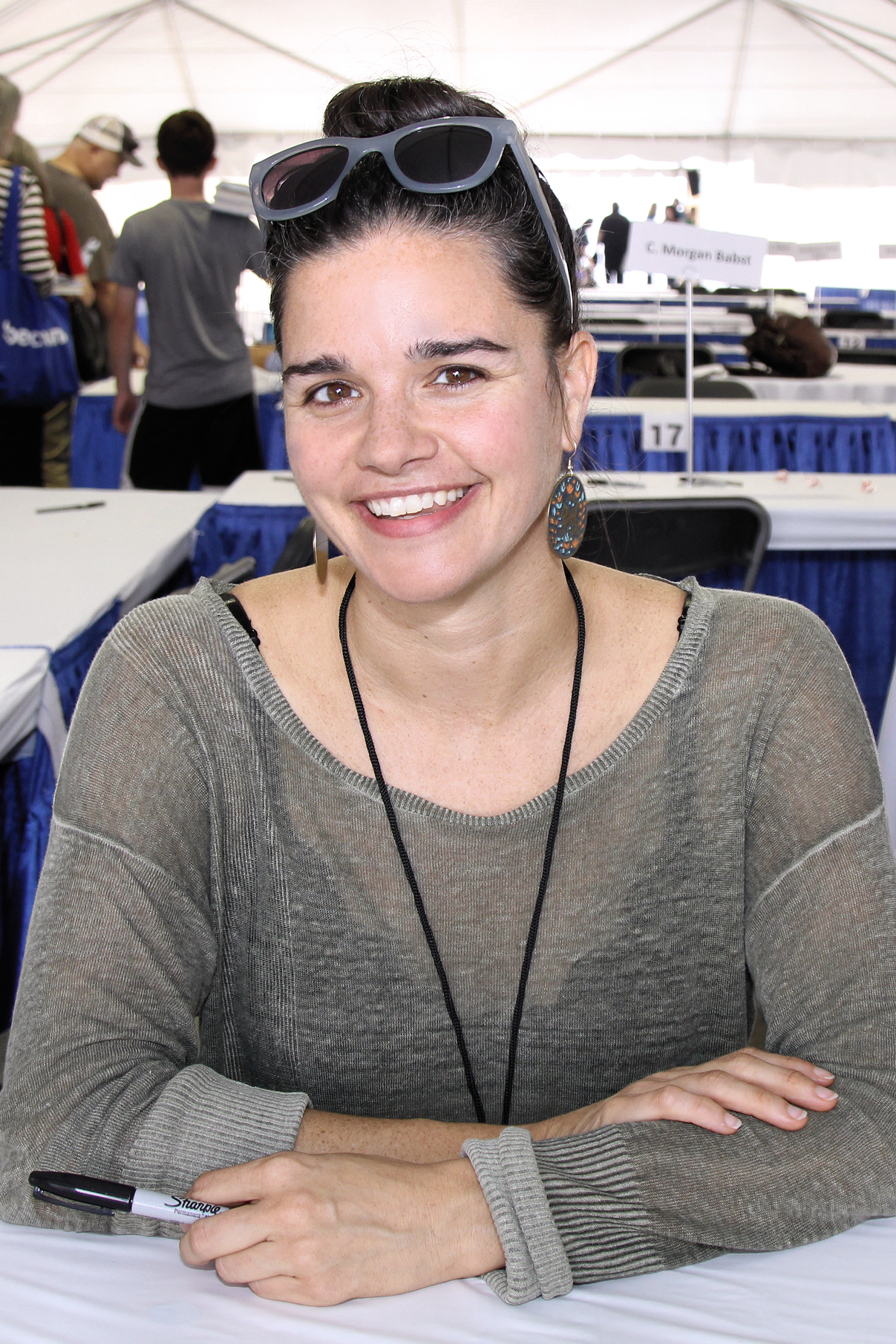
- Passarello at the 2017 Texas Book Festival.
- Born: Charleston, South Carolina, US
- Education: University of Pittsburgh; University of Iowa Nonfiction Writing Program
- Occupations: Writer, actor, teacher
- Spouse: David Turkel
- Writing career
- Language: English
- Notable awards: Oregon Book Award, Whiting Award, Independent Publisher Book Award
- Website: elenapassarello.com

Elena Passarello is an American writer, actor, and professor. In 2018, she became the announcer for the PRX variety show and podcast Live Wire with Luke Burbank.

== Career ==
Originally from Charleston, South Carolina, Passarello studied nonfiction at the University of Pittsburgh and The Nonfiction Writing Program at the University of Iowa. Her essays have been published in The New York Times, Virginia Quarterly Review, Audubon and Oxford American. She is the recipient of a 2015 Whiting Award in nonfiction.

Her first essay collection, Let Me Clear My Throat, (Note: "Let me clear my throat" is the eponymous lyric from 1996 hip-hop song "Let Me Clear My Throat".) was published by Sarabande in 2012 and received the gold medal for nonfiction at the 2013 Independent Publisher Book Awards. Passarello's second collection, Animals Strike Curious Poses (Note: "Animals strike curious poses" is a lyric from 1984 Prince song "When Doves Cry".) (Sarabande 2017), is a bestiary of famous animals. The book received favorable reviews from The New York Times, Publishers Weekly, Booklist, and The Guardian. It was listed as a New York Times Notable Book of 2017 and in The Guardian and Publishers Weekly's Best Books of 2017. In May 2018, it received the Oregon Book Award. The book has been translated into German, Italian, Dutch, and Chinese.

Her essays have also appeared in several anthologies, including The Best American Science and Nature Writing, Pop When the World Falls Apart, "Dear McSweeney's", Cat is Art Spelled Wrong, and Little Boxes: Twelve Writers on Television. She co-edits the In Place Reading Series for West Virginia University Press and edits nonfiction for Iron Horse Literary Review at Texas Tech University.

Passarello also has credits as a performer, having originated roles in plays by David Turkel (Wild Signs, Holler) and Christopher Durang (Mrs. Bob Cratchit's Wild Christmas Binge), as well as several voice-over credits. Passarello was the first woman to win the Stella Screaming Contest in New Orleans in 2011. She is currently an Associate Professor of Creative Writing in the MFA program at Oregon State University in Corvallis, Oregon.

== Awards ==
- 2018 Oregon Book Award Winner
- 2015 Whiting Award Winner
- 2014 Oregon Book Award finalist
- 2013 Gold Medal for Nonfiction, Independent Publisher Book Awards
- 2011 Fellowship, Macdowell Colony
- 2010 Fellowship, Hambidge Center

== Bibliography ==
- . Louisville, KY: Sarabande. 2017. ISBN 978-1941411391.
- Let Me Clear My Throat. Louisville, KY: Sarabande. 2012. ISBN 978-1936747450.
