= Eugene Field =

American writer (1850–1895)

Eugene Field Sr.
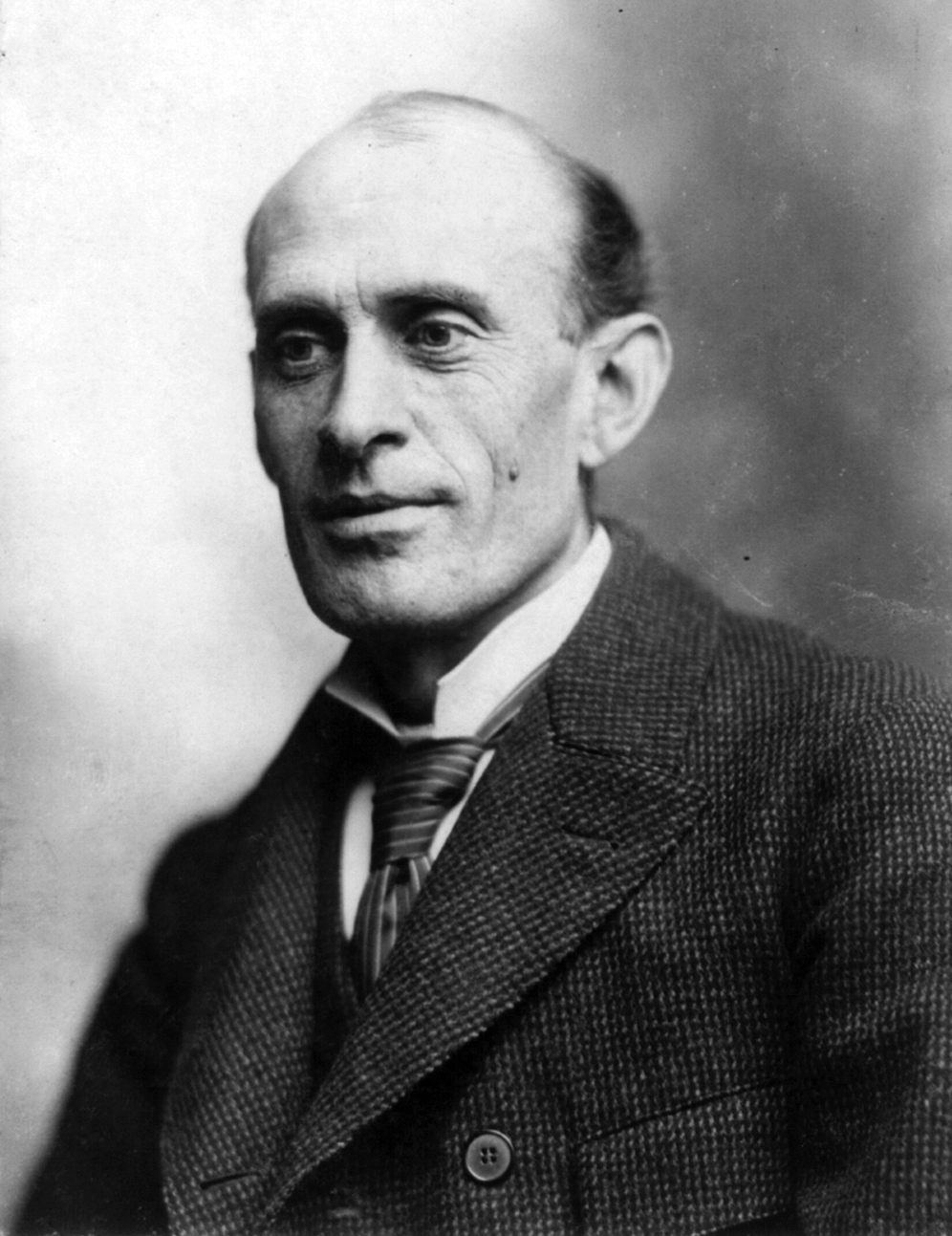
- Portrait, 1895
- Born: September 2, 1850; St. Louis, Missouri, US
- Died: November 4, 1895 (aged 45); Chicago, Illinois
- Occupation: Writer
- Children: 8, including Eugene Field II

Eugene Field Sr. (September 2, 1850 – November 4, 1895) was an American writer, best known for his children's poetry and humorous essays. He was known as the "poet of childhood".

== Early life and education ==
Field was born in St. Louis, Missouri, at 634 S. Broadway, where today his boyhood home is open to the public as The Eugene Field House and St. Louis Toy Museum. After the death of his mother in 1856, he was raised by an aunt, Mary Field French, in Amherst, Massachusetts.

Field's father, attorney Roswell Martin Field, was the lawyer who filed Dred Scott's case.

Field attended Williams College in Williamstown, Massachusetts. His father died when Eugene turned 19, and he subsequently dropped out of Williams after eight months. He then went to Knox College in Galesburg, Illinois, but dropped out after a year, followed by the University of Missouri in Columbia, Missouri, where his brother Roswell was also attending. Field was not a serious student and spent much of his time at school playing practical jokes. He led raids on the president's wine cellar, painted the president's house school colors, and fired the school's landmark cannons at midnight. Field tried acting, studied law with little success, and also wrote for the student newspaper. He then set off for a trip through Europe but returned to the United States six months later, penniless.

== Career ==
Field then set to work as a journalist for the St. Joseph Gazette in Saint Joseph, Missouri, in 1875. That same year he married Julia Comstock, with whom he had eight children. For the rest of his life he arranged for all the money he earned to be sent to his wife, saying that he had no head for money himself.

Field soon rose to city editor of the Gazette.

He became known for his light, humorous articles written in a gossipy style, some of which were reprinted by other newspapers around the country. It was during this time that he wrote the famous poem "Lovers Lane" about a street in St. Joseph, Missouri.

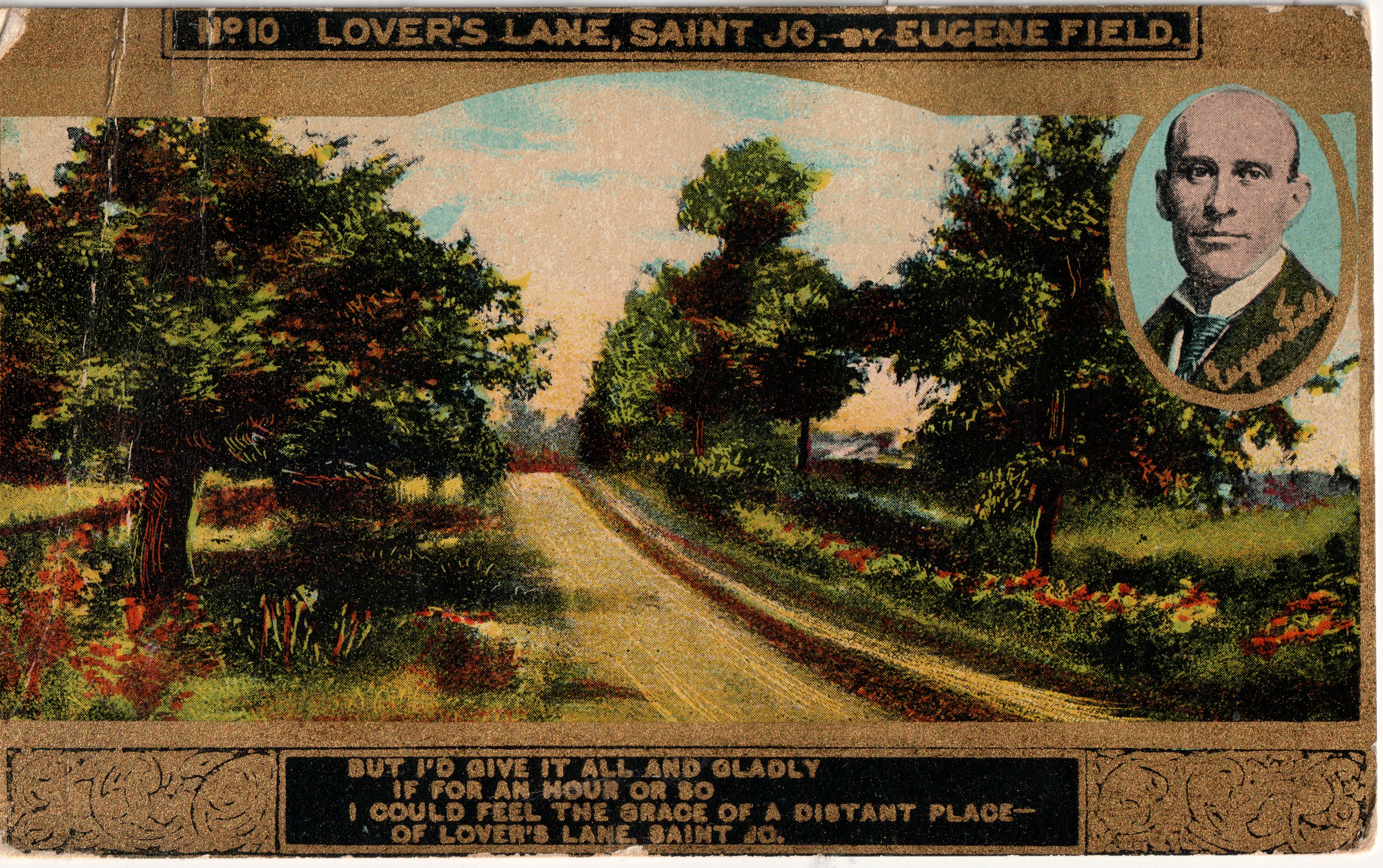
Lover's Lane, Saint Jo by Eugene Field - early 20th century postcard image

From 1876 through 1880, Field lived in St. Louis, first as an editorial writer for the Morning Journal and subsequently for the Times-Journal. After a brief stint as managing editor of the Kansas City Times, he worked for two years as editor of the Denver Tribune.

In 1883, Field moved to Chicago where he wrote a humorous newspaper column called Sharps and Flats for the Chicago Daily News. His home in Chicago was near the intersection of N. Clarendon and W. Hutchinson in the neighborhood now known as Buena Park.

The Sharps and Flats column ran in the newspaper's morning edition. In it, Field made quips about issues and personalities of the day, especially in the arts and literature. A pet subject was the intellectual greatness of Chicago, especially compared to Boston. In April 1887, Field wrote, "While Chicago is humping herself in the interests of literature, art and the sciences, vain old Boston is frivoling away her precious time in an attempted renaissance of the cod fisheries." Also that year, Chicago's National League baseball club sold future baseball Hall of Famer Mike "King" Kelly to Boston, and coincidentally soon after, famous Boston poet and diplomat James Russell Lowell made a speaking tour of Chicago. "Chicago feels a special interest in Mr. Lowell at this particular time because he is perhaps the foremost representative of the enterprising and opulent community which within the last week has secured the services of one of Chicago's honored sons for the base-ball season of 1887," Field wrote. "The fact that Boston has come to Chicago for the captain of her baseball nine has reinvigorated the bonds of affection between the metropolis of the Bay state [sic] and the metropolis of the mighty west; the truth of this will appear in the mighty welcome which our public will give Mr. Lowell next Tuesday."

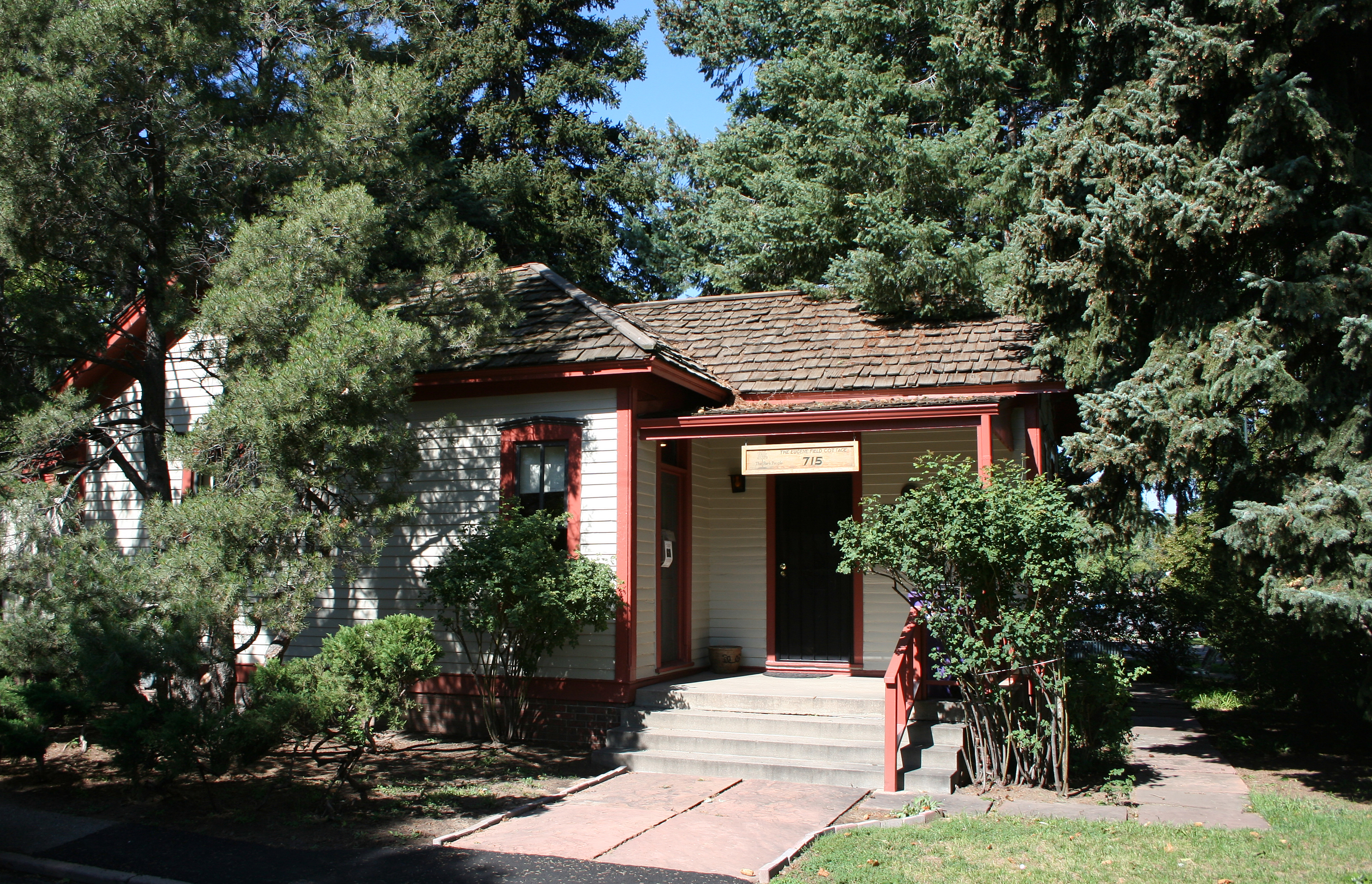
Eugene Field House in Denver, Colorado is on the National Register of Historic Places.

Four months later, upon Kelly's first return to Chicago as a player for Boston, Field would speak to "Col. Samuel J. Bosbyshell, the Prairie avenue millionaire." Bosbyshell said, "I like Mr. Kelly better than I do Lowell. When Lowell was here I had him out to the house to a $3,500 dinner, and do what I could, I couldn't get him waked up. He didn't seem to want to talk about anything but literature. Now, when I'm out in society I make it a point never to talk shop, and Lowell's peculiarity mortified me. If it hadn't been for [Chicago humorist] Frank Lincoln, with his imitations and funny stories, the dinner would have been a stupid affair. But Kelly is another kind of man; he is more versatile than Lowell. I don't believe he mentioned books once during the four hours we sat at dinner last Saturday evening. Nor did he confine his conversation to base-ball topics; he is deeply versed in turf lore, and he talked most entertainingly of the prominent race horses he was acquainted with and of the leading jockeys he has met."

Field first started publishing poetry in 1879, with his poem "Christmas Treasures" that later appeared in his collection A Little Book of Western Verse. Over a dozen volumes of poetry followed, starting in 1889, and he became well known for his light-hearted poems for children, among the most famous of which are "Wynken, Blynken, and Nod" and "The Duel" (which is perhaps better known as "The Gingham Dog and the Calico Cat"). Equally famous is his poem about the death of a child, "Little Boy Blue". Field also published a number of short stories, including "The Holy Cross" and "Daniel and the Devil".

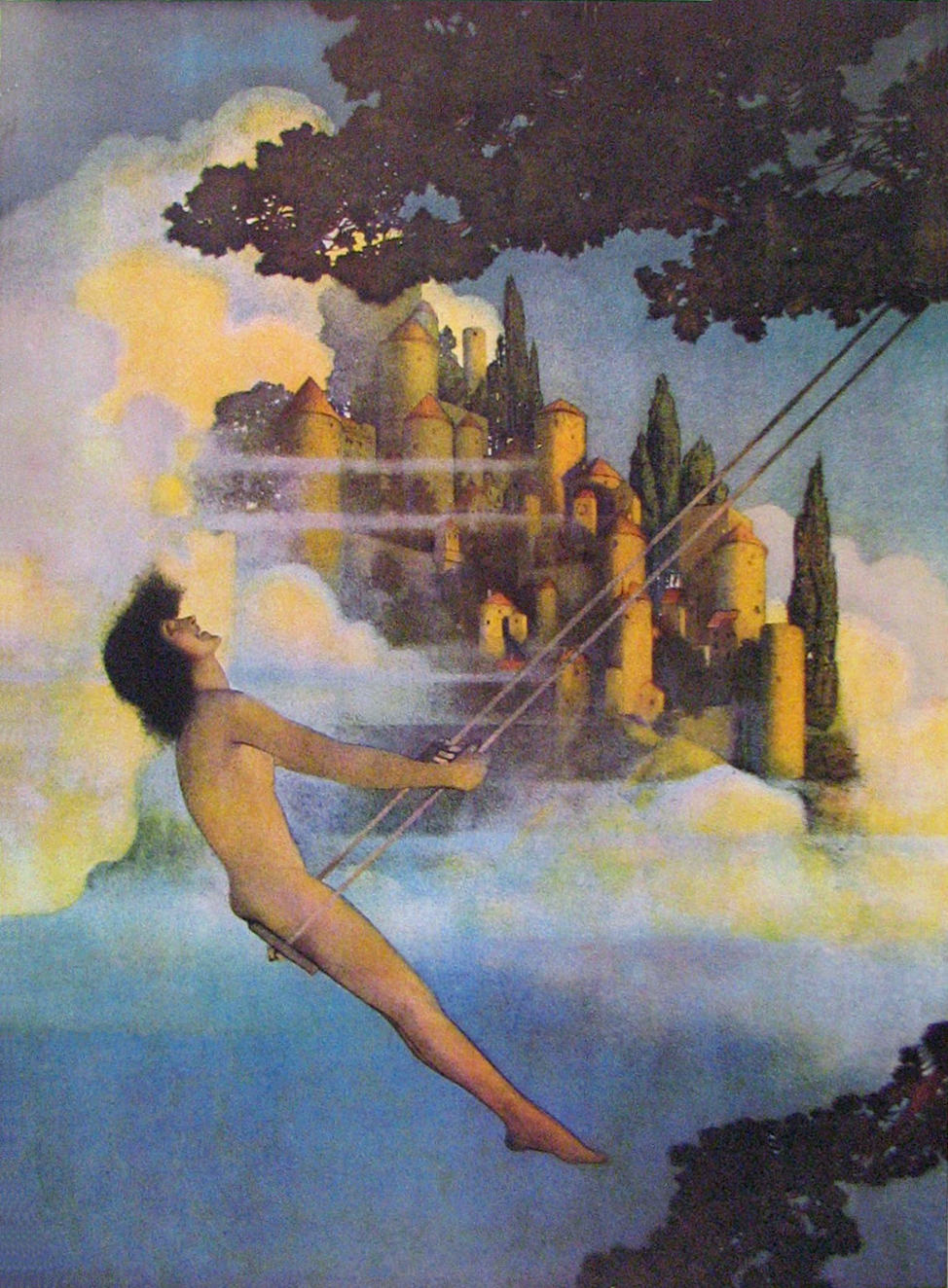
The Dinky Bird by Maxfield Parrish, one of eight color plates from the 1904 collection Poems of Childhood

Field died in Chicago of a heart attack at the age of 45. He is buried at the Church of the Holy Comforter in Kenilworth, Illinois. Slason Thompson's 1901 biography of Field states that he was originally buried in Graceland Cemetery in Chicago, but his son-in-law, Senior Warden of the Church of the Holy Comforter, had him reinterred on March 7, 1926.

The volume The Love Affairs of a Bibliomaniac was published posthumously with an introduction by Field's brother, Roswell Martin Field, in 1896.

== Legacy ==
Field had a varied career and wrote in multiple genres and formats. However, he became best known for his poems for children. Several of his poems were set to music with commercial success. Many of his works were printed with accompanying paintings from Maxfield Parrish.

His childhood home in St. Louis is now a museum. The Eugene Field House contains many of Field's mementos, including original manuscripts, books, furniture, personal effects, and some of the toys that inspired his poems.

One of Field's sons, Eugene Field II, was a signature forger, while a granddaughter, Gene Field Foster, was an archaeologist.

Field has his own star on the St. Louis Walk of Fame, having been elected there in 1991.

In 2016, Field was inducted into the Chicago Literary Hall of Fame.

As a memorial to Field, a statue of the Dream Lady from his poem "Rock-a-by-Lady" was erected in 1922 at the Lincoln Park Zoo in Chicago. There is also a park and fieldhouse named in his honor in Chicago's Albany Park neighborhood. In nearby Oak Park, Illinois, another park is named in his honor; a sign there offers a brief biography. A statue of Wynken, Blynken and Nod adorns Washington Park, near Field's Denver home. Another statue of Wynken, Blynken and Nod sits in the center of the town square (called "the green" by locals) in Wellsboro, Pa.

Numerous elementary schools throughout the Midwest are named for him, e.g. Eugene Field Elementary School in Chicago, Illinois; Wheeling, Illinois; Rock Island, Illinois; Elmhurst, Illinois; Normal, Illinois; Park Ridge, Illinois; Maryville, Missouri; St. Joseph, Missouri; Hannibal, Missouri; Carthage, Missouri (closed in 1997); Columbia, Missouri; Mexico, Missouri; Neosho, Missouri; Poplar Bluff, Missouri; Springfield, Missouri; Webb City, Missouri; Manhattan, Kansas; Ottawa, Kansas; Minneapolis, Minnesota; and formerly in Muncie, Indiana (closed in 1973).

Other schools named after Field are located in Littleton, Colorado; Mitchell, South Dakota;Sioux Falls, South Dakota; Tulsa, Oklahoma; Altus, Oklahoma; Oklahoma City, Oklahoma; Hugo, Oklahoma; Beaumont, Texas; Houston, Texas; Albuquerque, New Mexico; Mesa, Arizona; Pasadena, California; San Diego, California; and Silverton, Oregon.

One of the branches of the Denver Public Library near Field's Denver home is named after him, as is an apartment building in Denver's Poet's Row. A dormitory in the Orchard Hill residential area at the University of Massachusetts Amherst also bears Field's name.

Field wrote and published an anonymous work about a 12-year-old boy being seduced by a woman in her 30s. It was titled "Only a Boy". In a 1934 essay, American drama critic and magazine editor George Jean Nathan recalled it as a popular forbidden work among those coming of age at the turn of the century, along with Fanny Hill. It was published by Grove Press in 1968 with the real author's name.

== Books ==
This list includes works published during Field's lifetime and posthumously.

- The Denver Tribune Primer (1882)
- CULTURE’S GARLAND: The Gradual Rise of Literature, etc., in Chicago ; with introduction by Julian Hawthorne (1887)
- The Stag Party (1888–1889), contains almost all of Field's erotic pieces, including Only a Boy
- A Little Book of Western Verse (1889)
- A Little Book of Profitable Tales (1889)
- Echoes from the Sabine Farm (1891, with his brother Roswell field; translations of poetry by Horace
- With Trumpet and Drum (1892)
- The Second Book of Verse (1892)
- The Holy Cross and Other Tales (1893)
- Love Songs of Childhood (1894)
- The Love Affairs of a Bibliomaniac (1896)
- The House: An Episode in the Lives of Reuben Baker, Astronomer, and of his Wife Alice (1896)
- Songs and Other Verse (1896)
- Second Book of Tales (1896)
- An Auto-Analysis: How One Friar Met the Devil and Two Pursued Him (1896)
- Lullaby Land: Songs of Childhood (1897), selected by Kenneth Grahame and Charles Robinson
- Nonsense for Old and Young (1901)
- The Stars: A Slumber Story (1903)
- Poems of Childhood (1904)
- Sharps and Flats: The Writings in Prose and Verse of Eugene Field (2 vols.; 1900)
- Selected Works of Eugene Field (4 vols; The Clink of the Ice, Hoosier Lyrics, In Wink-a-Way Land, John Smith, U.S.A.; 1905)
- Poems of Eugene Field : The Complete Edition (1910)
- Christmas Tales and Christmas Verse (1912)
- Verse and Prose (1917)

== See also ==
- Nick Kenny
- O. O. McIntyre
