= Eugene Field II =

Eugene Field II (1887–1944) was an American forger and the son of poet Eugene Field. Among others, Field forged the signatures of his father, the poets Bret Harte and Rudyard Kipling, the US presidents Abraham Lincoln and Theodore Roosevelt, and humorist Mark Twain.

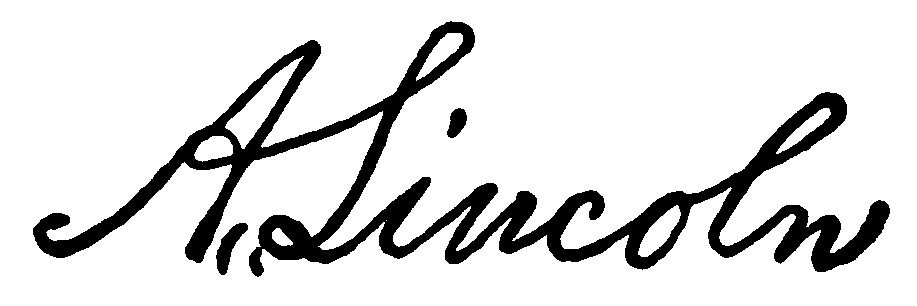
Sickles and Field copied Abraham Lincoln's style of signature onto old documents, which they sold as genuine.

While selling off his famous father's library, Field came into contact with Harry Dayton Sickles, an autograph dealer and rare book seller in Chicago. In the 1930s, Sickles and Field produced what became known as the "Coachman Forgeries". At this time, they forged Lincoln's signature onto genuine older books, pamphlets, maps, sheet music, and other documents and claimed that the objects had belonged to Lincoln and had been given to William P. Brown by Lincoln's widow. Brown had been briefly popular in the US national news in 1931 for claiming to have been the coachman for Mary Todd Lincoln sometime after Lincoln's 1865 assassination and before her death in 1882. Brown signed witnessed statements that the articles had previously belonged to Lincoln's widow. Sickles and Field would then forge fake signatures on the older books and sell them to unsuspecting collectors. Some of the forgeries are obvious upon inspection; for example, two of them are on documents published after Lincoln's death. The forgeries are now considered collectables, though without the high value that could be expected for genuine signatures. For example, in 2005, one such forgery was expected to sell for US$300 to $500.
