= Mrs. Bob Cratchit's Wild Christmas Binge =

Play written by Christopher Durang

Mrs. Bob Cratchit's Wild Christmas Binge is a musical comedy written by Christopher Durang, a parody of the Charles Dickens 1843 novel A Christmas Carol. Durang was commissioned by Pittsburgh City Theatre Artistic Director Tracy Brigden to write a Christmas comedy. The show premiered November 7, 2002 at the City Theatre with Kristine Nielsen in the title role.

== Plot ==
The premise of the parody is the question, "What if Dickens' Mrs. Cratchit wasn't so goody-goody, but instead was an angry, stressed-out modern-day American woman who wanted out of this harsh London 1840s life?" The main character in Binge is the hard-drinking, suicidal Gladys Cratchit. The other two leads are The Ghost and Ebenezer Scrooge. The Ghost, whose character is written to be an African-American woman, plays the narrator role as she escorts Ebenezer Scrooge through the past, present and future of his life. But, as she says, everything keeps going "kaplooey" because she can't get her magic to work properly. In their first journey, the Ghost tries to take Scrooge to his past at the Fezziwig Christmas party, but they end up at the Cratchits' home in the present, where we meet Mrs. Cratchit and her eternally hungry yet eternally sunny children, all 21 of them. The majority of the 21 live in "a bunch in the root cellar."

Most of the characters retain their original Dickensian qualities. Ebenezer Scrooge is old and miserly. Bob Cratchit is the gentle family man who is the primary target of Scrooge's cheapness. Tiny Tim is crippled and heart-rending. Equally heart-rending is Little Nell from Dickens' The Old Curiosity Shop, who appears as one of the Cratchit children.

Durang adds many classic allusions and pop-culture references to the story, including scenes where the Ghost accidentally takes Scrooge to the lives of Oliver Twist and Leona Helmsley. The play also makes stops in It's a Wonderful Life, the Enron scandal, The Gift of the Magi, and Touched by an Angel.

== Songs ==
There are four original songs in Binge, lyrics by Durang and music by Michael Friedman.

1. "It's Nearly Christmas", Act One, Scene 1
2. "Fezziwig Song", Act One, Scene 6
3. "Yummy Yum Yum", Act One, Scene 9
4. "Finale", Act Two, Scene 13

== Original cast ==
- January Murelli - The Ghost of Christmas Past/Present/and Future
- Douglas Rees - Ebeneezer Scrooge
- Kristine Nielsen - Mrs. Bob Cratchit
- Martin Giles - Bob Cratchit
- Darren E. Focareta - Tiny Tim
- Sheila McKenna - Little Nell Cratchit / Mrs. Fezziwig /The Beadle's Wife
- Lauren Rose Gigliotti or Allison Hannon - Cratchit Child 1 / Young Jacob Marley / Zuzu Bailey
- Shane Jordan or Matt Lang - Cratchit Child 2 / Young Ebeneezer Scrooge
- Jeff Howell, Matthew Gaydos - Gentlemen Collecting for Christmas (Kenneth Lay, Jeffrey Skilling)
- Larry John Meyers - Jacob Marley's Ghost / Bartender 1 / Clarence (the angel)
- Jeff Howell - Mr. Fezziwig / The Beadle / Bartender 2
- Darren E. Focareta and Elena Passarello - Fezziwig Daughters
- Matthew Gaydos - Edvar / George Bailey / Serena the maid
- Elena Passarello - Hedwig / Monica (the angel) / The Nice Mrs. Cratchit

== Reviews ==
- Talkin' Broadway for the 2002 world premiere at City Theatre in Philadelphia.
- The Philadelphia Inquirer for a 2012 revival at the New City Stage in Philadelphia.
- Penn Live for a 2012 performance in Mechanicsburg, Pennsylvania.
- TheaterJones for a 2013 run at the Richardson Theatre Centre in Texas.
- The Column for the 2013 run at the Richardson Theatre Centre.
- Syracuse New Times for a 2013 run at the Central New York Playhouse in Syracuse, New York.

== See also ==
- Adaptations of A Christmas Carol
