= Dolly Parton's Smoky Mountain Christmas Carol =

2019 musical

- Music: Dolly Parton
- Lyrics: Dolly Parton
- Book: David H. Bell
- Basis: A Christmas Carol by Charles Dickens
- Productions: 2019 Boston; 2022 London

Dolly Parton's Smoky Mountain Christmas Carol is a stage musical with music and lyrics by Dolly Parton with a book by David H. Bell (adapted by Bell, Paul T. Couch and Curt Wollan). It is an adaptation of Charles Dickens' 1843 novella A Christmas Carol, relocating the story from Victorian London to the 1930s in the Great Smoky Mountains of Tennessee.

== Production history ==
=== World premiere: Boston (2019) ===
The musical had its world premiere at the Colonial Theatre in Boston from December 3-29, 2019. The production was directed by Curt Wollan.

=== Vancouver (2021) ===
The musical made its Canadian premiere at the Stanley Industrial Alliance Stage in Vancouver from November 18, 2021 until January 2, 2022. The production was directed by Bobby Garcia.

=== London (2022) ===
The musical made its UK premiere in the Queen Elizabeth Hall at the Southbank Centre in London from 8 December 2022 to 8 January 2023. The production was choreographed and directed by Alison Pollard.
