= Amy Leach (theatre director) =

British theatre director

- Born: 14 April 1981 (age 45); Darwen, Lancashire, England
- Occupation: Theatre Director
- Years active: 2003–present
- Website: http://www.amyleach.co.uk/

Amy Leach (born 14 April 1981) is a British theatre director. She was first Associate Director (2017–2022) and then Deputy Artistic Director (2022–2025) of Leeds Playhouse. She is an Olivier Award-nominated and UK Theatre Award-winning director, recognized for her commitment to creatively accessible theatre.

== Early life and career ==
Leach grew up in Darwen, Lancashire. As a teenager, she attended the youth theatre at the Bolton Octagon Theatre. On graduating from Durham University, she co-founded the theatre company for young people, en masse, with playwright and composer Oliver Birch.

en masse toured nationally and internationally between 2003 and 2011. For that company, Leach directed and produced UK tours of Spaceship ’87, The Echo Chamber, The Ignatius Trail, The Shelter, The Iceberg, We All Fall Down and The Wonderful Wizard of Oz, a co-production with the Dukes Theatre, Lancaster.

== Later career ==
Leach directed Animal Farm, a co-production with Leeds Playhouse, Theatre Royal Stratford East and Nottingham Playhouse which was nominated for Best Production in Affiliate Theatre at the Olivier Awards 2025 and won Best Play Revival at the UK Theatre Awards 2025.

At Leeds Playhouse (formerly West Yorkshire Playhouse) Leach has directed Mr Snow, Lord of the Flies, Macbeth, Don't You Know It's Going to Be Alright, There Are No Beginnings, Hamlet, A Christmas Carol, Road, Talking Heads, Queen of Chapeltown, Romeo & Juliet, Kes & The Night Before Christmas. Her production of Oliver Twist for Leeds Playhouse and Ramps on the Moon was recorded for NT at Home. Leach has also directed work at a range of UK theatres including Hull Truck, Sherman Theatre Cardiff and Royal Exchange Theatre Manchester.
