= Players of Utica =

Historic community theater

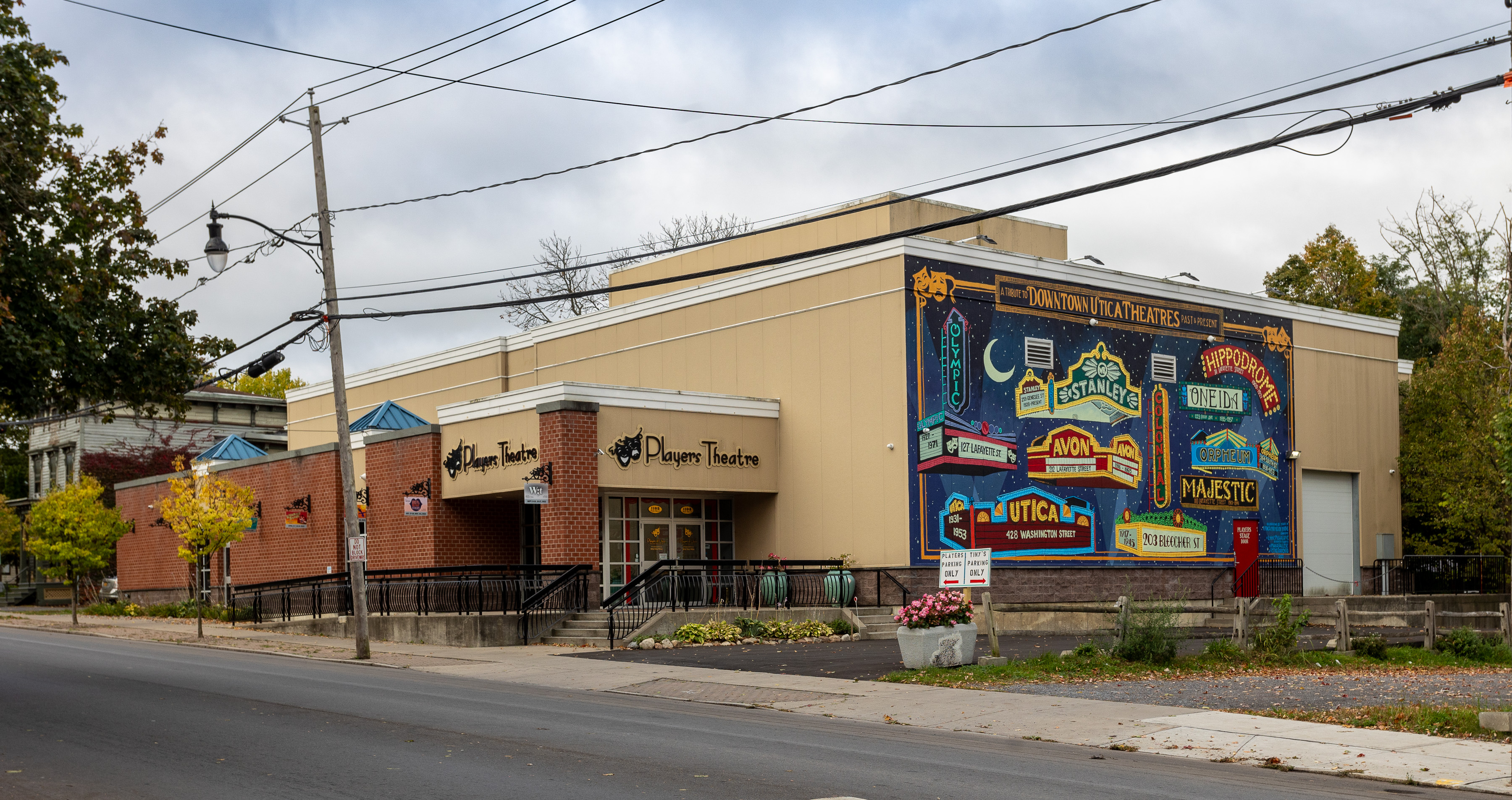
Players Theatre

Players of Utica is a community theater located at 1108 State Street in Utica, New York. It opened in 1913 and is the oldest community theater in New York State. It is also one of the five oldest community theaters in the United States. The theater offers five main-stage performances each season plus original works, occasional cabarets, and other entertainments. Mission statement: "To present entertainment that enriches, excites, and challenges all members of our diverse community."

== History ==
=== Early history ===
Originally, Players of Utica was called "The Amusement Club", which was an amateur drama group beginning in 1907. In 1913, the club was renamed “The Players.” They developed the amateur drama club expanding the field where they performed. “Before building their current home at 1108 State Street, the Players have occupied a number of different locations in the Utica area.” Additionally, their plays were mostly held in a city auditorium, and most of the performances were one-act plays. Later, they used a stage at the Utica County Day School. Since that time, The Players began to hire a professional director, Frank Stirling. They also rented a space on Mandeville Street, and they built a house, “The Player’s Workshop,” in 1924. They held almost all of their productions there, and the major casts, technical crew, and directors were paid from the profits earned from ticket sales. They also began to perform most productions at the workshop. Some touring performances were held at that time, so the number of its members increased approximately from 500 to 2000. They performed in the New Hartford Theater as their own theater by 1929. The Players’ orchestration was improved in 1939 by hiring their own orchestra group for 20 years.

=== World War II Era ===
The time of World War II (1939–1945) influenced the running of The Players. They lost the house, “The Players of Workshop” in 1943. Restoring costumes, electrical devices, props, and other materials that had collected in years was financially difficult. They evacuated to a warehouse in North Utica with some remaining implements to keep showing their performances. The Players were finally allowed to use a space in St. Francis de Sales as a stage. Nevertheless, they could not do the same quality as before due to the lack of props, electric devices, and costumes. Right after World War II, in 1948, The Players rented a movie theater, which gave them one day to do a rehearsal onstage, and the rest of the rehearsals were done at the Y.M.C.A. In 1950, however, The Players got another opportunity to purchase a movie theater, The Paris Cinema, and they started to run with a new stage again.

=== Middle Era to Present ===
The Players began to incorporate a new system in the theater in 1939. Junior actors, who performed twice a year, were hired to perform. In addition, volunteers were used to manage and help the theater. Eventually, they purchased another space at the Methodist Church on Oxford Road, New Hartford, New York. The Players also improved the financial management of the group by performing plays such as Stalag 17, Show Boat, South Pacific, Oklahoma!, Detective Story, and Death of a Salesman. In 1973, the second stage, called Glenn Flagg Pub, was built downstairs, which showed productions performed by children. However, in 1999, The Players lost their theater in New Hartford to a fire, which destroyed almost all of the implements that they had gathered over thirty years. It was one of the highly publicized, unsolved arson incidents in Oneida County, New York. Players of Utica reported, “All that remained was blackened timbers and, ironically, the shell of the steeple we had planned to remove because it was structurally unsound.” The next day, the event, Moon Over Buffalo, directed by Robert Barone was cancelled because of the fire. They discharged their debt for the construction in 2011 by an anonymous donor. The Players of Utica greeted their 100th anniversary in 2012.

== Funding ==
Players of Utica is funded by ticket sales, advertising in playbills, performances, concessions, and other donations. It is still seeking funding to complete its main stage theatre.

== Social Involvement ==
Players of Utica provides space in its theatre for the ARC and other local organizations.
