= Ebenezer and the Invisible World =

- Developers: Play on Worlds; Orbit Studio
- Publisher: Play on Worlds
- Engine: Unity
- Platforms: Nintendo Switch; PlayStation 4; PlayStation 5; Windows; Xbox One; Xbox Series X/S
- Release: WW: November 3, 2023
- Genre: Metroidvania
- Mode: Single-player

Ebenezer and the Invisible World is a Metroidvania video game developed by Play on Worlds and Orbit Studio, and published by Play on Worlds. It was released on 3 November 2023.

== Gameplay ==
After the events of A Christmas Carol, Ebenezer Scrooge is visited by a ghost who requests his help in stopping a greedy industrialist. Ebenezer and the Invisible World is a Metroidvania game in which players gather items and power-ups, fight evil ghosts, and attempt to save the poor people of London.

== Development ==
Play on Worlds released Ebenezer and the Invisible World for Windows, PlayStation 4 and 5, Xbox One and Series X/S, and Switch on November 3, 2023.

== Reception ==
Ebenezer and the Invisible World received mixed reviews on Metacritic. Shacknews said its "execution falls short on nearly all fronts". Although they liked the art, they said it made the hitboxes difficult to detect, and they felt the generous amount of power-ups meant that combat was too easy. They also felt the gameplay was too derivative and the story lacked characterization for Scrooge. Nintendo World enjoyed the combat and platform elements, but they encountered many bugs on the Switch, which they said ruined their experience. Push Square likewise recommended against the game based on bugs, though they praised the story and art.
