= Little Boy Blue (poem) =

Poem by Eugene Field

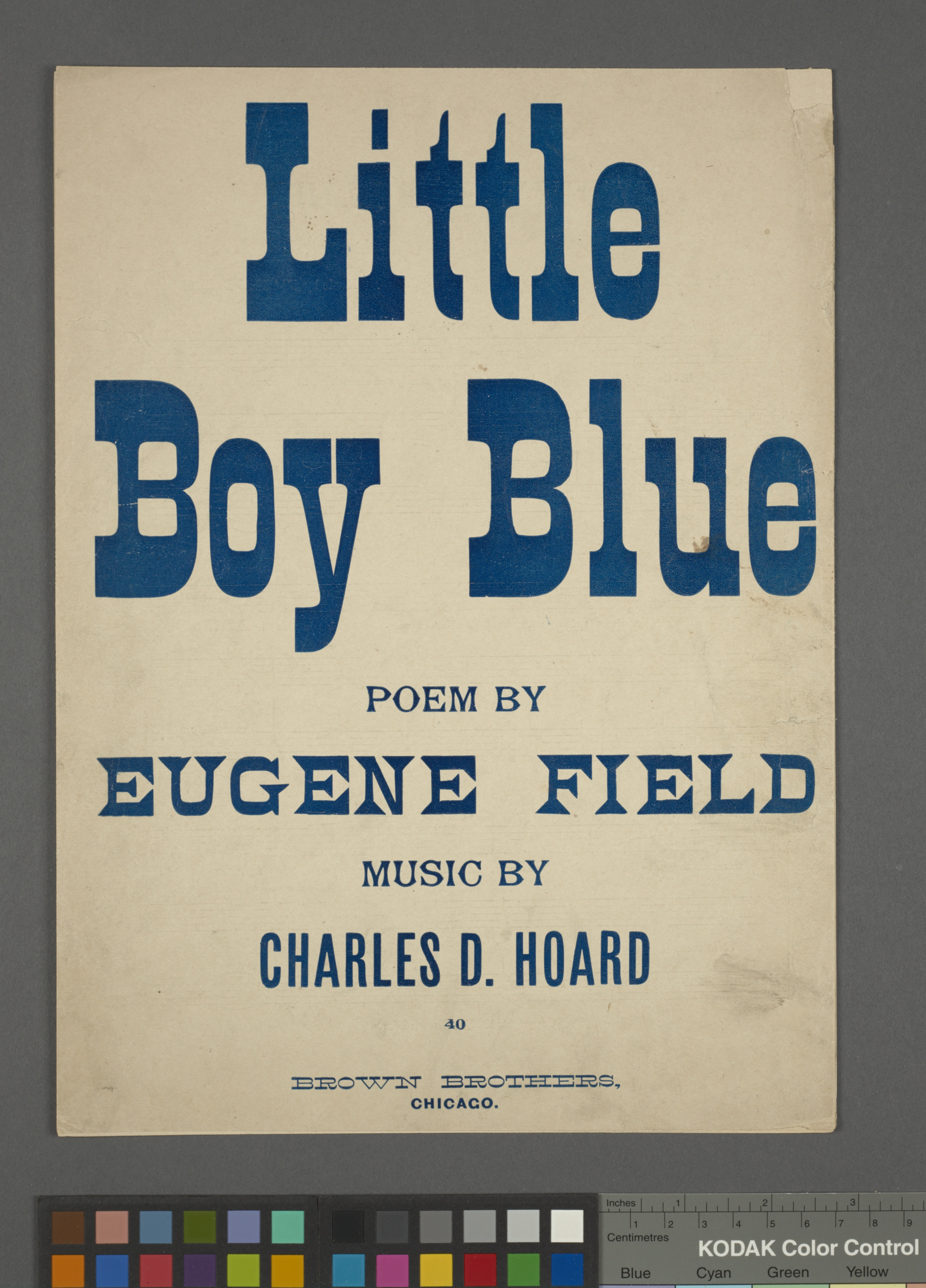
Little Boy Blue by Eugene Field

"Little Boy Blue" is a poem by Eugene Field about the death of a child, a sentimental but beloved theme in 19th-century poetry. Contrary to popular belief, the poem is not about the death of Field's son, who died several years after its publication. Field once admitted that the words "Little Boy Blue" occurred to him when he needed a rhyme for the seventh line in the first stanza. The poem first appeared in 1888 in the Chicago weekly literary journal America. Its editor, Slason Thompson, changed the penultimate line ("That they have never seen our Little Boy Blue") to its present form. The poem was republished by Charles Scribner's Sons in 1889 in Field's The Little Book of Western Verse. In 1976, Frank Jacobs wrote a parody of the poem for Mad magazine.

An 1891 song setting of Field's poem by composer Ethelbert Nevin (1862–1901) was made popular by tenor John McCormack. The Welsh-American tenor Evan Williams (1867 - 1918) also recorded this song for Victor Red Seal records. A spoken-word recording (with accompaniment) was also made by Wink Martindale and it appears on his Deck of Cards album. More recently, the song was covered by American tenor Casey Jones Costello for his 2019 album, Trees and Other Sentimental Songs of Bygone Days.

In 2019, the Texas-based folk band JamisonPriest released the song "Little Boy Blue" using the lyrics of this poem.

An old time radio show from the 1950’s called Family Theater has an episode dedicated to the poem and dramatizes the life of Eugene Field and origins of the poem.

== Text ==
The little toy dog is covered with dust,
But sturdy and staunch he stands;
And the little toy soldier is red with rust,
And his musket molds in his hands.
Time was when the little toy dog was new,
And the soldier was passing fair;
And that was the time when our Little Boy Blue
Kissed them and put them there.

"Now, don't you go till I come," he said,
"And don't you make any noise!"
So, toddling off to his trundle-bed,
He dreamed of the pretty toys;
And, as he was dreaming, an angel song
Awakened our Little Boy Blue
Oh! the years are many, the years are long,
But the little toy friends are true!

Ay, faithful to Little Boy Blue they stand,
Each in the same old place
Awaiting the touch of a little hand,
The smile of a little face;
And they wonder, as waiting the long years through
In the dust of that little chair,
What has become of our Little Boy Blue,
Since he kissed them and put them there.

== See also ==
- Little Boy Blue
