= Bob Cratchit =

- A Christmas Carol character
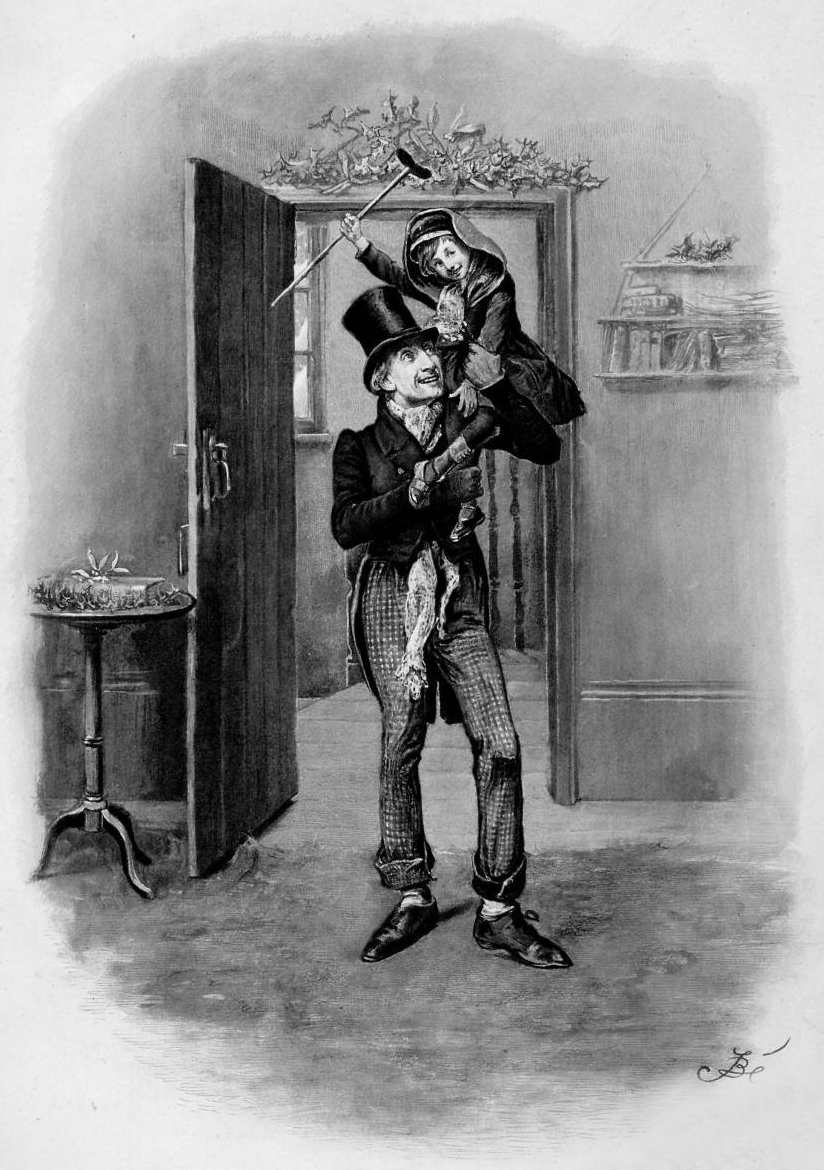
- Bob Cratchit and Tiny Tim as depicted in the 1870s by Fred Barnard
- First appearance: A Christmas Carol 1843
- Created by: Charles Dickens

In-universe information
- Nickname: Bob
- Gender: Male
- Occupation: Money accountant (Clerk)
- Spouse: Mrs. Cratchit (named Emily in some adaptations)
- Children: Martha; Belinda; Peter; Tiny Tim an unnamed son (named Matthew in some adaptations) an unnamed daughter (named Lucy or Gillian in some adaptions)
- Nationality: English

Robert Cratchit is a fictional character in the Charles Dickens 1843 novel A Christmas Carol. The overworked, underpaid clerk of Ebenezer Scrooge, Cratchit has come to symbolize the poor working conditions, especially long working hours and low pay, endured by many working-class people in the early Victorian era.

Cratchit's son, Tiny Tim, is also a defining character in the novel.

== In the novel ==
Scrooge threatens to sack his clerk if he asks for more coal to heat the fire. Cratchit wears his woollen scarf at work as he is so cold. When Cratchit timidly asks Scrooge for Christmas Day off work so he can be with his family, he notes it only comes once a year. Scrooge reluctantly agrees on the condition that Cratchit comes to work early the day after Christmas.

Cratchit and his family live in poverty because Scrooge pays him so little, a practice common to most employers in Dickens's time. Cratchit's son, Tiny Tim, is very ill. According to the Ghost of Christmas Present, Tim will die because the family is too poor to give him the treatment he needs. While Scrooge is the "ogre" of the Cratchit family, with Cratchit's wife calling him out for his stinginess, Bob shows a generous spirit, as he mildly insists that they toast his health for Christmas Day. The Ghost of Christmas Yet to Come shows Scrooge the Cratchit family mourning the death of Tiny Tim, with Bob returning from the graveyard where Tim's funeral will take place, and paying his respects to Tim's body upstairs.

After Scrooge decides to change his ways on Christmas Day, he anonymously sends a Christmas turkey to Cratchit for his family's dinner. The next day, Scrooge states that he will increase Cratchit's salary immediately and promises to help his struggling family, expressing by offering Cratchit a drink of "smoking bishop", and even telling him to buy a coal-scuttle for his room. Bob is at first taken aback by Scrooge's transformation.

== Family ==
The Cratchit family has been described as "impoverished, hardworking, and warmhearted".

Seven members are mentioned in the original story, five of whom are named:

- Mrs. Cratchit, Bob Cratchit's wife, who is named "Emily" in some adaptations.
- Martha Cratchit, the eldest daughter, who works as an apprentice at a milliners, on the morning of Christmas Day.
- Belinda Cratchit, the second daughter.
- Peter Cratchit, the heir, for whom his father is arranging employment at the weekly rate of five shillings and sixpence.
- Timothy "Tiny Tim" Cratchit. The youngest child, he is desperately ill and walks with a crutch.

== In other media ==
The character of Bob Cratchit has been featured in works based on A Christmas Carol.

- Cratchit by Alexander Knott premiered at London's Park Theatre, with John Dagleish as Bob. The play "explores what might happen if Cratchit was visited by the Ghost of Christmas yet-to-come and shown a bleak vision of the future, where the gap between rich and poor has grown beyond measure."
- The character has been featured in the 2002 musical comedy Mrs. Bob Cratchit's Wild Christmas Binge.
