= Stephanos Papadopoulos =

Greek-American poet

Stephanos Papadopoulos (born 1976) is a Greek-American poet.

== Biography ==
Stephanos Papadopoulos was born in North Carolina and raised in Paris and Athens.

He is the author of three poetry collections: The Black Sea (November 2012, Sheep Meadow Press), Hôtel-Dieu (2009, Sheep Meadow Press), and Lost Days (2001, Leviathan Press, UK / Rattapallax Press, NY). He is editor and co-translator (with Katerina Anghelaki-Rooke) of Derek Walcott's Selected Poems in Greek, published by Kastianiotis Press, 2007. He was awarded a 2010 Civitella Ranieri Fellowship for The Black Sea, and was the recipient of the 2014 Jeannette Haien Ballard Writer's Prize, selected by Mark Strand.

== Poetry Books ==
- — (2001). Lost Days. Leviathan Press (UK), Rattapallax Press (NY). ISBN 1-903563-07-0.
- — (2009). Hotel-Dieu. New York: Sheep Meadow Press. ISBN 978-1-931357-71-5.
- — (2012). The Black Sea. Syracuse, New York: Syracuse University Press. ISBN 978-1937679095.

== Translations ==
- Walcott, Derek (2006). Selected Poems (in Greek). Translated by Katerina Aggelakē-Rouk; Stephanos Papadopoulos. Athens, Greece: Kastaniotis Editions. ISBN 960-03-4267-9.
- — (2011). Questi erano i nostri fragili eroi (in Italian). Translated by Matteo Campagnoli. Edizione Casagrande. ISBN 978-8877136183.

== Critical reception ==
Writing this good, this modest in its stance toward important matters, is hard to find in contemporary poetry. Our poet historians are too often earnest documentarians, but Papadopoulos goes for the life inside his stories, writing with an ear for the deeper music of grief.

— David Mason, The Hudson Review

One can hardly fail to notice the sensuality of Stephanos Papadopoulos' Lost Days. Frequently through flashing (but not flashy) metaphor, Papadopoulos creates too a sense of the infinite and intangible aspects of the world…Papadopoulos is able to pay tribute to such poets as Montale, Cavafy, and Brodsky without ever seeming dwarfed or dominated by them.

— Anthony Haynes, The Tablet, London

Stephanos Papadopoulos has several qualities as a poet, one of the most conspicuous being his talent for the elegiac, his ability to bring to life memories and artifacts from times past, 'before the gods became a circus out of work'. 'Some things will not collapse,' he winks at Sextus Propertius, and, in his poetry, they don't. 'If I am to have a talent,' he writes, 'let it be this... and hold a vision true, to a moment's epiphany...' Stephanos Papadopoulos has that talent.

— Bengt Jangfeldt

This first collection is a breath of meltemi, (wind) blowing away the stuffiness of so much current poetry.... It is easy to see him following in Seferis's footsteps but in the landscape of our own time... There is sometimes a nicely melancholy tone to Papadopoulos's work which puts him in the great tradition of poetic sorrows. But the elegance and flair in these poems makes the reader look forward to his next volume. Leviathan is wise to publish him.

— Anne Born, Tears in the Fence

When I first read Lost Days by Stephanos Papadopoulos, I was struck not only by the quality of the poetry itself but also by the atmosphere of universality that permeates the book. While the diction remains American, the poems move with great ease from Paris to Greece, to Sweden to New York. This tone and attitude denote of course, not a school of art but a testimony of a life's experience.

— Katerina Anghelaki-Rooke

A streetwise, well-traveled 'penseroso'. He has a distinctive body of subject matter. He has a sharp eye.... [W]ork so exceptionally rich in atmosphere and observation.

— Robert Saxton, Poetry Review

In his poetry, the melancholy of the modern finds its beauty in loss itself. Papadopoulos catches this beauty in poem after poem, while his poetry swims for joy in the Atlantic, Mediterranean and Aegean. This beautiful contradiction makes [Hotel-Dieu] a great pleasure to read and reread....

— Stanley Moss

== Awards ==
- 2014 The Jeannette Haien Ballard Writer's Prize
- 2010 Civitella Ranieri Fellowship
