= Leviathan Press =

Leviathan Press was the name of three different small press publishers — one based in San Francisco, one in Baltimore, and one in London.

Leviathan Press of San Francisco was known for co-publishing (with the Trotskyist publisher Pathfinder Press) Rius' Cuba For Beginners in 1970, a translation of Cuba para principiantes (1960). (The book made no particularly great impact, but eventually became the first title in the For Beginners series of graphic nonfiction books from Richard Appignanesi's Writers and Readers and later Icon Books.)

Leviathan Press of Baltimore was a publisher of Jewish-themed books on such topics as Purim, keeping kosher, and how Jewish culture shaped the American comic book superhero. The company operated from at least 1997 to 2014.

Leviathan Press of London, operated by Michael Hulse and David Hartnett, was a publisher of poetry books and the journal Leviathan Quarterly. The UK Leviathan Press operated from 2001 to 2004.

== Titles published (selected) ==
=== San Francisco publisher ===
- Rius (1970). Cuba For Beginners. San Francisco: Leviathan Press; New York: Pathfinder Press.

=== Baltimore publisher ===
- Apisdorf, Shimon (1998). The One Hour Purim Primer: Everything a Family Needs to Understand, Celebrate and Enjoy Purim. Leviathan Press. OCLC 44122322.
- Apisdorf, Shimon (2005). Kosher for the Clueless but Curious: A Fun, Fact-Filled, and Spiritual Guide to All Things Kosher. Leviathan Press. ISBN 1881927318.
- Weinstein, Simcha (2006). Up, Up and Oy Vey!: How Jewish History, Culture and Values Shaped the Comic Book Superhero. Baltimore: Leviathan Press. pp. 75–76. ISBN 978-1-881927-32-7.

=== London publisher ===
- Papadopoulos, Stephanos (2001). Lost Days. Leviathan Press (UK), Rattapallax Press (NY). ISBN 1-903563-07-0.
