= Household Ghosts =

1961 novel by James Kennaway

- First edition
- Author: James Kennaway
- Language: English
- Genre: Drama
- Publisher: Longman
- Publication date: 1961
- Publication place: United Kingdom
- Media type: Print

Household Ghosts is a 1961 novel by the British writer James Kennaway. It portrays the intense relationship between a brother and sister, members of a declining upper-class family in rural Perthshire.

== Adaptation ==
In 1970 it was made into the film Country Dance directed by J. Lee Thompson and starring Peter O'Toole and Susannah York.

== Bibliography ==
- Goble, Alan. The Complete Index to Literary Sources in Film. Walter de Gruyter, 1999.
- Watson, Roderick. The Literature of Scotland: The Twentieth Century. Macmillan, 2006.
