= Up, Up and Away =

Up, Up and Away may refer to:

== Music ==
=== Albums ===
- Up, Up and Away (The 5th Dimension album), 1967
- Up, Up and Away (Johnny Mathis album), 1967
- Up, Up and Away (Sonny Criss album), 1967

=== Songs ===
- "Up, Up and Away" (song), written by Jimmy Webb; first recorded by the 5th Dimension, 1967
- "Up, Up and Away", by Blush from Shake It Up: Live 2 Dance
- "Up Up and Away", by Juice WRLD from Legends Never Die
- "Up Up & Away", by Kid Cudi from Man on the Moon: The End of Day
- "Up Up and Away", by Lil Wayne from Tha Carter IV

== Television ==
- "Up Up and Away", an episode of the TV series Pocoyo

== Other uses ==
- Up, Up and Away (film), a 2000 Disney film
- "Superman: Up, Up and Away!", a 2006 Superman comics story arc
- "Up, up and away", the home run call of baseball announcer Dave Van Horne

== See also ==
- "Stuck Up, Up, and Away", an episode of The Powerpuff Girls
- Up, Up and Oy Vey, a 2006 book by Rabbi Simcha Weinstein
