= The Cost of Living Like This =

First US edition (publ. Atheneum)

The Cost of Living Like This is a novel by Scottish writer James Kennaway. It was the first of Kennaway's novels to be published following his death in a car accident in 1968.

The novel tells the story of Julian, a 38-year-old British government economist who has learned he has terminal lung cancer. As his marriage comes under increasing strain, he begins an extra-marital relationship with his office junior, seventeen-year-old Sally Cohen.

The theme of a love triangle also features in Kennaway's previous novel, Some Gorgeous Accident (1967), which had been inspired by Kennaway's wife's affair with John Le Carré.
