= Hollywood Book Festival =

- Genre: Literary festival
- Locations: Hollywood, California, United States
- Founded: 2006
- Website: hollywoodbookfest.com

The Hollywood Book Festival is an annual book festival in Hollywood, Los Angeles, California. It honors books that deserve more attention from television, video gaming, and multimedia communities. The book festival is one of the only publishing festivals geared toward adapting print into different media. The Hollywood Book Festival includes an awards ceremony and a daytime festival. It has been commemorated since the year 2006.

== History ==
One part of the 2006 festival was a reading by author, actress, and musician Pamela Des Barres, known for her top-selling book, I’m With The Band.

Winners from 2006 festival include Up, Up and Oy Vey by Simcha Weinstein, a study of how Jewish creators influenced the creation of superheroes, that won the non-fiction category; Marcello The Movie Mouse, by Liz Hockinson and Kathryn Otoshi, a tale of a furry fan of flicks and the winner of the children's book category; and My Sister's Wedding, by Hannah R. Goodman, winner of the teenage book category.

The 2007 Hollywood Book Festival grand prize winner was Will Clarke's The Worthy: A Ghost's Story. The award was presented by author/actress Michelle Dominguez Greene on Saturday, July 28 at Barnsdall Art Park in Hollywood. The event featured author readings, vendor booths, clowns, face-painting, live music, book publishing panels and book signings.

The 2008 Hollywood Book Festival was held on July 11–12 at The Grove at Farmers Market.

In 2020 and 2021, the festival was held virtually on Zoom, which was the first time the festival was not held in person.

In 2021, the Hollywood Book Festival honored books worth of further attention from the film, television, and multimedia industries.

In 2022, the Hollywood Book Festival considered published, self-published and independent publisher non-fiction, fiction, children's, and young adult's books.

== Grand prize recipients ==
- 2013: Jonathan Womack for his sci-fi novel A Cry for a Hero
