= Petrou =

Petrou (Greek: Πέτρου) is a Greek surname. People with this surname include:

- David Michael Petrou, American film producer
- George Petrou, Greek conductor, pianist and director
- Ioannis Petrou (born 1996), Greek rower
- Karen Shaw Petrou (1953–2026), Financial policy analyst
- Kostas Petrou (born 1959), British boxer
- Laurie Petrou, Canadian author and professor
- Maria Petrou (1953–2012), Greek-born British AI researcher
- Nicolas Petrou (born 1967), Cypriot-American fashion designer and couturier
- Sokratis Petrou (born 1979), Greek footballer
- Soulla Petrou (born 1964), British photographer
- Thomas Petrou, American internet personality
