= Scruggs =

Scruggs is a surname, typically of Americans, but also documented in the United Kingdom, several of its other former colonies British descent is especially common, Germany, and (the country of) Georgia.

== Notable people with the surname "Scruggs" include ==
- Burgess E. Scruggs (1860–1934), American physician, civic leader, and alderman from Huntsville, Alabama
- Charles Scruggs of Bone Thugs-n-Harmony, American hip hop band from Cleveland, Ohio
- Chris Scruggs (born 1982), American singer-songwriter
- Earl Scruggs (1924–2012), American musician who perfected and popularized a 3-finger banjo-picking style (now called Scruggs style)
- Edward W. Scruggs (1903–1974), American politician
- Elaine Scruggs (Non-Partisan), mayor of Glendale, Arizona
- Flatt & Scruggs or the Foggy Mountain Boys, bluegrass band founded by Lester Flatt and Earl Scruggs
- Greg Scruggs (born 1990), American football player
- Irene Scruggs (1901–1981), American Piedmont blues and country blues singer, who was also billed as Chocolate Brown and Dixie Nolan
- Jan Scruggs (born 1950), American lawyer
- Joe Scruggs (born 1951), American children's music performer
- Joe E. Scruggs, second head football coach for the Tennessee State University Tigers located in Nashville, Tennessee
- Joseph Scruggs (1888–1964), provincial politician from Alberta, Canada
- Juice Scruggs (born 2000), American football player
- Lauren Scruggs (born 1988), American blogger
- Lawson A. Scruggs (1857–1914), American physician
- Linda Scruggs (born 1964), American HIV/AIDS activist and advocate
- Louise Scruggs (1927–2006), American music manager
- Lucie Johnson Scruggs (1864–1892), African-American writer
- Mary Elfrieda Scruggs or Mary Lou Williams (1910–1981), American jazz pianist, composer, and arranger
- Paul Scruggs (born 1998), American basketball player
- Randy Scruggs (1953–2018), American music producer, songwriter and guitarist
- Richard Scruggs (born 1946), American former A6A naval aviator, a prominent trial lawyer, one of the richest men in Mississippi
- Rick Scruggs (born 1955), American basketball coach
- Ted Scruggs (1923–2000), American football player
- Tony Scruggs (born 1966), former Major League Baseball left fielder
- Uncle John Scruggs (1855–1941), African-American banjo player
- William Lindsay Scruggs (1836–1912), American author, lawyer, and diplomat
- Xavier Scruggs (born 1987), American baseball player

== See also ==
- Creggs
- The Ballad of Buster Scruggs (2018 film)
- Krug (disambiguation)
- Scrag (disambiguation)
- Scroggs (disambiguation)
