= The Mind Benders (novel) =

1963 novel by James Kennaway

- First edition
- Author: James Kennaway
- Language: English
- Genre: Drama
- Publisher: Signet Books
- Publication date: 1963
- Publication place: United Kingdom
- Media type: Print

The Mind Benders is a 1963 novel by the British writer James Kennaway.

It is based on the screenplay he had written for the film The Mind Benders directed by Basil Dearden, which was released the same year.

== Bibliography ==
- Trevor Royle. Macmillan Companion to Scottish Literature. Macmillan, 1984.
