= Silence (Kennaway novel) =

1972 novel by James Kennaway

- First edition
- Author: James Kennaway
- Cover artist: First edition
- Language: English
- Genre: Drama
- Publisher: Jonathan Cape
- Publication date: 1972
- Publication place: United Kingdom
- Media type: Print

Silence is a 1972 novel by the British writer James Kennaway. His last novel, it was published posthumously.

== Bibliography ==
- Trevor Royle. Macmillan Companion to Scottish Literature. Macmillan, 1984.
