= Tunes of Glory (novel) =

1956 novel by James Kennaway

- First edition (UK)
- Author: James Kennaway
- Language: English
- Genre: Drama
- Publisher: Putnam (UK); Harper & Brothers (US)
- Publication date: 1956
- Publication place: United Kingdom
- Media type: Print

Tunes of Glory is a 1956 novel by the Scottish writer James Kennaway. It portrays the peacetime tensions in a Highland regiment shortly after the Second World War.

== Adaptation ==
In 1960 it was made into the film Tunes of Glory directed by Ronald Neame and starring Alec Guinness and John Mills, with Kennaway adapting his own novel for the screenplay.

== Bibliography ==
- Goble, Alan. The Complete Index to Literary Sources in Film. Walter de Gruyter, 1999.
- Watson, Roderick. The Literature of Scotland: The Twentieth Century. Macmillan, 2006.
