= The Bells of Shoreditch =

1963 novel by James Kennaway

- First edition
- Author: James Kennaway
- Language: English
- Genre: Drama
- Publisher: Longman
- Publication date: 1963
- Publication place: United Kingdom
- Media type: Print

The Bells of Shoreditch is a novel by the British writer James Kennaway. It set in the morally corrupting world of merchant banking in the City of London.

== Bibliography ==
- Trevor Royle. Macmillan Companion to Scottish Literature. Macmillan, 1984.
