= The Greengage Summer =

1961 British film by Lewis Gilbert

- Movie poster
- Directed by: Lewis Gilbert
- Written by: Rumer Godden (novel); Howard Koch (adaptation)
- Produced by: Edward Small (executive); Victor Saville
- Starring: Kenneth More; Danielle Darrieux; Susannah York
- Cinematography: Freddie Young
- Music by: Richard Addinsell
- Production companies: PKL Productions; Victor Saville-Edward Small Productions
- Distributed by: Columbia Pictures
- Release dates: 4 April 1961 (World premiere, London, UK); 1 May 1961 (UK general release); 20 September 1961 (US)
- Running time: 99 minutes
- Country: United Kingdom
- Language: English

The Greengage Summer (called Loss of Innocence in the U.S.) is a 1961 British drama film directed by Lewis Gilbert and starring Kenneth More and Susannah York (in her first leading role). It was based on the novel The Greengage Summer (1958) by Rumer Godden. Set in Épernay, in the Champagne region of France, it is the story of the transition of a teenage girl into womanhood.

More later named it as his favourite film, stating, "Susannah York was just twenty-one and an adorable creature... it was one of the happiest films on which I have ever worked."

== Plot ==
Joss Grey, a 16-year-old English girl, finds herself responsible for the care of her three younger siblings on a summer holiday in France when their mother is suddenly taken ill and rushed to the hospital. When they go to the Hotel Oeillets, proprietress Mademoiselle Zisi does not want the responsibility of unchaperoned children, but her enigmatic English lover Eliot persuades her to accept them. As the days pass, she wishes she had stuck to her original impulse; she becomes increasingly jealous of the attention Eliot pays to the children—especially to Joss.

Meanwhile, hotel employee Paul becomes suspicious of Eliot, snoops in his room, and finds a pistol. Eliot catches Paul and gets Zisi to fire him, but Joss's 13-year-old sister Hester has taken a liking to Paul and begs Joss to get Eliot to reconsider, which he does. But later he becomes angry when Hester takes his picture. Then he rushes out of a tour of caves where champagne is stored to avoid famous guest Monsieur Renard, the best policeman in France. He also insists on turning away potential guests.

Tensions come to a boiling point when Zisi throws a glass of champagne in her rival's face. Eliot chases after her, saying—within Joss's hearing—that she is only a child. Learning from a newspaper article that Eliot is a notorious jewel thief, the outraged Joss mails Hester's photo of him to the police.

Eliot has already decided to leave. He sneaks out late at night, but, on hearing a drunken Paul attack Joss in her bedroom on the second floor, he rushes up to her room. He punches Paul, who then tries to climb down a drainpipe, but the pipe breaks and Paul falls to his death. Eliot tells everyone not to call the police. A remorseful Joss confesses to Eliot that she has denounced him to the police. At her request, he gives her a grownup kiss. Then he disposes of Paul's body and disappears.

While Renard is questioning the uncooperative children the next morning, their solicitor uncle, Mr Bullock, arrives. He has been summoned by an unsigned telegram to extricate them. From the source of the message, Renard realizes that it is from Eliot and that he is trying to escape across the border to Germany on a river barge. Renard explains that Eliot is now also suspected of murdering Paul, but Joss states he died in an accident after trying to escape from her room. With it now almost certain that the police will capture Eliot attempting to escape via the river barge, Hester breaks down in tears and is consoled by her uncle, while Joss walks away alone from the hotel down a country lane.

== Cast ==
- Kenneth More as Eliot
- Danielle Darrieux as Mademoiselle Zisi
- Susannah York as Joss Grey
- Claude Nollier as Madame Corbet, the hotel manager
- Jane Asher as Hester Grey
- Elizabeth Dear as Vicky Grey, the youngest sister
- Richard Williams as Wilmouse Grey, the young brother
- David Saire as Paul
- Raymond Gérôme as Police Inspector Renard
- Maurice Denham as Uncle William
- André Maranne as M. Dufour
- Harold Kasket as M. Prideaux
- Jacques B. Brunius as M. Joubert
- Joy Shelton as Mrs Grey
- Bessie Love as American tourist

== Production ==
The film was a co-production between Victor Saville and Edward Small for United Artists. It was meant to be one of several the two made together, a never-filmed adaptation of The Mousetrap intended to be another, with the third being Legacy of a Spy. Cary Grant was the original choice for the male lead. However, the film was eventually set up at Columbia.

According to Lewis Gilbert, Victor Saville sent the script to Kenneth More before him.

More later wrote that Lewis Gilbert insisted he go on a diet before making the film in order that he might be more believable as a romantic lead. More did so as he very badly wanted to star in the movie.

Hayley Mills was originally offered a lead role. Gilbert says his wife saw Susannah York on stage in a production of The Crucible. This led to her being auditioned and she was given the role.

Filming started 29 August 1960 at Shepperton Studios.

== Reception ==
The film premiered on 5 April 1961 at the Odeon Leicester Square in London's West End. Reviews were positive. Variety called it a "leisurely, romantic drama."

Kinematograph Weekly called it a "money maker" at the British box office in 1961.

Gilbert said the film "got extraordinarily good notices" but "didn't do what it should have" at the box office although "it didn't do badly." He later argued films about a young girl in love with an older man did not work at the box office such as Love in the Afternoon.

Lewis Gilbert thought Kenneth More was miscast. "He was somehow too normal, it didn't quite work; that's a role Dirk [Bogarde] should have played because you could well imagine a girl of fifteen or sixteen falling in love with Dirk." It was the last film More and Gilbert made together after several successful collaborations.

Susannah York also felt that, though she "loved" the movie "I didn't think that was a totally successful film. I always felt that Dirk Bogarde was the person for the Kenneth More role. It needed someone with a touch of dark mystery and Dirk would have been perfect." (York and Bogarde did eventually appear together some years later in the spy comedy-drama Sebastian, released in 1968).
