= Country Dance (film) =

1970 British drama by J. Lee Thompson

- Directed by: J. Lee Thompson
- Written by: James Kennaway
- Based on: Household Ghosts by James Kennaway
- Produced by: Robert Emmett Ginna Jr.
- Starring: Peter O'Toole; Susannah York; Michael Craig
- Cinematography: Ted Moore
- Edited by: Willy Kemplen
- Music by: John Addison
- Production company: Metro-Goldwyn-Mayer
- Distributed by: Metro-Goldwyn-Mayer
- Release date: 22 April 1970
- Running time: 112 minutes
- Country: United Kingdom
- Language: English
- Budget: $3 million

Country Dance (U.S. title: Brotherly Love ) is a 1970 British drama film directed by J. Lee Thompson and starring Peter O'Toole, Susannah York and Michael Craig. It is based on the novel Household Ghosts (1961) by James Kennaway which became a three-act stage play in 1967.

The film's sets were designed by the art director Maurice Fowler. Shooting took place in Perthshire and County Wicklow.

== Plot ==
In a fading Scottish aristocratic family, the drunken Sir Charles Henry Arbuthnot Pinkerton Ferguson has an incestuous relationship with his equally eccentric sister Hilary Dow.

== Cast ==
- Peter O'Toole as Sir Charles Ferguson
- Susannah York as Hilary Dow
- Michael Craig as Douglas Dow
- Harry Andrews as Brigadier Crieff
- Cyril Cusack as Dr. Maitland
- Judy Cornwell as Rosie
- Brian Blessed as Jack Baird
- Robert Urquhart as Auctioneer
- Mark Malicz as Benny-the-Pole
- Jean Anderson as Matron
- Lennox Milne as Miss Mailer
- Helena Gloag as Auntie Belle

== Production ==
The stage play version played at the Edinburgh Festival in 1967. James Kennard wrote the female lead with Susannah York in mind; she was a cousin. Edward Fox played the male lead on stage.

In December 1968, James Kennaway, author of the novel, was driving home from a meeting with Peter O'Toole to discuss the film version when he died in a car accident.

In February 1969, it was announced that O'Toole would make the film with Susannah York under the direction of J. Lee Thompson.

Filming took place in Ireland in mid 1969. York said: "it was the happiest film experience of my life". O'Toole drank heavily through the shoot and at one stage was arrested. Brian Blessed recalled it as "a delightful experience" but admits O'Toole could be difficult.

At one point the film was called The Same Skin; then, it was changed to Brotherly Love.

In April 1970, producer Robert Emmett Ginna Jr. announced that he would make another film with O'Toole and Thompson from a Kennaway novel, The Cost of Living Like This, but it was never made.

== Reception ==
The Monthly Film Bulletin wrote: "The late James Kennaway set this tortuous tragi-comedy of brotherly love in his native Perthshire; director J. Lee Thompson has taken the opportunity to illustrate the reams of extravagant dialogue with stolid, pastoral views of the neighbourhood (and, as it turned out, Ireland, which often and unaccountably deputises for the real thing). Country Dance only gets down to brass tacks in a swift reference to something disgusting and unspecified which happened in the granary many years ago, and in the pallid confession in the last reel. The rest of the film, which catalogues Pink's whimsical last stand to preserve the remaining shreds of his aristocracy while he crumbles into insanity (the usual wages of incest), is a depressingly crude and rambling affair, with Peter O'Toole giving of his all to match the more floridly aphoristic passages of the script, and Susannah York gamely tagging along behind. Only the brief open-air country dance sequence (which exists simply to counterpoint the principals' danse macabre) affords any pleasure".

== Bibliography ==
- Steve Chibnall. J. Lee Thompson. Manchester University Press, 2000.
