= Helena Gloag =

Scottish actress (1909–1973)

Helena Gloag (23 February 1909 – 15 June 1973) was a Scottish actress.

She had roles in films such as The Prime of Miss Jean Brodie, Ring of Bright Water, Country Dance, Scrooge and My Ain Folk.

== Theatre ==
Year	Title	Role	Company	Director	Notes
1948	Ane Satyre of the Thrie Estaites	Tailor's wife	The Glasgow Citizen's Theatre	Tyrone Guthrie, Moultrie Kelsall	play by Sir David Lyndsay, adapted by Robert Kemp

== Partial filmography ==
Year	Title	Role	Notes
1969	The Prime of Miss Jean Brodie	Miss Kerr	
1969	Ring of Bright Water	Flora	
1970	Country Dance	Auntie Belle	
1970	Scrooge	2nd Woman Debtor	
1972	My Childhood	Father's Mother	
1973	My Ain Folk	Father's Mother	(final film role)

== Television ==
Year	Title	Role	Director	Production	Notes
1959	The Other Dear Charmer	Mary Nimmo	Pharic Maclaren	BBC Scotland	play by Robert Kemp
