= A Christmas Carol (1984 film) =

1984 US television film directed by Clive Donner

- 1984 poster
- Genre: Drama; Family; Fantasy
- Based on: A Christmas Carol by Charles Dickens
- Screenplay by: Roger O. Hirson
- Directed by: Clive Donner
- Starring: George C. Scott; Frank Finlay; David Warner; Susannah York; Edward Woodward; Roger Rees; Liz Smith
- Music by: Nick Bicât
- Countries of origin: United Kingdom; United States
- Original language: English

Production
- Executive producer: Robert E. Fuisz
- Producers: George F. Storke; Alfred R. Kelman
- Production locations: Shrewsbury, Shropshire, England
- Cinematography: Tony Imi
- Editor: Peter Tanner
- Running time: 100 minutes
- Production company: Entertainment Partners Ltd.

Original release
- Network: CBS
- Release: 17 December 1984

A Christmas Carol is a 1984 Christmas fantasy television film adapted from Charles Dickens' novella A Christmas Carol (1843). The film was directed by Clive Donner, who was an editor of the 1951 film Scrooge, and stars George C. Scott as Ebenezer Scrooge. It also features Frank Finlay as Marley's Ghost, David Warner as Bob Cratchit, Susannah York as Mrs. Cratchit, Angela Pleasence as the Ghost of Christmas Past, Edward Woodward as the Ghost of Christmas Present and Roger Rees as Scrooge's nephew Fred; Rees also narrates portions of Charles Dickens' words at the beginning and end of the film. It was filmed in the historic medieval county town of Shrewsbury in Shropshire.

The film has received significantly positive reviews, with general praise going to the sets, soundtrack, cinematography, and the performances of the cast, particularly Scott's portrayal of Scrooge, with many critics and reviewers considering it one of the best adaptions of the novel.

== Plot ==
On Christmas Eve in Victorian-era London, greedy commodities trader and financier Ebenezer Scrooge does not tolerate the revelry of Christmas, much less comprehend its meaning. He declines his nephew Fred's invitation for Christmas dinner and reluctantly grants his underpaid clerk Bob Cratchit's request to have Christmas off as there will be no business during the day. Scrooge later charges three businessmen extra for corn, due to failing to meet his demands the previous day, much to their chagrin. Scrooge then declines to give a donation to charity workers Poole and Hacking, saying that the poor are better off dead.

That night, Scrooge is visited by the ghost of his seven-year-dead former business partner Jacob Marley, who warns him to repent his miserly ways, lest he be condemned to the same afterlife as that of Marley's: wandering the Earth for eternity while carrying chains forged from his own greed, forced to witness what he could not share in life. Before departing, Marley tells Scrooge that three spirits will haunt him that night.

At one o'clock, the first spirit — the Ghost of Christmas Past — takes Scrooge back in time to his lonely childhood. As a boy, Scrooge is deserted at boarding school by his father Silas who held a grudge against Ebenezer, as the latter's mother died giving birth to him. Silas gets Ebenezer an apprenticeship with the benevolent Mr. Fezziwig, after three days to spend with his loving elder sister Fan, Fred's late mother. Scrooge is eventually engaged to Belle, but his love for her gradually withers as he becomes obsessed with financial security after Silas' death. The Spirit shows Belle on the Christmas Eve that Marley died as a happily married mother. When Belle expresses pity for Scrooge's loneliness, he angrily extinguishes the spirit with her cap and re-appears in his bedroom.

At two o'clock, the Ghost of Christmas Present shows Scrooge the joys of the holiday. At the Cratchit residence, they find Bob's family content with their small dinner. The spirit explains that Tim, Bob's crippled son, will die if the future remains unaltered. Scrooge is taken to Fred's house for the party which Scrooge declined to attend. Fred still wants to pursue a relationship with Scrooge for the sake of Fan; Ebenezer is touched by this. The spirit then takes Scrooge to a tunnel where homeless families are camped. There, he presents to Scrooge two malnourished children, Ignorance and Want, and warns Scrooge to beware of them. The ghost then disappears, abandoning a distraught Scrooge.

The Ghost of Christmas Yet to Come arrives and shows Scrooge a group of businessmen discussing the death of a colleague, whose funeral they will attend only so they can eat a free lunch. Scrooge is transported to his own bedroom, where a dead man lies under a shroud. Scrooge does not lift the sheet but demands to be shown emotion over the man's death; the spirit shows him the man's servants gleefully selling his possessions to a fence. Scrooge complains that he was shown only greed and avarice, demanding to see tenderness instead. He is transported to the Cratchit house, where Bob and his family mourn the recent death of Tim - who has succumbed to his illness. Distraught, Scrooge asks to be taken home but is instead taken to a cemetery. When he asks who the dead man in his bedroom was, the ghost points to a neglected, snow-covered grave. Scrooge wipes the snow away to see that the tombstone bears his own name; overcome with despair, he begs for his life and swears to change before realizing that the spirit has faded and he is still asleep in his room.

Awakening as sunlight breaks, and discovering that it is Christmas Day, a gleeful Scrooge anonymously sends the Cratchits a prize-winning turkey for dinner. Offering Christmas wishes among London's citizens, he makes a large donation to Poole and Hacking. Fred is delighted when Ebenezer accepts the invitation to dinner and reconciles with him. The next day, Scrooge plays a prank on Bob; pretending to be about to fire him for lateness, Ebenezer instead doubles Bob's salary. Scrooge comes to treat everyone around him with kindness and generosity and becomes a second father to Tim (who recovers and does not die), embodying the Christmas spirit.

== Cast ==
Frank Finlay as Marley's ghost

- George C. Scott – Ebenezer Scrooge
  - Mark Strickson – Young Ebenezer Scrooge
- Frank Finlay – Jacob Marley
- Angela Pleasence – Ghost of Christmas Past
- Edward Woodward – Ghost of Christmas Present
- Michael Carter – Ghost of Christmas Yet to Come
- David Warner – Bob Cratchit
- Susannah York – Mrs. Cratchit
- the Cratchit Offspring:
  - Anthony Walters – Timothy "Tiny Tim" Cratchit
  - Louise Gasser – Martha Cratchit
  - Orlando Wells (Susannah York's real-life son) – Michael Cratchit
  - Nancy Dodds – Nancy Cratchit
  - Sasha Wells (Susannah York's real-life daughter) – Belinda Cratchit
  - Kieran Hughes – Peter Cratchit
- Roger Rees – Fred Holywell/Narrator
- Caroline Langrishe – Janet Holywell, Fred's wife
- Lucy Gutteridge – Belle, Scrooge's fiancée
- Nigel Davenport – Silas Scrooge, Ebenezer and Fan's father
- Joanne Whalley – Fan Holywell, Ebenezer's sister and Fred's mother
- Timothy Bateson – Mr. Fezziwig
- Michael Gough – Mr. Poole
- John Quarmby – Mr. Hacking
- Peter Woodthorpe – Joe the Fence
- Liz Smith – Mrs. Dilber
- John Sharp – Mr. Tipton
- Derek Francis – Mr. Pemberton
- Danny Davies – Forbush
- Brian Pettifer – Ben (homeless father)
- Catherine Hall – Meg (homeless mother)
- Cathryn Harrison – Kate
- Daniel Chatto - William

Cast notes:

- Michael Gough voiced Scrooge in a BBC Radio production, broadcast on BBC Radio 4 on 22 December 1990, with Timothy Bateson reprising his role as Fezziwig.
- Liz Smith reprised the role of Mrs. Dilber in the 1999 film of A Christmas Carol starring Patrick Stewart, and played Joyce in the 2000 film, which starred Ross Kemp as a modern-day Scrooge.

== Production ==
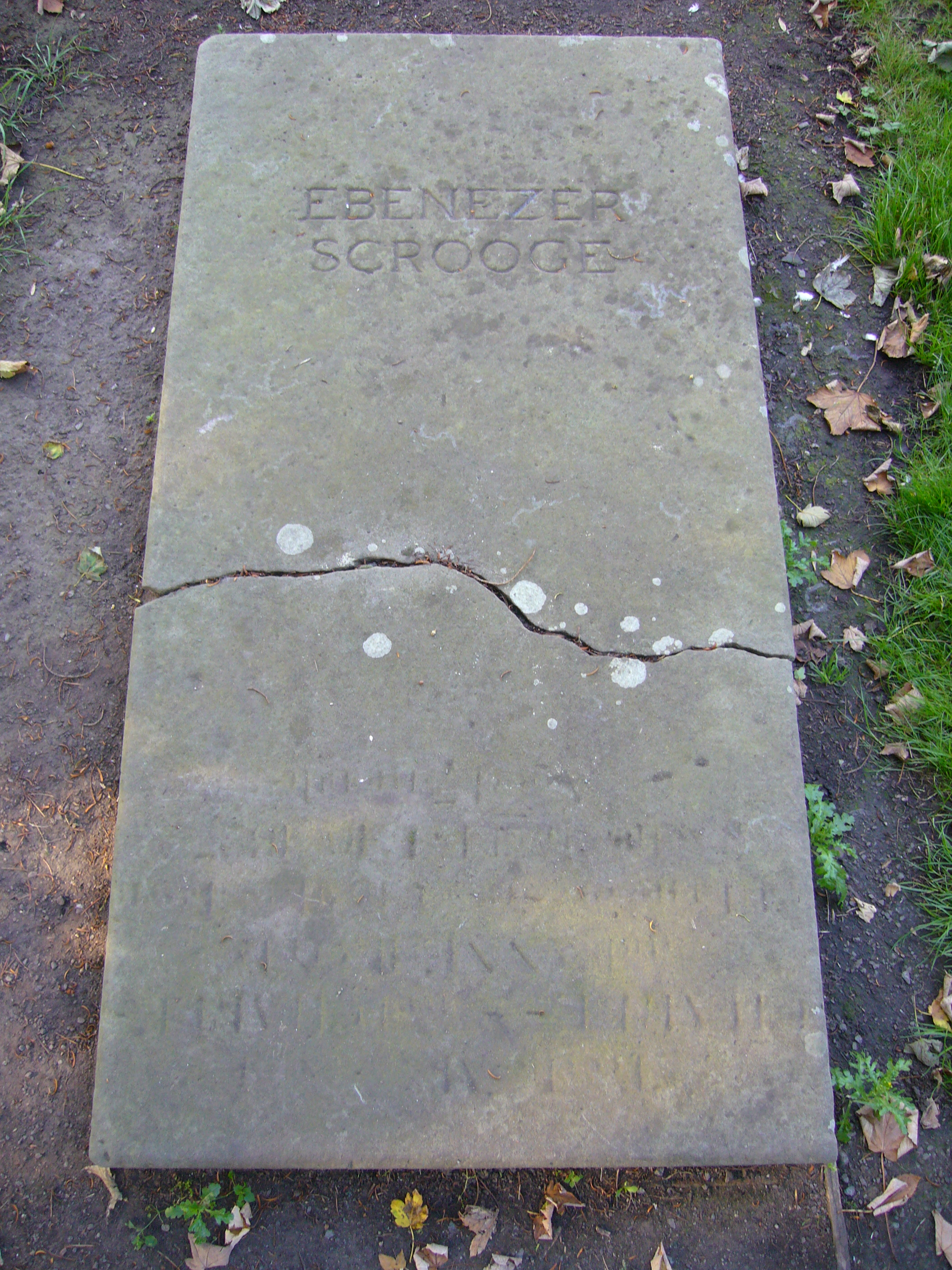
Tombstone prop from the graveyard scene still in situ at the churchyard of St Chad's Church, Shrewsbury (pictured in 2008). The stone was vandalised in November 2024 but was restored for free by local stonemasons "in the spirit of the film."

Director Clive Donner was the editor of Scrooge, the 1951 adaptation of A Christmas Carol starring Alastair Sim. Donner's A Christmas Carol was filmed on location in Shrewsbury, Shropshire, in the English Midlands. It originally aired on the American television network CBS on 17 December 1984, and was released theatrically in Great Britain. The film appeared on TF1 Television in France on Christmas Day. The U.S. debut was sponsored by IBM, which purchased all of the commercial spots for the two-hour premiere. The film brought in a 20.7/30 rating/share, winning its time slot and ranking No. 10 for the week. The film was marketed with the tagline "A new powerful presentation of the most loved ghost story of all time!"

=== Comparison with the source material ===
Rather than being a simple miser, Scrooge is more of a ruthless businessman who laughs when he mocks Christmas, and even tries to make excuses to defend his actions during his encounters with the Spirits. The interactions of the two charity benefactors, named as Poole and Hacking in this adaptation, occur at the London Stock Exchange, rather than in the office as in the book. A ghostly hearse that Scrooge sees in the book going up his staircase after he sees Marley's face on his doorknocker happens outside on the street and becomes the hearse that carried Marley's body. Marley's ghost, although initially transparent (as in the book), solidifies when he enters the room. Scrooge's mother is established as having died giving birth to him, causing his father to bear him a grudge. His father still resents him as he moves him to Fezziwig's after only three days back.

== Home media ==
A Christmas Carol has run in syndication on local American channels since its debut in 1984, and was released on VHS in 1989 (in the UK) and to DVD in 1999. This was because Scott himself (and later his estate through Baxter Healthcare, to whom the Scott family donated their copyright) owned the rights to this film. On 25 November 2007, it returned to national television on AMC for the first time since its original broadcast, and the network continues to show it each December under license from the Scott estate and 20th Century Studios/Walt Disney Television (the latter's distribution rights as the result of their owning the video rights). In 2009, the Hallmark Channel also ran the film soon after Thanksgiving. The same year, the film was re-released on DVD by Fox, with updated box art but the same menu and features as the previous DVD release. Fox released it on Blu-ray in December 2010.

== Reception ==
The film earned high Nielsen ratings, ranking 10th out of 65 shows airing the week of December 17–23, 1984, with a 20.7 household rating and a 30 percent audience share.

The film remains among the most beloved of the many adaptations of A Christmas Carol. John J. O'Connor of the New York Times gave a positive review, praising the cinematography, production sets and the performances (especially Scott). Scott was nominated for an Emmy for Outstanding Lead Actor in a Limited Series or a Special for his portrayal of Scrooge. In 2009, novelist and essayist Louis Bayard, writing for Salon.com, labelled the adaptation "the definitive version of a beloved literary classic", praising its fidelity to Dickens' original story, production sets, the strength of the supporting cast, and especially Scott's performance as Scrooge.

In 2019, Robert Keeling of Den of Geek praised Scott's performance and the adaptation's expansions from the book. He praises the supporting cast but felt Past to be "possibly the most '80s ghost imaginable" and felt that Tiny Tim was "incredibly annoying" and noted that for the character "to make look sicker, they have clearly just put dark make-up round his eyes. It makes him look like a bit like a child zombie more than anything. Nevertheless, it's one of the most comprehensive adaptations of Dickens' work on offer, and is elevated considerably by Scott's marvellous performance." In 2023, Tom Nichols of The Atlantic wrote, "There are some good adaptations of the Charles Dickens' classic A Christmas Carol, and many bad ones, but only one truly great version, and it is the 1984 made-for-television movie starring George C. Scott." Nichols celebrated Scott's portrayal of Scrooge as "a barrel-chested bully, an imposing and nasty piece of work." He also praised the film's "attention to detail and atmosphere", and the "deeply unsettling apparitions", especially Frank Finlay as Marley's ghost and Edward Woodward as Christmas Present.

Aggregate site Rotten Tomatoes gave the film a fresh 98% rating based on 50 reviews, with the consensus reading "A Christmas Carol stands out as a beautifully atmospheric, faithfully Dickensian adaptation whose suspense, warmth, and richly shaded Scrooge make it a strong contender for the definitive screen version."

== See also ==
- List of Christmas films
- List of ghost films
- Adaptations of A Christmas Carol
