= James Kennaway =

Scottish novelist and screenwriter (1928–1968)

- Born: 5 June 1928; Auchterarder, Scotland
- Died: 21 December 1968 (aged 40); England
- Occupation: Writer
- Years active: 1945–1968

James Peebles Ewing Kennaway (5 June 1928 – 21 December 1968) was a Scottish novelist and screenwriter. He was born in Auchterarder in Perthshire and attended Glenalmond College.

== Biography ==
Born to a middle class family in Auchterarder, his father was a lawyer who died when Kennaway was 12 years old. His mother was a doctor. He attended Cargilfield Preparatory School in Edinburgh from the age of 8. He was later head boy. He then attended Glenalmond College. At the age of 18, Kennaway was called up for two years of National Service, initially serving with his father's World War I regiment, the Black Watch, and then with the Queen's Own Cameron Highlanders. He was commissioned into the 1st Battalion of the Gordon Highlanders.

After National Service, James attended Trinity College, Oxford to study Politics, Philosophy and Economics (1948). There he met his future wife, Susan Edmonds and married her in 1951. Their son is the author Guy Kennaway and his daughter was the frontwoman for the pop band Jane Kennaway & Strange Behaviour who had a minor hit with 'IOU' in 1981.

== Career ==
His best known novel was his first, Tunes of Glory (1956), which was turned into a well-known film of the same name starring Alec Guinness and John Mills. Kennaway also wrote the screenplay. It was a realistic work, set in the army just after the Second World War, and drawing to some extent on Kennaway's own experiences. This was not typical of his later output, some of which was more experimental in nature.

His other works were the short story "The Dollar Bottom in Lilliput" filmed in 1981 as The Dollar Bottom winning an Academy Award. He wrote the novels Household Ghosts (1961) adapted as a feature film entitled Country Dance (1970), The Mindbenders (1963) based on his screenplay of the film of the same name, The Bells of Shoreditch (1963), Some Gorgeous Accident (1967), The Cost of Living like This (1969) and Silence (1972) – the final two works were posthumous.

A stage adaptation of Some Gorgeous Accident was presented at the Assembly Rooms as part of the Edinburgh Festival Fringe in August 2010.

He was also a successful screenwriter. His films include Violent Playground (1958), Tunes of Glory (1960), The Mind Benders (1963) and Battle of Britain (1969).

Kennaway died of a heart attack while driving home to Lechlade, Gloucestershire from London at the age of 40.

== See also ==
- Scottish literature
