= Tunes of Glory =

1960 British film by Ronald Neame

- theatrical poster
- Directed by: Ronald Neame
- Screenplay by: James Kennaway
- Based on: Tunes of Glory; 1956 novel by James Kennaway
- Produced by: Colin Lesslie
- Starring: Alec Guinness; John Mills
- Cinematography: Arthur Ibbetson
- Edited by: Anne V. Coates
- Music by: Malcolm Arnold
- Production company: Knightsbridge Films
- Distributed by: United Artists; Lopert Pictures (US)
- Release date: 4 September 1960 (Venice Film Festival)
- Running time: 106 minutes
- Country: United Kingdom
- Language: English
- Budget: £267,731

Tunes of Glory is a 1960 British drama film directed by Ronald Neame, starring Alec Guinness and John Mills, featuring Dennis Price, Kay Walsh, John Fraser, Duncan MacRae, Gordon Jackson and Susannah York. It is based on the 1956 novel and screenplay by James Kennaway. The film is a psychological drama focusing on events in a wintry Scottish Highland regimental barracks in the period immediately following the Second World War. Writer Kennaway served with the Gordon Highlanders, and the title refers to the bagpiping that accompanies every important action of the battalion.

== Plot ==
In January 1948, at the officers' mess of a Highland battalion, Jock Sinclair announces his tenure as acting commanding officer is over. Having commanded as an acting lieutenant-colonel since his predecessor was killed in the North African campaign, Lieutenant-colonel Basil Barrow is to replace him. Despite Sinclair's extensive combat experience, brigade headquarters considers Barrow – whose ancestor founded the battalion – a more appropriate peacetime commanding officer.

Colonel Barrow arrives early to find the officers dancing and declines sharing a whisky with Sinclair. Whereas Sinclair enlisted as a piper and rose through the ranks, Barrow joined from Oxford University. He served with the battalion in 1933 and was later a prisoner of the Japanese, whilst Sinclair has only been in Barlinnie Prison for being drunk and disorderly.

Sinclair's daughter, Morag, secretly meets piper Corporal Ian Fraser as Barrow starts to enforce strict battalion discipline. The officers chafe at orders to learn "proper" Scottish country dancing to prepare for the battalion's first official post-war social occasion. Men who have been raucously dancing for decades are insulted and angry at being told not to raise their arms above their heads. The townfolk enjoy the cocktail party hosted by Barrow, but when the dancing becomes rowdy he ends the proceedings and drives off in a jeep, clearly distressed.

Sinclair finds Corporal Fraser with Morag in a pub and punches him. Barrow begins a court-martial process but Sinclair persuades Barrow to back down, promising his support in the future. Sinclair doesn't follow through, and other officers, thinking Barrow weak, avoid him. While playing snooker, Scott tells Barrow that Sinclair is really in charge and suggests that Barrow join the other followers. Distraught, Barrow leaves and a gunshot is heard. Barrow's body is discovered in the washroom with a self-inflicted bullet wound.

Sinclair calls a meeting to announce his plans for a grandiose funeral, complete with a march through the town in which the pipers will play "Tunes of Glory". When one officer points to the manner of Barrow's death, Sinclair insists that it was not suicide, but murder, he being the murderer, with the other senior officers being accomplices. While Sinclair loses himself in his vision of the cortège, everyone leaves except Cairns and Scott. Sinclair buries his head in his Tam o' shanter (cap) and sobs with guilt, after which he is helped from the barracks. Cairns rides with him as he is driven away, with officers and men saluting as he passes and bagpipes playing, as snow begins to fall.

== Cast ==
- Alec Guinness as Major Jock Sinclair, DSO, MM
- John Mills as Lieutenant-colonel Basil Barrow
- Dennis Price as Major Charles "Charlie" Scott, MC & Bar
- Kay Walsh as Mary Titterington
- John Fraser as Corporal Piper Ian Fraser
- Susannah York as Morag Sinclair
- Gordon Jackson as Captain Jimmy Cairns, MC
- Duncan MacRae as Pipe Major Maclean
- Percy Herbert as regimental sergeant major Riddick
- Allan Cuthbertson as Captain Eric Simpson
- Paul Whitsun-Jones as Major "Dusty" Miller
- Gerald Harper as Major Hugo MacMillan
- Richard Leech as Captain Alec Rattray
- Peter McEnery as 2nd Lieutenant David MacKinnon
- Keith Faulkner as Corporal Piper Adam
- Angus Lennie as Orderly Room Clerk
- John Harvey as Sergeant Finney
- Andrew Keir as Lance Corporal Campbell
- Jameson Clark as Sir Alan
- Lockwood West as Provost
- Eric Woodburn as Landlord
- Ray Austin as sergeant (uncredited)

== Production ==
The film was initially to be made at Ealing Studios, with Michael Relph as producer and Jack Hawkins playing Sinclair. At the time that it was at Ealing, Kenneth Tynan, then working as a script reader, criticised the first draft screenplay as having "too much army-worship in it". That view was shared by director Alexander Mackendrick. By the time Kennaway rewrote the script, Ealing had lost interest and Hawkins was no longer available. The film was then picked up by the independent producer Colin Lesslie, who interested Mills in the project.

Accounts differ as to how the leading roles were cast. Mills wrote that he and Guinness "tossed for it", while Guinness recalled that he had originally been offered the role of Barrow but preferred Sinclair. The role of Barrow might have been too close to that of Colonel Nicholson in The Bridge on the River Kwai. Sinclair has been described as "anti-Nicholson".

Tunes of Glory was filmed at Shepperton Studios in London. The sets were designed by the art director Wilfred Shingleton. Establishing location shots were done at Stirling Castle in Stirling, Scotland. Stirling Castle is the Regimental Headquarters of the Argyll and Sutherland Highlanders but, in fact, James Kennaway served with the Gordon Highlanders. Although the production was initially offered broad co-operation to film within the castle from the commanding officer there, as long as it didn't disrupt the regiment's routine, but, after seeing a lurid paperback cover for Kennaway's book, that co-operation evaporated, and the production was only allowed to shoot distant exterior shots of the castle.

Director Ronald Neame had worked with Guinness on The Horse's Mouth (1958), and a number of other participants were also involved in both films, including actress Kay Walsh, cinematographer Arthur Ibbetson and editor Anne V. Coates. The film was Susannah York's film debut.

Original music was composed by Malcolm Arnold, who also wrote the music for The Bridge on the River Kwai.

== Box office ==
The film was called a "money maker" at the British box office in 1961.

== Critical reception ==
The film was generally well received by critics, with the acting, in particular, garnering praise.

The Monthly Film Bulletin wrote: "In Tunes of Glory, Ronald Neame and his writer James Kennaway have sketched in the corruptions, tensions and intrigues of life in a Highland Regiment's officers' quarters with enough acerbity to make an interesting melodrama. Unfortunately, one cannot put it higher than that. It is not merely that they have thrown away a good idea on an embarrassingly sentimental ending; they have lowered the temperature throughout by throwing in such irrelevancies as a thread or two of conventionally-handled love interest ... and some stagey exhibitions of quaint humour on the part of the lower ranks. False touches and caricature abound; sympathies switching disconcertingly from side to side as the plot, rather than the disappointingly underdeveloped characters, dictates. Nevertheless, there are good'ish supporting performances from Dennis Price, Gordon Jackson and Duncan MacRae: all the scenes in which Barrow makes his presence newly felt are observed with brisk authority; and the sets are suitably claustrophobic. Although Alec Guinness (made up to look alarmingly like Stan Laurel) can only intermittently suggest a tough, blaspheming old campaigner, John Mills succeeds in establishing the gradual cracking of Barrow's confidence with a nervous conviction not always evident in the parts written."

Writing in Esquire, Dwight Macdonald called Tunes of Glory a "limited but satisfying tale", and wrote that "It is one of those films, like Zinnemann's Sundowners (1960), which are of little interest cinematically and out of fashion themaically (no sex, no violence, no low life) and yet manages to be very good entertainment".

The film was praised by Bosley Crowther of The New York Times, who wrote "Not only do Alec Guinness and John Mills superlatively adorn the two top roles in this drama of professional military men, but also every actor, down to the walk-ons, acquits himself handsomely."

Variety called Ronald Neame's direction "crisp and vigorous", and said that Mills had a "tough assignment" to appear opposite Guinness, "particularly in a fundamentally unsympathetic role, but he is always a match for his co-star".

The film's screenplay, and especially the final scene showing Sinclair's breakdown, was criticised by some critics at the time of release. One critic wrote in Sight & Sound that the ending was "inexcusable" and that the scene is "far less one of tragic remorse than gauchely contrived emotionalism".

Tunes of Glory has a 73% rating on the Rotten Tomatoes review aggregation site.

== Awards and honours ==
James Kennaway, who adapted the screenplay from his novel, was nominated for an Academy Award for Best Adapted Screenplay, but lost to Elmer Gantry. It also received numerous BAFTA nominations, including Best Film, Best British Film, Best British Screenplay and Best Actor nominations for both Guinness and Mills.

The film was the official British entry at the 1960 Venice Film Festival, and John Mills won the Best Actor award there. That same year the film was named "Best Foreign Film" by Hollywood Foreign Press Association.

== Adaptations ==
Tunes of Glory was adapted for BBC Radio 4's Monday Play by B.C. Cummins in April 1976.

It was adapted for the stage by Michael Lunney, who directed a production of it which toured Britain in 2006.

== Home video ==
Tunes of Glory is available on DVD from Criterion and Metrodome. It was released on Blu-ray by Criterion in December 2019 with a 4K digital restoration.

== Legacy ==
Alfred Hitchcock called Tunes of Glory "one of the best films ever made", Neil Sinyard writes in The Cinema of Britain and Ireland, "so it is curious that the film rarely finds a place in the established canon of great British films". It was not included in the list of 100 greatest British films of the century compiled by the British Film Institute in 1999. Sinyard observes that the film came too late to be part of the spate of popular 1950s British war films, and was too dark to be part of that genre. He notes that it seemed "slightly old-fashioned" when compared to British New Wave films that came out at the time, such as Room at the Top.

Tunes of Glory was preserved by the Academy Film Archive in 2018.
