= Shtick Shift =

Book

Book cover - Shtick Shift

Shtick Shift: Jewish Humor in the 21st Century is a book by Rabbi Simcha Weinstein.

The book presents an overview of the approach modern Jewish comedians are taking to their work - brutal, matter-of-fact, and unashamedly Jewish. To contrast the older approach with the newer approach, Weinstein gives examples of the comedy of previous generations of comedians such as Gertrude Berg, Woody Allen, Sid Caesar, and Mel Brooks. He then presents in-depth analysis of the modern crop of Jewish comedic performers, including Jerry Seinfeld, Larry David, Sacha Baron Cohen and Sarah Silverman.

== Table of contents ==
- Put on Your Yarmulke
- Something from Nothing : Jewish Comedy in a New Century
- Jew Gold : Self-fulfilling Stereotypes and Unfulfilling Wealth
- Raising the Bar : Bling Mitzvah
- Beyond Bubbe : The 21st Century Jewish Family
- Fake News, Real Impact
- Seriously Funny : Anti-Semitism and Self-Hatred
- Cool Jew?
