= Susannah York =

English film, stage and television actress (1939–2011)

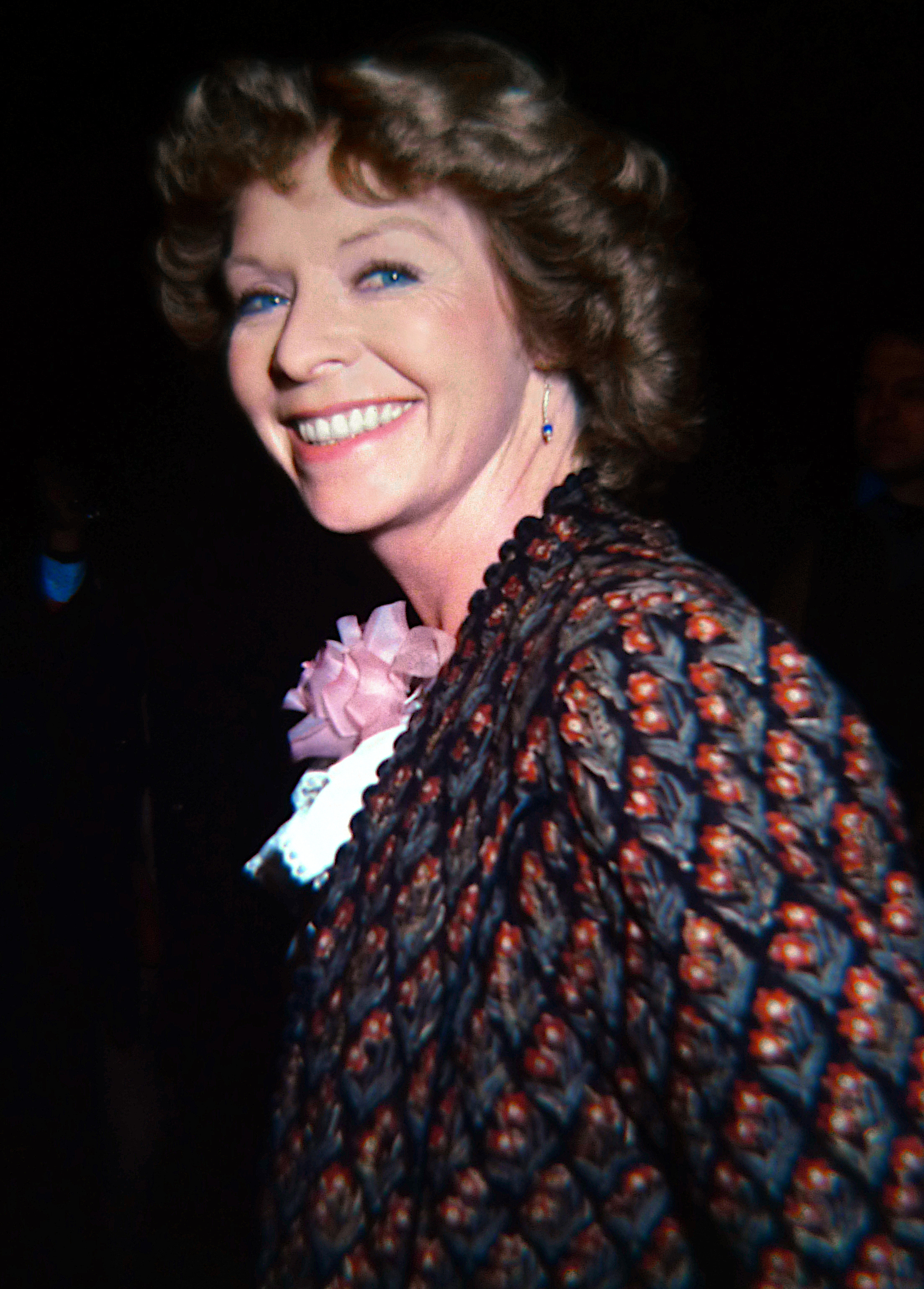
- Born: Susannah Yolande Fletcher; 9 January 1939; Chelsea, London, England
- Died: 15 January 2011 (aged 72); Brompton, London, England
- Education: Royal Academy of Dramatic Art
- Occupation: Actress
- Years active: 1959–2011
- Spouse: Michael Wells (m. 1959; div. 1976)
- Children: 2, including Orlando Wells

Susannah Yolande Fletcher (9 January 1939 – 15 January 2011), known professionally as Susannah York, was an English actress. Her appearances in various films of the 1960s, including Tom Jones (1963) and They Shoot Horses, Don't They? (1969), formed the basis of her international reputation. An obituary in The Telegraph characterised her as "the blue-eyed English rose with the china-white skin and cupid lips who epitomised the sensuality of the swinging sixties", who later "proved that she was a real actor of extraordinary emotional range."

York's early films included The Greengage Summer (1961) and Freud (1962). She received a nomination for the Academy Award for Best Supporting Actress for They Shoot Horses, Don't They? She also won the 1972 Cannes Film Festival Award for Best Actress for Images. Her other film appearances included Sands of the Kalahari (1965), A Man for All Seasons (1966), The Killing of Sister George (1968), Battle of Britain (1969), Jane Eyre (1970), X Y & Zee (1972), Gold (1974), The Maids (1975), Conduct Unbecoming (1975), Eliza Fraser (1976), The Shout (1978), The Silent Partner (1978) and Superman (1978). She was appointed an Officier de L'Ordre des Arts et des Lettres in 1991.

== Early life ==
York was born in Chelsea, London, in 1939, the younger daughter of Simon William Peel Vickers Fletcher (1910–2002), a merchant banker and steel magnate, and his first wife, the former Joan Nita Mary Bowring. They married in 1935, and divorced prior to 1943. Her maternal grandfather was Walter Andrew Bowring, CBE, a British diplomat who served as Administrator of Dominica (1931–1933); she was a great-great-granddaughter of political economist Sir John Bowring. York had an elder sister, as well as a half-brother, Eugene Xavier Charles William Peel Fletcher, from her father's second marriage to Pauline de Bearnez de Morton de La Chapelle.

In early 1943, York's mother married a Scottish businessman, Adam M. Hamilton, and moved, with her daughter, to Scotland. At the age of 11, York entered Marr College in Troon, Ayrshire. Later, she became a boarder at Wispers School in Midhurst, Sussex. At 13, she was removed, effectively expelled, from Wispers after admitting to a nude midnight swim in the school pool, and she transferred to East Haddon Hall School in Northamptonshire.

Enthusiastic about her experiences of acting at school (she had played an ugly sister in Cinderella at the age of nine), York first decided to apply to the Glasgow College of Dramatic Art, but after her mother had separated from her stepfather and moved to London, she instead auditioned for the Royal Academy of Dramatic Art. At RADA, where her classmates included Peter O'Toole, Albert Finney, Tom Courtenay and future Beatles manager Brian Epstein, she won the Ronson award for most promising student before graduating in 1958.

== Career ==
=== Film ===
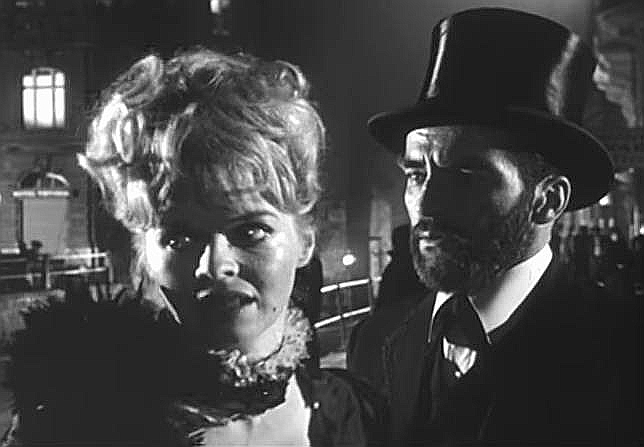
York with Montgomery Clift in Freud: The Secret Passion, 1962

Her film career began with Tunes of Glory (1960), co-starring with Alec Guinness and John Mills. In 1961, she played the leading role in The Greengage Summer, which co-starred Kenneth More and Danielle Darrieux. In 1962, she performed in Freud: The Secret Passion with Montgomery Clift in the title role.

York played Sophie Western opposite Albert Finney in the Oscar-winning Best Film Tom Jones (1963). She had turned the part down three times and only agreed to participate because she felt guilty over cooking a disastrous meal for the director Tony Richardson, who was determined not to accept her refusal. She also appeared in The 7th Dawn (1964) with William Holden, Kaleidescope (1966), A Man for All Seasons (1966), The Killing of Sister George (1968) and Battle of Britain (1969). In 1970 she co-starred with George C. Scott (as Edward Rochester), playing the title role in an American television movie of Jane Eyre, and played opposite Peter O'Toole in Country Dance.

York was nominated for a Best Supporting Actress Oscar for They Shoot Horses, Don't They? (1969). She snubbed the Academy when, regarding her nomination, she declared it offended her to be nominated without being asked. She was highly praised for her performance, though she said "I don't think much of the film, or of myself in it." She did attend the ceremony but lost to Goldie Hawn for her role in Cactus Flower.

In 1972, she won the Best Actress award at the Cannes Film Festival for her role in Images. She played Superman's mother Lara on the doomed planet Krypton in Superman (1978) and its sequels, Superman II (1980) and Superman IV: The Quest for Peace (1987, voice role). York made extensive appearances in British television series, including Prince Regent (1979), as Maria Fitzherbert, the clandestine wife of the future George IV, and We'll Meet Again (1982).

In 1984, York starred as Mrs. Cratchit in A Christmas Carol (1984), based on the novel by Charles Dickens. She again co-starred with George C. Scott (as Ebenezer Scrooge), David Warner (Bob Cratchit), Frank Finlay (Jacob Marley), Angela Pleasence (The Ghost of Christmas Past) and Anthony Walters (Tiny Tim).

In 1992, she was a member of the jury at the 42nd Berlin International Film Festival.

In 1997, York starred as Olivia in the British comedy Loop co-starring with Andy Serkis, based on the script by Tim Pears.

In 2003, York had a recurring role as hospital manager Helen Grant in the BBC1 television drama series Holby City. She reprised this role in two episodes of Holby City's sister series Casualty in May 2004. Her last film was The Calling, released in 2010 in the UK.

She was a patron of the Children's Film Unit and appeared in several of their films.

=== Stage ===
"York's greatest achievement was to escape the pigeonholing that is the curse of her profession and to overcome the perception of her as the flaxen-haired beauty of 1960s British movies. In her richly fulfilled later career, she proved that she was a real actor of extraordinary emotional range, not just a movie star."

— Media critic Michael Billington

In 1978, York appeared on stage at the New End Theatre in London in The Singular Life of Albert Nobbs with Lucinda Childs, directed by French director Simone Benmussa. This was the first of 10 projects she completed with the producer Richard Jackson. The following year, she appeared in Paris, speaking French in a play by Henry James: Appearances, with Sami Frey. The play was again directed by Benmussa.

In the 1980s, again with Benmussa, York played in For No Good Reason, an adaptation of George Moore's short story, with Susan Hampshire. In 1985, she appeared in Fatal Attraction by Bernard Slade at the Theatre Royal Haymarket. In 1986-87, York starred as Mary in Claire Boothe's The Women at the Old Vic, a production that included Maria Aitken, Diana Quick and Georgina Hale.

In 2007, she appeared in the UK tour of The Wings of the Dove, and continued performing her internationally well-received solo show, The Loves of Shakespeare's Women. Also in 2007, she guest starred in the Doctor Who audio play Valhalla. In 2008, she played the part of Nelly in an adaptation by April De Angelis of Wuthering Heights.

According to the website of Italian symphonic metal band Rhapsody of Fire (previously known as Rhapsody), York had been recruited for a narrated part on the band's next full-length album Triumph or Agony. In 2009, she starred alongside Jos Vantyler in the Tennessee Williams season at the New End Theatre, London for which she received critical acclaim.

York's last stage performance was as Jean in Ronald Harwood's Quartet, at the Oxford Playhouse in August 2010.

=== Writing and personal appearances ===
In the 1970s, York wrote two children's fantasy novels, In Search of Unicorns (1973, revised 1984) which was excerpted in the film Images, and Lark's Castle (1976, revised 1986).

She was a guest, along with David Puttnam on the BBC Radio 4 documentary I Had The Misery Thursday, a tribute programme to film actor Montgomery Clift, which was aired in 1986, on the 20th anniversary of Clift's death. York had co-starred with him in Freud: The Secret Passion, John Huston's 1962 film biography of the psychoanalyst.

== Personal life ==
In 1959, York married Michael Wells, with whom she had two children, including Orlando. They divorced in 1976. In the late 1970s, according to an interview in The Sunday Times, she had a two year relationship with the scientist Nick Humphrey. In the 1984 TV adaptation of A Christmas Carol, she played Mrs Cratchit and both of her children co-starred as Cratchit offspring.

Politically, York was left-leaning, and publicly supported Mordechai Vanunu, the Israeli dissident who revealed Israel's nuclear weapons programme. While performing The Loves of Shakespeare's Women at the Cameri Theatre in Tel Aviv in June 2007, York dedicated the performance to Vanunu, evoking both cheers and jeers from the audience.

== Death ==
Diagnosed with cancer late in 2010, York refused chemotherapy and honoured a contractual obligation to appear in Ronald Harwood's Quartet. She died at the Royal Marsden Hospital in London from multiple myeloma on 15 January 2011, aged 72.

== Filmography ==
| Year | Title | Role | Notes |
|---|---|---|---|
| 1960 | The Richest Man in the World | Martine Herrault | |
| 1960 | There Was a Crooked Man | Ellen | |
| 1960 | Tunes of Glory | Morag Sinclair | |
| 1961 | The Greengage Summer | Joss Grey | |
| 1961 | The First Gentleman | Princess Charlotte | |
| 1962 | The Slaughter of St. Teresa's Day | Thelma Maguire | |
| 1962 | Freud: The Secret Passion | Cecily Koertner | Nominated – Golden Globe Award for Best Actress in a Motion Picture – Drama |
| 1963 | Tom Jones | Sophie Western | |
| 1964 | The 7th Dawn | Candace Trumpey | |
| 1964 | Scene Nun, Take One | The Actress | |
| 1965 | Sands of the Kalahari | Grace Munkton | |
| 1965 | Scruggs | Susan | |
| 1966 | The Fall of the House of Usher | Madeleine Usher | |
| 1966 | Kaleidoscope | Angel McGinnis | Laurel Award for Favorite Female Comedy Performance (5th place) |
| 1966 | A Man for All Seasons | Margaret More | |
| 1968 | Sebastian | Rebecca Howard | |
| 1968 | The Killing of Sister George | Alice 'Childie' McNaught | |
| 1968 | Duffy | Segolene | |
| 1969 | Lock Up Your Daughters | Hilaret | |
| 1969 | Oh! What a Lovely War | Eleanor | |
| 1969 | Battle of Britain | Section Officer Maggie Harvey | |
| 1969 | They Shoot Horses, Don't They? | Alice | BAFTA Award for Best Actress in a Supporting Role; Nominated – Academy Award for Best Supporting Actress; Nominated – Golden Globe Award for Best Supporting Actress – Motion Picture |
| 1970 | Country Dance | Hilary Dow | |
| 1970 | Jane Eyre | Jane Eyre | Nominated – Primetime Emmy Award for Outstanding Single Performance by an Actress in a Leading Role |
| 1971 | Happy Birthday, Wanda June | Penelope Ryan | |
| 1972 | X Y & Zee | Stella | |
| 1972 | Images | Cathryn | Best Actress Award (Cannes Film Festival) |
| 1974 | Fallen Angels | Julia Sterroll | |
| 1974 | Gold | Terry Steyner | |
| 1975 | The Maids | Claire | |
| 1975 | That Lucky Touch | Julia Richardson | |
| 1975 | Conduct Unbecoming | Mrs. Marjorie Scarlett | |
| 1976 | Sky Riders | Ellen Bracken | |
| 1976 | Eliza Fraser | Eliza Fraser | |
| 1977 | A Month in the Country | Natalia | |
| 1978 | The Shout | Rachel Fielding | |
| 1978 | The Silent Partner | Julie Carver | |
| 1978 | Long Shot | An Actress | |
| 1978 | Superman | Lara | |
| 1979 | The Golden Gate Murders | Sister Benecia | |
| 1980 | The Awakening | Jane Turner | |
| 1980 | Falling in Love Again | Sue Lewis | |
| 1980 | Superman II | Lara | Theatrical cut only |
| 1981 | Loophole | Dinah Booker | |
| 1982 | Alice | Queenie | |
| 1983 | Nelly's Version | Narrator (voice) | |
| 1983 | Yellowbeard | Lady Churchill | |
| 1984 | A Christmas Carol | Mrs. Cratchit | |
| 1985 | Star Quality | Lorraine Barry | |
| 1985 | Daemon | Rachel | |
| 1987 | Prettykill | Toni | |
| 1987 | Mio min Mio | Seamstress | |
| 1987 | Superman IV: The Quest for Peace | Lara | Voice |
| 1987 | Barbablù, Barbablù | Teresa | |
| 1988 | A Summer Story | Mrs. Narracombe | |
| 1988 | Just Ask for Diamond | Lauren Bacardi | |
| 1989 | Melancholia | Catherine Lanham Franck | |
| 1989 | A Handful of Time | Susanne Walker | |
| 1990 | Fate | | |
| 1992 | Illusions | Dr. Sinclair | |
| 1993 | The Higher Mortals | Miss Thorogood | |
| 1993 | Piccolo Grande Amore | Queen Christina | |
| 1997 | So This Is Romance? | Mike's Mum | |
| 1997 | Loop | Olivia | |
| 2000 | St. Patrick: The Irish Legend | Concessa | |
| 2002 | Highway | | |
| 2002 | The Book of Eve | May | |
| 2003 | Visitors | Carolyn Perry | Nominated – DVD Exclusive Award for Best Actress in a DVD Premiere Movie |
| 2006 | The Gigolos | Tessa Harrington | |
| 2006 | The Stoning | Jean Fielding | |
| 2008 | Franklyn | Margaret | |
| 2009 | The Calling | The Prioress | |

== Television ==
| Year | Title | Role | Notes |
|---|---|---|---|
| 1959-1972 | Armchair Theatre | Various | 7 episodes |
| 1961 | ITV Television Playhouse | Eva Sinding/Abigail Williams | 2 episodes |
| 1965 | Thursday Theatre | Milly Theale | Episode: "The Wings of the Dove" |
| 1966, 1974 | Jackanory | Storyteller | 2 stories |
| 1966–1967 | Theatre 625 | Bronwen/Jane | 2 episodes |
| 1968 | ITV Playhouse | Grace | Episode: "The Photographer" |
| 1973 | Orson Welles Great Mysteries | Countess Josephine | Episode: "La Grande Breteche" |
| 1979 | Prince Regent | Maria Fitzherbert | 6 episodes |
| 1981 | Second Chance | Kate Hurst | Miniseries |
| 1982 | We'll Meet Again | Dr. Helen Dereham | Miniseries |
| 1984 | A Christmas Carol | Mrs. Cratchit | TV movie |
| 1985 | The Love Boat | Kay Webber | 4 episodes |
| 1986 | The Two Ronnies | My Lady | Episode 12.2 |
| 1989 | After the War | Irene Jameson | 2 episodes |
| 1989 | The Ray Bradbury Theater | Nora | Episode: "The Haunting of the New" |
| 1990 | Screen Two | Amy Wallace | Episode: "The Man from the Pru" |
| 1990 | Boon | Lady Tessa Bolton | Episode: "Daddy's Girl" |
| 1991 | Devices and Desires | Meg Dennison | 6 episodes |
| 1991-1992 | Trainer | Rachel Ware | |
| 1997 | The Ruth Rendell Mysteries | Liz | Episode: "A Dark Blue Perfume" |
| 2003 | Holby City | Helen Grant | 9 episodes |
| 2004 | Casualty | Helen Grant | 2 episodes |
| 2010 | Missing | Marjorie Claye | Episode 2.9 |
| 2010 | Doctors | Lorna Robson | Episode: "Gibberish" |
