= The Mind Benders (1963 film) =

1963 British film by Basil Dearden

- U.S. theatrical poster
- Directed by: Basil Dearden
- Written by: James Kennaway
- Based on: The Mind Benders; 1963 novel by James Kennaway
- Produced by: Michael Relph
- Starring: Dirk Bogarde; Mary Ure; John Clements; Michael Bryant
- Cinematography: Denys N. Coop
- Edited by: John D. Guthridge
- Music by: Georges Auric
- Production company: Novus (Michael Relph Productions)
- Distributed by: Anglo-Amalgamated (UK); AIP (USA)
- Release dates: 21 February 1963 (London); 1 May 1963 (United States)
- Running time: 109 min
- Country: United Kingdom
- Language: English
- Budget: £210,781

The Mind Benders is a 1963 British thriller film produced by Michael Relph, directed by Basil Dearden and starring Dirk Bogarde, Mary Ure, John Clements, Michael Bryant and Wendy Craig. Screenwriter James Kennaway turned his screenplay into his 1963 novel of the same name.

American International Pictures released the film in the U.S. as a double feature with Operation Bikini (1963).

== Synopsis ==
Professor Sharpey, working in a university research laboratory, is suspected of passing secrets to the Soviet Union and commits suicide. British intelligence believe that his suicide was the result of shame over his betrayal of his country. However, Sharpey's former colleague Doctor Longman believes that the sensory-deprivation experiments that Sharpey was conducting on himself may have rendered him susceptible to brainwashing. He volunteers to undergo the same tests in order to prove his theory. An intelligence officer and a colleague test the theory by trying to brainwash Longman against his beloved wife.

== Cast ==
- Dirk Bogarde as Dr Henry Longman
- Mary Ure as Oonagh Longman
- John Clements as Major Hall
- Michael Bryant as Dr Tate
- Wendy Craig as Annabelle
- Harold Goldblatt as Professor Sharpey
- Geoffrey Keen as Calder
- Terry Palmer as Norman
- Norman Bird as taxi driver
- Terence Alexander as rowing coach (uncredited)
- Grace Arnold as Ttrain passenger (uncredited)
- Timothy Beaton as Paul Longman (uncredited)
- Elizabeth Counsell as girl student on station (uncredited)
- Roger Delgado as Doctor Jean Bonvoulois (uncredited)
- Terence Edmond as 1st student at party (uncredited)
- Edward Fox as Stewart (uncredited)
- Robin Hawdon as student in Oxford (uncredited)
- Georgina Moon as Persephone Longman (uncredited)
- Edward Palmer as porter (uncredited)
- Philip Ray as father (uncredited)
- Pauline Winter as mother (uncredited)

== Reception ==
In a contemporary review for The New York Times, critic Howard Thompson called the film an "experiment that doesn't hold water" and wrote: "Credit the Dearden-Relph unit for a smoothly machined drama, not entirely convincing but at least original...[T]he film slides downhill toward the conclusion that love conquers all, even science. The finale is a highly circumstantial childbirth. Mr. Bogarde, whose coiled, jittery behavior has no place in a 'top secret' laboratory, also murmurs something about experimental freedom."

In a modern-day review, TV Guide called the film "a strange movie that leaves a deeper impression than one might expect due to the originality of the plot and the tense direction. It is the direct predecessor of Altered States."

The film was a box-office disappointment. Relph said "it didn't really come off but it was an interesting film."
