= Some Gorgeous Accident =

Novel by James Kennaway

- First edition (publ. Atheneum Books)
- Author: James Kennaway
- Language: English
- Publication date: 1967

Some Gorgeous Accident (1967) was James Kennaway's fifth novel and the last to be published during his lifetime. It is a portrait of a triangular relationship between photographer James Link, journalist Susan Steinberg and doctor Richard David Fiddes.

A stage adaptation of Some Gorgeous Accident was presented at the Assembly Rooms as part of the Edinburgh Festival in August 2010.

== See also ==
- Scottish literature
