= Katerina Anghelaki-Rooke =

Greek poet (1939–2020)

- Born: 22 February 1939; Athens, Greece
- Died: 21 January 2020 (aged 80); Athens, Greece
- Occupation: Poet

Katerina Anghelaki-Rooke (Greek: Κατερίνα Αγγελάκη-Ρουκ; 22 February 1939 – 21 January 2020) was a Greek poet, translator and lecturer.

== Life ==
Anghelaki-Rooke was born in Athens, the daughter of Eleni (née Stamati) from Patras and Yannis Anghelakis from Asia Minor. Her godfather was the Cretan writer Nikos Kazantzakis, a close friend of her parents. She married Rodney Rooke in 1963. While a very young child she contracted a bacterial infection that ate affected her bones and left her with a severe limp and a stunted arm. She attended primary and secondary school in Athens. She followed courses at the Universities of Athens and Nice, completing her studies with a degree in translation and interpretation at the University of Geneva.

As well as working as a translator, she produced pistachio nuts at her orchard on the island of Aegina, where her parents had bought an old house in the 1920s and planted pistachio trees. She spent most of her time in a rented flat in Athens, but it was in Aegina that she felt most at home. She published her first poem in the magazine Καινούργια εποχή in 1956. The themes of her poetry include the close relation between the human being and the natural world; a constant meditation on death; the experience of being a woman in a society that has traditionally circumscribed women’s activities; the indispensable contribution of sex and passionate love to the fulfilment of the self; the often tragic but at times triumphant dependency of the self on the body; and the aspiration to transcend the limitations of the body by means of the body itself. In 1985, she received the second State Poetry Prize, in 2000 the Kostas and Eleni Ourani Prize from the Academy of Athens, and in 2014 she was awarded the Grand State Prize for Literature for the totality of her work. Her poetry has been published in at least eleven languages.

Her literary translations were done chiefly from English (her husband’s language) and from Russian (the language she learned in her earliest years from her Russian nanny). The authors she translated from English include Saul Bellow, Joseph Brodsky, Seamus Heaney, Sylvia Plath, Dylan Thomas (Under Milk Wood), and Derek Walcott. The Russian authors whom she translated include Leonid Andreyev, Vasily Grossman, Mikhail Lermontov, Vladimir Mayakovsky, Alexander Pushkin, Varlam Shalamov, and Andrei Voznesensky.

== Works ==
- Λύκοι και σύννεφα (1963)
- Ποιήματα 63-69 (1971)
- Μαγδαληνή, το μεγάλο θηλαστικό (1974)
- Τα σκόρπια χαρτιά της Πηνελόπης (1977)
- Ο θρίαμβος της σταθερής απώλειας (1978)
- Ενάντιος έρωτας (1982)
- Οι μνηστήρες (1984)
- Όταν το σώμα (1988)
- Επίλογος αέρας (1990)
- Άδεια φύση (1993)
- Λυπιού (1995)
- Ωραία έρημος ωραία η σάρκα (1996)
- Ποιήματα 1963–1977 (1997)
- Ποιήματα 1978–1985 (1998)
- Ποιήματα 1986–1996 (1999)
- Η ύλη μόνη (2001)
- Μεταφράζοντας σε έρωτα της ζωής το τέλος (2003)
- Στον ουρανό τού τίποτα με ελάχιστα (2005)
- Η ανορεξία της ύπαρξης (2011)
- Ποίηση 1963–2011 (complete poems, 2014)
- Της μοναξιάς διπρόσωποι μονόλογοι (2016)
- Των αντιθέτων διάλογοι και με τον ανήλεο χρόνο (2018)
- Με άλλο βλέμμα (2018)

=== English ===
- The Body is the Victory and the Defeat of Dreams (tr. Philip Ramp, 1975)
- Beings and Things on Their Own (tr. by the author and Jackie Willcox, 1986)
- From Purple into Night (tr. by the author and Jackie Willcox, 1998)
- Translating into Love Life’s End (tr. by the author, 2004)
- The Scattered Papers of Penelope: New and Selected Poems (anthology, ed. Karen Van Dyck, 2008 & 2009)
- Selected Poems (tr. Manolis Aligizakis, 2019)
