= Scrag =

Scrag can refer to:

- Global Rocket 1, given the NATO reporting name SS-X-10 Scrag
- A monster, also referred to as a "wizard", in the 1996 computer game Quake
- A type of aquatic troll in Dungeons & Dragons
- A derogatory term for a girl or woman, especially in Australia
- Scrag end, a cut of lamb taken from the neck
- To play fight or rough and tumble between adult and child
- To kill by hanging or strangling, nearly synonymous with 'lynch'
