= Scroggs =

Scroggs is a surname found most commonly in the UK and United States. It originates from a Scots word meaning small tree or large bush.

Scroggs may refer to:

- Rebecca Scroggs (born 1982), Afro-British actress
- Sir William Scroggs (1623–1683), Lord Chief Justice of England
- William A. Scroggs (1896–1984), Founder of Kappa Kappa Psi fraternity
- The Scroggs, a Site of Special Scientific Interest in Northumberland, England
- Roy Scroggs, a tailor and Aviation visionary; he patented a Delta wing airplane in 1929 and flew it.
