= Up, Up and Oy Vey =

- Book cover - Up, Up and Oy Vey
- Author: Simcha Weinstein
- Language: English
- Genre: Humor
- Publisher: Leviathan Press
- Publication date: 2006
- Publication place: United States
- Media type: Print
- Pages: 152
- ISBN: 978-1-881927-32-7

Up, Up and Oy Vey: How Jewish History, Culture and Values Shaped the Comic Book Superhero is a book by Rabbi Simcha Weinstein.

== Themes ==
In the book, Weinstein contends that because the creators of many famous superheroes, such as Superman, were Jewish, those superheroes were inspired by Jewish values and Jewish figures, such as Moses, David, the Golem, and Samson.

The book argues that the Jewish creators of early comic books, as the children of immigrants, tried to escape the feeling of inferiority occasioned by their being a minority religion by creating superheroes who would fight for truth and justice. Up, Up and Oy Vey argues that the secret, dual lives of many superheroes mirrors the dual lives of their creators, privately Jewish, publicly American.

The book contains a section of full-color excerpts from certain comic books.

== Reception ==
The book won the 2006 General Nonfiction award from the Hollywood Book Festival.

== See also ==
- Oy vey
