= David Michael Petrou =

American film producer

David Michael Petrou is a film producer, author and communications executive. In 2013, he served as Co-Executive Producer on Ronny & I. Petrou wrote The Making of Superman (Warner Books, 1978) while he was part of the senior production team on the first two Superman movies starring Christopher Reeve. His previous non-fiction book, Crossed Swords, was about film making behind the Iron Curtain in Budapest, Hungary. Petrou is also a nationally recognized accredited communications executive. He established and ran Eisner, Petrou & Associates, with headquarters in Washington, D.C. and an office in Baltimore, Maryland, from 1986 until 2005.

== Biography ==
=== Education ===
In 1971 Petrou graduated from the University of Maryland, College Park with a bachelor's degree in English. In 1973, he received his master's degree in English & Journalism from Georgetown University.

=== Career ===
Petrou began his career in New York, NY as Associate Director of Public Relations at Ballantine Books, the paperback division of Random House. Following three years in the publishing industry, Petrou worked for eight years in motion picture production and development. For three years, he worked at the Salkind Organization on the first two “Superman” films, shot on location around the world and at Pinewood Studios outside London. He later worked for motion picture studio Warner Bros. in Los Angeles, where he was an executive consultant in production and marketing.

Petrou wrote "The Making of Superman: The Movie Petrou returned to Washington, D.C., where he served as a director for the late Ambassador R. Sargent Shriver II and the late Eunice Kennedy Shriver at The Joseph P. Kennedy Foundation. In 1986, he founded Eisner, Petrou and Associates, Inc., a full service communications agency based in Washington, DC, where he served as President and Chief Operating Officer until 2005.

=== Board and Advisory Councils ===
Petrou has served as a member of the Kennedy Center Community Advisory Board, the Choral Arts Society of Washington Board and the Washington Men’s Camerata Advisory Board. He is also a baritone singer with The Choral Arts Society of Washington. Petrou participated in several recordings, including: London Symphony Orchestra recording of Mahler “Symphony No. 8,” Valery Gergiev, conductor. “Make Me Drunk with Your Kisses,” by Alexander Knaifel, composer; Mstislav Rostropovich, cellist; Norman Scribner, conductor “Of Rage and Remembrance,” by John Corrigliano, composer, Leonard Slatkin, conductor, with the National Symphony Orchestra. Grammy Award-winner for Best Classical Recording.

== Awards ==
Petrou has received the Silver Anvil Award from the Public Relations Society of America as well as the PRSA Best in Maryland Awards.
