= Simcha Weinstein =

English author (born 1975)

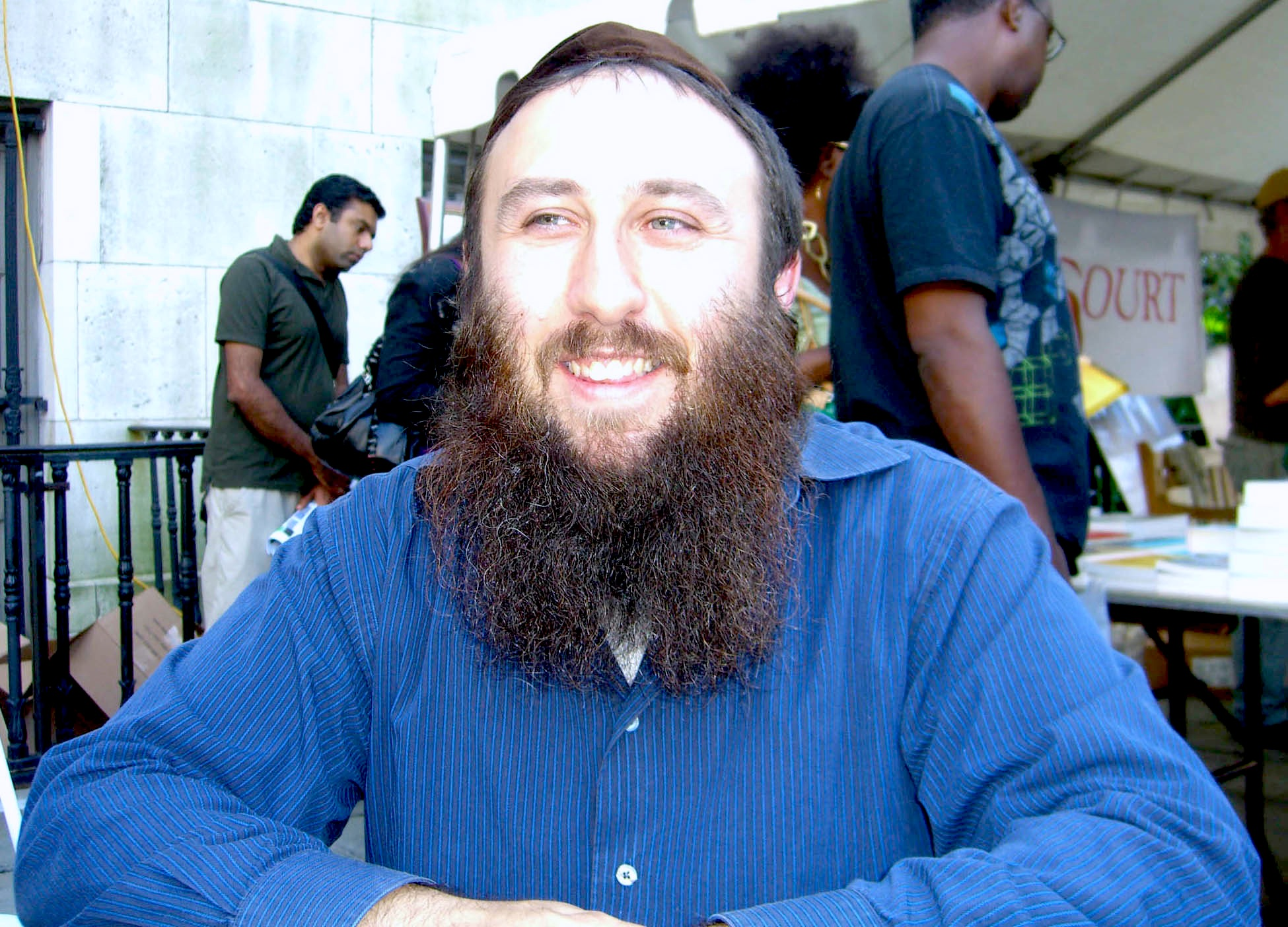
- Weinstein at the 2009 Brooklyn Book Festival
- Born: Simon Weinstein
- Occupations: Author, rabbi

Simon Weinstein, known by his Hebrew name Simcha Weinstein (Hebrew: שמחה װײַנשטיין), is an English author and a rabbi. In 2006, his first book, Up Up and Oy Vey: How Jewish History, Culture and Values Shaped the Comic Book Superhero, was published. In 2008, his second book, Shtick Shift: Jewish Humor in the 21st Century, was published.

== Early life ==
Simon Weinstein, Hebrew name "Simcha", joined the British film commission, and worked as a location scout for films like The Full Monty and Spice World.

== Career ==
Weinstein ministers to Jewish students at Pratt Institute (where he serves as chair of its Religious Affairs Committee), Brooklyn Law School, Long Island University, and Polytechnic Institute of New York University. In 2003 he founded the semiannual Brooklyn Heights Jewish Film Festival. He is also the founder of the Downtown Brooklyn Jewish Student Foundation and is the Chabad emissary to the Downtown Brooklyn student community and the Clinton Hill community.

Weinstein's first book, Up Up and Oy Vey, published in 2006, analyses the Jewish role in the creation of such popular comic book superheroes as Superman, Batman, Hulk, Captain America, and Spider-Man, as well as super-teams like the Fantastic Four, the X-Men and the Justice League of America. The book also discusses Jewish superheroes, like Shadowcat, Sabra and The Thing and Jewish graphic artists including Jerry Siegel, Joe Shuster, Will Eisner, Bob Kane, Bill Finger, Jerry Robinson, Chris Claremont, Julius Schwartz and Stan Lee. Up Up and Oy Vey won the Independent Book Publishers Association's Benjamin Franklin award in 2007 for religious book of the year.

The first sentence of the book reveals Weinstein's interest in the link between popular superheroes and Jewish tradition: "Before Superman, Batman, and Spider-Man, there were the superpatriarchs and supermatriarchs of the Bible and heroic figures named Moses, Aaron, Joshua, David and Samson – not to mention the miracle-working prophet Elijah and those Jewish wonderwomen Ruth and Esther just to name a few. They all wielded courage and supernatural powers to protect and serve their people."

Weinstein's second book Shtick Shift: Jewish Humor in the 21st Century, published in 2008, presents an overview of the approach modern Jewish comedians are taking to their work – brutal, matter-of-fact, and unashamedly Jewish. To contrast the older approach with the newer approach, Weinstein gives examples of the comedy of previous generations of comedians such as Gertrude Berg, Woody Allen, Sid Caesar, and Mel Brooks. He then presents in-depth analysis of Jewish comedic performers, including Jerry Seinfeld, Larry David, Sacha Baron Cohen and Sarah Silverman.

Weinstein and his work have been discussed in The New York Times, Seattle Times, Chicago Tribune, Houston Chronicle, Arizona Daily Star, Miami Herald, The Forward, Arutz Sheva, Terra Networks in Argentina, La Stampa in Italy, and on CNN.

== Articles ==
- Freedman, Samuel G. "Religion and Comic Books: Where Did Superman’s Theology Come From?", New York Times (23 September 2006)
- Pinsky, Mark I. "Putting the 'fun' in fundamentalism", USA Today (8 December 2008)
- Weinstein, Simcha. "Is it a bird, is it a plane .... it's you know who!", Jerusalem Post (20 July 2006)
- Weinstein, Simcha. "Spirituality in spandex", Jerusalem Post (3 May 2007)
- Weinstein, Simcha. "Behind Batman and Joker are Borscht Belt comedians", St. Petersburg Times (22 July 2008)

== Books ==
- Up Up and Oy Vey: How Jewish History, Culture and Values Shaped the Comic Book Superhero (2006)
- Shtick Shift: Jewish Humor in the 21st Century (2008)

== See also ==
- List of Jewish superheroes
- Chabad hipsters
- Arie Kaplan
