= Story Teller (magazine) =

Defunct magazine partwork

Story Teller was a magazine partwork published by Marshall Cavendish between 1982 and 1985. It was sold as Story Time in Australia and New Zealand; in Italy Story Teller 1 was sold as I Raccontastorie while Story Teller 2 as C'era una volta)

== Publishing history ==
=== The original collection ===
The original Story Teller was released from December 1982 and throughout 1983 as a fortnightly partwork. Each magazine contained a selection of children's stories, some traditional folk tales like "Anansi the Spiderman", some children's tales such as Gobbolino, the Witch's Cat, and some contemporary works written especially for the series, like "Timbertwig". Most issues contained a poem or two, as well. The stories were accompanied by lavish colour artwork, and inside each issue was an offer to purchase custom made binders for the magazine as well as cases to hold the tapes. Each issue of Story Teller came with a cover-mounted cassette tape containing a reading of the stories, complete with music and sound effects. What set Story Teller apart from other partworks was the stories were read by professional actors and celebrities of the time, including Richard Briers, Tim Curry, Sheila Hancock, Derek Jacobi, and Nigel Lambert.

Two distinguishing features of the audio cassettes were the "Story Teller" jingle that introduced and ended each tape and the characteristic "ping" that sounded when the time came to turn the pages to encourage children to read along. The "Story Teller" jingle is an existing track called "Children's Carnival" by Ted Atking and Alain Feanch.

Longer stories were split over multiple issues to encourage parents to buy the next issue. These were referred to as Story Teller Serials. As one serial came to end, another would start. Many of these would be simple two-part stories, but a selection of stories (usually well-known ones such as Peter Pan and the Wizard of Oz) were spread over several issues. Pinocchio was the longest serial, with seven installments.

The original collection was 26 issues long with each tape lasting up to 45 minutes. An exception was issue 26, which was 90 minutes long because it also contained the special preview issue for Story Teller 2, which immediately followed the original series.

(The New Zealand and Australian Story Time only ran for 1 series, so the final Issue 26 was the standard 45 minutes long and did not feature the special preview for the next series. This was the sole difference between its UK counterpart; the cassettes and artwork were otherwise identical. Similarly, the cassette carry case was available in Australia. However, in New Zealand, a smaller box was provided, made out of cardboard wrapped in a red plastic with small domes at the corners joining it all together and a piece of Velcro for the flap on the top).

=== Storyteller 2 ===
Story Teller 2, which was previewed in issue 26 of the original Story Teller series in the UK, continued the tradition of the original by combining traditional and contemporary children's stories. (In New Zealand and Australia, Story Time only ran for 1 series.)

=== Little Story Teller ===
When Story Teller 2 ended, Marshall Cavendish followed it up with another 26-part series, Little Story Teller, which, as its title suggests, was aimed at a younger audience than the original series. Many of the stories in Little Story Teller featured the adventures of the inhabitants of the Magic Mountain, which included Leroy the Lion, Dotty the Dragon, and Morris and Doris the hamsters.

=== Christmas specials ===
Three Christmas specials were also published. Released annually along with each series, the Christmas Story Tellers featured festive stories and even songs. The third Christmas Story Teller included stories suited to both the original series and Little Story Teller. Of the Christmas specials only Christmas Story 2 was made available in New Zealand or Australia, under the title of Christmas Story Time.

=== Story Teller Song Book ===
Christmas Story 3 was widely assumed to be the last title from the Story Teller series but in 1986, Marshall Cavendish released the Story Teller Song Book. The 52-page publication contained 20 all-time sing-along favourites rather than stories but it still retained the Story Teller tradition of featuring colouring and activity pages as well as an accompanying cassette tape.

=== My Big Book of Fairy Tales ===
In 1987, Marshall Cavendish revisited the world of Story Teller by publishing a big hardback book called My Big Book of Fairy Tales. Although the publication lacked the Story Teller branding, it was essentially a compilation of the best stories from Story Teller; it contained 73 stories from the two series and three Christmas issues. The original text and illustrations were used, except for the story "The Frog Prince", which featured new artwork (for no apparent reason). The book was rereleased in 1989 with a different cover and again in 1994. Unlike the partwork, My Big Book of Fairy Tales was not accompanied by a cassette.

=== Story Teller: Members' Edition ===
Published online in December 2020, this was a special edition of Story Teller, created by members of the Story Teller Facebook Group and some of the original writers and artists of the original Story Teller. It is available online at stme.uk.

=== Availability ===
The partwork is now regarded as highly collectible, and issues can still be found today in secondhand and charity shops, but finding a complete set can be very difficult. Digital copies can also be found on auction sites such as eBay, but these are of dubious legality.

== Stories and readers ==
=== Story Teller 1 ===
Part 1

- Gobbolino, the Witch's Cat: Sheila Hancock
- The Hare and the Tortoise: Bernard Cribbins
- The Shoe Tree: Sheila Hancock
- The Emperor's New Clothes: Bernard Cribbins
- The Red Nightcaps: Marise Hepworth
- Aldo in Arcadia (1): Nigel Lambert & John Brewer
- The Forest Troll: Nigel Lambert

Part 2

- The Elves & the Shoemaker: Brian Blessed
- Master Tiger: Nigel Lambert
- Aldo in Arcadia (2): Nigel Lambert, John Brewer & John Green
- The Last Slice of Rainbow: Sheila Hancock
- Gobbolino the Ship's Cat: Sheila Hancock
- The Greedy Fox: Brian Blessed
- Sinbad & the Valley of Diamonds: Brian Blessed
- Bring on the Clowns: Nigel Lambert

Part 3

- The Great Big Hairy Boggart: Dermot Crowley
- The Owl and the Pussycat: Susannah York
- Gobbolino the Knight's Cat: Sheila Hancock
- The Lion & the Mouse: Dermot Crowley
- Simon's Canal: Susannah York
- Hansel and Gretel: Susannah York
- Aldo in Arcadia (3): Robert Powell, Susannah York, Nigel Lambert & John Brewer
- Child of the Sun: Dermot Crowley

Part 4

- Narana's Strange Journey: Roy Hudd
- Rhubarb Ted: Nigel Lambert
- Gobbolino the Kitchen Cat: Sheila Hancock
- Noisy Neighbours: Nigel Lambert
- Jester Minute (Part 1): Nigel Lambert
- The Princess & the Pea: Tina Jones
- The Ant and the Grasshopper: Marian Hepworth
- Santa's Early Christmas: Roy Hudd

Part 5

- Timbertwig: George Layton
- The Fox and the Crow: Hayley Mills
- Drummerboy & the Gypsy: George Layton
- Rapunzel: Hayley Mills
- Virgil's Big Mistake: Nigel Lambert
- Jester Minute (Part 2): Nigel Lambert
- 'O Here It Is: Hayley Mills

Part 6

- Beauty and the Beast: Hywel Bennett
- Dodo & the Pot of Gold: Patricia Brake
- Timbertwig & the Caravan of Surprises: George Layton
- The Flying Piggy-Bank: Patricia Brake
- The Land of the Bumbley Boo: Patricia Brake
- The Moon and the Millpond: Dick Vosburgh
- The Friendly Bear: Hywel Bennett

Part 7

- The Billy Goats Gruff: Nigel Pegram
- The Snow Queen: Liza Goddard
- A Pocketful of Trouble: Nigel Pegram
- Little Spook of Spook Hall: Liza Goddard
- The Silly Tortoise: Nigel Pegram
- Timbertwig Gets a New Hat: George Layton
- Faster than Fairies: Liza Goddard

Part 8

- Dot & the Kangaroo (Part 1: Dot Loses Her Way): Carole Boyd
- Oliphaunt: Joss Ackland
- The Goose that Laid the Golden Egg: Carole Boyd
- The Selfish Giant: Joss Ackland
- Jester Minute & the Vanishing castle (1): Nigel Lambert
- The Creation of Man: Joss Ackland
- Boffy & The Teacher Eater: Nigel Lambert

Part 9

- Abdulla and the Genie: Nigel Lambert
- Dot & the Kangaroo (Part 2): Carole Boyd
- Jester Minute and the Vanishing Castle (2): Nigel Lambert
- The Boy Who Cried Wolf: Robert Powell
- Neville Toogood: Carole Boyd
- The Pied Piper of Hamelin: Robert Powell

Part 10

- Gulliver's Travels (Part 1): Joanna Lumley
- Dot & the Kangaroo (Part 3): Carole Boyd
- Mike's Bike (Part 1): Mick Ford
- The Three Wishes: Carole Boyd
- David and Goliath: Mick Ford
- The Enchanted Horse: Joanna Lumley
- Mr. Tom Narrow: Carole Boyd

Part 11

- Gulliver's Travels (Part 2): Joanna Lumley
- Pinocchio (Part 1): Ian Lavender
- The Dog and the Bone: David Graham
- Sleeping Beauty: Joanna Lumley
- Walter Spaggot: Nigel Lambert
- Growling at Tigers: David Graham
- Mike's Bike (Part 2): Mick Ford

Part 12

- The Mighty Prince: Una Stubbs
- Ford's Toy Cars (Part 1): George Layton
- Drummerboy Races for his Life: George Layton
- First Flight: Ian Lavender
- The Town Mouse & the Country Mouse: Una Stubbs
- Pinocchio (Part 2): Ian Lavender
- The Gingerbread Man: Una Stubbs

Part 13

- The Tinder Box: Siân Phillips
- Ford's Toy Cars (Part 2): George Layton
- Warrior Girl: Floella Benjamin
- Pinocchio (Part 3): Ian Lavender
- Three Bald Spots: Carole Boyd
- The Ugly Duckling: Siân Phillips

Part 14

- The Monster in the Labyrinth: Dermot Crowley
- Who's Stronger?: Diana Rigg
- Pinocchio (Part 4): Ian Lavender
- The Old Man of Torbay: Diana Rigg
- Scarlet Braces: Dermot Crowley
- Grogre the Ogre (Part 1): Nigel Lambert
- Cinderella: Diana Rigg

Part 15

- Pandora's Box: Morag Hood
- A Fishy Tale: Morag Hood
- Pinocchio (Part 5): Ian Lavender
- Grogre the Ogre (Part 2): Nigel Lambert
- The Parasol: Kay Parks
- The Flying Jacket: Lionel Jeffries
- The Three Little Pigs: Lionel Jeffries

Part 16

- Sam's Big Break: Tommy Eytle
- The Mango-Seller: Judy Geeson
- Hen-Hustler Kluk: Tommy Eytle
- Puss in Boots: Judy Geeson
- Grogre the Ogre (Part 3): Nigel Lambert
- Pinocchio (Part 6): Ian Lavender

Part 17

- William Tell: Tom Baker
- I Saw a Ship a-Sailing: Carole Boyd
- Pinocchio (Part 7): Ian Lavender
- Anansi and the Fancy Dress Party: Tom Baker
- Jojo's Jigsaw Puzzle: Carole Boyd
- Can You Keep a Secret?: Carole Boyd
- The Lion and the Peacock: Tom Baker

Part 18

- Heidi (Part 1): Denise Bryer
- Father William: Steven Pacey
- George and the Dragon: Steven Pacey
- The Frog Prince: Gemma Craven
- Bubble and Squeek: Steven Pacey
- No Mules: Gemma Craven

Part 19

- Jack & the Beanstalk: Brian Blessed
- Why the Giraffe Can't Speak: Carole Boyd
- Sinbad and the Amazing Islands: Brian Blessed
- The Book of Beasts (Part 1): John Baddeley
- Car Attack: Carole Boyd
- Heidi (Part 2): Denise Bryer
- Hedge's Problem Tree: Carole Boyd

Part 20

- Rumpelstiltskin: Hayley Mills
- Heidi (Part 3): Denise Bryer
- The Green Maiden of the Lake: Hayley Mills
- The Book of Beasts (Part 2): John Baddeley
- It Makes a Change: Denise Bryer
- Lutra the Otter: Michael Tudor Barnes

Part 21

- The Bold Little Tailor: Michael Hordern
- The Wolf in Sheep's Clothing: Nigel Lambert
- Wiser than the Czar: Michael Hordern
- Bobbie and the Magic Go-Cart: Nigel Lambert
- Heidi (Part 4): Denise Bryer
- The Mighty Rabbit: Nigel Lambert

Part 22

- Waldorf's Fantastic Trip (Part 1): Gay Soper
- The Midas Touch: Joanna Lumley
- A Meal with a Magician: George Layton
- Eleven Wild Swans: Joanna Lumley
- Timbertwig Catches a Marrow: George Layton
- The Human Fly from Bendigo: Joanna Lumley

Part 23

- Timbertwig's Birthday: George Layton
- Waldorf's Fantastic Trip (Part 2): Gay Soper
- Goldilocks: Annette Crosbie
- Dad and the Cat and the Tree: David Ashford
- The Faery Flag: Annette Crosbie
- The Runaway Piano: David Ashford
- The Little Red Hen: Annette Crosbie

Part 24

- I Wish, I Wish: Carole Boyd
- Counting Chickens: Carole Boyd
- A Hedgehog Learns to Fly: John Brewer, John Green and Steven Pacey
- The Little Tin Soldier: Ian Holm
- Kingdom of the Seals: Ian Holm
- Aldo in Arcadia (4): Steven Pacey, Nigel Lambert, John Green & John Brewer

Part 25

- Little Red Riding Hood: Denise Bryer
- The Happy Prince: Tim Curry
- Aldo in Arcadia (5): John Brewer, Tina Jones, Nigel Lambert & Steven Pacey
- Mr Miacca: Denise Bryer
- The Great Pie Contest: Steven Pacey
- Stolen Thunder: Tim Curry

Part 26

- The Goblin Rat: Liza Goddard
- Thumbelina: Liza Goddard
- Where Can an Elephant Hide?: Steven Pacey
- A Lion at School: Liza Goddard
- Captain Bones: Dermot Crowley
- Aldo in Arcadia (6): John Brewer, Tina Jones, Nigel Lambert & Steven Pacey

Part 26 Story Teller 2 Special Preview Issue

- The Wind in the Willows: Michael Jayston
- Jack-in-the-Box: Steven Pacey
- Campbell the Travelling Cat: Una Stubbs
- Arthur the Lazy Ant: Steven Pacey
- Dragon Child: Una Stubbs
- The Magic Porridge Pot: Steven Pacey
- The Lobster Quadrille: Una Stubbs

=== Story Teller 2 ===
Part 1

- The Wizard of Oz : Miriam Margolyes
- The Creatures with Beautiful Eyes : Martin Shaw
- The Circus Animal's Strike : David Tate
- Yushkin the Watchmaker : Martin Shaw
- Rumbles in the Jungles (1) : David Tate
- The Dancing Fairies : Miriam Margolyes
- There Once Was a Puffin : Martin Shaw

Part 2

- The Magic of Funky Monkey : Gemma Craven
- The Snake and the Rose : Gemma Craven
- Rumbles in the Jungles (2) : David Tate
- The Wizard of Oz: In The Forest : Miriam Margolyes
- The Wind in the Willows: The Wild Wood : Michael Jayston
- The Troll : Gemma Craven

Part 3

- The Musicians Of Bremen : Nigel Hawthorne
- Little Joe and the Sea Dragon : Dermot Crowley
- The Lord of the Rushie River (1) : Denise Bryer
- The Wizard of Oz: The Emerald City : Miriam Margolyes
- Party in the Sky : Nigel Hawthorne
- Kebeg : Denise Bryer
- The Song of the Engine : Nigel Hawthorne

Part 4

- Shorty the Satellite and the Lost Rocket : Nigel Lambert
- The Wizard of Oz: Quest for the Wicked Witch : Miriam Margolyes
- Petrushka : Janet Suzman
- The Garden : Nigel Lambert
- Master of the Lake : Janet Suzman
- The Lord of the Rushie River (2) : Denise Bryer
- Riloby-rill : Janet Suzman

Part 5

- The Snow Bear : Derek Jacobi
- The Inn of Donkeys : Derek Jacobi
- Shorty the Satellite and the Brigadier : Nigel Lambert
- The Nightingale : Derek Jacobi
- Hugo and the Man Who Stole Colours : Nigel Lambert
- The Wizard of Oz: A Great And Terrible Humbug : Miriam Margolyes
- Recipe : Nigel Lambert

Part 6

- Gobbolino and the Little Wooden Horse (1) : Sheila Hancock
- The Wizard of Oz: The Final Journey : Miriam Margolyes
- The Farmer, the Tomt and the Troll : Carole Boyd
- Shorty The Satellite And The Shooting Star : Nigel Lambert
- The Fishing Stone : Carole Boyd
- Silly Old Baboon : Nigel Lambert

Part 7

- Traveller Ned : Morag Hood
- Gobbolino and the Little Wooden Horse (2) : Sheila Hancock
- Little Bear And The Beaver : Ian Lavender
- The Ju-Ju Man : Floella Benjamin
- A Song for Slug : Ian Lavender
- Larkspur Gets Her Wings : Morag Hood
- Windy Nights : Ian Lavender

Part 8

- The Most Beautiful House : Robin Nedwell
- Gobbolino and the Little Wooden Horse (3) : Sheila Hancock
- The Orchestra That Lost Its Voice : Steven Pacey
- Stone Soup : Debbie Arnold
- The Man Who Knew Better : Robin Nedwell
- How the Polar Bear Became : Debbie Arnold
- The Marrog : Steven Pacey

Part 9

- Diggersaurs (1) : Steven Pacey
- Molly Whuppie : Eve Karpf
- Young Kate : Eve Karpf
- Upside-Down Willie (1) : Steven Pacey
- Gobbolino and the Little Wooden Horse (4) : Sheila Hancock
- Meeting : Eve Karpf

Part 10

- Toad of Toad Hall (1) : Richard Briers
- Simeom the Sorcerer's Son (1) : George Layton
- Anansi and the Python : Ysanne Churchman
- Stone Drum : Ysanne Churchman
- Upside-Down Willie (2) : Steven Pacey
- Gobbolino and the Little Wooden Horse (5) : Sheila Hancock
- Hannibal : George Layton

Part 11

- Grogre the Golden Ogre (1) : Nigel Lambert
- Anya's Garden : Carole Boyd
- Miss Priscilla's Secret : Carole Boyd
- Simeom the Sorcerer's Son (2) : George Layton
- The Tortoises' Picnic : David Adams
- Toad of Toad Hall (2) : Richard Briers
- Big Gumbo : Carole Boyd

Part 12

- Box of Robbers : Patricia Hodge
- The Challenging Bull : Nigel Lambert
- Barney's Winter Present : Antonia Swinson
- Toad of Toad Hall (3) : Richard Briers
- Minnie the Floating Witch : Patricia Hodge
- Grogre the Golden Ogre (2) : Nigel Lambert
- An Eskimo Baby : Patricia Hodge

Part 13

- Brer Rabbit and the Tar-Baby : Dick Vosburgh
- Geordie's Mermaid : Susan Jameson
- Grogre the Golden Ogre (3) : Nigel Lambert
- Gatecrashers : Susan Jameson
- Toad of Toad Hall (4) : Richard Briers
- The Princess Who Met the North Wind : Susan Jameson

Part 14

- Peter Pan (1) : Derek Jacobi
- The Scrubs and the Dubs (1) : Windsor Davies
- Horace's Vanishing Trick : Gay Soper
- The Tumbledown Boy : Gay Soper
- The Horn Flute : John Shrapnel
- King Ferdinand's Fancy Socks : Gay Soper
- The Flower Seller : John Shrapnel

Part 15

- Peter Pan (2) : Derek Jacobi
- Cath's Cradle : Una Stubbs
- The Scrubs and the Dubs (2) : Windsor Davies
- Willow Pattern : Anthony Jackson
- Gary the Greatest : Anthony Jackson
- Campbell Finds a Castle : Una Stubbs
- A Child's Thought : Una Stubbs

Part 16

- The Thin King and the Fat Cook : Patricia Brake
- Peter Pan (3) : Derek Jacobi
- Bored Brenda : Patricia Brake
- The Swords of King Arthur : Mick Ford
- Touching Silver : Patricia Brake
- Noggin and the Birds : Oliver Postgate
- Goblin Market : Mick Ford

Part 17

- Longtooth's Tale (1) : Steven Pacey
- Shubiki's Hat : Eva Haddon
- Big Red Head (1) : Ruth Madoc
- The Tree that Sang : Steven Pacey
- Too Many Buns for Rosie : Eva Haddon
- Peter Pan (4) : Derek Jacobi
- The Moon : Eva Haddon

Part 18

- Longtooth's Tale (2) : Steven Pacey
- Galldora and the Woods-Beyond : Eve Karpf
- Big Red Head (2) : Ruth Madoc
- At the Forge : James Bryce
- Mouse in the Snow : Eve Karpf
- Peter Pan (5) : Derek Jacobi
- I Had a Little Nut-Tree : James Bryce

Part 19

- Alice's Adventures in Wonderland (1) : Patricia Hodge
- Wonder Wellies : Nigel Lambert
- Peter and the Mountainy Men : Carole Boyd
- The Treachery of Morgan : Mick Ford
- Pat's Piano : Carole Boyd
- Danger in the Reeds : Nigel Lambert
- My Uncle Paul of Pimlico : Nigel Lambert

Part 20

- Arthur Gives Back His Sword : Mick Ford
- Butterflies on the Moon : Geoffrey Matthews
- Ginger's Secret Weapons : Cass Allen
- Alice's Adventures in Wonderland (2) : Patricia Hodge
- A Great Escape : Cass Allen
- The Miller and His Donkey : Geoffrey Matthews
- Sheep-Dog : Geoffrey Matthews

Part 21

- Never Tangle With aA Tengu : Christopher Timothy
- Diggersaurs (2) : Steven Pacey
- Nothing Like a Bath : Denise Bryer
- Alice's Adventures in Wonderland (3) : Patricia Hodge
- The Neat and Tidy Kitchen : Denise Bryer
- Tommy's Shadow : Steven Pacey
- My Mother Said : Denise Bryer

Part 22

- Quest of the Brave : Martin Jarvis
- The Captain's Horse : Martin Jarvis
- Alice's Adventures in Wonderland (4) : Patricia Hodge
- The City of Lost Submarines (1) : David Tate
- Nogbad Comes Back : Oliver Postgate
- Ostriches Can't Fly : Joanna Wake
- The Cottage : Joanna Wake

Part 23

- Cyril Snorkel - The Performing Beast : Denise Bryer
- Dorrie and the Witch's Visit : Denise Bryer
- What the Smoke Said : George Layton
- Alice's Adventures in Wonderland (5) : Patricia Hodge
- The City of Lost Submarines (2) : David Tate
- Simon Rhymon : George Layton
- The Sunlight Falls Upon the Grass : Denise Bryer

Part 24

- Harlequin and Columbine (1) : Leonard Rossiter
- The City of Lost Submarines (3) : David Tate
- The Kind Scarecrow : Maureen O'Brien
- Seadna and The Devil : Anthony Jackson
- The Birthday Candle : Maureen O'Brien
- Superbabe : Anthony Jackson
- Upon My Golden Backbone : Maureen O'Brien

Part 25

- It Takes Time to Teach a King : Dermot Crowley
- Harlequin And Columbine (2) : Leonard Rossiter
- Cabbage and the Foxes : Carole Boyd
- The Donkey Who Fetched the Sea : Dermot Crowley
- Give It to Zico! (1) : Ian Lavender
- The Electric Imps : Carole Boyd
- If You Should Meet a Crocodile : Carole Boyd

Part 26

- The Mermaid Who Couldn't Swim : Maureen O'Brien
- Give It to Zico! (2) : Ian Lavender
- Mandy and the Space Race : Maureen O'Brien
- Somewhere Safe : Maureen O'Brien
- Noggin and the Money : Oliver Postgate
- Harlequin and Columbine (3) : Leonard Rossiter

=== Christmas Story Teller ===
Part 1

- Bertie's Escapade : Bernard Cribbins
- The Chocolate Soldier : Carole Boyd
- Timbertwig's Christmas Tree : George Layton
- King John's Christmas : Nigel Lambert
- Snow White and the seven Dwarfs : Liza Goddard
- Boo Ho Ho! : Bernard Cribbins
- What Wanda Wanted : Carole Boyd
- Aladdin and his Magic Lamp : George Layton
- The Great Sleigh Robbery : Nigel Lambert
- The First Christmas : Liza Goddard

Part 2

- Gobbolino's Christmas Adventure : Sheila Hancock
- Shorty and the Starship : Nigel Lambert
- Mole's Winter Welcome : Richard Briers
- Santa's Sunny Christmas : Miriam Margolyes
- Good King Wenceslas : Sheila Hancock
- Dick Whittington and His Cat : Richard Briers
- The Tale of the Little Pine Tree : Miriam Margolyes
- The Fairies' Cake : Miriam Margolyes
- Grogre and the Giant Nasher : Nigel Lambert
- A Christmas Carol : Joss Ackland

Part 3

Readers and singers: Derek Griffiths, Carole Boyd, Denise Bryer, Nigel Lambert, Steven Pacey, Claire Hamill, Tom Newman.

- Jingle Bells
- A Carol for Gobbolino
- Leroy Learns to Skate
- Snow
- Snow Song
- Mother Goose
- Christmas Fun
- Rudolph to the Rescue
- Away in a Manger
- I Saw Three Ships Come Sailing By
- Dotty and the Teddy Bears
- Clara and the Nutcracker Doll
- O Little Town of Bethlehem
- The Surprise Christmas
- The Forgotten Toys
- Minnie's Dinner Spell
- Morris's Christmas Stocking
- Hurray for Christmas!

=== Story Teller: Members' Edition ===
- Timbertwig and the Dancing Dress: Peet Ellison
- The Peacock and the Magpie: Caroline Usasz
- Pip the Water Drop: Jo Huysamen
- The Cloud Cook: Rebecca Harrison
- How Night Came: Fiona Botham
- The Twelve Dancing Princesses: Michael Sharmon
- Bubble & Squeek: Deborah Breen
- Zebra or Giraffe?: Chris Signore
- Friendship in the Park: Jo Huysamen
- The Battle of the Crabs: Antonio Pineda
- Odysseus: Nicola Ni Craith
- Lawton the Lion: Kathy Schmidt-Trajkovski

== In other languages ==
- Dutch "Luister Sprookjes en Vertellingen"
- German "Erzähl mir was"
- French "Raconte-moi des histoires"
- Italian "I Racconta Storie" and "C'era una volta" (re-edited with CDs instead of cassette tapes)
- Greek "Άμπρα Κατάμπρα" (Abracadabra) (re-edited 2007 with CDs instead of cassette tapes)
- Spanish "Cuenta Cuentos"
- Afrikaans "Storieman"
