= Manning–Kamna Farm =

Historic house in Oregon, United States

- Manning-Kamna Farm
- U.S. National Register of Historic Places
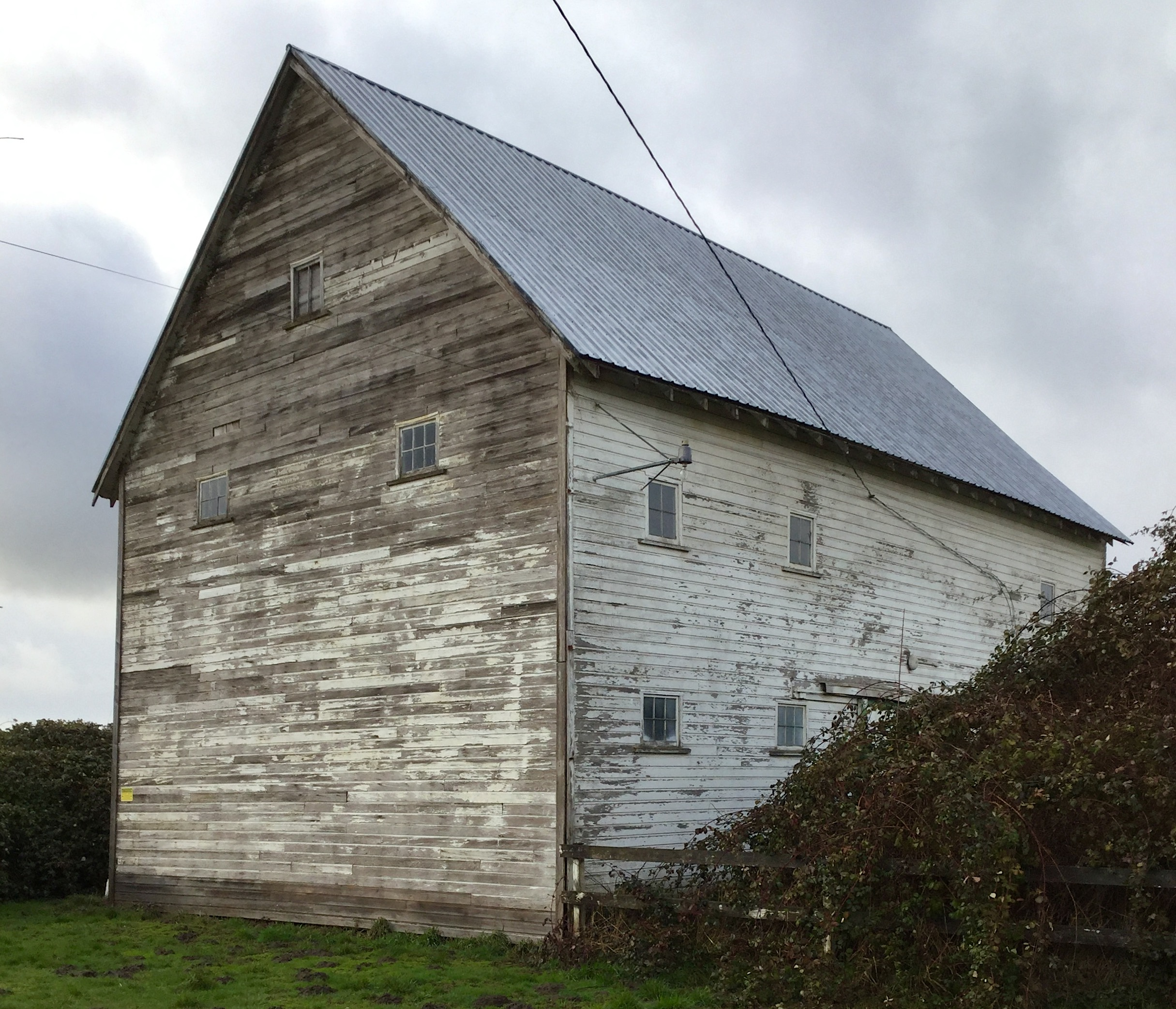
- Barn in 2023

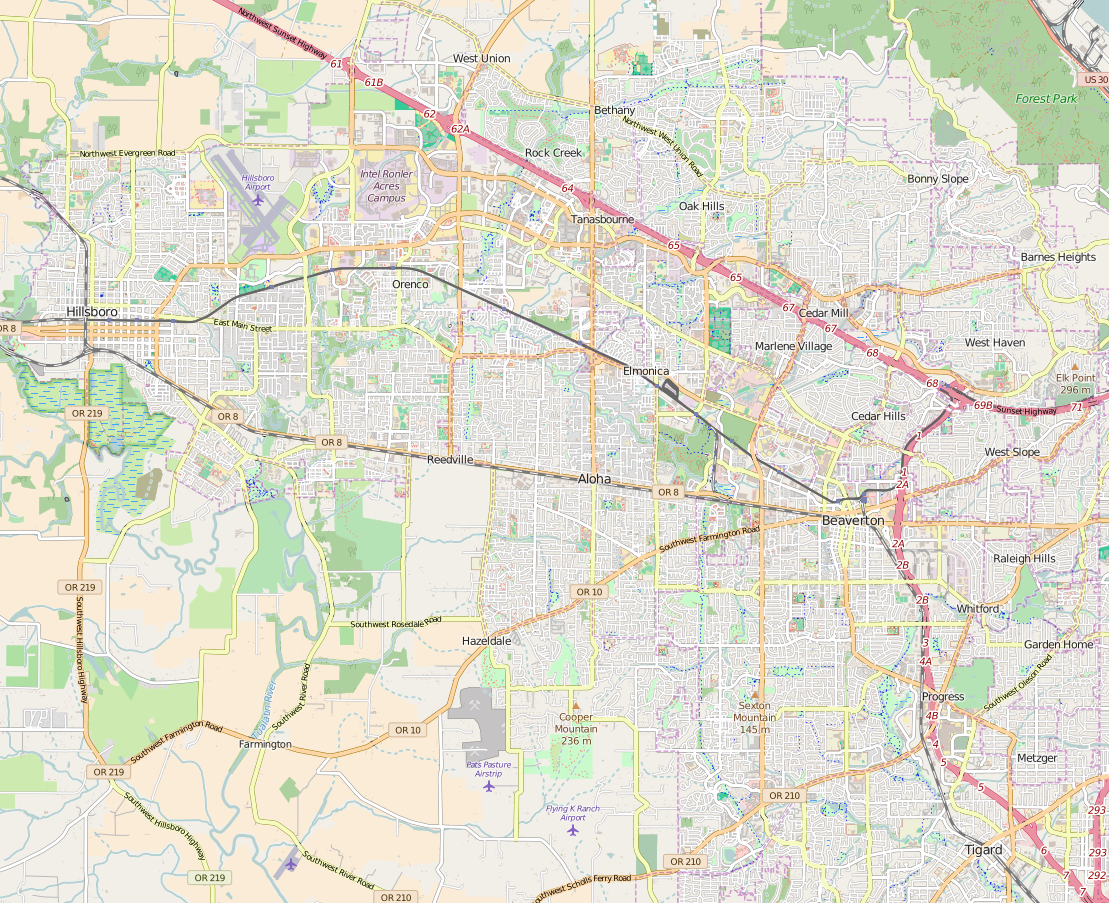
- Location within Hillsboro Beaverton OR Location within Oregon Location within the United States
- Location: Washington County, Oregon, USA
- Nearest city: Hillsboro, Oregon
- Coordinates: 45°33′1″N 122°58′45″W
- Built: 1880s to 1920s
- NRHP reference No.: 07001077
- Added to NRHP: October 10, 2007

The Manning–Kamna Farm is a private farm adjacent to Hillsboro in Washington County, Oregon, United States. Settled in the 1850s, ten buildings built between 1883 and 1930 still stand, including the cross-wing western farmhouse. These ten structures comprise the buildings added to the National Register of Historic Places in 2007 as an example of a farm in the region from the turn of the 20th century. Until the 1950s the farm was used to grow seeds, including rye grass and vetch. Listed buildings on the property include a barn, smokehouse, pumphouse, woodshed, and privy.

== History ==
Farming here began in 1851, when Carlos Dudley Wilcox and his wife Elizabeth settled a Donation Land Claim on the Tualatin Plains in Washington County, Oregon. Carlos had immigrated to the Oregon Country in 1847 with his parents and married the 15-year-old Elizabeth Scoggin on July 3, 1851. The couple had five children on their 640-acre (2.6 km^{2}) farm, though Carlos sold 62 acres (250,000 m^{2}) in 1857. In 1872, the Wilcoxes divorced, with Elizabeth gaining the southern part of the farm and Carlos the northern part, of which he sold half in 1874.

Elizabeth remarried on January 29, 1874, to native New Yorker Louis Manning. Manning, born in 1836, had previously lived in Kansas, Ohio, Colorado, and Eastern Oregon before settling in Washington County. On Elizabeth's 320-acre (1.3 km^{2}) farm, the two raised her children from the prior marriage and grew various crops. They built a new farmhouse on the property between 1876 and 1883. The Mannings also built a two-story barn on the farm in the early 1880s.

Herman Kamna (1870–1924) from Bassen, in what was then the Province of Hanover, in Germany (now Lower Saxony) immigrated to Washington County with his family in 1886. He married Anna Rehse on February 14, 1900, and the couple purchased 175 acres (0.71 km^{2}) from the Mannings in June 1903. The Mannings retained a life estate to a small portion of the farm that included the farmhouse, and remained on the farm until after Louis' death in 1910 and Elizabeth's in 1916. The Kamnas then moved into the farmhouse.

The Kamnas had four children, though one died in an accident at the farm at age three. One son, Edgar, in time took over the farming on the farm. About 1910 the Kamna family built an addition to the barn, and around 1920 built a second addition to the barn. They continued adding buildings to the farm in the early 1900s including a woodshed, privy, pumphouse, chicken coop, smokehouse, potato shed, and a canning shed. The last addition was a garage in the 1920s. In the 1920s the family added indoor plumbing to the farmhouse, and in the process enclosed parts of two porches. The Kamnas grew oats, fescue, rye grass, vetch, and sub-clover on the farm and used the barn for sorting and packing the seeds, running the farm into the 1950s. As of 2007 the farm was owned by Wayne Reed and Petrina Pometto. On October 10, 2007, the Manning–Kamna Farm was added to the National Register of Historic Places.

== Farmhouse ==
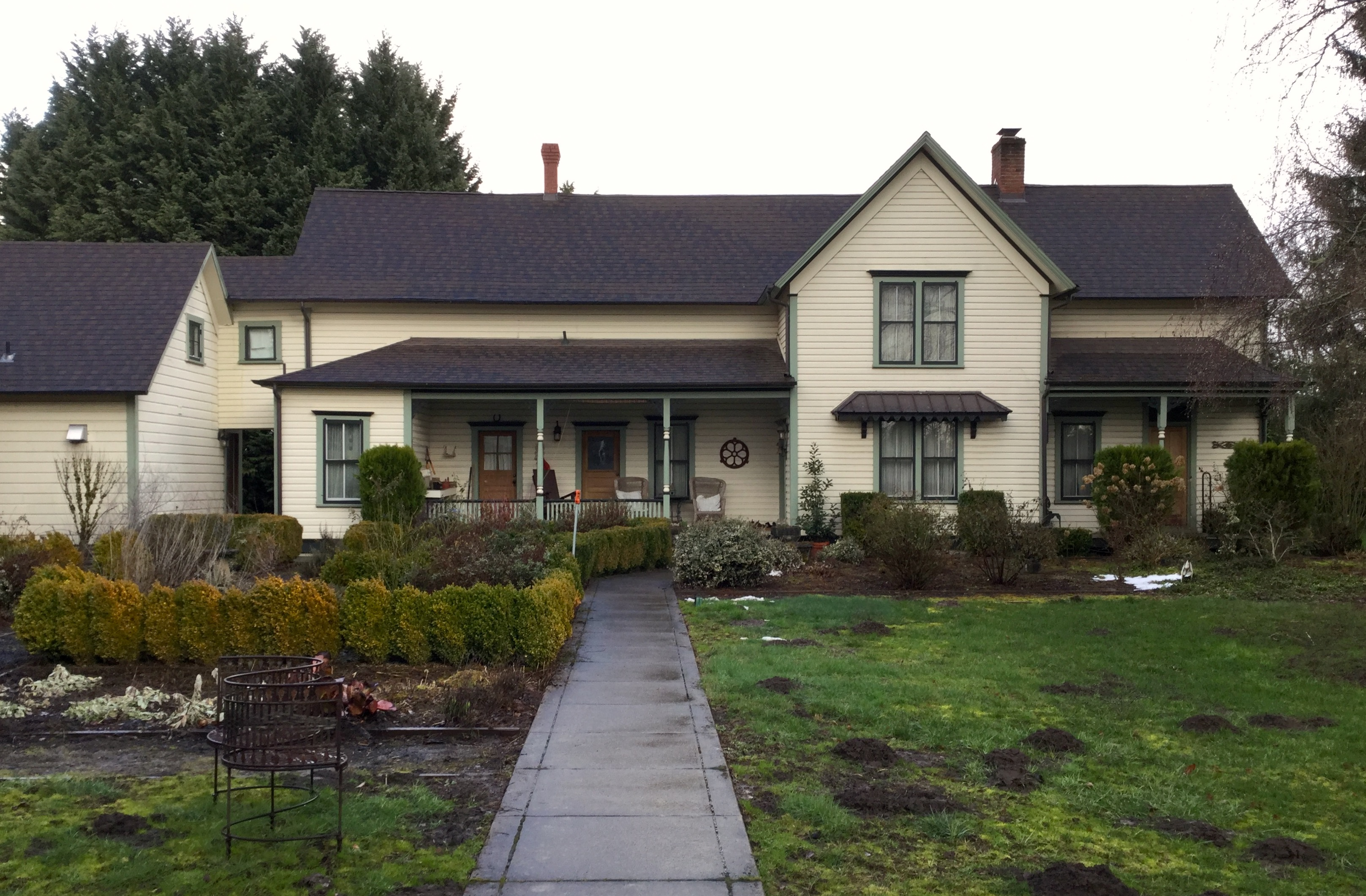
The farmhouse in 2023

Located along northwest Evergreen Road at Jackson School Road, the Manning-Kamna farm sits across the street from the city of Hillsboro. The largest and oldest building on the farm is the residence. Built as early as 1876 and as late as 1883, the house stands 1.5 stories tall and is of a late Victorian style in a cruciform shape. The cross-wing Western Farmhouse designed structure has a gabled roof (double Gabled-Ells) with four hip-roofed porches, one on each corner. The home is a wood-framed building that had a concrete foundation added in 2006. Materials include mainly Douglas-fir for the wood, and a composite shingle roof.

Details on the home include double hung windows, two chimneys, seven doors, and a catwalk that attaches to the neighboring woodshed. Architectural features include a corbelled chimney, crown moulding window casings, and on the porch are triangle shaped decorative wood brackets that are on top of the turned porch columns at the eaves. Inside, the main floor includes the kitchen, laundry room, a bathroom, the dining room, a parlor, foyer, a mud room, a fireplace room that features a Rumford fireplace. The second floor has a bathroom, a sewing room, and three bedrooms.

== Out buildings ==
The 2.22 acres (0.90 ha) farm has nine other buildings organized in a rectangular pattern, with the home in the middle, the barn to the west, and the privy on the eastern boundary. The original two-story barn is the oldest and largest of these remaining buildings, dating from the early 1880s. Built of hand hewn timber posts, it measures 35 feet (11 m) by 70 feet (21 m) and has white shiplap siding. The two newer barn buildings and the older portion form one interconnected building. These newer parts are one story tall, with the middle one measuring 20 feet (6 m) by 30 feet (9 m) and the northernmost 20 feet (6 m) by 20 feet (6 m). White board and batten siding was used on the middle portion that was built around 1910 and tongue and groove siding on the end section added about 1920. The barns were used for the seed growing operation of the farm.

Attached to the residence is the woodshed, or chop house, that stands one story tall and has a gabled roof. Built in the early 1900s by the Kamna family, it was remodeled in the 1970s and turned into a finished space complete with half-bath. The chicken coop was built about 1920 with an unfinished interior, and also has a gabled roof. The 12.5-foot (3,800 mm) by 20-foot (6,100 mm) structure has a dirt floor and shiplap siding. The potato shed also features the shiplap siding and gabled roof. Measuring 16 feet (4,900 mm) by 22 feet (6,700 mm), the concrete floored structure was built circa 1910 and was used for storing crops.

The smallest structure is the privy, which is 6 feet (1,800 mm) by 8 feet (2,400 mm). It was used from about 1910 until the 1950s. Inside were three holes, while outside was shiplap siding and a cedar shake roof. The pumphouse featured a brick foundation and brick lined well. Built about 1910, it is a wood-frame structure with a hip roof of composition shingles. The well was used for irrigation on the farm.

Also built around the same time was the smokehouse which had a dirt floor. Measuring 8.5 feet (2,600 mm) by 10.5 feet (3,200 mm), it has white shiplap siding and a cedar shake roof on the exterior. The canning shed on the property is the only brick structure. Built in the late 19th century, it was used for canning, food storage, and summer kitchen. Measuring 14 feet (4.3 m) squared (1.3 m^{2}), it also has a hipped roof which features a wooden ventilation chimney at the apex. The exterior of the brick is covered with stucco.

The newest building on the farm is the garage that was built in the 1920s. It has a gabled roof, exposed rafter tails, weatherboard siding, and composition singles. Located between the farmhouse and the barn, it measures 24 feet (7 m) by 16 feet (5 m) and has a 10-foot (3 m) wide double-car garage door on the south side. There is a single window on both the east and west ends of the building. A large Pignut Hickory and Black Walnut trees shade the garage.
