= The Fox and the Golden Egg =

Slovak fairy tale

The Fox and the Golden Egg is a Slovak fairy tale. It is included in Czech, Moravian, and Slovak Fairy Tales.

The crow that lays golden eggs has taken an arrow and is dying. She calls out to the animals of the forest to care for her three remaining eggs.

The bear that comes to collect the first egg carelessly crushes it in her paw on her way to her cave and eats it. The second egg is taken by an eagle who drops it on her way to her nest.

The last egg is taken by the fox who the crow does not trust as foxes love to eat eggs. But the fox is the only one who carefully curls her tail around the egg and carries it safely to her den where she cares for it until it hatches.
