= Gobbolino, the Witch's Cat =

1942 children's novel by Ursula Moray Williams

- First edition (publ. George G. Harrap, 1942), illustrated by Williams
- Author: Ursula Moray Williams
- Publisher: George G. Harrap,
- Publication date: January 1, 1942

Gobbolino, The Witch's Cat is a children's novel by Ursula Moray Williams, published by George G. Harrap in 1942 with illustrations by the writer. It has been published with new illustrations more than once and a 70th anniversary edition of the self-illustrated version was published in the Puffin Modern Classics series. It has also been issued in abridged versions, sometimes retitled "Gobbolino the kitchen cat".

In 1984 Puffin published The Further Adventures of Gobbolino and the Little Wooden Horse, a joint sequel to Gobbolino and to Adventures of the Little Wooden Horse (1938).

The name 'Gobbolino' is from the Italian word for "little hunchback".

== Plot ==
Gobbolino is a little black kitten born in a witch's cave, high up on Hurricane Mountain. He has sparkling blue eyes and one white paw. This sets him apart from other witches' cats like his twin sister Sootica, who has pure black fur and green eyes. While his sister is eager to begin her training as a witch's cat, Gobbolino longs to be a humble kitchen cat and to have a loving human family of his own. Gobbolino tries to adjust to his life in the cave but fails to complete a single task set by his mistress. After being rejected as an assistant by every witch in the area, he is left abandoned.

Initially distraught, he soon realises that he can now pursue his own dreams, and embarks on a great adventure to seek out his heart's desire. He tries to be a normal kitchen cat, first at a farm, then an orphanage, then the mayor's house, but his magic always gets him into trouble. He becomes a show cat, but the other cats are jealous and reveal him as a witch's cat. He becomes a ship's cat for a brief period but returns to shore after using his magic to save the ship from a witch, making the sailors suspicious.

He is adopted by a sick princess, but when she is well again she leaves for boarding school without him, so he joins a Punch and Judy show as 'Toby the Dog', but a witch in the audience reveals him as a witch's cat. A knight finds him and gives him to a lady as a gift, but when Gobbolino tries to help the knight win over the Lady, he only causes more trouble. He leaves and is adopted by a woodcutter, but the woodcutter's great-granddaughter sells him to a pedlar-woman for a dress.

Finally accepting his magic, Gobbolino becomes the pedlar-woman's assistant, but his good heart and unwillingness to cause pain mean he fails at every task he is set. The pedlar-woman leaves him in the care of his sister, Sootica, and her mistress, but once again he is unable to complete his tasks. The witch puts a spell on him, removing his magical powers, and he finds his way back to the farm where he began his journey, his coat having faded to an unrecognisable tabby. Here, he finds his old friends welcome him back happily, and he becomes the farm's kitchen cat.

== Adaptations ==
The story of Gobbolino was adapted as a children's song by G. C. Westcott, and has been very popular in primary school music classes in Australia and New Zealand since appearing as song 9 on page 12 of the 1978 edition of Sing, a music curriculum programme of the Australian Broadcasting Corporation that included a radio programme, cassettes (now CDs) and an annual compilation of songs. The song consists of three verses and a chorus. The children's magazine Story Teller issued by Marshall Cavendish publishing in the UK in 1983 had Gobbolino stories faithful to the original books. The magazine came with an accompanying cassette for a read along which was narrated by British actress Sheila Hancock.

== Editions ==
- ISBN 0-7534-1209-8 (paperback, 2005)
- ISBN 0-7534-0630-6 (hardback, 2001)
- ISBN 0-14-030239-5 (paperback, 1969)
