= Dutch brick (disambiguation) =

Dutch brick is brick made in the Netherlands, and an architectural style of building in brick. The term may also refer to:

- Dutch brick (stabilized earth block), a colloquial term for bricks made from compressed and stabilized earth
- Dutch brick (well lining), a term used for trapezoidal bricks, typically made on-site, used to line wells in developing countries

== See also ==
- Dutch bond
