= Aviana gens =

Ancient Roman family

The gens Aviana was an ancient Roman family. They are known chiefly from the letters of Cicero, who was a friend of Gaius Avianus Flaccus, during the first century BC. There was also a writer of Fables by this name, who lived about AD 400, although it is not certainly known that they were related.

== Members ==
This list includes abbreviated praenomina. For an explanation of this practice, see filiation.

- Gaius Avianus Flaccus, an intimate friend of Cicero's. He and his two sons seem to have been engaged in the farming of the public taxes.
- Gaius Avianus C. f. Flaccus, recommended twice by Cicero; in 52 BC to Titus Titius, one of the legates of Pompeius, who had the management of the corn-market, in accordance with the law which conferred the superintendence of it upon Pompeius; and again in 47, to Aulus Allienus, the proconsul of Sicily.
- Marcus Avianus C. f. Flaccus, together with his brother, Gaius, recommended by Cicero to Aulus Allienus, the proconsul of Sicily, in 47 BC.
- Avianus, a writer of fables, thought to have lived around AD 400. He wrote in Latin, and is thought to have been a pagan at the time when pagans were becoming an increasingly persecuted minority in the Empire. His work still survives, and was popular in the Middle Ages.

== See also ==
- List of Roman gentes
