= The Bulls and the Lion =

Fable by Aesop

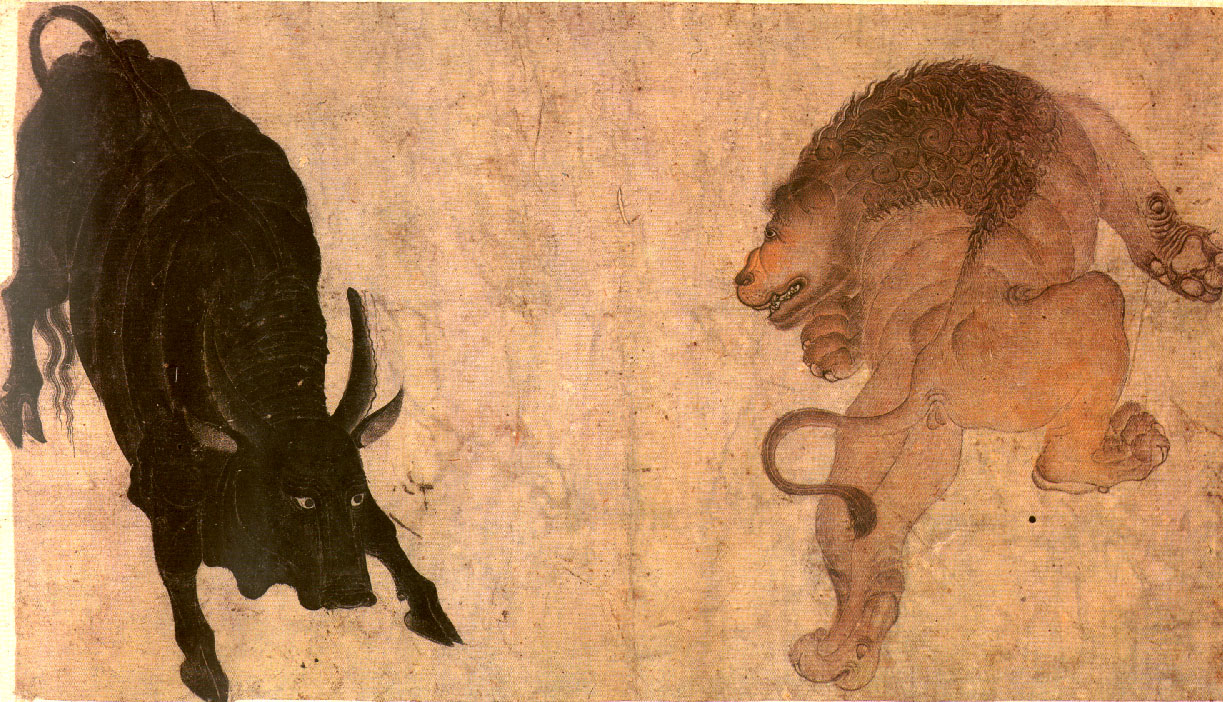
The lion scouts his isolated victim, from a 15th-century Central Asian album

The bulls and the lion is counted as one of Aesop's Fables and is numbered 372 in the Perry Index. Originally it illustrated the theme of friendship, which was later extended to cover political relations as well.

== The fable ==
A lion keeps watch on a field in which two, three or four bulls are grazing. Knowing that they will group together to defend each other, the lion sows enmity between them so that they separate and he is able to kill them one by one. Early versions of the fable are in Greek, beginning with Babrius, and there is a later latinised version by Avianus. In the 4th century CE, the rhetorician Themistius introduced a variant in which it is a fox that brings discord so that the lion can profit from it.

The moral given the story was generally to distrust a foe and hold fast to friends, but in the Syntipas version it was later given a political turn: "This fable shows that the same is true of cities and people: when they are in agreement with one another, they do not allow their enemies to defeat them, but if they refuse to cooperate, it is an easy matter for their enemies to destroy them." A similar sentiment was taken up in the collection illustrated by the English artist Francis Barlow in 1665, where the story is applied to state alliances. The lesson of holding fast to an alliance against the common foe was later repeated in a poem often reprinted during the American War of Independence, where there are 13 bulls in the field, the number of states in revolt.

A much longer poem, praising friendship and describing how the fox brings division among the bulls through lies and flattery, accompanied the fable of "The Four Bulls" in Thomas Bewick's illustrated edition of 1818. The poem had been taken from the series written by John Hawkesworth under the pseudonym H. Greville in The Gentleman's Magazine in 1741. There the fable had been incorporated as one element in a didactic poem titled "The Whisperer".
