= The Mischievous Dog =

Aesop's fable

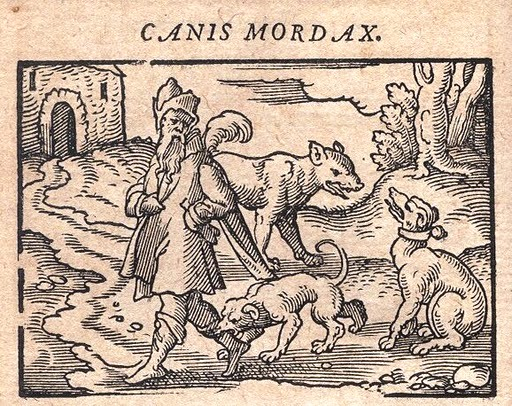
The Mischievous Dog (here called 'the dog that bites') in Phryx Aesopus Habitu Poetico by Hieronymus Osius, 1574

The Mischievous Dog is one of Aesop's Fables, of which there is a Greek version by Babrius and a Latin version by Avianus. It is numbered 332 in the Perry Index. The story concerns a dog that bites the legs of others. Its master therefore ties a bell around its neck to warn people. The dog, thinking the bell is a reward, shows it off in the streets until an older dog reminds him that the bell is not a reward but a sign of disgrace. Victorian editors of the fables supplied the moral that 'notoriety is often mistaken for fame'.

The Russian fabulist Ivan Krylov's story of "The Ass" is said to take its beginning from this fable. In his version, an ass is given a bell so that it can be traced if it wanders off. The ass is at first proud of what it takes to be a decoration but then finds that when it grazes in people's fields or gardens the bell identifies its presence and it is driven off. Krylov gives his story the moral that rank proves injurious to rogues by calling attention to them.
