= Avianus =

Roman author of fables

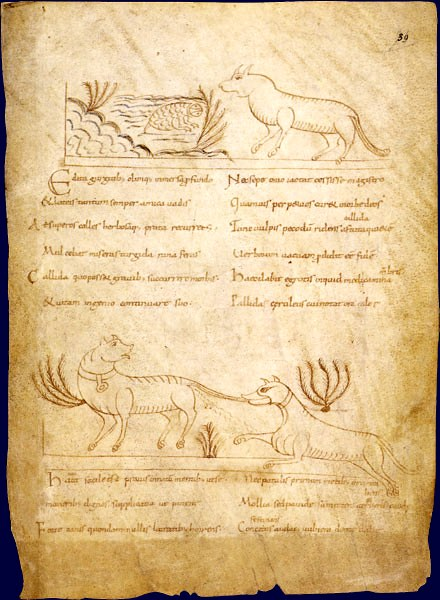
10th-century manuscript of Avianus' fables: The Frog Physician and The Mischievous Dog

Avianus (or possibly Avienus; c. AD 400) was a pagan writer of fables in Latin.

The 42 fables which bear his name are dedicated to a certain Theodosius, whose learning is spoken of in most flattering terms. He may possibly be Macrobius Ambrosius Theodosius, the author of Saturnalia; some think he may be the emperor of that name. Nearly all the fables are to be found in Babrius, who was probably Avianus's source of inspiration, but as Babrius wrote in Greek, and Avianus speaks of having made an elegiac version from a rough Latin copy, probably a prose paraphrase, he was not indebted to the original. The language and metre are on the whole correct, in spite of deviations from classical usage, chiefly in the management of the pentameter. The fables soon became popular as a school-book. Promythia and epimythia (introductions and morals), paraphrases, and imitations were frequent, such as the Novus Avianus of Alexander Neckam (12th century).

== Fables ==
1. De nutrice et infanti
2. De testudine et aquila - noticed under The Tortoise and the Birds
3. De cancris - noticed under The Snake and the Crab
4. De vento et sole - The North Wind and the Sun
5. De asino pelle leonis induto - The Ass in the Lion's Skin
6. De rana et vulpe - The Frog and the Fox
7. De cane qui noluit latrare - The Mischievous Dog
8. De camelo
9. De duobus sociis et ursa - The Bear and the Travelers
10. De calvo
11. De ollis - The Two Pots
12. De thesauro
13. De hirco et tauro
14. De simia
15. De grue et pavone
16. De quercu et harundine - The Oak and the Reed
17. De venatore et tigride
18. De quattuor iuvencis et leone - The Bulls and the Lion
19. De abiete ac dumis - The Fir and the Bramble
20. De piscatore et pisce - The fisherman and the little fish
21. De luscinia
22. De cupido et invido
23. De Baccho - noticed under The Statue of Hermes
24. De venatore et leone
25. De fure et parvo
26. De leone et capella
27. De cornice et urna - The Crow and the Pitcher
28. De rustico et iuvenco
29. De viatore et fauno - The Satyr and the Traveller
30. De apro et coco
31. De mure et tauro
32. De pigro Tyrinthium frustra orante - God helps those who help themselves
33. De ansere ova aurea pariente - The Goose That Laid the Golden Eggs
34. De cicada et formica - The Ant and the Grasshopper
35. De simiae gemellis
36. De vitulo et bove
37. De leone et cane
38. De pisce et focis
39. De milite veterano - noticed under The Trumpeter Taken Captive
40. De pardo et vulpe
41. De olla cruda
42. De lupo et haedo

== Editions ==
- Hendrik Cannegieter (1731)
- Lachmann (1845)
- Wilhelm Fröhner (1862)
- Emil Baehrens in Poetae Latini Minores (1879–1883)
- Robinson Ellis, The Fables of Avianus (1887)
- The Fables of Avianus, translated by David R. Slavitt, Johns Hopkins University Press 1993

== See also ==
- Aviana gens
