= The Goose that Laid the Golden Eggs =

Aesop's fable

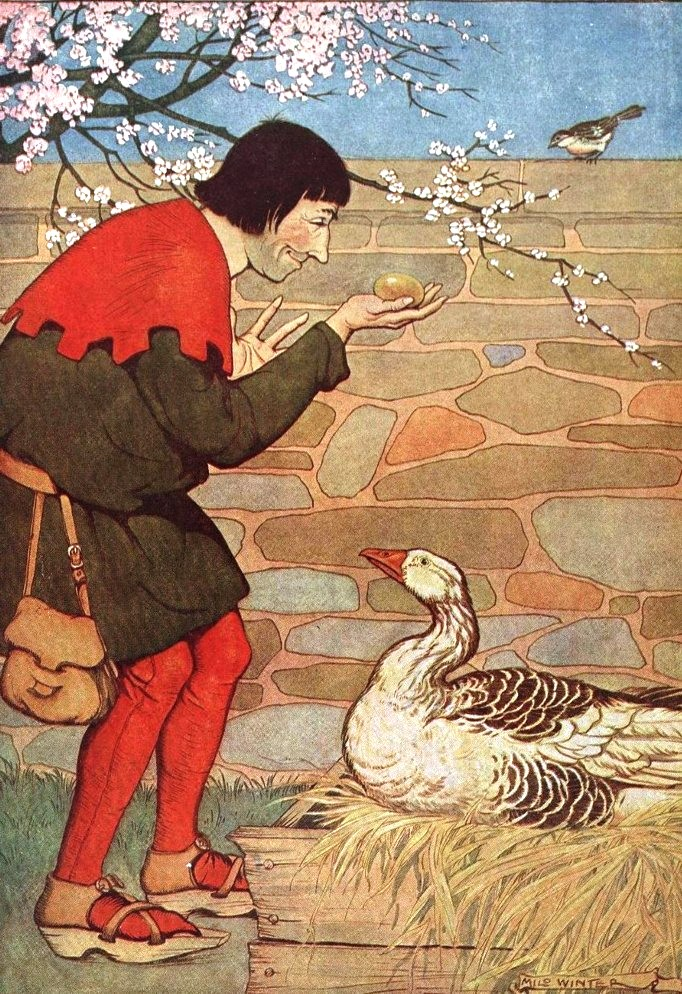
The Goose that Laid the Golden Eggs, illustrated by Milo Winter in a 1919 edition

"The Goose that Laid the Golden Eggs" is one of Aesop's Fables, numbered 87 in the Perry Index, a story that also has a number of Eastern analogues. Many other stories contain geese that lay golden eggs, though certain versions change them for hens or other birds that lay golden eggs. The tale has given rise to the idiom 'killing the goose that lays the golden eggs', which refers to the short-sighted destruction of a valuable resource, or to an unprofitable action motivated by greed.

== Story and moral ==
Avianus and Caxton tell different stories of a goose that lays a golden egg, where other versions have a hen, as in Townsend: "A cottager and his wife had a Hen that laid a golden egg every day. They supposed that the Hen must contain a great lump of gold in its inside, and in order to get the gold they killed [her]. Having done so, they found to their surprise that the Hen differed in no respect from their other hens. The foolish pair, thus hoping to become rich all at once, deprived themselves of the gain of which they were assured day by day."

In early tellings, there is sometimes a commentary warning against greed rather than a pithy moral. This is so in Jean de La Fontaine's fable of La Poule aux oeufs d'or (Fables V.13), which begins with the sentiment that 'Greed loses all by striving all to gain' and comments at the end that the story can be applied to those who become poor by trying to outreach themselves. It is only later that the morals most often quoted today began to appear. These are 'Greed oft o'er reaches itself' (Joseph Jacobs, 1894) and 'Much wants more and loses all' (Samuel Croxall, 1722). It is notable also that these are stories told of a goose rather than a hen.

The English idiom "Kill not the goose that lays the golden egg", sometimes shortened to "killing the golden goose", derives from this fable. It is generally used of a short-sighted action that destroys the profitability of an asset. Caxton's version of the story has the goose's owner demand that it lay two eggs a day; when it replied that it could not, the owner killed it. The same lesson is taught by Ignacy Krasicki's different fable of "The Farmer":

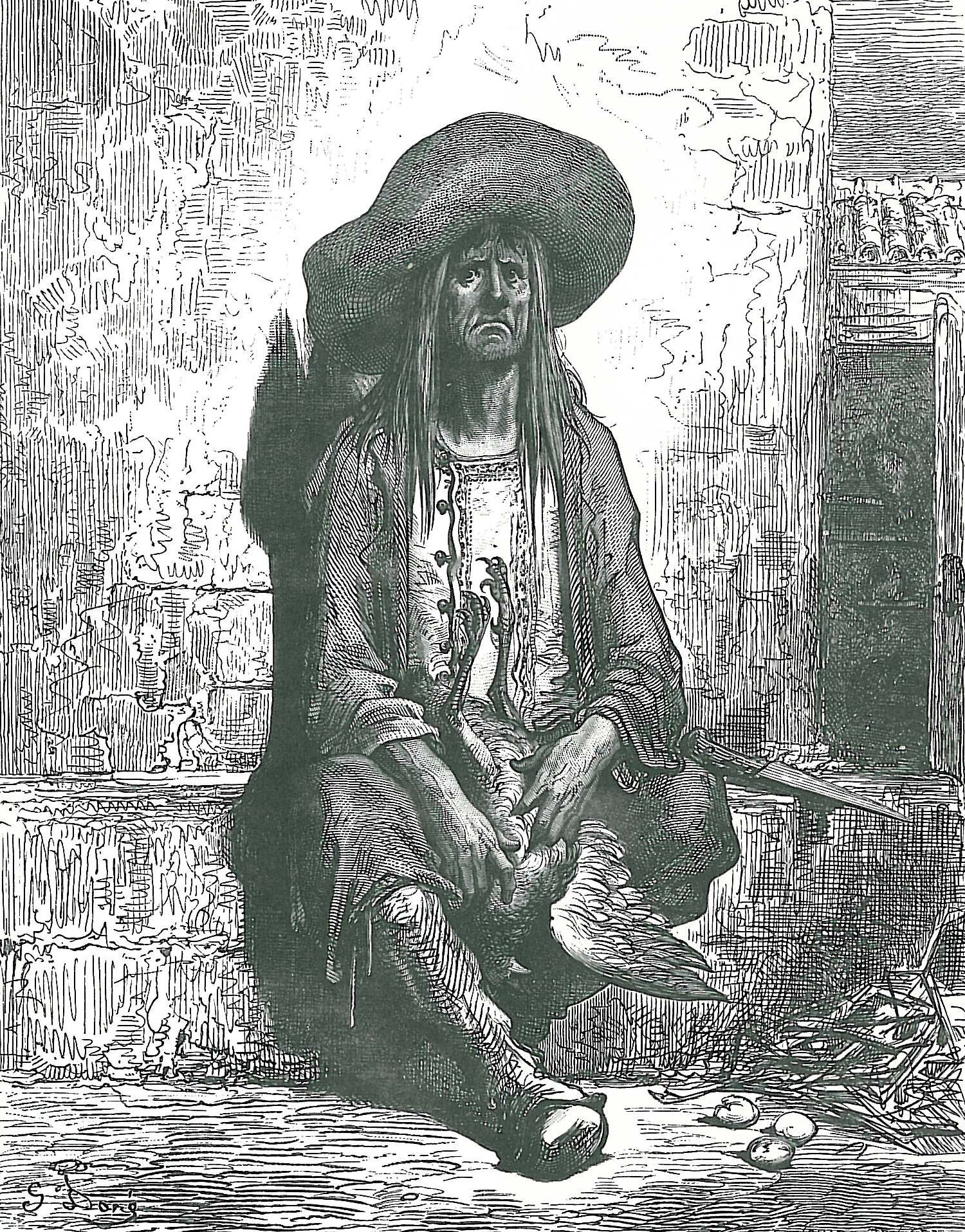
illustration for Jean de La Fontaine's fables by Gustave Doré

A farmer, bent on doubling the profits from his land,
Proceeded to set his soil a two-harvest demand.
Too intent thus on profit, harm himself he must needs:
Instead of corn, he now reaps corn-cockle and weeds.

There is another variant on the story, recorded by Syntipas (Perry Index 58) and appearing in Roger L'Estrange's 1692 telling as "A Woman and a Fat Hen" (Fable 87): A good Woman had a Hen that laid her every day an Egg. Now she fansy'd to her self, that upon a larger Allowance of Corn, this Hen might be brought in time to lay twice a day. She try'd the Experiment; but the Hen grew fat upon't, and gave quite over laying. His comment on this is that 'we should set Bounds to our Desires, and content our selves when we are well, for fear of losing what we had.' Another of Aesop's fables with the moral of wanting more and losing everything is The Dog and the Bone.

== Eastern instances ==
An Eastern analogue is found in the Suvannahamsa Jataka, which appears in the fourth section of the Buddhist book of monastic discipline (Vinaya). In this the father of a poor family is reborn as a swan with golden feathers and invites them to pluck and sell a single feather from his wings to support themselves, returning occasionally to allow them another. The greedy mother of the family eventually plucks all the feathers at once, but they then turn to ordinary feathers; when the swan recovers its feathers they too are no longer gold. The moral drawn there is:

Contented be, nor itch for further store.
They seized the swan – but had its gold no more.

North of India, in the formerly Persian territory of Sogdiana, it was the Greek version of the story that was known. Among the 8th-century murals in Panjakent, in the western Sugdh province of Tajikistan, there is a panel from room 1, sector 21, representing a series of scenes moving from right to left where it is possible to recognize the same person first in the act of checking a golden egg and later killing the animal in order to get more eggs, only to understand the stupidity of his idea at the very end of the sequence. A local version of the story still persists in the area but ends differently with the main character eventually becoming a king.

In the Mahabharata a story is recounted of wild birds that spit gold, and were discovered by a man who soon strangled them "out of greed".

== Use in the arts ==
The French text was set as the fourth of Rudolf Koumans' Vijf fabels van La Fontaine for children's choir and orchestra (Op. 25 1968). Yassen Vodenitcharov (b. 1964) has created a chamber opera from the story (2004) and Vladimir Cosma included the poem as the ninth piece in Eh bien ! Dansez maintenant (2006), a light-hearted interpretation for narrator and orchestra in the style of a foxtrot.

The majority of illustrations of "The Goose that Laid the Golden Eggs" picture the farmer despairing after discovering that he has killed the goose to no purpose. It was also one of several fables applied to political issues by the American illustrator Thomas Nast. Captioned Always killing the goose that lays the golden eggs, it appeared in Harpers Weekly for March 16, 1878. There the picture of the baffled farmer, advised by a 'Communistic Statesman', referred to the rail strike of 1877. The farmer stands for the politically driven union members whose wife and children sorrow in the background.

Two postage stamps have also featured the fable. Burundi's 1987 set of children's tales uses Gustave Doré's picture of the despairing farmer holding the body of the slaughtered goose (see above). The fable later appears on the 73 pence value from a Jersey set celebrating the bicentenary of Hans Christian Andersen in 2005, although "The Goose that Laid the Golden Egg" never figured among his stories.
