= A Christmas Carol (1971 TV film) =

1971 animated film

- Ebenezer Scrooge as seen in the film
- Based on: A Christmas Carol by Charles Dickens
- Written by: Charles Dickens
- Directed by: Richard Williams
- Starring: Alastair Sim; Michael Hordern; Diana Quick; Joan Sims
- Narrated by: Michael Redgrave
- Music by: Tristram Cary
- Countries of origin: United States; United Kingdom; Canada
- Original language: English

Production
- Producers: Richard Williams; Chuck Jones
- Running time: 25 minutes
- Production company: Richard Williams Productions

Original release
- Network: ABC
- Release: December 21, 1971

A Christmas Carol is a British-American animated adaptation of Charles Dickens's 1843 novella. The film was broadcast on U.S. television by ABC on December 21, 1971, and released theatrically soon after. In 1972, it won the Academy Award for Best Animated Short Film. The film notably has Alastair Sim and Michael Hordern reprising their respective roles as Ebenezer Scrooge and Marley's ghost.

== Premise ==
In London, 1843, Ebenezer Scrooge is visited by the ghosts of Jacob Marley, Christmas Past, Present and Yet to Come to teach him the true spirit of the season. This adaptation includes scenes of miners and sailors singing carols that were left out in previous adaptations.

== Cast (voices) ==
- Alastair Sim as Ebenezer Scrooge
- Michael Redgrave as Narrator
- Michael Hordern as Marley's Ghost
- Diana Quick as Ghost of Christmas Past
- Joan Sims as Mrs. Cratchit/Old woman
- Paul Whitsun-Jones as Fezziwig/Old Joe
- David Tate as Fred/Charity Man
- Felix Felton as Ghost of Christmas Present
- Annie West as Belle
- Melvyn Hayes as Bob Cratchit
- Mary Ellen Ray as Mrs. Dilber
- Alexander Williams as Tiny Tim (uncredited)

== Production ==
A Christmas Carol was directed by Richard Williams and its visual style is also largely due to Ken Harris, credited as "Master Animator". It notably had Alastair Sim as the voice of Ebenezer Scrooge — a role Sim had previously performed in the 1951 live-action film Scrooge. Michael Hordern likewise reprised his 1951 performance as Marley's Ghost in the animated film. Michael Redgrave narrated the story and veteran Looney Tunes animator Chuck Jones served as executive producer. Williams' son Alexander Williams, then aged four, provided the voice for Tiny Tim.

Animation for the film was created by multiple pans and zooms and unexpected scene transitions. The visual style was inspired by 19th-century engraved illustrations of the original story by John Leech and the pen and ink renderings by illustrator Milo Winter that illustrated the 1930s editions of the book. The film's bleak mood and emphasis on darkness and shadows led some to consider it the most frightening of the many dramatizations of the Dickens classic.

== Reception ==
Originally produced as a 1971 television special, the quality of the animation on A Christmas Carol was considered so high that it was subsequently released theatrically, thereby rendering it eligible for Oscar consideration, and the film won an Academy Award for Best Animated Short Film one year later. Some industry insiders took issue that a short originally shown on television was given the award, and the Academy responded by changing its policy, disqualifying any future works initially shown on television.

Fred Guida writes that the film "is widely considered the best animated version" of the story, praising its animation, and noting that along with the return of Sim and Horden, "tribute is being paid to the (1951) film", noting the mannerisms of the animated Scrooge, and the deception of Old Joe being a "dead ringer for...(1951 performer) Miles Malleson". Despite criticising the short length, Guida cites the film as "one of the most faithful of all adaptations", noting it including scenes often left out of adaptations, in particular the Ghost of Christmas Present showing Scrooge how Christmas is celebrated on a remote lighthouse and on a ship at sea.

In 2019, Robert Keeling of Den of Geek called the film "well worth seeking out", praising the "surreal animation". He praises the "haunting visuals".

== See also ==
- List of Christmas films
- List of American films of 1971
- List of British films of 1971
- List of ghost films
- List of adaptations of A Christmas Carol
