= Nigel Lambert =

British actor (1944–2024)

- Born: 11 May 1944; Southend-on-Sea, Essex, England
- Died: 10 September 2024 (aged 80); Steyning, Sussex, England
- Education: Italia Conti Academy of Theatre Arts
- Occupation: Actor
- Years active: 1956–2021

Nigel Lambert (11 May 1944 – 10 September 2024) was an English actor. He is best known for his role as the narrator of the first series of the BBC comedy series Look Around You, as well as Merle Ambrose in the online role-playing game Wizard101.

== Life and career ==
Lambert was born in Southend-on-Sea, Essex on 11 May 1944. Acting from the age of 12, Lambert began his stage education at Arts Educational Trust School, Piccadilly. After a brief spell at the Italia Conti Stage School, he joined a repertory company in Cork before completing his training at RADA. This was followed by working in repertory theatre in Ireland and Northampton, as well as the Royal National Theatre. He then worked in radio and television, as well as being a member of Hatch End Players.

He appeared in the 1967 The Avengers episode entitled "The £50,000 Breakfast" as the second doctor.

Lambert played the role of athlete Ken Sparten in the 1969 SF/horror film Scream and Scream Again, and in more recent years provided the voice of Mr Curry in The Adventures of Paddington Bear television series and also Papa in the Dolmio pasta sauce puppet commercials.

He also appeared as Operative Chris Granger in the UFO episode "Computer Affair" and contributed extensively to the magazine partwork Story Teller published by Marshall Cavendish, consisting of a fortnightly magazine and a cassette tape featuring children's stories.

Lambert recorded over 50 BBC audiobooks.

In 1980, he played the character of Hardin in the Doctor Who story The Leisure Hive, in addition to providing the voice of the Priest Triangle in the 2021 episodes War of the Sontarans and Once, Upon Time. He played the computer operative in the first episode of Blake's 7, The Way Back (1978).

On 11 September 2024, it was announced that Lambert had died at the age of 80.
