= The Dog and the Shadow (painting) =

Painting by Edwin Landseer

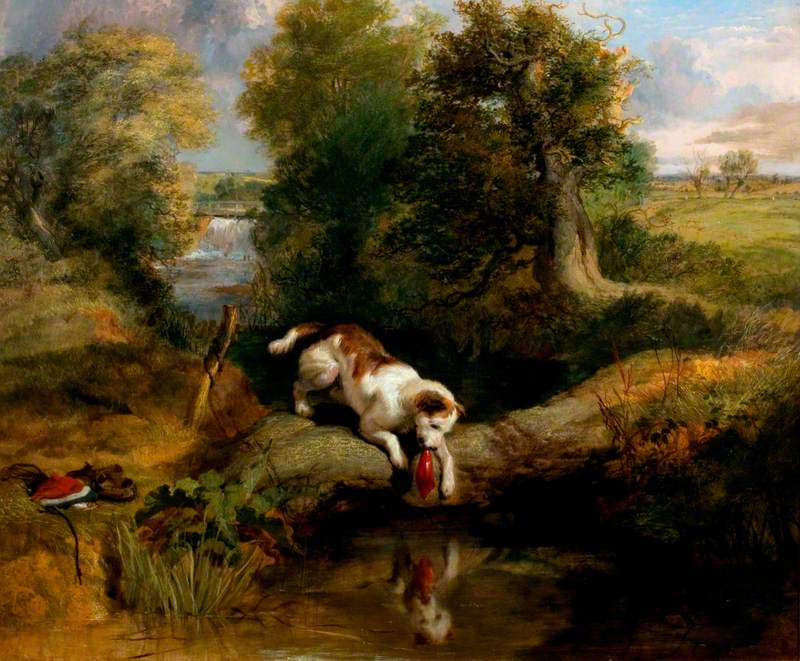
- Artist: Edwin Landseer
- Year: 1822
- Type: Oil on panel, genre painting
- Dimensions: 45.1 cm × 54.6 cm (17.8 in × 21.5 in)
- Location: Victoria and Albert Museum; London

The Dog and the Shadow is an 1822 genre painting by the British artist Edwin Landseer. Produced near the beginning of the painter's career, it is inspired by "The Dog and Its Reflection" one of Aesop's Fables.

The work was displayed at the British Institution's 1826 exhibition at Pall Mall. Today the painting is in the collection of the Victoria and Albert Museum in South Kensington, having been donated by the art collector Joseph Sheeksphanks in 1857 as part of the Sheepshanks Gift.

== Bibliography ==
- Donald, Diana. Picturing Animals in Britain, 1750-1850. Yale University Press, 2007.
- Ormond, Richard. Sir Edwin Landseer. Philadelphia Museum of Art, 1981.
- Roe, Sonia. Oil Paintings in Public Ownership in the Victoria and Albert Museum. Public Catalogue Foundation, 2008.
