= Barbara Árnason =

English-born Icelandic artist and illustrator (1911–1977)

- Born: Barbara Moray Williams; 19 April 1911; Petersfield, England
- Died: 1975 (aged 40–41)
- Education: Winchester College of Art; Royal College of Art
- Spouse: Magnús Á. Árnason (m. 1937)
- Relatives: Ursula Moray Williams (twin sister)

Barbara Moray Williams Árnason (19 April 1911 – 1975) was an English-born Icelandic artist, known for book illustrations, engravings in wood, and watercolours.

Born in Petersfield, she was the twin sister of writer and illustrator Ursula Moray Williams. She attended Winchester College of Art and the Royal College of Art. Soon after graduating she was asked to illustrate Icelandic sagas, which resulted in her travelling to Iceland in 1936, where she met sculptor and painter Magnús Á. Árnason. They married in 1937 and she moved to Iceland the same year.

She was already known as a book illustrator before moving to Iceland, and also became known there for pioneering work in wood engraving and for watercolours of landscapes and children. She also worked with textiles, and in her final years with water-colour engraving. In 1952, she painted a mural titled Children at Play in the assembly hall of the Melaskóli, a school in Reykjavík. She also created a large number of decorative plaques, some of which can still be seen near the school. She illustrated and designed covers for many children's books, but also illustrated the Passion Hymns of Hallgrímur Pétursson, which took her seven years.

The Gerðarsafn art museum in Kópavogur, which holds a collection of her work, held a centennial exhibition for her in 2011, the opening presided over by the President of Iceland, Ólafur Ragnar Grímsson. Work by her was also included in the exhibition Perspectives – On the Borders of Art and Philosophy at the Reykjavík Art Museum the same year.
