= The North Wind and the Sun =

Aesop's fable

The North Wind and the Sun is one of Aesop's Fables (Perry Index 46). It is type 298 (Wind and Sun) in the Aarne–Thompson folktale classification. The moral it teaches - the superiority of persuasion over force - has made the story widely known. It has also become a chosen text for phonetic transcriptions.

== Story and application ==
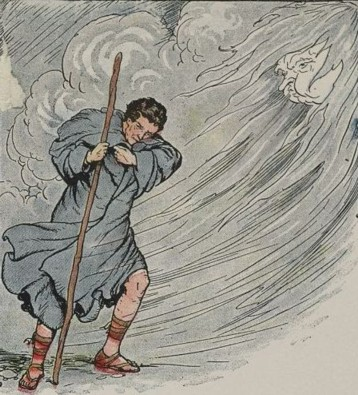
The wind attempts to strip the traveler of his cloak, illustrated by Milo Winter in a 1919 Aesop anthology

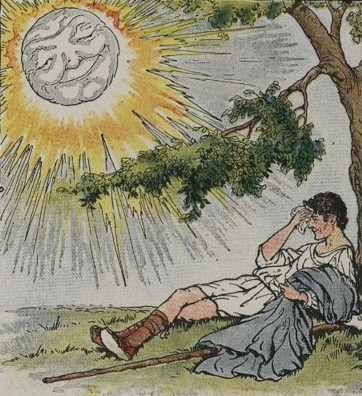
The Sun persuades the traveler to take off his cloak

The story concerns a competition between the North wind and the Sun to decide which is the strongest. The challenge was to make a passing traveler remove his cloak. However hard the wind blew, the traveler only wrapped his cloak tighter to keep warm, but when the Sun shone, the traveler was overcome with heat and soon took his cloak off.

The fable was well known in Ancient Greece; Athenaeus records that Hieronymus of Rhodes, in his Historical Notes, quoted an epigram of Sophocles against Euripides that parodied the story of Helios and Boreas. (Note: It related how Sophocles had his cloak stolen by a boy to whom he had made love. Euripides joked that he had had that boy too, and it did not cost him anything. Sophocles' reply satirises the adulteries of Euripides: It was the Sun, and not a boy, whose heat stripped me naked; as for you, Euripides, when you were kissing someone else's wife the North Wind screwed you. You are unwise, you who sow in another's field, to accuse Eros of being a snatch-thief.)

The Latin version of the fable first appeared centuries later in Avianus, as De Vento et Sole (Of the Wind and the Sun, Fable 4); early versions in English and Johann Gottfried Herder's poetic version in German (Wind und Sonne) named it similarly. It was only in mid-Victorian times that the title "The North Wind and the Sun" began to be used. In fact, the Avianus poem refers to the characters as Boreas and Phoebus, the divinities of the north wind and the Sun, and it was under the title Phébus et Borée that it appeared in La Fontaine's Fables (VI.3).

Gilles Corrozet, who had compiled a fable collection in French verse earlier than La Fontaine, twice featured the contest between the sun and the wind in his emblem books. In Hecatomgraphie (1540), the first of these, the story is told in a quatrain, accompanied by a woodcut in which a man holds close a fur cloak under the wintry blast while on the other side he strips naked beneath the sun's rays. It is titled with the moral "More by gentleness than strength" (Plus par doulceur que par force). The same illustration was used to accompany another poem in Corrozet's later Emblemes (1543), which counsels taking enjoyment and being careful as necessity demands, wisely adapting oneself to circumstances in the same way as one dresses differently for winter than for summer.

Victorian versions of the fable give the moral as "Persuasion is better than force", but it had been put in different ways at other times. In the Barlow edition of 1667, Aphra Behn taught the Stoic lesson that there should be moderation in everything: "In every passion moderation choose, For all extremes do bad effects produce". In the 18th century, Herder came to the theological conclusion that, while superior force leaves us cold, the warmth of Christ's love dispels it, and Walter Crane's limerick version of 1887 gives a psychological interpretation, "True strength is not bluster". But for Guy Wetmore Carryl in his humorous rewriting of the fable, "The Impetuous Breeze and the Diplomatic Sun", tact is the lesson to be learned. There the competition is between the man and the wind; the sun only demonstrates the right way of achieving one's end.

While most examples draw a moral lesson, La Fontaine's "Mildness more than violence achieves" (Fables VI.3) hints at the political application that was present also in Avianus' conclusion: "They cannot win who start with threats". There is evidence that this reading has had an explicit influence on the diplomacy of modern times: in South Korea's Sunshine Policy, for instance, or Japanese relations with the military regime in Myanmar.

== The fable in the arts ==
Jean Restout the Younger made a painting of La Fontaine's fable for the Hôtel de Soubise in 1738. This showed a traveller on horseback among mountains under a stormy sky. In his print of the same subject, Jean-Baptiste Oudry reversed the perspective to show the god riding a cloud chariot with the horseback traveller merely a small figure below. This too was the perspective of Gustave Moreau's 1879 watercolour in the series he painted of the fables. In modern times, the fable has been made into a 3-minute animated film for children by the National Film Board of Canada (1972). It also figured as part of a 1987 set of Greek stamps.

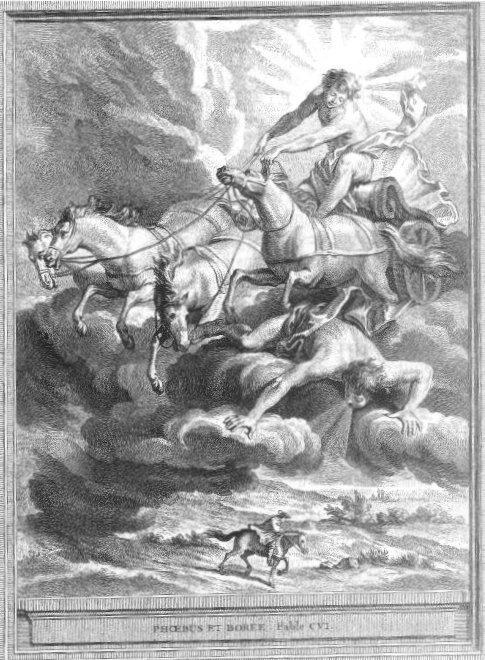
Jean-Baptiste Oudry's cosmic interpretation of La Fontaine's fable, 1729/34

The fable was the third of five in Anthony Plog's "Aesop's Fables" for narrator, piano and horn (1989/93); it is also one of the five pieces in Bob Chilcott's "Aesop's Fables" for piano and choir (2008). And, under the title "The Wind and the Sun", the English composer Philip Godfrey (b. 1964) has made a setting for children's choir and piano.

La Fontaine's Phébus et Borée was choreographed in 2006 by Karine Ponties as part of Annie Sellem's composite ballet production of La Fontaine's Fables as a 25-minute performance for a male and female dancer. Its creator has commented on the fable's theme that 'it demonstrates people's vulnerability to cosmic forces and the inner links there are between natural events and our life as humans.' But for the Scottish artist Jane Topping (b. 1972), who referenced "The North Wind and the Sun" in her 2009 installation, the fable is to be interpreted in the context of subliminal persuasion via images.

== Use in phonetic demonstrations ==
The North Wind and the Sun read in Received Pronunciation

The fable is made famous by its use in phonetic descriptions of languages as an illustration of spoken language. In the Handbook of the International Phonetic Association and the Journal of the International Phonetic Association, a translation of the fable into each language described is transcribed into the International Phonetic Alphabet. It is recommended by the IPA for the purpose of eliciting all phonemic contrasts that occur in English when conducting tests by foreign users or of regional usage. For example, the description of American English in the Handbook of the International Phonetic Association includes the following as a sample text:

Broad transcription
ðə ˈnoɹθ ˌwɪnd ən (ð)ə ˈsʌn wɚ dɪsˈpjutɪŋ ˈwɪtʃ wəz ðə ˈstɹɑŋɡɚ, wɛn ə ˈtɹævəlɚ ˌkem əˈlɑŋ ˈɹæpt ɪn ə ˈwoɹm ˈklok.
ðe əˈɡɹid ðət ðə ˈwʌn hu ˈfɚst səkˈsidəd ɪn ˈmekɪŋ ðə ˈtɹævəlɚ ˈtek ɪz ˈklok ˌɑf ʃʊd bi kənˈsɪdɚd ˈstɹɑŋɡɚ ðən ðɪ ˈəðɚ.
ðɛn ðə ˈnoɹθ ˌwɪnd ˈblu əz ˈhɑɹd əz i ˈkʊd, bət ðə ˈmoɹ hi ˈblu ðə ˈmoɹ ˈklosli dɪd ðə ˈtɹævlɚ ˈfold hɪz ˈklok əˈɹaʊnd ɪm;
ˌæn ət ˈlæst ðə ˈnoɹθ ˌwɪnd ˌɡev ˈʌp ði əˈtɛmpt. ˈðɛn ðə ˈsʌn ˈʃaɪnd ˌaʊt ˈwoɹmli, ənd ɪˈmidiətli ðə ˈtɹævlɚ ˈtʊk ˌɑf ɪz ˈklok.
ən ˈso ðə ˈnoɹθ ˌwɪnd wəz əˈblaɪʒ tɪ kənˈfɛs ðət ðə ˈsʌn wəz ðə ˈstɹɑŋɡɚ əv ðə ˈtu.
Narrow transcription (differences emphasized)
ðə ˈnɔɹθ ˌwɪnd ən ə ˈsʌn wɚ dɪsˈpjuɾɪŋ ˈwɪtʃ wəz ðə ˈstɹɑŋɡɚ, wɛn ə ˈtɹævlɚ ˌkem əˈlɑŋ ˈɹæpt ɪn ə ˈwɔɹm ˈklok.
ðe əˈɡɹid ðət ðə ˈwʌn hu ˈfɚst səkˈsidəd ɪn ˈmekɪŋ ðə ˈtɹævlɚ ˈtek ɪz ˈklok ˌɑf ʃʊd bi kənˈsɪdɚd ˈstɹɑŋɡɚ ðən ðɪ ˈʌðɚ.
ðɛn ðə ˈnɔɹθ ˌwɪnd ˈblu əz ˈhɑɹd əz hi ˈkʊd, bət ðə ˈmɔɹ hi ˈblu ðə ˈmɔɹ ˈklosli dɪd ðə ˈtɹævlɚ ˈfold hɪz ˈklok əˈɹaʊnd hɪm;
ˌæn ət ˈlæst ðə ˈnɔɹθ ˌwɪnd ˌɡev ˈʌp ði əˈtɛmpt. ˈðɛn ðə ˈsʌn ˈʃaɪnd ˌaʊt ˈwɔɹmli, ənd ɪˈmidiətli ðə ˈtɹævlɚ ˈtʊk ˌɑf ɪz klok.
ən ˈso ðə ˈnɔɹθ ˌwɪnd wəz əˈblaɪʒ tɪ kənˈfɛs ðət ðə ˈsʌn wəz ðə ˈstɹɑŋɡɚ əv ðə ˈtu.
Orthographic version
The North Wind and the Sun were disputing which was the stronger, when a traveler came along wrapped in a warm cloak.
They agreed that the one who first succeeded in making the traveler take his cloak off should be considered stronger than the other.
Then the North Wind blew as hard as he could, but the more he blew the more closely did the traveler fold his cloak around him;
and at last the North Wind gave up the attempt. Then the Sun shined out warmly, and immediately the traveler took off his cloak.
And so the North Wind was obliged to confess that the Sun was the stronger of the two.

The fable has also been proposed as a parallel text in comparative linguistics as it provides more natural and culturally inclusive language than the Lord's Prayer. In addition, impromptu tellings can indicate differences within languages such as dialects or national varieties. The example above, for instance, has shined where British English usage is shone. The previous IPA handbook transcribed shone for the Southern British and Scottish versions, but began to shine for the American English version. For an illustration of New Zealand English, the fable was replaced by "The Southerly Wind and the Sun" to make it geographically appropriate.

It has been criticized for its limitations in descriptive and acoustic research on varieties of English, and alternative passages like The Boy Who Cried Wolf have been suggested as replacements.
