= Ursula Moray Williams =

English children's author (1911–2006)

- Born: 19 April 1911; Petersfield, England
- Died: 17 October 2006 (aged 95); Tewkesbury, England
- Occupation: Author
- Spouse: Conrad Southey "Peter" John (m. 1935–1971)
- Children: 4
- Relatives: Barbara Árnason (sister)
- Writing career
- Genre: Children's books
- Notable works: Adventures of the Little Wooden Horse (1938); Gobbolino, the Witch's Cat (1942)

Ursula Moray Williams (19 April 1911 – 17 October 2006) was an English children's author of nearly 70 books for children. Adventures of the Little Wooden Horse, written while expecting her first child, remained in print throughout her life from its publication in 1939.

Her stories often involved brave creatures who overcome trials and cruelty in the outside world before finding a loving home. They included The Good Little Christmas Tree of 1943, and Gobbolino, the Witch's Cat first published the previous year. It immediately sold out but disappeared until re-issued in abridged form by Kaye Webb at Puffin Books twenty years later, when it became a best-seller.

== Life ==
Williams was born in Petersfield, Hampshire, by ten minutes the younger of identical twins. She and her sister Barbara Árnason were talented artists, and for six years from the age of ten wrote and illustrated books for each other's birthdays and at Christmas.

Both were enthusiastic Girl Guides, attending some of the movement's first camps, and some of Ursula's early books were collections of stories she had told to her own Brownie pack. The girls were also keen riders – on hobby horses at first. To save for a pony they kept goats, selling their milk which they refused to drink themselves.

Thanks to their uncle, the publisher Stanley Unwin, the twins visited the Alps, which later inspired some of Ursula's most vivid writing, most notably the trilogy that began with The Three Toymakers.

Williams's greatest source of ideas, however, was the house in which she spent her teenage years, North Stoneham House, a large, dilapidated mansion set in woodland north of Southampton. Events from her childhood recur repeatedly in her fiction, with North Stoneham described at greatest length in the 1941 A Castle for John-Peter and depicted in Faith Jaques' illustrations for Grandpapa's Folly and the Woodworm-Bookworm of 1974.

She was a friend of Puffin Books editor Kaye Webb, and organised riotous parties for the Puffin Club, of which she was the first honorary member. She worked with illustrators like Shirley Hughes, Faith Jaques and Edward Ardizzone.

Much of her later writing included disruptive, but essentially good-hearted children, and was influenced by her work as a juvenile magistrate and as a school governor. Locally, she was valued for her kindness and an instinctive Christian faith.

Personal problems, including her brother's threatened suicide, family crises, the death of her husband, the loss of an eye, and cancer, interrupted her work, but Williams went on writing until the age of 80, and achieved the longest published career of any children's writer of her generation.

She married Conrad Southey "Peter" John in 1935. They lived at Hampton, near Kingston upon Thames, then Esher, before moving to Gloucestershire in 1942, and Beckford, Worcestershire, in 1945. Peter died in 1971. They had four sons, three of whom survived her. She died in 2006 at Tewkesbury in Gloucestershire.

Many of Williams's manuscripts and further correspondence are held at Seven Stories, the Centre for Children's Books in Newcastle.

An exhibition, marking the centenary of her birth, opened in Winchester in April 2011.

== Books ==
- 1931 Jean-Pierre
- 1932 For Brownies: Stories and Games for the Pack and Everybody Else
- 1933 Grandfather
- 1933 The Pettabomination
- 1933 The Autumn Sweepers and Other Plays
- 1934 Kelpie, the Gipsies' Pony (Harrap), illustrated by Ursula and Barbara Moray Williams, OCLC 154294554
- 1934 More for Brownies
- 1935 Anders & Marta
- 1935 Adventures of Anne
- 1936 Tales for the Sixes and Sevens
- 1936 Sandy on the Shore
- 1936 The Twins and Their Ponies
- 1937 The Adventures of Boss and Dingbatt, as by Ursula John, photos by Conrad Southey John, OCLC 561792967
- 1937 Elaine of La Signe
- 1937 Dumpling
- 1938 Adventures of the Little Wooden Horse
- 1939 Peter and the Wanderlust; later called Peter on the Road
- 1939 Adventures of Puffin
- 1940 Pretenders; Island
- 1941 A Castle for John-Peter
- 1942 Gobbolino, the Witch's Cat
- 1943 The Good Little Christmas Tree
- 1946 The Three Toymakers
- 1946 The House of Happiness
- 1948 Malkin's Mountain – sequel to The Three Toymakers
- 1948 The Story of Laughing Dandino
- 1951 The Binklebys at Home
- 1951 Jockin the Jester – historical fiction
- 1953 The Binklebys on the Farm
- 1955 Grumpa
- 1955 Secrets of the Wood
- 1956 Goodbody's Puppet Show
- 1957 Golden Horse with a Silver Tail
- 1958 Hobbie
- 1958 The Moonball
- 1959 The Noble Hawks; U.S. title: The Earl's Falconer – historical fiction
- 1959 The Nine Lives of Island MacKenzie
- 1963 Beware of This Animal
- 1964 Johnnie Tigerskin
- 1964 O for a Mouseless House
- 1965 High Adventure
- 1967 The Cruise of the Happy-Go-Gay
- 1968 A Crown for a Queen
- 1968 The Toymaker's Daughter – sequel to The Three Toymakers Additional note: A previously unknown change in the ending of the book "The Toymaker's Daughter" was observed within the Pan Books LTD edition and the Meredith Press edition of the story. This textual deviation is noted to begin at chapter 15 and continue until the conclusion of the story*
- 1969 Mog
- 1970 Boy in a Barn
- 1970 Johnnie Golightly and his Crocodile
- 1970 The Three Toymakers
- 1971 Hurricanes – four volumes of short stories for backward readers
- 1972 A Picnic with the Aunts
- 1972 Castle Merlin
- 1972 The Kidnapping of My Grandmother
- 1972 Children's Parties (and Games for a Rainy Day)
- 1973 Tiger Nanny
- 1973 The Line
- 1974 Grandpapa's Folly and the Woodworm-Bookworm
- 1975 No Ponies for Miss Pobjoy
- 1978 Bogwoppit
- 1981 Jeffy, The Burglar's Cat
- 1982 Bellabelinda and the No-Good Angel
- 1984 The Further Adventures of Gobbolino and the Little Wooden Horse – sequel
- 1985 Spid
- 1986 Grandma and the Ghowlies
- 1987 Paddy on the Island

== Sources ==
- Davison, Colin (2011). Through the Magic Door: Ursula Moray Williams, Gobbolino and the Little Wooden Horse. Northumbria Press. ISBN 978-0-85716-007-2.
