= David Tate (actor) =

British actor

David Henderson-Tate (1937 – 1996) was a British actor of television and film and a voice actor who performed as David Tate. He is probably best known for his work in the original radio series of The Hitchhiker's Guide to the Galaxy (1978) and the television series The Hitchhiker's Guide to the Galaxy (1981).

== Early life and education ==
Born in 1937, Tate attended the Royal Academy of Dramatic Art (RADA), graduating with the academy's acting diploma program in 1958.

== Career ==
He made his television début as Marcel in the 'Toddler on the Run' episode of The Wednesday Play (1966), and played Basil Biggleswade in 'The Portsmouth Defence' episode of the same series later in the same year. He voiced Scrooge's nephew Fred and Charity Man in the Oscar-winning animated television special A Christmas Carol (1971) before playing Sgt. Tapling in 'The Secret of the Foxhunter' episode of the series The Rivals of Sherlock Holmes (1971). In 1975, he appeared in The Basil Brush Show and was Mr. Hawke in the television series Romance (1977). In 1978 he was the Commentator in the film International Velvet and voiced various roles in the original radio series of The Hitchhiker's Guide to the Galaxy (1978), including Eddie the Computer, Benjy Mouse, the Allitnils, and the Happy Vertical People Transporter, with Douglas Adams later saying of him that "He was one of the backbones of the series. We had him there every week." In 1981 Tate voiced Eddie and Benjy Mouse in the television series The Hitchhiker's Guide to the Galaxy, while 1982 saw him as Radio Voice in the series Solo. He was the TV Commentator in Never Say Die (1987). He provided various voices for the animated television series Dragonslayer Quark, Quark and the Long Winter and Quark and the Vikings (1987). Tate provided various additional voices for An American Tail: Fievel Goes West (1991) and The Ticker Talks (1995).

He narrated on Story Teller and was on the satirical radio current affairs sketch show Week Ending (1977).

== Death ==
Tate died in 1996 at the age of 58 or 59.

== Filmography ==
=== Film ===
Year	Title	Role	Notes
1978	International Velvet	Commentator	
1991	An American Tail: Fievel Goes West	Additional voices	

=== Television ===
Year	Title	Role	Notes
1966	The Wednesday Play	Marcel / Basil Biggleswade	2 episodes
1971	A Christmas Carol	Scrooge's Nephew / Charity Man	Television short
1971	The Rivals of Sherlock Holmes	Sgt. Tapling	Episode: "The Secret of the Foxhunter"
1977	Romance	Mr. Hawke	Episode: "Emily"
1981	The Hitchhiker's Guide to the Galaxy	Eddie / Benjy Mouse	3 episodes
1982	Solo	Voice / Radio Voice	2 episodes
1987	Never Say Die	TV commentator	Episode #1.5
