= The Tortoise and the Birds =

Fable of probable folk origin

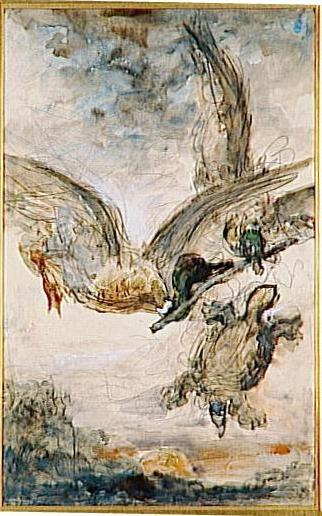
A water colour of La tortue et les deux canards by Gustave Moreau, 1879

The Tortoise and the Birds is a fable of probable folk origin, early versions of which are found in both India and Greece. There are also African variants. The moral lessons to be learned from these differ and depend on the context in which they are told.

== Early Indian versions ==
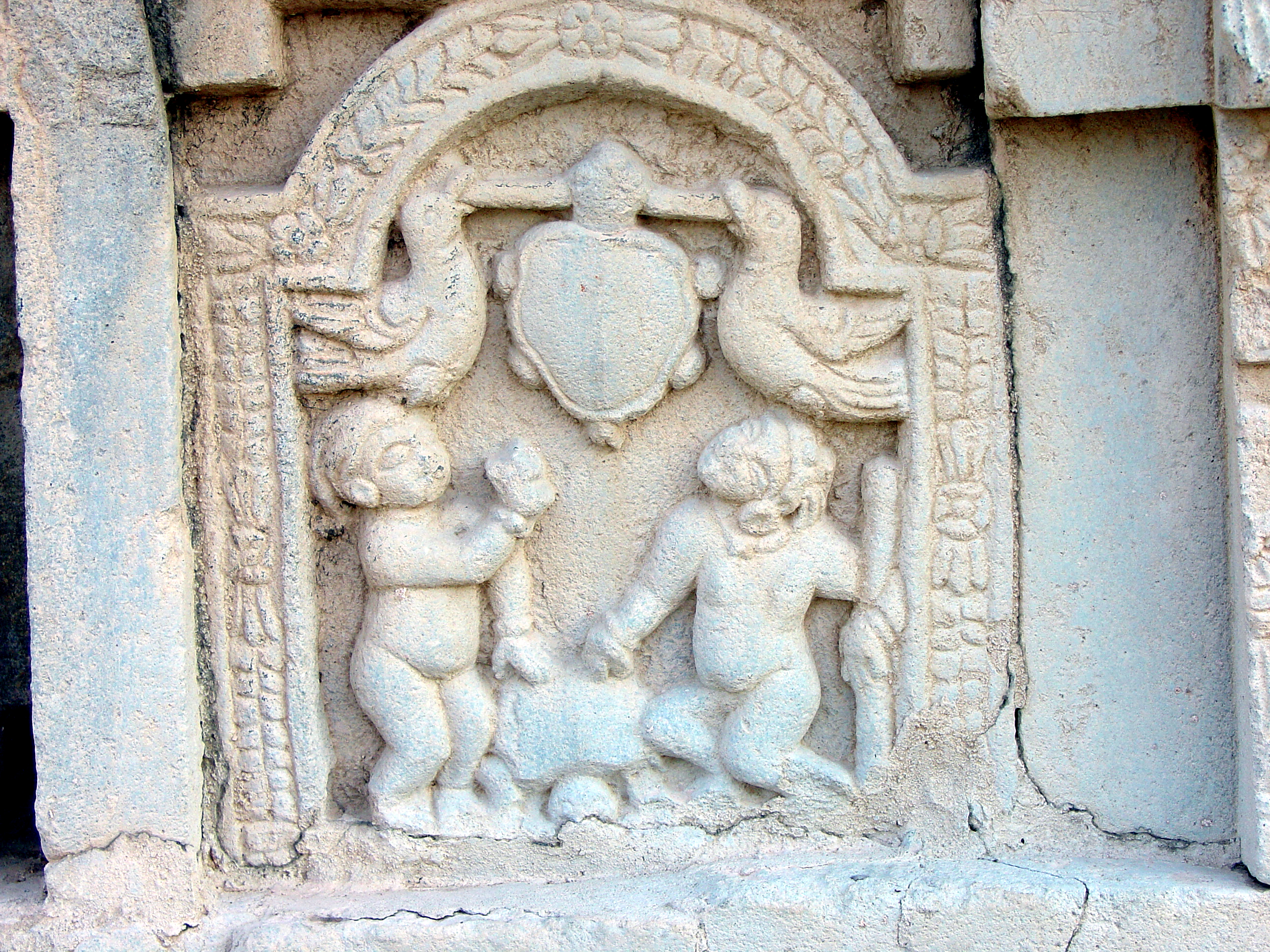
Nalanda Temple 2, 7th cent ce.

A tale concerning a talkative tortoise appears in the Buddhist scriptures as the Kacchapa Jataka. In this version, it is framed by the account of a talkative king who finds in his courtyard a tortoise that has fallen from the sky and split in two. His adviser explains that this had come about as a result of talking too much. A tortoise had become friendly with two geese who promised to take it to their home in the Himalayas. They would hold a stick in their beaks while the tortoise would grasp it in his mouth, but he must be careful not to talk. Children below made fun of it during the journey and when it answered back it fell to its destruction. Jataka tales were a favourite subject for sculpture and this story is found as a bas relief on various religious buildings in India and Java. Often depicted as synoptic narratives, the episodes encountered include the birds carrying the tortoise between them, its fall and its fate on reaching the Earth. In the 9th century Mendut temple in Java, for example, the birds and tortoise appear at top right, while on the ground huntsmen take aim with bows. Immediately below, the same three are preparing the fallen body for food.

As in the Mendut example, other versions of the story are depicted even in Buddhist contexts. In the Indian literary variation of the story in the Panchatantra, the tortoise and her friends live in a lake that is beginning to dry up. Pitying the future suffering of their friend, the geese suggest they fly off with her in the manner already described. On hearing the comments of people in the city they are passing, the tortoise tells them to mind their own business. After her fall in consequence, she is cut up and eaten. The story was eventually included in the tales of Bidpai and travelled westward via translations into Persian, Syriac, Arabic, Greek, Hebrew and Latin. The last of these began to be translated into other European languages at the end of the Middle Ages. A still later retelling appears in the Hitopadesha, where the migration occurs because of the appearance of a fisherman. Cowherds below suggest that the flying tortoise would make a good meal and it falls while making an acid response.

An Italian version of Bidpai's fables was early translated into English by Thomas North under the title of The Morall Philosophie of Doni (1570). The story of the tortoise and the birds appears in a section illustrating the sentiment that 'a man hath no greater enemy than himself'. The French fabulist Jean de la Fontaine also found the story in an early digest of Bidpai's work and added it to his fables as La Tortue et les deux Canards (X.3). For him the story illustrates human vanity and imprudence. His tortoise tires of living in the same place and decides to travel. Two ducks offer to fly her to America but, while on their way, she hears people below describe her as 'the queen of tortoises' and shouts agreement. It is on this that Alexander Sumarokov appears to have based his Russian version, in which the ducks set out to carry the tortoise to France.

Travelling eastwards too, the story exists as a Mongolian folk tale with a different animal character. In this variation, a frog is jealous of geese discussing their coming migration and complains that they are fortunate to be able to fly to a warmer climate in winter. The geese suggest the stick plan to the frog and they set off. The frog is so delighted with himself that he cannot resist shouting down to the frogs he is leaving behind and soon rejoins them disastrously.

A variation on this appears in the Russian author Vsevolod Garshin's story called "The Traveler Frog" (Лягушка-путешественница), which was adapted into a cartoon in 1965. There, the frog falls because it wants to tell those below that the traveling was its own idea, and not that of the ducks that carry him. Unlike in most variants, the frog falls into a pond and survives to boast of its supposed travels.

== Versions in Aesop's Fables ==
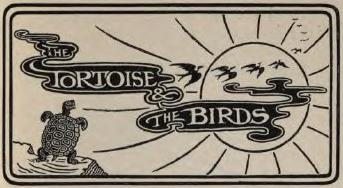
The fable's title, designed by Richard Highway for Jacobs' collection, 1894

There are two stories concerning a tortoise and various birds ascribed to Aesop, one in the Greek of Babrius and the other in the Latin of Phaedrus. In the Greek version, a tortoise yearns to see more of the Earth and persuades the eagle to fly up with it, promising in return 'all the gifts that come from the Eastern Sea'. Once they are above the clouds, the eagle drops it onto a mountaintop. The story was given the moral that one should be content with one's lot. It spread through Europe via Latin versions in the collections of Avianus and Odo of Cheriton. Thereafter it cross-fertilised with tellings of the Indian version of the fable. The tortoise's discontent is supplied to La Fontaine's fable from this source, as it is in Jefferys Taylor's poem The Tortoise.

Babrius gives no reason for the eagle's treachery; Avianus suggests that this was because the promised payment was not forthcoming. It is the uncertainty of life, into which treachery enters, that is the subject of the alternative version of the fable, told by Phaedrus as "The Eagle and the Crow" (2.6). It begins with the comment that 'no one is sufficiently well armed against the high and the mighty, and if there is a malicious advisor involved as well, then whoever falls victim to their criminal forces will be destroyed.' To illustrate this, he relates how an eagle has seized a tortoise but cannot eat it because of the protective shell. A passing crow advises the eagle to drop the animal 'from the starry heights' onto the rocks below, after which the two birds share its meat. By the time the story is retold by Walter of England an element of treachery has been added. The crow meets the frustrated eagle on the ground and advises it to soar up and drop its prey. Waiting behind by the rocks, the crow flies off with the fallen tortoise before the eagle can return.

== African fables ==
An Igbo fable concerning the tortoise and the birds has gained wide distribution because it occurs in the famous novel Things Fall Apart by Chinua Achebe. The tortoise, who is a West African trickster figure, hears of a feast to be given by the sky-dwellers to the birds and persuades them to take him with them, winged in their feathers. There he tells the hosts that his name is 'All-of-you' and, when they provide the food with the assurance that 'This is for all of you', claims the entire feast. The enraged birds claim their feathers back and leave. Only the parrot will agree to take a message to the tortoise's wife to pull the bedding from his house and leave it on the ground. Instead the parrot tells her to bring out all the hard things so that when the tortoise jumps down its shell is broken. He survives, however, and the broken shell is glued together. This provides the explanation of why the tortoise's shell is so uneven. Much the same story is now claimed by the Swazi people and the Kikuyu.

== Merged stories and adaptations ==
Some retellings of the tortoise fables are extended in such a way as to suggest that two stories have been merged into one. In the case of the African fable, the tortoise gets back to earth safely but the birds decide to play him a return trick. A feast is provided on the ground but it is announced that this can only be eaten by those whose claws are clean. The birds fly to the river and return to alight on their food but the tortoise, having to crawl, gets its feet dirty in returning and is sent back to try again. This time it is he who misses the feast.

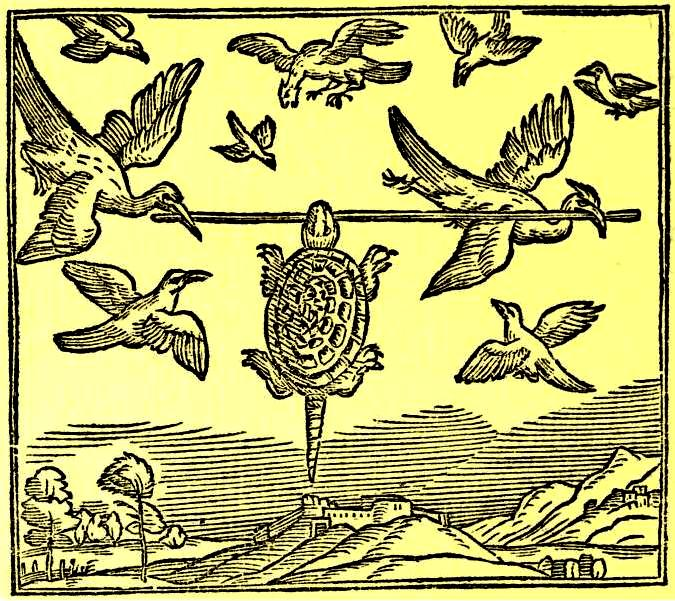
A woodblock from Thomas North's translation of Bidpai, 1570

In a Sri Lankan continuation of the Indian version of the fable, Ibba the tortoise similarly survives its fall to earth, only to get into the clutches of Nariya, the hungry jackal. Ibba suggests to Nariya that its shell will become soft if it is soaked in the river. At first Nariya keeps a paw on the shell but then Ibba persuades him that he is soft all over except for the dry patch under Nariya's paw. When the jackal raises it, Ibba swims to safety.

Other versions merge stories more seamlessly. A narration in the Uncle Remus tradition from the former slave population of South Carolina combines Aesop's fable of the discontented tortoise with an African cumulative tale. Brer Terrapin grumbles so much about being earth-bound that the animals conspire to have him carried up and dropped to his death. Miss Crow takes him first and when she grows tired he is transferred in turn to the back of a buzzard, a hawk and King Eagle. When the eagle will not listen to his pleas to take him back, the tortoise climbs down a thread he ties to the eagle's leg and so escapes his fate.

Joseph Jacobs similarly combines both fables of Aesop in his late retelling Here the eagle is carrying the tortoise to a new home and is reminded by the crow that it is good to eat, whereupon the eagle drops it on a sharp rock and the two birds make a feast of it. This synthetic version and the moral given it, 'Never soar aloft on an enemy's pinions', is often mistaken as authentic nowadays.
