= The Crow and the Pitcher =

Aesop's fable

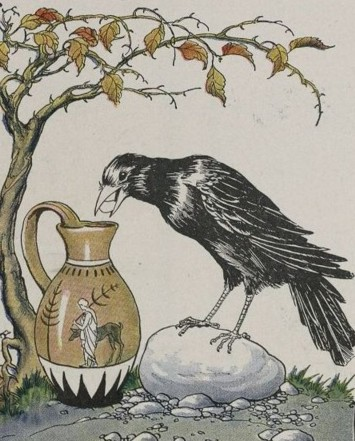
The Crow and the Pitcher, illustrated by Milo Winter in 1919

The Crow and the Pitcher is one of Aesop's Fables, numbered 390 in the Perry Index. It relates ancient observation of corvid behaviour that recent scientific studies have confirmed is goal-directed and indicative of causal knowledge rather than simply being due to instrumental conditioning.

== The fable and its moral ==
The fable is made the subject of a poem by the first-century-CE Greek poet Bianor, was included in the 2nd century fable collection of pseudo-Dositheus and later appears in the 4th–5th-century Latin verse collection by Avianus. The history of this fable in antiquity and the Middle Ages is tracked in A.E. Wright's Hie lert uns der meister: Latin Commentary and the Germany Fable.

The story concerns a thirsty crow that comes upon a pitcher with water at the bottom, beyond the reach of its beak. After failing to push it over, the bird drops in pebbles one by one until the water rises to the top of the pitcher, allowing it to drink. In his telling, Avianus follows it with a moral that emphasises the virtue of ingenuity: "This fable shows us that thoughtfulness is superior to brute strength." Other tellers of the story stress the crow's persistence. In Francis Barlow's edition the proverb 'Necessity is the mother of invention' is applied to the story while an early 20th-century retelling quotes the proverb 'Where there's a will, there's a way'.

Artistic use of the fable may go back to Roman times, since one of the mosaics that has survived is thought to have the story of the crow and the pitcher as its subject. Modern equivalents have included English tiles from the 18th and 19th centuries and an American mural by Justin C. Gruelle (1889–1978), created for a Connecticut school. These and the illustrations in books of fables had little scope for invention. The greatest diversity is in the type of vessel involved and over the centuries these have varied from a humble clay pot to elaborate Greek pitchers.

The fable was later set to music by Howard J. Buss as the fourth item in his "Fables from Aesop" (2002).

== The fable in science ==
The Roman naturalist Pliny the Elder is the earliest to attest that the story reflects the behaviour of real-life corvids. In August 2009, a study published in Current Biology revealed that rooks, a relative of crows, do just the same as the crow in the fable when presented with a similar situation.
