= Brick-lined well =

Hand-dug water well

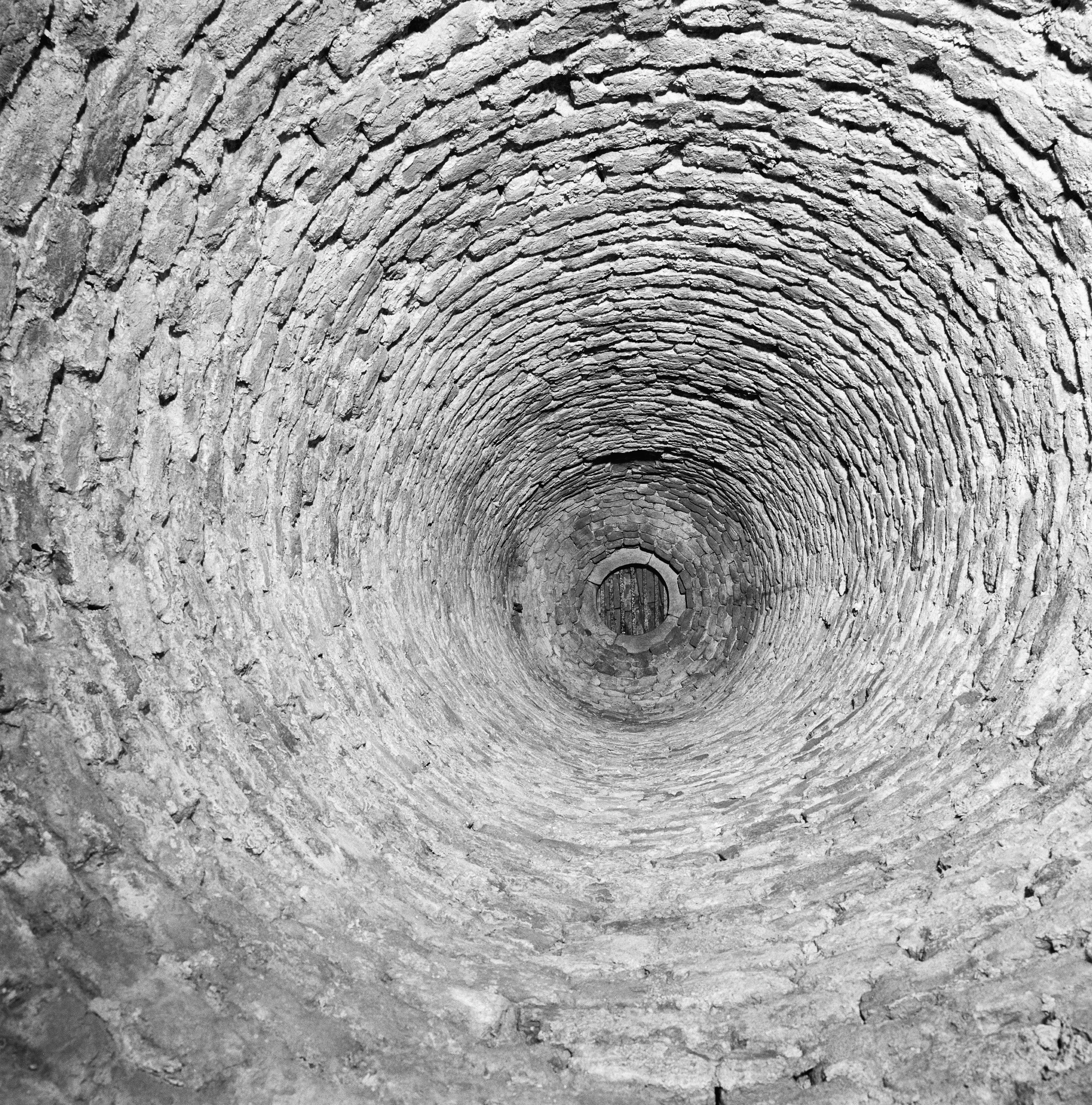
Interior of a brick-lined well in Utrecht, Netherlands

A brick-lined well is a hand-dug water well whose walls are lined with bricks, sometimes called "Dutch bricks" if they are trapezoidal or made on site. The technique is ancient, but is still appropriate in developing countries where labor costs are low and material costs are high.

== Antiquity ==
Hand-dug wells are mentioned in the Bible. Inscriptions in Mesopotamia tell of construction of brick-lined wells in the period before the rule of Sargon of Akkad (c. 2334 – 2279 BC). Brick-lined wells have been excavated at Mohenjo-daro and Harappa in the Indus Valley. Mature Harappan (2600–1900 BC) technology included brick-lined wells, perhaps derived from earlier designs. One well would have served a neighborhood. The clay bricks are trapezoidal in shape, with one end smaller than the other. The bricks are arranged in circles pointing inward. The smaller ends form the inside walls. In the settlement of Lothal a brick-lined building on an elevated mound included a well lined with baked bricks, a bathing facility and a drain.

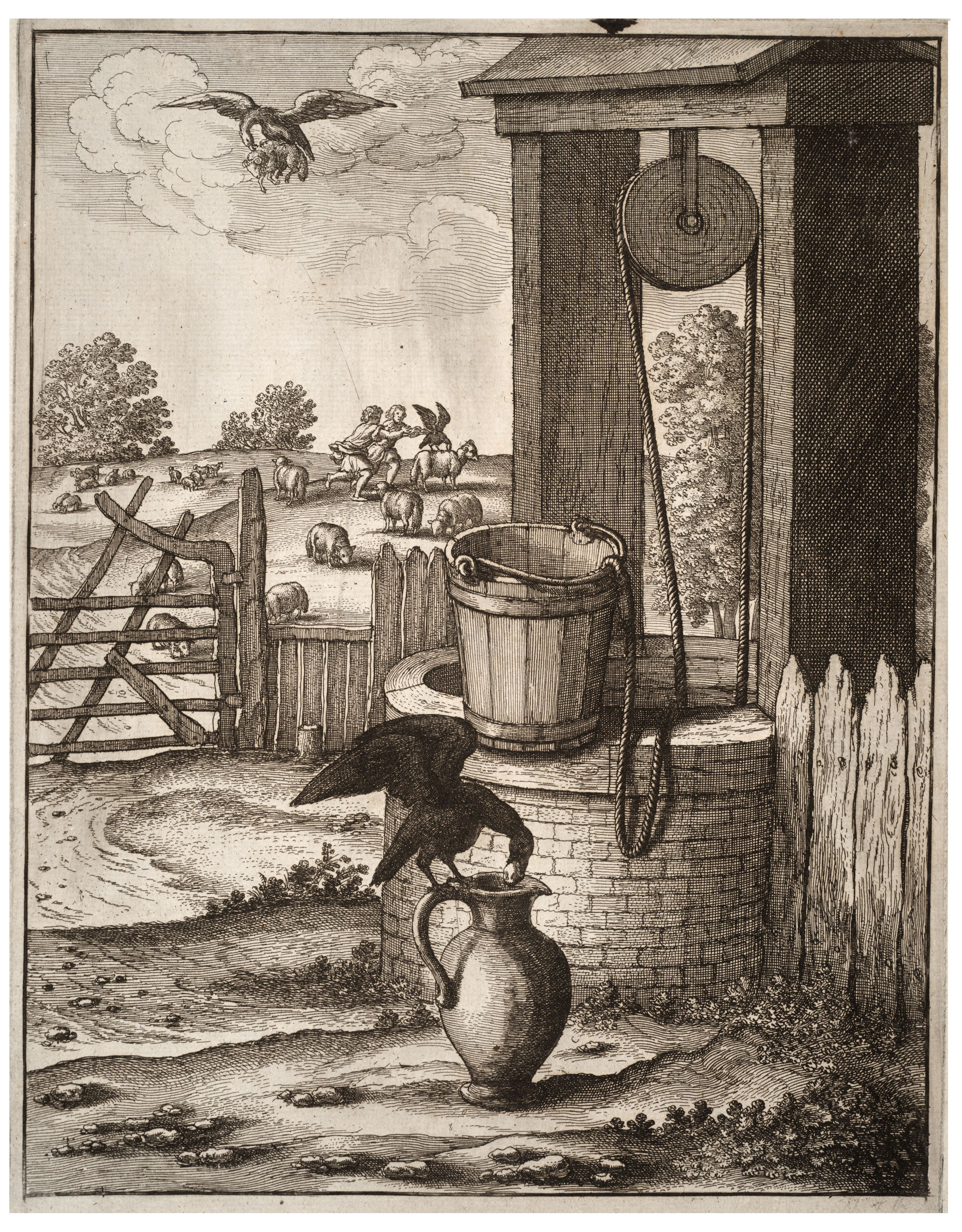
The Crow and the Pitcher by Wenceslaus Hollar (1607–1677)

Brick-lined wells of more recent date have been found around the world. They have been found in Sanjan, Gujarat, India, built around the 11th century AD. Archeological excavations in Virginia, USA, have found what appears to be a brick-lined well from the 17th century. Brick-lined wells were typical of 19th century farmsteads in rural Illinois. In the Shijiazhuang area of Hebei, China, irrigation using wells was highly developed before the Revolution. Five or six men could dig a brick-lined well with a depth of 7 to 10 metres (23 to 33 ft) in a week. This could irrigate crops over an area of up to 20 mu. (Note: In 1930 a mu in China covered 666.66 square metres (7,175.9 sq ft), so 20 mu would have been 13,333 square metres (143,520 sq ft)) The same men could dig an unlined well in one day, basically a pit in the ground, but the irrigation capacity was only one fifth of that of the brick-lined well.

== Comparison to other linings ==
In West Africa branches were traditionally used to line hand-dug wells, but this requires use of forest resources that are now often scarce. Old 55 US gallons (210 L; 46 imp gal) steel barrels can be used to make linings. These can be lowered from the surface as the well is dug and reduce risk when the well is sunk in sand, gravel or some other unstable formation. However, they corrode and deform easily. Cement brick linings are stronger, unlikely to deform, and the courses can be linked structurally. They are generally cost-effective, although more expensive than barrel linings.

Steel-reinforced wells are stronger again and can be sunk much deeper, but in developing countries their cost is usually prohibitive. Pre-cast concrete pipe is also an excellent liner, particularly if it has tongue-in-groove joints and a smooth exterior, since it can be used as a crib as the well is deepened. Again, cost may prohibit its use.

== Design ==
The brick lining will typically rest on a circular concrete well curb. The lining may have open joints to allow water to enter. In this case the well is often plugged at the bottom and the water enters from the sides. Ballast of 20 to 25 centimetres (7.9 to 9.8 in) diameter is packed around the outside of the lining to prevent sand from flowing into the well. This design may be used in gravel or coarse sand where the water table is shallow. Impervious wells are made using masonry with cement or lime mortar. They may be sunk 5 to 60 metres (16 to 197 ft) deep. Water seeps into a cavity in the open bottom, or comes up from a pipe sunk down from the center of the well into the water-bearing sand. The top part of the well should prevent foreign matter or surface water from entering the well, so should be impervious. The top of the well should be protected and the area around the well drained. The brick lining can greatly improve sanitation if it rises above ground level, preventing contamination of the well water by animal feces. (Note: An 1802 domestic encyclopedia, talking of clay bricks, stated that "the lining of wells with bricks, a practice very common in some places, is extremely improper, is it cannot fail to render the water hard and unwholesome." Modern sources do not mention this concern.)

== Peace Corps experience ==
A trapezoidal shape may be used for bricks made to line wells

By 2007 the U.S. Peace Corps had been promoting use of Dutch bricks to build soak pits and wells for many years. The Peace Corps uses the term "Dutch brick" to describe a trapezoidal (as opposed to rectangular) concrete brick used to line a well or soak pit. The brick may be made of a 1:2:3 mix of cement, sand and gravel. USAID has supported these efforts, for example providing funds to purchase materials such as cement and rebar for construction of Dutch brick wells in Mali and Mauretania. The Dutch bricks are used to reinforce the sides of the wells, with the concrete mixed onsite and packed into brick molds.

Dutch bricks made for well lining have a trapezoidal shape, with sloping sides so that they can be fitted into a ring. The slope can be adjusted for larger or smaller rings. Lining wells with Dutch bricks in this way allows the well to be dug deeper without fear of the walls collapsing. Problems may however be encountered with incorrectly shaped molds and inexperienced volunteers.
