= Carole Boyd =

British actress

- Education: Birmingham School of Speech and Drama
- Occupation: Actress
- Years active: 1966–present
- Known for: The Archers
- Spouse: Patrick Harrison (m. 1993)
- Awards: Audie Award for Best Female Narrator (1998)

Carole Boyd is a British actress. She has had a career in theatre, television and radio and plays Lynda Snell MBE in BBC Radio 4's The Archers. In 1998 she won the Audie Award for Best Female Narrator for her narration of Angela Huth's Land Girls.

== Career ==
Boyd trained at the Birmingham School of Speech and Drama, where she won the principal national prize for voice and in 1966 joined the Radio Drama Company by winning the Carleton Hobbs Bursary. She is primarily recognised for her work in television, with her portrayals of Hetty Wainthropp Investigates, Virtual Murder and Mrs Melly in Bodger & Badger among her appearances. Boyd has also performed many vocal roles for the BBC children's programme Postman Pat. Since 1991 she has voiced every woman and child in the franchise - including Sara Clifton, Dr Gilbertson, Mrs Goggins, Miss Hubbard, Mrs Pottage, Dorothy Thompson, Lucy Selby, Tom and Katy Pottage, Charlie Pringle and Julian Clifton (with the exception of Granny Dryden, who continued to be voiced by Ken Barrie prior to his death in 2016). In 2006 she played Esther Hartlieb in the film The Thief Lord.

== Personal life ==
Married to Patrick Harrison, Boyd has acted as part-time carer for her husband at their home in Shepperton since he suffered a stroke in 2003.
