= Adventures of the Little Wooden Horse =

1938 children's novel

- First edition cover
- Author: Ursula Moray Williams
- Illustrators: Joyce Lankester Brisley
- Publisher: George G. Harrap
- Publication date: January 1, 1938

Adventures of the Little Wooden Horse is a children's novel by Ursula Moray Williams, published by George G. Harrap in 1938 with illustrations by Joyce Lankester Brisley. Early editions of the novel were illustrated by Brisley; later illustrators include Peggy Fortnum and Paul Howard. It was most recently published in 2011 by Macmillan Publishers, who also included it in the Kingfisher Modern Classics series.

== Plot ==
The book contains 19 chapters. The little wooden horse is a toy horse originally intended to be sold by his maker Uncle Peder. His only desire is to stay with and serve his maker but when the latter is forced out of business by the availability of cheaper mass-produced toys he becomes ill through poverty. The little wooden horse then sets out into the world to make himself a fortune for the two of them to live in peace. Through a combination of misfortune and exploitation, the little wooden horse is forced to travel a great distance and earn and lose his fortune through each of the chapters. Eventually, he does hold onto a fortune, but returning home he finds his maker has disappeared. Eventually, they are reunited through a chance and highly emotional meeting.
