= Milo Winter =

American book illustrator

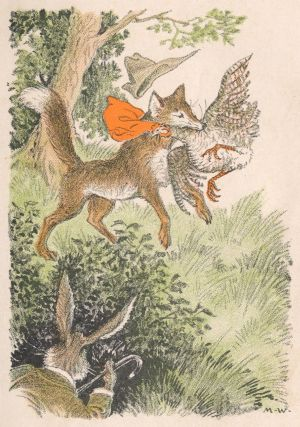
Brushtail grabs a big Plymouth Rock hen by the neck, illustration for Doctor Rabbit and Brushtail the Fox by Thomas Clark Hinkle.

Milo Winter (August 7, 1888 – August 15, 1956) was an American book illustrator. He created editions of Aesop's Fables, Arabian Nights, Alice in Wonderland, A Christmas Carol, Gulliver's Travels, Tanglewood Tales (1913), and others.

== Background ==
Winter was born in Princeton, Illinois and trained at Chicago's School of the Art Institute. He lived in Chicago until the early 1950s, when he moved to New York City. From 1947 to 1949, he was the art editor of Childcraft books and from 1949, was the art editor in the film strip division of Silver Burdett Company.

== Gallery ==
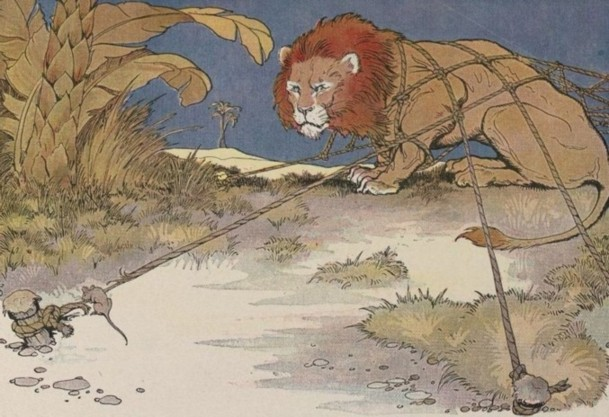
The Lion and the Mouse, illustrated by Milo Winter in The Æsop for Children, 1919 Aesop anthology

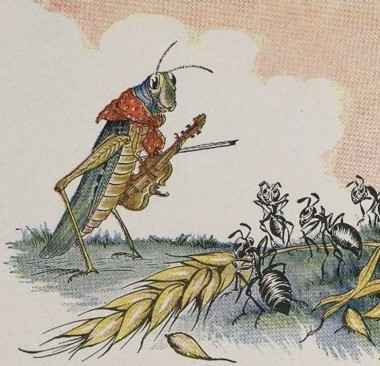
The Ant and the Grasshopper, illustrated by Milo Winter in The Æsop for Children

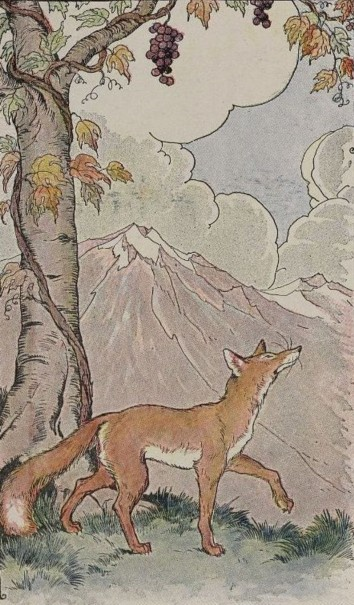
The Fox and the Grapes, illustrated by Milo Winter in The Æsop for Children

== See also ==
- A Christmas Carol (1971 film)
