= Michael Earl (puppeteer) =

American puppeteer (1959–2015)

- Born: September 10, 1959; Oakland, California, U.S.
- Died: December 23, 2015 (aged 56); Los Angeles, California, U.S.
- Other name: Mike Davis
- Occupation: Puppeteer
- Years active: 1977–2015

Michael Earl (September 10, 1959 – December 23, 2015) was an American puppeteer. A four-time Emmy Award-winner whose credits include Mr. Snuffleupagus on Sesame Street (1978–1981) and Dr. Ticktock in Ticktock Minutes, a musical series of PSA's on PBS he also co-created, scripted and wrote lyrics for that garnered 11 Southern Regional Emmys, a 1998 National Emmy for Best Public Service Announcements, a Gabriel Award, two Parents' Choice Awards and numerous other honors. Earl performed the original Shrek character in a motion-capture development test film for DreamWorks and puppeteered lead characters in Paramount Pictures' Team America: World Police.

== Early life and career ==
Michael Earl (Davis) was born on September 10, 1959, in Oakland, California and grew up in San Leandro and Livermore, CA. He began his professional career at age 5 acting in a Curad bandage TV commercial. Two years later he was tapped to be the original "Is It Soup Yet?" kid for Lipton, which ran for three years. He performed original puppet shows from ages 10–17, and on weekends during his high school years, Earl was an apprentice at Children's Fairyland Puppet Theater in Oakland, CA, which Frank Oz's father (Mike Oznowicz) sometimes visited.

At 17, he attended a puppetry festival where he met Kermit Love, who spoke to Jim Henson (as did Oznowicz) about the young puppeteer. At 18 he moved to New York City and acted in some TV commercials, as well as landing a puppeteering job working for his childhood idol, Bil Baird. At 19, Earl was hired sight-unseen by Jim Henson for The Muppet Movie and subsequently won the role of Mr. Snuffleupagus on Sesame Street (replacing Jerry Nelson, the originator), also creating the roles of Forgetful Jones, Oscar the Grouch's pet worm Slimey the Worm, Poco Loco, Polly Darton and the Honkers. His other Muppet credits include The Muppets Take Manhattan, John Denver and the Muppets: A Christmas Together, Little Muppet Monsters, The Muppets: A Celebration of 30 Years, The Jim Henson Hour, Sesame Street's 20th Anniversary Special and Dinosaurs. Earl also appeared (as a puppet Alien) opposite Will Smith and Tommy Lee Jones in Men in Black II.

Earl mentored and/or coached many TV and film puppeteers, including Drew Massey, Kevin Carlson, Camille Bonora and James Murray. He served as a puppetry consultant to entertainment companies such as MCA/Universal Pictures, Warner Bros. and Disney, working one-on-one with the Vice President of Disneyland Entertainment to conceive, develop and write puppet- and non-puppet live events, including Haunted Passages on the RMS Queen Mary in Long Beach, California. In 1989 he co-wrote and directed 7 puppeteers operating 80 puppets in The Snow Queen at the Bob Baker Marionette Theater in Los Angeles.

Earl toured the U.S. giving concerts for children and their families, combining his talents as a singer, songwriter and puppeteer. He worked one-on-one with children and adults, teaching them puppet making and performance through such organizations as the Los Angeles Department of Cultural Affairs, Mark Taper Forum/Music Center, California Youth Theatre, L.A.'s Best, Puppeteers of America, L.A. Inner City Arts, Beverly Hills Parks & Recreation, Kaiser Permanente, The Sycamores, L.A. Unified School District, Art Share L.A, Hollywood Arts Council and the Los Angeles Human Relations Commission. In 2002, Michael created the "Puppet Power!" program through California Youth Theatre, where he taught, designed, co-built, directed and produced the first (and 2nd) annual Ivar Puppet Festival, involving 150 L.A. Unified School District teens from two different high schools building dozens of giant 15-foot puppets they performed at the Ivar Theatre in Hollywood'.

In 2008, Earl made a brief appearance on the Sky One observational documentary series UK Border Force when he was filmed being refused entry into the UK at Heathrow Airport, as his employer had not obtained a work visa for him. He briefly gave a demonstration of some of his puppetry skills in a lighter moment whilst he waited for his deportation.

In 2010, he partnered with Roberto Ferreira to open Puppet School. In December of that year, they premiered a new original musical entitled, "It's a Monster World," where Earl performed live on-stage alongside his advanced students. Michael Earl continued to teach TV puppetry in Los Angeles and New York City (www.puppetschool.com), while writing and developing new entertainments that "encourage, instruct and strengthen children of all ages through the imaginative use of music and puppetry."

In May 2011, Puppet School premiered a sold-out run of another live stage show called "Puppet Jukebox" in Hollywood – featuring Earl and his advanced puppetry students. Also in 2011, Earl announced his plan to launch "TV Puppets Unplugged!" – a touring lecture/demonstration that features stories and film clips from his 30-year career. TV Puppets Unplugged! played at colleges throughout the US.

== Personal life and death ==
Earl lived in Los Angeles, California. On December 23, 2015, he died at the age of 56 from colon cancer, which he had for three years since 2012.

== Filmography ==
=== Live action ===
- Team America: World Police – Lead Terrorists
- Men in Black II – Puppet Alien
- The Adventures of Timmy the Tooth – Ms. Flossy, Mumfred the Mummy
- Geo Kids –
- Dinosaurs – Refrigerator Monster
- The Adventures of Timmy the Tooth – Ms. Flossy, Bunky, Thirstin the Cloud, Additional characters
- Ticktock Minutes – Dr. Ticktock
- Sesame Street: Sing Yourself Silly! – Additional Muppets
- Sesame Songs: Rock & Roll – Additional Muppets
- The Jim Henson Hour – (Pilot) Additional Muppets
- Muppet Wildlife PSAs – Muppet Penguin
- Little Muppet Monsters – Muppet Penguin
- Sesame Street 20th Anniversary Special – Additional Muppet Performer
- The Muppets Take Manhattan – Additional Muppet Performer
- Mr. Mom – Mr. Snuffleupagus (Archive footage on TV)
- Simon – Commune Member
- UK Border Force – Himself
- John Denver and the Muppets: A Christmas Together – Additional Muppet Performer
- Sesame Street – Mr. Snuffleupagus, Forgetful Jones, Slimey the Worm, Poco Loco, Honkers, Polly Darton, Leslie Mostley, Additional Muppets for three seasons (1978–1981)
- The Dark Crystal – Additional Muppet Performer (Puppet Test footage)
- The Muppet Movie – Additional Muppet Performer, operating Fozzie Bear, Dr. Teeth, Animal, Janice, Zoot, Scooter, Beaker and others when lead Muppeteer was performing another one of their characters in the same scene.
- Theodore Rex – The Reverend
- The Phantom Tollbooth – Milo's Friend (uncredited)
- Funnybones – Dr. Ticktock
- GeoScout – Dr. Ticktock
- Media Mania – Mortimer Monster
- Life on Earth – Alien, MTV Music Video
- Fandango – Various paper bag puppets in movie theatre spots
- Rock Along with Bo Peep – Fleeter Mouse

=== Non-anime ===
- Where on Earth Is Carmen Sandiego? – Ira Gation, Additional Voices

=== Visual effects ===
- Shrek – Motion capture Shrek body suit

Preceded by Jerry Nelson	Performer of Mr. Snuffleupagus; 1978–1981	Succeeded by Martin P. Robinson
Preceded by None	Performer of Polly Darton; 1978–1981	Succeeded by Fran Brill
Preceded by None	Performer of Forgetful Jones; 1979–1981	Succeeded by Richard Hunt
