= The Mr. Potato Head Show =

- Title logo featuring Mr. Potato Head, Baloney, Queenie Sweet Potato, and Potato Bug
- Genre: Comedy; Puppetry
- Created by: Dan Clark; Doug Langdale
- Based on: Mr. Potato Head by George Lerner
- Starring: Brian Jacobs; Lisa Kaplan; Doug Langdale; Puppeteers: Greg Ballora; Julianne Buescher; Kevin Carlson; Brian Jacobs; James Murray; Debra Wilson; Mark Bryan Wilson
- Theme music composer: Mark Mothersbaugh
- Opening theme: "The Mr. Potato Head Show Theme"
- Ending theme: "The Mr. Potato Head Show Theme" (instrumental)
- Composers: Mark Mothersbaugh; Ernie Mannix
- Country of origin: United States
- Original language: English
- No. of seasons: 1
- No. of episodes: 13

Production
- Executive producer: Andy Copley
- Running time: 22 minutes
- Production company: Film Roman

Original release
- Network: Fox (Fox Kids)
- Release: September 12, 1998 – February 16, 1999

Related
- Potato Head Kids

The Mr. Potato Head Show is an American children's television series loosely based on the toyline of the same name by toy company Hasbro. It aired on Fox as part of its Fox Kids programming block from September 12, 1998, to February 16, 1999.

== Premise ==
Throughout the series, Mr. Potato Head always puts on a TV episode with the help of his Kitchen Crew and presents each episode to the TV Guys so that they can air them on television. During production on each episode, Mr. Potato Head and his Kitchen Crew have various misadventures.

== Characters ==
=== Kitchen Crew ===
- Mr. Potato Head (performed by Kevin Carlson) is the main protagonist of the series. He is an anthropomorphic potato who serves as the leader of the Kitchen Crew where they make different shows in his studio for the TV Guys. He is often referred to as "P.H." by his friends and colleagues throughout the show.
- Baloney (performed by Greg Ballora) is an anthropomorphic stack of bologna sausage slices who is Mr. Potato Head's best friend. He often serves as the voice of reason for the Kitchen Crew on some occasions and is also Mr. Potato Head's personal assistant.
- Queenie Sweet Potato (performed by Debra Wilson) is an anthropomorphic sweet potato who serves as the Kitchen Crew's diva. She is gifted with an amazing voice and is viewed by most of the crew, especially by Mr. Potato Head, as the most talented performer in the bunch. Queenie's love for sugar cream pies and her crush on Leonardo DiCaprio are both brought up numerous times throughout the series.
- Potato Bug (performed by Julianne Buescher) is a female potato bug and she is largely considered to be the oddball of the Kitchen Crew, stemming from her wacky personality and various quirks (such as believing that goblins deliver the newspaper every morning, thinking that the term "scapegoat" refers to an actual animal, talking to shoes like they are people, and having a fascination for the undersides of tables). While being portrayed as somewhat oblivious, Potato Bug is energetic, kind, fiercely loyal to her friends, and unabashedly herself.
- Canny (performed by James Murray) is a dog made out of dog food cans and Mr. Potato Head's pet. In "Not With a Bang" Part 1, it is revealed that Canny used to work as a University Physics Professor.
- Johnny Rotten Apple (performed by James Murray) is an anthropomorphic rotten apple who serves as the Kitchen Crew's residential musician with a rock star personality. In most of his appearances, he would sing about a random character or other things, like cheese or cultural diversity. Johnny Rotten Apple's name is a spoof of the stage name of John Lydon. In the episode "Aliens Dig Baloney", it is revealed that he is allergic to yogurt.
- Dr. Fruitcake (performed by James Murray in a Transylvanian accent) is an anthropomorphic fruitcake who serves as the Kitchen Crew's residential mad scientist. He is the creator of Ham Monster and often comes up with different inventions to help Mr. Potato Head in his episodes.
  - Ham Monster (performed by Mark Bryan Wilson) is a composite monster made out of ham (hence the name) with bolts on the neck and stitches on parts of its body, crab claws for arms, and chicken drumsticks on it who was created by Dr. Fruitcake. When he first appeared in the episode "Aliens Dig Baloney", Dr. Fruitcake created Ham Monster for Mr. Potato Head's monster episode only to go berserk across the studio. Using the secret of making ham explode that he learned from the aliens, Baloney did a chant that made Ham Monster explode. In the episode "Royal Pain", Ham Monster was rebuilt with the brain of a 2-year-old child, making him more obedient to Dr. Fruitcake. When Baloney started to ask where Dr. Fruitcake got the brain of a 2-year-old child, Dr. Fruitcake cuts his question off by stating "Trust me, Baloney, you don't want to know".
- Mr. Giblets (performed by James Murray) is an anthropomorphic pile of giblets with a disturbing admiration for anything macabre or creepy which makes other members of the Kitchen Crew uncomfortable. In "Forsake Me Not", Mr. Giblets owns a "Screams of Pain" CD that he enjoys listening over and over again. In "Not With A Bang" Part 1, he tries to run for a position in government by making as he says "hollow campaign promises" that the crowd actually believes.
- Mr. Happy Whip (performed by Brian Jacobs) is an anthropomorphic whipped cream spray who emits whipped cream when scared or nervous.
- Miss Licorice Lips (voiced by Debra Wilson) are a talking pair of animated lips made of black licorice that serves as the announcer and narrator for Mr. Potato Head's episodes.

=== Supporting characters ===
- The TV Guys (portrayed by Brian Jacobs and Lisa Kaplan): Aron and Nora are television executives working at a television company that airs Mr. Potato Head's show. They would critique Mr. Potato Head's recent show submissions and commission new episodes. Between the two of them, Nora is the more vocal executive while Aron is more of the quiet, right-hand man to Nora. A catchphrase used by the executives (more commonly by Nora) whenever Mr. Potato Head tries to explain a situation to them or whenever he says something simple and straightforward, they will laugh and say "I don't know what that means, but I love it!" At one point in "Equal Writes", Nora admitted that she does not have a thesaurus.
- The Writer (portrayed by Doug Langdale) is an unnamed human who serves as the screenwriter for episodes of Mr. Potato Head's show. He does his job inside his closet and is always seen with a bagel in his mouth. As seen in "Equal Writes", he speaks by typing on his typewriter while he has a bagel in his mouth.
- Betty the Kitchen Fairy (voiced by Julianne Buescher) is an animated fairy who uses a ladle as her wand. She usually pops in to give the Kitchen Crew advice on how to get through their plights even when they are in an unrelated dangerous situation. In the episode "The Thing in the Microwave", it is shown that she has the ability to freeze time.

=== Other characters ===
- The Aliens (performed by Kevin Carlson and James Murray) are an unidentified race of grey aliens. In "Aliens Dig Baloney", the aliens arrive on Earth to find a new leader for their galactic empire to which they end up meeting and teaching Baloney the secret on how to make ham explode. In "Smart Attack", the aliens obtain the ghost of Mr. Potato Head's plant as their new leader. In "Not With a Bang" Part 1, a representative of the aliens poses as the TV Guys' smirking boss (also portrayed by James Murray) in order to get Mr. Potato Head's show cancelled and place Donkey Waddlefoot's show in its spot. This was part of a plan by Emperor Ghost Plant to invade Earth. In "Not With a Bang" Part 2, the aliens begin their invasion of Earth where they engage the Kitchen Crew. With help from Betty the Kitchen Fairy, the aliens were repelled upon being chased off by Blostrogath the Destroyer. Mr. Potato Head then confronts the alien representative at the TV Guys' station who sheds his disguise, admits defeat by stating that invading Earth was not a good idea, and then takes his leave from Earth.
- Blostrogath the Destroyer (voiced by James Murray) is an animated ancient evil monster who was imprisoned in a bag of 65,000,000-year-old popcorn. In the episode "The Thing in the Microwave", Queenie Sweet Potato accidentally freed him when his bag was put in the microwave where he begins his plan to destroy Earth and everything. After being told to be herself by Betty the Kitchen Fairy, Queenie evades Blostrogath's attacks as Mr. Potato Head (as Spudman) summons the Junior Spud Squad to help defeat Blostrogath upon being tricked into the microwave. In "Not With a Bang" Part 2, Betty the Kitchen Fairy summoned Blostrogath to chase away the invading alien armada.
- Donkey Waddlefoot (voiced by Kevin Carlson) is an unseen character who is Mr. Potato Head's rival in television entertainment.

== Episodes ==
No.	Title	Original release date
1	"Aliens Dig Baloney"	October 3, 1998
Baloney attempts to deliver a VHS tape containing Mr. Potato Head's cop episode to the TV Guys when suddenly a pair of aliens arrive on Earth, seeking a new ruler for their interstellar empire. Meanwhile, Dr. Fruitcake creates the Ham Monster for Mr. Potato Head's monster episode which proves to be too dangerous for him to control.
2	"Royal Pain"	October 10, 1998
Queenie finds out that she is descended from an Egyptian Pharaoh named King Yaminhotep upon going onto an ancestral website called "Ancestors "R" Us". Meanwhile, as Mr. Potato Head tries to make a show for two-year-olds, he uses a rebuilt Ham Monster as his test audience since Dr. Fruitcake made him less dangerous by giving him the brain of a 2-year-old child.
3	"The Thing in the Microwave"	September 12, 1998
Queenie goes on a diet, but her cravings result in her unleashing an ancient evil called Blostrograth the Destroyer from a bag of popcorn. Meanwhile, Mr. Potato Head makes a superhero show where he plays Spudman.
4	"Secret Agent Mania"	September 19, 1998
Upon finding out that Donkey Waddlefoot's show stole his submarine show, Mr. Potato Head informs the TV Guys about it as he is told to do a spy show. Mr. Potato Head does this as well as trying to find out how Donkey Waddlefoot found the footage to make his own episodes.
5	"Cheap Shots"	September 26, 1998
When the TV Guys give Mr. Potato Head a cookie jar full of money for his efforts after asking him to do a science-fiction show, he goes money-crazy which starts to affect the Kitchen Crew in various ways like nuclear waste that enlarges Dr. Fruitcake. Meanwhile, Baloney works on his plans for a magic show where he accidentally turns Johnny Rotten Apple into a toaster, to Queenie's disapproval. When Queenie, Baloney, Potato Bug, and Johnny Rotten Apple quit working for Mr. Potato Head and put on a magic show, Baloney accidentally conjures a monster during a hat trick.
6	"Potato Verite"	November 7, 1998
Mr. Potato Head walks in on Queenie supposedly making a deal with his nemesis Donkey Waddlefoot. Thinking that she is going to leave, he puts on a variety show to appease her so she can do a lot of singing. Meanwhile, Queenie thinks Mr. Potato Head wants to marry her following the incident.
7	"Forsake Me Not"	December 19, 1998
Displeased with Mr. Potato Head's panel discussion show, the TV Guys have Mr. Potato Head do a reality show where he follows everyone around with a camera. When his show turns out to be as boring as two dead frogs in a bucket, he pits his friends against each other to liven it up.
8	"Equal Writes"	December 5, 1998
Following Mr. Potato Head's western show, the TV Guys have Mr. Potato Head fire the writer due to the gun violence, causing Mr. Potato Head to order the writer to cut out the violence. Once that was done and a re-shoot is done, the TV Guys are not impressed with the lack of a non-violent shootout, resulting in them sending Bullyboy McFearson to supervise his show where he makes Mr. Potato Head fire the writer, making the Kitchen Crew write scripts to impress him, and threatening to cancel the show if Bullyboy is not happy as stated in the contract.
9	"Robotato"	February 9, 1999
When Mr. Potato Head goes on vacation after filming "Chowder Rangers", and he has Dr. Fruitcake create a robotic duplicate of him to take over the show while he is gone. When Mr. Potato Head returns, he finds that his robotic duplicate is loved by the Kitchen Crew more than himself to which he becomes depressed about it.
10	"Pillow"	February 16, 1999
The TV Guys are displeased with Queenie's musical performance that insults television. When Queenie gets depressed, she uses Baloney's "happy pillow" to make her feel better. Soon, everyone also wants the pillow so that they can be happy. Meanwhile, a flower lady supposedly casts a "curse" on Mr. Potato Head where the antics causes delays to Mr. Potato Head's gladiator episode.
11	"Smart Attack"	October 31, 1998
When Potato Bug accidentally kills Mr. Potato Head's prized plant while he is away at the National Association of Talking Potatoes Convention, she seeks help from Dr. Fruitcake to make her smarter where her improvements to the kitchen affects the Kitchen Crew when they work on a Sherlock Holmes episode. The Aliens think her advanced intelligence is really for the better.
12	"Not With a Bang (Part 1)"	November 14, 1998
After the TV Guys watch Mr. Potato Head's karate show, the TV Guys' boss orders the cancellation of Mr. Potato Head's show and putting Donkey Waddlefoot's show in his time slot, causing Mr. Potato Head and his Kitchen Crew to go their separate ways. Mr. Potato Head and Baloney go on a road trip while forgetting to release the writer from his closet. Queenie and Potato Bug perform on a glass-bottom cruise ship that shatters and sinks when Queenie sings high, leaving them lost at sea. Dr. Fruitcake and Ham Monster visit alternate realities where "The Mr. Potato Head Show" was not cancelled, with their latest visit causing them to be chased by a Giant Carnivorous Mr. Potato Head. Johnny Rotten Apple and Mr. Happy Whip work at a restaurant, and Mr. Giblets runs for a position in the government. Meanwhile, the aliens and Emperor Ghost Plant begin their alien invasion plans.
13	"Not With a Bang (Part 2)"	November 21, 1998
The Kitchen Crew members manage to get out of their respective situations and reunite to revive their show through whatever way possible. The alien invasion is in full swing as an episode of Donkey Waddlefoot states that the aliens are not doing anything bad. Using clones of the car that Mr. Potato Head and Baloney used for their road trip, the Kitchen Crew flies into outer space to combat the aliens. For once, they receive actual help from Betty the Kitchen Fairy who summons Blostrogath the Destroyer to attack the aliens. Afterwards, Mr. Potato Head confronts the TV Guys' boss who was the alien leader all along. Once the leader calls off the invasion and leaves, the TV Guys put Mr. Potato Head's show back on the air.

== Cast ==
- Brian Jacobs as Aron
- Lisa Kaplan as Nora
- Doug Langdale as The Writer
- Lee Arenberg as Bullyboy McFearson (ep. 8)
- Greg Ballora as Theater Patron (ep. 13)
- Julianne Buescher as Flower Lady (ep. 10)
- Kevin Carlson as News Anchor (ep. 2)
- James Murray as The Smirking Man (ep. 12–13), Waiter Voice (ep. 9), Time Passing Voice (ep. 9)

=== Puppeteers ===
- Kevin Carlson as Mr. Potato Head, Alien (ep. 1, 11–13), Donkey Waddlefoot (ep. 6, 13), Giant Carnivorous Mr. Potato Head (ep. 12–13)
- Greg Ballora as Baloney, Mama Potato Head (ep. 10)
- Julianne Buescher as Potato Bug, Betty the Kitchen Fairy
- Brian Jacobs as Mr. Happy Whip
- James Murray as Dr. Fruitcake, Johnny Rotten Apple, Mr. Giblets, Alien (ep. 1, 11–13), Blostrogath the Destroyer (ep. 3, 13), Robotato (ep. 9)
- Debra Wilson as Queenie Sweet Potato, Miss Licorice Lips, Chicken (ep. 12)
- Mark Bryan Wilson as Ham Monster

==== Assistant puppeteers ====
- Brad Abrell
- Donna Kimball
- Alison Mork
- William Traetta

== Production ==
The Mr. Potato Head Show was developed by Dan Clark and Doug Langdale. The puppet characters were created by The Chiodo Brothers. Mark Bryan Wilson served as the show's puppet master while William Traetta served as the show's assistant puppet master.
