= List of The Adventures of Puss in Boots episodes =

The Adventures of Puss in Boots is an American animated web television series. It stars the character Puss in Boots from the DreamWorks Animation Shrek franchise. The series debuted on January 16, 2015, on Netflix, when the first five episodes of the first season were released. The sixth and final season was released on January 26, 2018. During the course of the series, 78 episodes of The Adventures of Puss in Boots were released over six seasons.

== Series overview ==
Season	Episodes		Originally released
1	15	5	January 16, 2015
1	15	5	May 8, 2015
1	15	5	September 28, 2015
2	11		December 11, 2015
3	13		July 15, 2016
4	13		December 16, 2016
Special			June 20, 2017
5	13		July 28, 2017
6	12		January 26, 2018

== Episodes ==
=== Season 1 (2015) ===
No. overall	No. in season	Title	Directed by	Written by	Original release date
1	1	"Hidden"	Luther McLaurin & Lane Lueras	Doug Langdale	January 16, 2015
Puss in Boots is in a town when he encounters Dulcinea who is being harassed by thieves. After rescuing her, he helps her buy some silk, but gets concerned that she might be attacked on her way home, so he follows her to the desert and through a hidden portal accidentally to the legendary town of San Lorenzo. There he meets the town's residents who have been living in secrecy for many years. Dulcinea shows Puss their town's treasure room, but when Puss steals a coin from the vault (intended as a memento of his visit), he inadvertently breaks the spell that has cloaked the town, and must defend it from the oncoming thugs. Afterwards, he agrees to stay around to protect the town until they can restore the spell.
2	2	"Sphinx"	Lane Lueras	Doug Langdale	January 16, 2015
Puss accidentally gives the orphans a magic substance that will ultimately make them explode. The only cure is guarded by a Sphinx who challenges Puss with riddles – and contrary to his own belief, Puss is not good at riddles.
3	3	"Brothers"	Lane Lueras	Greg White	January 16, 2015
Puss is Toby's new best friend, and it's driving Puss crazy. When Toby is kidnapped by his ninja brothers, Puss realizes how much he misses the big oaf. Unfortunately, the brothers use Toby to steal a powerful gauntlet from the treasure house, which they plan to use for "mad evil, bro."
4	4	"Duchess"	David Mucci Fassett	Jesse Porter	January 16, 2015
The Duchess seeks Artephius' soul for her spell collection and it's up to Puss to protect him. It turns out that The Duchess and Artephius have a complicated relationship.
5	5	"Adventure"	Luther McLaurin	Ben Acker & Ben Blacker	January 16, 2015
Puss misses the old days adventuring with his buddy Jack Sprat. Fearful he will leave San Lorenzo, Dulcinea concocts a super special adventure surprise with the orphans. But Jack Sprat shows up with the promise of a damsel in distress....who turns out to be a super scary monster.
6	6	"Fountains"	Douglas Lovelace	Doug Langdale	May 8, 2015
When Puss's old master, White Glove (El Guante Blanco), comes to town Puss is shocked to hear that he is retiring. So in order to prevent this Puss, Artephius, and Dulcinea go in search of the fountain of youth which is guarded by Sphinx's vicious sister, Callista.
7	7	"Bravery"	David Mucci Fassett	Greg White	May 8, 2015
The mayor, Temoroso, constantly wakes Puss with his paranoid fears. In an attempt to make the mayor braver Puss and Dulcinea hire bandits to pretend that the mayor defeats them. Feeling brave the mayor becomes a wandering hero while Puss is made mayor. Only the mayor angers the bandits and they attack the town leading to a bizarre fight with a barrel.
8	8	"Golem"	Luther McLaurin	Jesse Porter	May 8, 2015
Long ago, Puss angered an evil wizard, who then created a golem to hunt Puss down. When the golem finally tracks Puss to San Lorenzo, Puss must discover a way to get the golem to stop chasing him and obey new orders. Things get out of hand, however, when the orphans start giving the golem their own commands.
9	9	"Boots"	Roy Burdine	Tad Stones	May 8, 2015
When Jack Sprat comes back to town, he tricks Puss into letting him into the treasure room so he can steal the 7 League boots which grant the wearer incredible speed. Only problem is the boots unleash a demon called the Devil Wind that Puss and Jack must defeat together.
10	10	"Sword"	David Mucci Fassett	Ben Acker & Ben Blacker	May 8, 2015
Dulcinea becomes enchanted with heroic powers when she pulls a magical sword from a stone, and Puss must help her learn how to control her strength.
11	11	"Mouse"	Roy Burdine	Candie Kelty Langdale	September 28, 2015
Fartholomew Fishflinger, an evil wizard Artephius turned into a mouse, comes to San Lorenzo to seek his revenge and to become a human again by stealing the souls of the people.
12	12	"Goblin"	Douglas Lovelace	Jesse Porter	September 28, 2015
A tomboyish Goblin comes to the San Lorenzo orphanage and befriends nearly all the orphans and Puss, but is soon revealed to be an ally of the Duchess.
13	13	"Star"	Roy Burdine	Julia Yorks	September 28, 2015
Dulcinea befriends a magical wishing star named Esteban (voiced by Jack McBrayer) and begins using wishes to assist her friends, only to receive unexpected results.
14	14	"Pigs"	Mucci Fassett	Greg White	September 28, 2015
When Brandt, one of Toby's ninja brothers, becomes convinced that the rest are under the spell of a wizard, he goes to Puss for assistance.
15	15	"Luck"	Mucci Fassett	Ben Acker & Ben Blacker	September 28, 2015
A Goblin bewitches Puss with bad luck (subsequently turning him into a black cat), subsequently causing him to be expelled from San Lorenzeo and he befriends 3 LARP-esque black cats who try to convince him to turn to a life of crime.

=== Season 2 (2015) ===
No. overall	No. in season	Title	Directed by	Written by	Original release date
16	1	"Dragon"	Douglas Lovelace	Greg White	December 11, 2015
Puss attempts to slay a dragon, but changes his mind when the beast reveals its gentle nature and follows him back to San Lorenzo.
17	2	"Moles"	Roy Burdine	Doug Langdale	December 11, 2015
Puss and Jack Sprat attempt to claim jewels underneath San Lorenzo while contending with humanoid moles and their king.
18	3	"Mermaid"	Ben Juwono	Greg White	December 11, 2015
To prove that he is a ladies man, Puss rescues a hideous mermaid that starts to follow him everywhere he goes, much to his dismay.
19	4	"Bees"	Roy Burdine	Candie Kelty Langdale	December 11, 2015
Puss must face his fear of bees to stop a greedy piper who brought the bees to the village.
20	5	"Squad"	Douglas Lovelace	Jesse Porter	December 11, 2015
Puss trains the orphan kids to be the towns next defense in his absence and they're put to the test when he's kidnapped by an old enemy.
21	6	"Spells"	Ben Juwono	Ben Acker & Ben Blacker	December 11, 2015
Puss's attempts to have San Lorenzo protection spell restored, causing him to accidentally bring Artiphius's owl macrame shop to life.
22	7	"Scimitar"	Douglas Lovelace	Jesse Porter	December 11, 2015
Puss reluctantly lets the evil sword Scimitar guide him to where he may find a magical rod, but the sword begins to corrupt Dulcinea. Along the way they befriend Uli, the faun with swedish accent.
23	8	"Stories"	Roy Burdine	Ben Acker & Ben Blacker	December 11, 2015
The orphans and Artiphius stall Taranus, a thunder god, from retrieving his thunder shard from the town treasure hall by telling him exaggerated stories of Puss's adventures.
24	9	"Sphere"	Douglas Lovelace	Jesse Porter	December 11, 2015
The Mole King's shiny orb is part of the San Lorenzo treasure house and Puss decides to trade it for another one if he can get the king and his ex-beau back together.
25	10	"Si"	Ben Juwono	Greg White	December 11, 2015
Puss must fight the Duchess to retrieve San Lorenzo's final treasure, a coin Puss took from the treasure house that caused the protection spell on San Lorenzo to be removed. However, it doesn't end well with the spell not working and Sino arriving and banishing Puss as a punishment for breaking the spell.
26	11	"No?"	Jim Hull	Doug Langdale	December 11, 2015
The wizard who made the protection spell on San Lorenzo banishes Puss for disabling the spell, but Dulcinea discovers that he is a fraud and tells Puss, who reluctantly returns. During the battle, the wizard reveals to be Fartholomew Fishflinger in disguise and mentioned that he secretly working with someone else. San Lorenzo is raised into the heights on top of a gigantic statue of the Bloodwolf, and it is revealed Uli was helping his return by planting the false scroll and using Fartholomew Fishflinger as a distraction.

=== Season 3 (2016) ===
No. overall	No. in season	Title	Directed by	Written by	Original release date
27	1	"Bootless Cries"	Johnny Castuciano	Greg White	July 15, 2016
Puss feels he failed everyone and decides to reinvent himself as a musician. Unfortunately, right then the Mole King and the Megamicre Queen invade the town with their armies, believing Puss to be responsible for their plight.
28	2	"Sullen Earth"	Johnny Castuciano	Greg White	July 15, 2016
Puss proves himself guilty in raising the Bloodwolf, but after Uli blurts out it was all his doing, the Mole King imprisons him instead. Unfortunately, it is revealed Uli knows about a prophecy to stop the Bloodwolf, so Puss tries to break him out of captivity.
29	3	"Ugly Duckling"	Jim Hull	Julia Yorks	July 15, 2016
Dulcinea convinces Puss to go to El Guante Blanco for help, but while he struggles with his inability to ask for help, he also becomes jealous of his mentor's new protégé, The Ugly Duckling, who is better at anything than Puss.
30	4	"The Muscle"	Ben Juwono	Jesse Porter	July 15, 2016
The gang sets out to find the Golem as the muscle for the team, only to find him being enslaved by the Duchess. Meanwhile, Puss tries to prove he is the strongest person on the team.
31	5	"Sword's Man"	Ben Juwono	Ben Acker & Ben Blacker	July 15, 2016
Puss and friends decide to recruit the Thriffith and the Good Sword, only to learn that the pair broken up. Puss feels he should be the Sword's new partner and tries to convince him, while an old enemy is tracking them to have his revenge on Puss.
32	6	"Escape Goat"	Johnny Castuciano	Candie Langdale	July 15, 2016
The now fully assembled Senior Puss Squad attempts to rescue Uli from the Mole Kingdom, but Puss trying to be the perfect leader by appeasing everyone complicates matters.
33	7	"Copy Cat"	Jim Hull	Jesse Porter	July 15, 2016
In an attempt to ride for two different groups in a horse race, Puss has Artephius create a "twin" of himself.
34	8	"Coin Toss"	Jim Hull	Jesse Porter	July 15, 2016
San Lorenzo becomes addicted to the game of coin toss started by Pajuna.
35	9	"King Pickles"	Johnny Castuciano	Ben Acker & Ben Blacker	July 15, 2016
Kid Pickles hates his birthday, so Puss hatches a plan to make him "King for a Day", but it soon turns into more than a game.
36	10	"Pirate Booty"	Jim Hull	Ben Acker & Ben Blacker	July 15, 2016
Puss joins a gang of pirates in his search for the Crown of Souls. Due to the Captain being depressed by the loss of his parrot, Puss slowly takes over as Captain, despite his inadequacy for the job.
37	11	"Cat Fish"	Ben Juwono	Greg White	July 15, 2016
To help cure Puss's fear of the ocean, the pirates push him overboard where he reunites with Feejee and her husband Brad, and helps give birth to their child.
38	12	"Parrot Booty"	Johnny Castuciano	Jesse Porter	July 15, 2016
Puss and the pirates find the buried treasure that contains the Crown of Souls, but stumble into a trap set by the Captain's former parrot. Meanwhile in San Lorenzo, The Senior Puss Squad accidentally scare the orphans, and try to make things right but only make it worse.
39	13	"Skeleton Town"	Ben Juwono	Ben Acker & Ben Blacker	July 15, 2016
In addition to bringing back the Crown of Souls, Puss introduces a group of creepy skeletons to San Lorenzo, setting everyone on edge.

=== Season 4 (2016) ===
No. overall	No. in season	Title	Directed by	Written by	Original release date
40	1	"Familiar Feeling"	Ben Juwono	Candie Kelty Langdale	December 16, 2016
With one gem missing from the Crown of Souls, Puss, Dulcinea, Artephius and the Duchess go out seeking the Eldritch witch sisters. They first have to deal with the first sister, Malviola, who would only hand over the gem in exchange for either Puss or Dulcinea becoming her familiar.
41	2	"In Dreams"	Johnny Castuciano	Ben Acker & Ben Blacker	December 16, 2016
Puss is put in a dream world by Malaranea Eldritch, who begins to absorb his lifeforce. It falls to Dulcinea to wake Puss up before he is lost forever.
42	3	"Fluteus Maximus"	Jim Hull	Jesse Porter	December 16, 2016
After outwitting the Piper aka Maliflua, the third Eldritch sister, Puss and friends discover the existence of a fourth sister is Duchess reavaled as Maldonna.
43	4	"Prey Time"	Ben Juwono	Julia Yorks	December 16, 2016
San Lorenzo goes into a sleepless panic after Puss goes missing. Meanwhile, Puss finds himself alone on a tropical island, but soon realizes someone or something is hunting him.
44	5	"Written By"	Roy Burdine	Jesse Porter	December 16, 2016
Dulcinea seeks out her favorite author, Miguel A. Andante, for information on the Crown of Souls. However it is revealed the book Dulcinea based her life on ruined her career and she hates it and made Dulcinea act insane. Meanwhile, Puss has a bounty on him.
45	6	"Breaking Good"	Johnny Castuciano	Greg White	December 16, 2016
Uli takes over Dulcinea's Class for Wayward Thieves, causing chaos in San Lorenzo.
46	7	"Fancy Beast"	Ben Juwono	Jesse Porter	December 16, 2016
Puss, Dulcinea, Miguela and Uli have to deal with an ogre playing an aristocrat to obtain a book on the Crown of Souls.
47	8	"Titan Up"	Roy Burdine	Julia Yorks	December 16, 2016
Taranis the Thunder God seeks out Puss' aid in stopping the King of the Gods from destroying all mortals.
48	9	"Boar Games"	Johnny Castuciano	Jesse Porter	December 16, 2016
An old friend of Pajuna's has come to collect the bounty on Puss, and Pajuna does everything in her power to keep the two apart.
49	10	"Small Change"	Ben Juwono	Julia Yorks	December 16, 2016
Puss and friends seek out the Sphinx's sister, Callista, for information on the Obelisk of Night.
50	11	"Little Lamb"	Roy Burdine	Jesse Porter	December 16, 2016
Puss and friends strike a deal with Angus the sheep to reunite him with his friend Mary in exchange for the Obelisk of Night.
51	12	"The Obelisk"	Johnny Castuciano	Greg White	December 16, 2016
Upon their return to San Lorenzo, Puss and friends discover that El Moco had taken over in their absence. After dealing with El Moco, they found the Obelisk of Night as it turns out that Dulcenia is chosen from the prophecy.
52	13	"The Bloodwolf"	Ben Juwono	Doug Langdale	December 16, 2016
With the Bloodwolf having returned, Dulcinea learns that she has to make a difficult choice to stop him.

=== Interactive special (2017) ===
No. overall	Title	Directed by	Written by	Original release date
53	"Puss in Book: Trapped in an Epic Tale"	Roy Burdine & Johnny Castuciano	Doug Langdale & Greg White	June 20, 2017
Puss finds a fairy-tale book while on a mission fighting ninjas. Upon opening it, he becomes trapped in the book, and to free him, the viewer must decide on the outcomes of every decision that Puss faces.

=== Season 5 (2017) ===
No. overall	No. in season	Title	Directed by	Written by	Original release date
54	1	"Second to One"	Dan Forgione	Greg White	July 28, 2017
With The Bloodwolf defeated, the Señor Puss Squad disbands. Due to Dulcinea being The One from the prophecy, Puss promotes her to hero of the town and after an existential crisis resolves to be her sidekick. This of course just leads to more trouble.
55	2	"Not a Drill"	Roy Burdine	Julia Yorks	July 28, 2017
As Artephius lazily works on a spell to seal the Netherworld portal, Puss drills the townspeople so they may protect themselves from monsters who cross over, asking the orphans to create a fake monster for the drill. The townsfolk don't take the drill too seriously, which leads to problems when the papiermache monster turns out to be a real creature...
56	3	"Caballo Sin Cabeza"	Johnny Castuciano	Jesse Porter	July 28, 2017
As Eames finds himself ignored by everyone in town, he is suddenly noticed due to another creature emerging from the Netherworld portal -a headless horse: Caballo Sin Cabeza. The horse is trying to find a perfect head and magically steals people's heads, including Eames' - but the clock is ticking for Puss to save Eames, since if the head is not returned to its original body in time, the body will disappear!
57	4	"My Fair Demon"	Dan Forgione	Julia Yorks	July 28, 2017
Dulcinea's encouragement of good deeds goes awry when Puss and the other villagers set out to teach Pigmalion, a good-natured Netherworld demon, how to be evil.
58	5	"Too Many Cats"	Roy Burdine	Jesse Porter	July 28, 2017
Dozens of alternate dimension versions of Puss emerge from the Netherworld and Puss couldn't be happier. As the multiple Pusses enjoy themselves, they fail to notice the darker, more ambitious version of Puss who also emerged.
59	6	"Before They Hatch"	Johnny Castuciano	Candie Kelty Langdale	July 28, 2017
Esme's gargoyle friend Sally returns to San Lorenzo after a year's banishment by Senora Zapata in the Netherworld. Sally's jewel-like eggs have gone missing and Puss, Dulcinea, Sally and Esme must find them before they hatch and cause mayhem. All the while, Señora Zapata is trying to convince Esme that Sally is a figment of her imagination.
60	7	"The Iceman Melteth"	Roy Burdine	Jesse Porter	July 28, 2017
Tim, a vengeful ice monster with a grudge against Puss arrives from the Netherworld. However, the hot desert climate causes him to melt, making him realize he wasted his life pursuing vengeance. Puss and Artephius come up with various plans to keep Tim cool, while Dulcinea help him fulfill all the tasks he has on his "bucket list".
61	8	"Swine and Roses"	Dan Forgione	Julia Yorks	July 28, 2017
It's Lord Chrispintine's day. On this day people gives roses to their "date" in San Lorenzo. Puss struggles to ask Dulcinea to be his date, while she struggles to ask him to be her date. In the meantime, a gang of faerie imps emerge from the Netherworld to cause trouble in the town, and attempt to trick Toby to join them. It is revealed a mysterious enemy called the Blind King is sending all these creatures, trying to destroy San Lorenzo.
62	9	"The Great Stink"	Dan Forgione	Michael Rhea	July 28, 2017
As a stinky smell engulfs San Lorenzo, sickening the citizens of San Lorenzo, it's up to Puss and the skeletons (who are unaffected, having no noses) to save the town. Puss soon discovers that a monster that emerged from the Netherworld is causing the smell.
63	10	"Dances with Dingoes"	Roy Burdine	Jesse Porter	July 28, 2017
A dingo named Sheila emerges from the Netherworld, claiming to simply have lost the way to a dance competition. Puss, who is antagonistic towards Sheila due her being a canine, as well as for her unorthodox dancing style, challenges her to a "dance-off". The stakes are raised though when Artephius discovers that Sheila's dance is a magical ritual that compels the townsfolk to join it, and will summon an evil creature called K'fhoggnarh. But it is revealed that Sheila was controlled by the Blind King by placing an anklet on her ankle.
64	11	"Remember Me Not"	Johnny Castuciano	Julia Yorks	July 28, 2017
Dulcinea accidentally reveals that Lil' Pequena, a little orphan girl who has been present in the background through the whole season, is a sheevra (a shape-changing fairy) and was sent by the Blind King to gather information about San Lorenzo. She is capable of this by altering the memories of everyone, making them remember her always having lived in the orphanage - and now she uses the same ability to make everyone forget about Dulcinea, who has to make her friends remember who she is.
65	12	"Through Caverns Measureless"	Johnny Castuciano	Greg White	July 28, 2017
The town puts together a team to enter the Netherworld portal and confront the Blind King. On the other side, everyone except Puss gains superpowers: Dulcinea has super strength, Toby can fly, Artephius becomes capable of telekinesis, and Babieca becomes capable of speech and a stunning scream. They meet and team up with Hecate, a sorceress who was the helper of the Netherworld's previous ruler, but Puss starts to feel unnecessary as his friends are now more capable than he is.
66	13	"A Savage Place"	Dan Forgione	Doug Langdale	July 28, 2017
The Blind King is revealed to be the evil Puss from an alternate universe from an earlier episode, who lost his sight but gained mind control powers when he was tossed into the portal. The team is defeated despite their powers, and Puss realizes he is the heart of the team and rallies them to save the day. After freeing Lil'Pequena - who was the original ruler of the Netherworld - and deposing the Blind King, they return to San Lorenzo, only to find gravestones next to the portal with their own names on it.

=== Season 6 (2018) ===
No. overall	No. in season	Title	Directed by	Written by	Original release date
67	1	"Save the Town"	Roy Burdine	Jesse Porter	January 26, 2018
Puss, Dulcinea, Artephius, Toby and Babieca have returned from the Netherworld but a whole year has passed in the normal world and the five are presumed dead. San Lorenzo has become overrun by thieves led by El Moco who plans to destroy the town. Puss must gather the San Lorenzan diaspora before their beloved home is made into ruins.
68	2	"Save the Cat"	Johnny Castuciano	Julia Yorks	January 26, 2018
In order to gather the San Lorenzans who had fled, Puss and the others must make numerous exchanges. Successful, Puss heads into battle against El Moco.
69	3	"Lost and Foundlings"	Dan Forgione	Jesse Porter	January 26, 2018
The Duchess returns to San Lorenzo to adopt one of the orphans as to start a family of her own. The children, not wanting to leave, try their hardest not to impress The Duchess and Artephius attempts to placate her anger toward him. San Lorenzo also begins to suffer from earthquakes.
70	4	"The Scarlet Panther"	Johnny Castuciano	Julia Yorks	January 26, 2018
An infamous loan shark called Scarlet Panther claims that Puss' boots used to belong to him. Puss surrenders his boots but loses his identity along with them.
71	5	"Pajuna Serves Spirits"	Bob Suarez	Michael Rhea	January 26, 2018
To provide entertainment on a quiet night, Pajuna demonstrates her abilities as a spirit medium. However she accidentally summons vengeful ghosts who can take control of living things by using them as a vessel. The only way to release the spirit from the person is to give that person their heart's desire.
72	6	"One Last Jobs"	Johnny Castuciano	Jesse Porter	January 26, 2018
Pajuna's old friend Roz invites her on a series of "final" jobs as Puss runs the Cow and Moone quickly realizing that it's nowhere near as easy a job as he initially thought.
73	7	"Like a Fox"	Bob Suarez	Julia Yorks	January 26, 2018
Dulcinea's hero Guy Fox comes to San Lorenzo and offers to take her on his next adventure. Fully realizing his romantic feelings for Dulcinea, Puss becomes awash with jealousy but tries to hide it. But is Guy what he seems?
74	8	"Not a Date"	Bob Suarez	Jesse Porter & Julia Yorks	January 26, 2018
Puss and Dulcinea decide on a lakeside picnic but the machinations of their friends forces them both to declare it's a strictly platonic outing even though they'd both want otherwise.
75	9	"Flock the Boat"	Dan Forgione	Eduardo Penna	January 26, 2018
The earthquakes worsen and become more widespread as Puss goes on an adventure with the Sky Pirates to rescue their captain.
76	10	"All Hail, Puss!"	Dan Forgione	Greg White	January 26, 2018
Puss turns to the Sky gods to stop the earthquakes and they grant him divine power. Can Puss put an end to the quakes for good?
77	11	"The Moving Finger Writes"	Johnny Castuciano	Doug Langdale	January 26, 2018
With the world falling apart, Puss and Dulcinea must locate the Great Mage Sino. Along their way, it is revealed that Cleevil is the second tulpa and leads them to the Forbidden Citadel. Upon reaching the citadel's centre they find a withered and chained Artephius doppelgänger, the dark side of Sino's personality whereas Artephius himself is revealed to be Sino's good side as they fuse together to form his true self.
78	12	"And, Having Writ, Moves On"	Dan Forgione	Doug Langdale	January 26, 2018
The Great Mage Sino tells the full history of San Lorenzo and what Puss must do in order to save it. But saving the town (and the world) will require Puss to give up everything he's done for San Lorenzo.
