= Kevin Carlson =

American puppeteer

- Carlson in 2026
- Born: Kevin D. Carlson; April 12, 1962 (age 64); Orange, California, U.S.
- Occupation: Puppeteer
- Years active: 1987–present

Kevin D. Carlson (born April 12, 1962) is an American puppeteer, best known for his role of Mr. Potato Head in The Mr. Potato Head Show, Timmy the Tooth in The Adventures of Timmy the Tooth, and Warehouse Mouse in Imagination Movers.

== Early life ==
Carlson was born in Orange, California.

== Career ==
Carlson created The Adventures of Timmy the Tooth (alongside Dina Fraboni and James Murray), on which he also performed the titular character. Carlson also played Clockey, Floorey and Conky on Pee-wee's Playhouse.

From 1998 to 1999, Carlson performed as Mr. Potato Head in the Fox Kids series The Mr. Potato Head Show. From 2008 to 2013, he portrayed Warehouse Mouse in the Disney Channel preschool series Imagination Movers and reprised the role in the spin-off short series Where Is Warehouse Mouse?

== Filmography ==
=== Film ===
- Child's Play 2 - Chucky (assistant puppeteer)
- Elmopalooza - Additional Muppet Performer
- Muppet Classic Theater - Additional Muppet Performer
- Muppets Most Wanted - LA Muppet Performer
- The Muppets - Additional Muppet Performer
- Theodore Rex - Ankylosaurus Dad (puppeteer)
- The Happytime Murders - Additional Puppeteer

=== Television ===
- All That - Fuzz ("Have a Nice Day with Leroy and Fuzz" segments)
- Dinosaurs - Additional Dinosaur Performer
- Greg the Bunny
- Imagination Movers - Warehouse Mouse
- Late Night Buffet with Augie and Del - Joey the Monkey
- Lost on Earth - Ahab
- Muppets Tonight - Additional Muppet Performer
- Pee-wee's Playhouse - Clocky, Conkey, Floory, Knucklehead, Red Dinosaur (of the Dinosaur Family)
- The Adventures of Timmy the Tooth - Timmy the Tooth
- The Puzzle Place - Additional Performer
- The Office - Edward R. Meow (in "Take Your Daughter to Work Day")
- Where Is Warehouse Mouse? - Warehouse Mouse
- The Mr. Potato Head Show - Mr. Potato Head / Alien (in "Aliens Dig Baloney")
- The Muppets (ABC series, 2015–2016) - Additional Muppet Performer (in episodes 111 and 116)
- American Dad - (voice) (1 episode)
- Riders in the Sky
- The Muppet Show - Supporting Muppet Performer

=== Other ===
- 9.1.1 for Kids: The Great 911 Adventure - Bud
- Puppet Up! - Performer
- The Muppets Take the Bowl - Additional Muppet Performer (live show at the Hollywood Bowl, Sept. 8–10, 2017)
- The Muppets Take the O2 - Additional Muppet Performer (live show at the O2 Arena, Jul. 13–14, 2018

== Crew work ==
- Beetlejuice - Puppeteer
- Cats & Dogs - Puppeteer
- Dr. Dolittle - Puppeteer
- Dr. Dolittle 2 - Puppeteer
- Forgetting Sarah Marshall - Puppeteer
- Men in Black II - Puppeteer (uncredited)
- Team America: World Police - Principal Puppeteer
- The Adventures of Timmy the Tooth - Creator, Co-Producer, Writer
