= Dave the Barbarian =

Animated television series

- Promotional poster
- Genre: Surreal comedy
- Created by: Doug Langdale
- Directed by: Howy Parkins
- Voices of: Danny Cooksey; Erica Luttrell; Tress MacNeille; Kevin Michael Richardson; Frank Welker; Estelle Harris
- Narrated by: Jeff Bennett
- Composer: Shawn Patterson
- Country of origin: United States
- Original language: English
- No. of seasons: 1
- No. of episodes: 21 (42 segments)

Production
- Executive producer: Doug Langdale
- Running time: 22 minutes
- Production company: Walt Disney Television Animation

Original release
- Network: Disney Channel
- Release: January 23, 2004 – January 22, 2005

Dave the Barbarian is an American animated television series created by Doug Langdale for Disney Channel. It follows a barbarian, and his friends and family, on surreal comedy medieval-themed adventures. The series premiered on January 23, 2004, and ended on January 22, 2005, with a total of one season with 21 episodes.

== Premise ==
The series is set in the kingdom of Udrogoth during the Middle Ages. It centers on Dave (voiced by Danny Cooksey), a powerful, yet cowardly, barbarian who lives with his fashionable and self-centered older sister Candy (voiced by Erica Luttrell) and feisty younger sister Fang (voiced by Tress MacNeille). His parents, Throktar and Glimia, are the king and queen of Udrogoth but are away "fighting evil" across the world (though they sometimes communicate via a magic crystal ball or cauldron) and have left Candy in charge of the kingdom as princess regent, while Dave is supposed to defend the kingdom (since he is the biggest). Together the three siblings, along with their gluttonous and mildly incompetent "wizard" uncle Oswidge (voiced by Kevin Michael Richardson), are left to run and protect the kingdom from the comical, yet villainous and devious, Dark Lord Chuckles the Silly Piggy (voiced by Paul Rugg), as well as from other enemies and dangers.

There is a narrator, referred to either as "the Narrator" or "the Storyteller", voiced by Jeff Bennett. He is able to talk to the characters of the show, and vice versa, which breaks the fourth wall to the extent where he was once captured by Chuckles the Silly Piggy and was forced to tell the story according to his kidnapper's commands.

Dave the Barbarian stood out for its intense use of parody and meta-humor, specifically between the narrator and the characters. The show often included anachronisms, self-referential commentary, and over-the-top fantasy tropes, akin to Animaniacs and Freakazoid!. In one episode, the narrator pauses the story to bemoan his working conditions, while characters acknowledge that they are fictional.

== Characters ==
=== Main ===
- Dave (voiced by Danny Cooksey) is a muscular and very strong barbarian war-prince who is very sensitive to pain and would rather knit and cook than fight evil. He is also afraid of many things; when frightened, he tends to let out a high-pitched, effeminate scream.
- Candy (voiced by Erica Luttrell) has a contemporary "valley girl" attitude and would rather shop and hang out than rule a kingdom. Candy's main ability is her martial arts skills. She has displayed the most strength out of the family, often when it comes to monsters destroying a shop.
- Fang (voiced by Tress MacNeille) is a rambunctious and uncivilized young warrior who loves to smash things. She has long red hair in a ponytail. She is the subject of a running joke in which she is often mistaken for a monkey. However, she frequently acts and appears to look like a monkey, and during one episode she finds a tribe of monkeys who resemble her. Fang wields a spear in combat, as well as kicking, biting, and punching.
- Uncle Oswidge (voiced by Kevin Michael Richardson) is Dave, Fang, and Candy's uncle. He is a clumsy sorcerer who often wreaks havoc with his spells rather than being useful. He is an avid foodie, being a skilled chef and hash slinger; his favorite foods are ham and "Nut Logs", which he attacks a server to receive. Despite his inadequacy as a sorcerer, his knowledge of magic surpasses that of the rest of the family.
- Faffy (voiced by Frank Welker) is the family's pet dragon. Unlike most dragons, he breathes lightning and is domesticated. He has a wild streak that can be revealed when around other dragons, particularly evil ones with rebellious attitudes. The narrator has mentioned that Faffy has a one-digit IQ.
- Lula (voiced by Estelle Harris) is Dave's shrill, impatient, sarcastic, and enchanted sword. Her main ability is shooting lightning from the tip of her blade. She was once the sword of Argon the Ageless, with whom she was infatuated, but she was used by Argon as the nose of a snowman and left in the melted puddle for centuries. It is revealed that Lula is related to other mystical weapons of different kinds, her older sister being Mjolnir, the hammer of Thor, and her cousin being the trident of Poseidon.

=== Supporting ===
- King Throktar (voiced by Kevin Michael Richardson) and Queen Glimia (voiced by Erica Luttrell) are the proper rulers of Udrogoth and the parents of Dave, Candy and Fang. They are away fighting evil around the world, though they can communicate to their children via Oswidge's crystal ball, a magical cauldron, or other forms of fantasy telecommunication.
- The Narrator or Storyteller (voiced by Jeff Bennett) is the narrator of the series. He has never been seen in an episode.
- Dinky (voiced by Erica Luttrell) and Cheezette (voiced by Tress MacNeille) are Princess Candy's best friends, who are sometimes unsupportive – and wisely so – towards her actions. They are as obsessive about fashion, clothes, and social lives as Candy is.
- Mrs. Gert Bogmelon (voiced by Lisa Kaplan) is a witch-like shopkeeper who loves money and loves to rip off her customers. She can be cowed by Fang and other aggressive people but takes advantage of meek people like Dave. She sells evil weasels, mystical swords, and other plot-related paraphernalia, such as used T-shirts for sporting events.
- Twinkle the Marvel Horse (voiced by Jeff Bennett) is a magical pony with a rainbow-colored tail. He has extreme depression and possible psychosis, apparently due to being left on his own in the stable all the time. He often talks about his dreams, which are very disturbing. He is capable of flight, though he has no wings. His manner of speech is a parody of Christopher Walken.

=== Villains ===
- The Dark Lord Chuckles the Silly Piggy (voiced by Paul Rugg) is a pig with a high-collared cape bent on ruling Udrogoth and the main antagonist of the show. Chuckles lives in a castle on the outskirts of the kingdom. He possesses the Mystic Amulet of Hogswineboar (named so because hogs, swine, and boars are all synonyms for the word 'pig'), which grants him vast mystical powers such as telekinesis, shapeshifting, and conjuration. Chuckles has a nephew named Knuckles the Silly Piggy, who wants to be the Harvest Hog instead of a dark lord of evil.
- Malsquando (voiced by Rob Paulsen) is an evil sorcerer and Oswidge's rival. He has an obsession with taking over the world and making money. He was revealed to be a member of the Evil Sorcerers' union. He also runs a shop that cures hiccats (magical hiccups that produce cats from one's mouth). Malsquando reveals that while he attended sorcery school, Oswidge merely worked in a cafeteria, thus invalidating Oswidge as a wizard. Lula expresses that she finds his accent attractive.
- Quosmir (voiced by Michael McShane) is the god of freshly laundered trousers and overused punctuation. He resembles a Nāga, with a snake-like lower body. He has a severe inferiority complex that is only exacerbated in the presence of his mother. Quosmir has immense magical powers, including flight, super-speed, and flaming loogies.
- Princess Irmaplotz (voiced by Melissa Rivers) is the princess of Hyrogoth. Dave and Irmaplotz fell in love over their similar reading habits, love of bad poetry, and similar allergies. However, after careful consideration, Dave ended the relationship due to Irmaplotz's desire for evil, which contradicts Dave's desire to do good. After this, Irmaplotz becomes an antagonist, seeking revenge for being dumped.
  - Zonthara (voiced by Joan Rivers) is the ruler of Hyrogoth and Irmaplotz's mother.
- Ned Frischman (voiced by Richard Steven Horvitz) is a nerd who works at a pants factory in the year 1994. He gains a radioactive zipper which he uses to travel back into time to attempt conquering the world by using the advanced technology of the future, such as the Game Guy (a parody of a Game Boy) and a joke book from the 1940s.

== Production ==
The series was created and written by Doug Langdale. After premiering on Disney in 2004, it aired on Toon Disney a year later. In Latin America, the show was broadcast on Jetix.

The series juxtaposes both the ancient and modern. Candy, for example, shops in the local mall and uses the crystal ball for online shopping sprees.

Occasionally, the series breaks the fourth wall with a character complaining about a plot, directly addressing the audience, or communicating to the narrator. Characters can sometimes be offended by how the narrator describes them, including Oswidge in "Sorcerer Material". In "The Maddening Sprite of the Stump", the show's narrator skips over a fight scene, asking viewers to imagine an epic battle and explaining that "a low budget show" like Dave the Barbarian did not have the expenses to animate such a scene. In "A Pig's Story", the series antagonist realizes the show's narration leads to his losses, so he types favorable situations and hypnotizes the Storyteller into reading the voice-over, culminating in a theme song for the antagonist; ultimately, the narrator's laryngitis makes him lose his voice and foil the evil plan.

== Episodes ==
No.	Title	Directed by	Written by	Storyboarded by	Original release date	Prod. code
1	"The Way of the Dave"	Howy Parkins	Doug Langdale	David Feiss & Brad Vandergrift	February 6, 2004	101
1	"Beauty and the Zit"	Howy Parkins	John Behnke & Rob Humphrey	Chong Lee	February 6, 2004	101
Candy's quest for an ultra-trendy antler hat takes her outside of the kingdom and in direct conflict with Chuckles the Silly Piggy. Candy demands Oswidge come up with a magic spell to remove a pimple from her face on the night of the Barbarian Ball, but the zit turns into a zit monster who is bent on taking her back. However, it turns out that the monster only wants to be her date to the dance, and the two perform a song called "Candy and the Zit" that parodies the song "Beauty and the Beast".
2	"Sorcerer Material"	Howy Parkins	Doug Langdale	Wendy Grieb	February 20, 2004	102
2	"Sweep Dreams"	Howy Parkins	John Behnke & Rob Humphrey	Dave Filoni	February 20, 2004	102
Uncle Oswidge has the "hiccats" and the gang needs to go to Malsquando's for a cure, only to disccover that Malsquando knew Oswidge way back when. The villainous Malsquando tells Dave and Fang that Uncle Oswidge worked in a cafeteria and never went to sorcery school, hoping to break Oswidge's confidence and clear his path to world domination. The rest of the family runs away from the castle to avoid Dave's spring cleaning. Dave uses Dusty, the magical cleaning broom, and sweeps the castle. After months of cleaning, Dave is in need of one more thing, Castle Polish, causing him to be lured into Chuckles' lair without Lula. Chuckles imprisons Dave, Fang, Oswidge, and Faffy, making them clean for him and leaving Candy and Lula as their only shaky hope.
3	"Pet Threat"	Howy Parkins	Tom Minton	Debra Pugh	January 23, 2004	103
3	"Lula's First Barbarian"	Howy Parkins	Evan Gore & Heather Lombard	Jim Shellhorn	January 23, 2004	103
Faffy is sad because the family forgot to get him anything during Dragon Appreciation Week, so Dave buys Faffy a diseased weasel for a pet. The diseased weasel gets all of Dave's attention, so Faffy runs away. The weasel turns out to be Chuckles the Silly Piggy, who wants to steal a magical fruit hidden in Faffy's room. Lula's old owner, Argon the Ageless, comes to town, and Lula wants to find some way of getting him to come back to her.
4	"Civilization"	Howy Parkins	Kevin Hopps	Brad Vandergrift	January 30, 2004	104
4	"The Terror of Mecha-Dave"	Howy Parkins	John P. McCann	Chong Lee	January 30, 2004	104
Candy sets her sights on making Fang presentable in high society. Dave fears he has been brainwashed to act like a bully by Chuckles the Silly Piggy when he hears rumors about himself ruining towns while on the way to the fabled Cliffs of Fabulous Shopping.
5	"King for a Day or Two"	Howy Parkins	Mark Drop	Wendy Grieb	January 23, 2004	105
5	"Slay What?"	Howy Parkins	Ralph Soll	Dave Filoni	January 23, 2004	105
Dave in his capacity as temporary ruler of Udrogoth forces the citizenry to attend his musical production "Oh, Pastry!", allowing Chuckles the Silly Piggy to invade. Fang's barbarian idol, Strom the Slayer, arrives in town to slay an unsuspecting Faffy, so the barbarians must do whatever it takes to keep Faffy safe.
6	"Here There Be Dragons"	Howy Parkins	Doug Langdale	Debra Pugh	February 27, 2004	106
6	"Pipe Down!"	Howy Parkins	Larry Spencer	Dave Schwartz	February 27, 2004	106
Faffy's allegiance to his dragon brethren makes it tough for Dave to reverse the unnatural heat wave that has struck Udrogoth. Dave's horrendous playing of the Garglepipes, a bagpipe-like instrument, is enough to stir Quosmir from his subterranean resting place.
7	"Termites of Endearment"	Howy Parkins	Kevin Hopps	Brad Vandergrift	March 19, 2004	107
7	"Thor, Loser"	Howy Parkins	Beth Fieger Falkenstein	Chong Lee	March 19, 2004	107
Vermites (termites that eat anything and everything) destroy Dave's boutique, causing Dave to embark on a quest to defeat them. He reaches the colony's mound, only to find out that they are being controlled by the Dark Lord Chuckles the Silly Piggy. Lula tries to impress her sister Molly, who always looked down on her, by making Dave pretend to be a brave hero, dressing Fang up as an elf, etc. However, after Lula tells her sister the truth, Thor comes to reclaim his magical hammer, which turns out to be Molly.
8	"The Maddening Sprite of the Stump"	Howy Parkins	Mark Drop	Wendy Grieb	January 23, 2004	108
8	"Shrink Rap"	Howy Parkins	David Warick & Amy DeBatrolemis	Dave Filoni	January 23, 2004	108
Lula gets stuck in a tree stump during Dave's attempt to guard the Enchanted Forest against a giant man-eating muffin. When the royal family is unable to free Lula, a tiny, winged sprite establishes himself as the ruler of Udrogoth. Dave believes helping others is his whole purpose in life and starts giving out advice as a "psychofloobicologist", later giving advice to Quosmir.
9	"Beef!"	Howy Parkins	Brian Palermo	Dave Schwartz	January 23, 2004	109
9	"Rite of Pillage"	Howy Parkins	Evan Gore & Heather Lombard	Debra Pugh	January 23, 2004	109
Candy seeks instant muscle gratification, but the magic broccoli she eats to strengthen her muscles makes her dumber and wanting to eat more. Dave faces a dilemma, where he will lose his barbarian title and disgrace his family if he cannot pass a pillaging test.
10	"Band"	Howy Parkins	Doug Langdale	Brad Vandergrift & Jim Shellhorn	February 13, 2004	110
10	"Web"	Howy Parkins	John Behnke & Rob Humphrey	Chong Lee & Kenny Thompkins	February 13, 2004	110
Fang unknowingly invents rock n' roll, leading to her forming, along with Dave, Candy, Oswidge, Lula, Faffy, and a donkey, the wildly successful band the Barbarian Six + Donkey. However, Chuckles the Silly Piggy disguises himself as a music producer and fools the band as part of a plan to destroy them for good. Candy has difficulty paying off an expensive spending spree after she discovers that online shopping is possible. She later finds out that Chuckles the SIlly Piggy and the Queen of the Mole People are also in debt for the same reason.
11	"Girlfriend"	Howy Parkins	Ralph Soll	Wendy Grieb	January 23, 2004	111
11	"Ned Frischman: Man of Tomorrow"	Howy Parkins	Evan Gore & Heather Lombard	Dave Filoni	January 23, 2004	111
Dave begins dating Princess Irmaplotz but breaks up with her when he learns that she is evil. Irmaplotz is upset about the breakup and sends an army of filthy pixies to attack Udrogoth. A nerd named Ned Frischman travels back in time and tries to take over the ancient world using video games. When everyone is hooked on the video games, Faffy, Lula, and Twinkle The Marvel Horse (being the only ones without thumbs) must face off against Ned.
12	"The Princess and the Peabrains"	Howy Parkins	Earl Kress	Debra Pugh	March 26, 2004	112
12	"Horders and Sorcery"	Howy Parkins	Billiam Coronel	Dave Schwartz	March 26, 2004	112
Candy makes her friends princesses while she leaves to have fun. Meanwhile, Chuckles the Silly Piggy and his dim-witted but kind nephew Knuckles are planning to take over Udrogoth, despite the fact that Knuckles really wants to be the Harvest Hog. Fang tricks Dave into thinking he's going to a hat show, only for him to realize that he is really in warrior boot camp. Fang wants to be a warrior, but she is too small. After he fails tests in sword fighting and amoeba wrestling, she lures Malsquando to the Mongrel Hordes Boot Camp with his army of giant potato bugs in order to show the camp leader her talent for bug-squashing.
13	"The Brutish Are Coming"	Howy Parkins	Kevin Hopps	Wendy Grieb	April 30, 2004	113
13	"The Lost Race of Reeber"	Howy Parkins	John P. McCann	Dave Filoni	April 30, 2004	113
Dave and Fang try to protect Udrogoth from invading monsters by turning Faffy into a monstrous guard dragon using Oswidge's magic; but they fail to specify what Faffy should guard, so he goes on a rampage guarding everyone from everyone else. Princess Candy must help the Lost Race of Reeber reclaim its land from Invisigoth invaders.
14	"Lederhosen of Doom"	Howy Parkins	Ralph Soll	Debra Pugh	October 2, 2004	114
14	"Floral Derangement"	Howy Parkins	Earl Kress	Dave Schwartz	October 2, 2004	114
Fang gets some pants sent by her parents, but doesn't bother to read the note that came with them. This is problematic, because the note explains that the pants are an evil trouser beast that will take control of anyone who wears them. Fang loves the pants at first because they give her fantastic strength — at last she's as strong as Dave — but soon the pants take her over, using her as a tool to get revenge on their hated foe Oswidge. When Fang messes with Dave's life once too often, he threatens to send her to Ms. Bluelung's School for Really Cute Little Girls, an educationally evil punishment which Princess Candy suggested. In order to avoid being sent to Ms. Bluelung's, Fang must promise to stop messing with Dave's life, but she breaks her promise. She swipes some of Oswidge's magic and makes some of Dave's flowers — his prized Purple Winkies — grow huge. The resulting gigantic, ravenous flowers cause a few problems, which Fang struggles to conceal from Dave.
15	"Fiends and Family"	Howy Parkins	Doug Langdale	Debra Pugh	January 21, 2005	115
15	"Plunderball"	Howy Parkins	Evan Gore & Heather Lombard	Brad Vandergrift & Dave Schwartz	January 21, 2005	115
When her parents announce that they have to start their quest all over again, Fang is crushed, and cheering her up is a Herculean task. Meanwhile, the Dark Lord Chuckles the Silly Piggy disguises himself as Fang's father as part of a plot to steal a magical artifact. Dave finds himself coaching Udrogoth's Plunderball team in the big annual game, a job he knows nothing about. Things gets worse when the opposing team's coach is Dave's ex-girlfriend, Princess Irmaplotz.
16	"A Pig's Story"	Howy Parkins	Paul Rugg & Doug Langdale	Wendy Grieb & Dave Filoni	December 27, 2004	116
The Dark Lord Chuckles the Silly Piggy has a plan that can't fail: he coerces the Storyteller (the series narrator) into reading a script in which Dave loses. Chuckles soon finds himself not only master of the world but also the new star of the show, which has been renamed The Dark Lord Chuckles the Silly Piggy Will Destroy You All Variety Hour. When the Storyteller gets laryngitis, it looks like the winner will be whoever can find the best new narrator.
17	"Not a Monkey"	Howy Parkins	Evan Gore & Heather Lombard	Wendy Grieb	January 22, 2005	117
17	"Happy Glasses"	Howy Parkins	Doug Langdale	Dave Filoni	January 22, 2005	117
Fang gets an illness, so Uncle Oswidge and Dave take her to the doctor. The doctor says that Fang has an illness that only monkeys get. Fang can obtain a cure only from an island far, far away. The cure is berries. After a long cruise, they reach the island, and Fang sets out to find the berries; but she is taken away by a pack of monkeys that coincidentally look just like her, and Fang begins to wonder if she actually is a monkey. They accept her at first but when she eats the berries and isn't cured, Fang realizes she is not a monkey. She is in trouble when she gets chased by monkeys, Dave is chased by gorillas, and Faffy is chased by lemons. Lula, meanwhile, stays at the hotel. Chuckles sets to defeat Dave once again, he gives the gang fabled 'rose-colored' glasses that make whoever is wearing them see the world as they really want it to be. Chaos is started when the glasses are worn by Fang, Oswidge, Candy, Faffy, and Dave.
18	"That Darn Ghost!"	Howy Parkins	Evan Gore & Heather Lombard	Chong Lee	December 28, 2004	118
18	"The Cow Says Moon"	Howy Parkins	Doug Langdale	Brad Vandergrift	December 28, 2004	118
Candy discovers that she is the only person in Udrogoth who does not have a ghost haunting her house. Caring for their sister, Dave and Fang go down to the local ghost shop and hire a ghost. The ghost throws a huge ghost party, and everyone's ghost attends. After Candy tries to kick them all out, the ghosts get angry and chase the gang around Udrogoth. Evil Princess Irmaplotz summons forth a cow-like something to bite Dave; then a month later, when the moon is full, Dave turns into a were-cow. Oswidge tries to cure him by having something else bite him, and various were-hijinks ensue.
19	"Night of the Living Plush"	Howy Parkins	Mark Drop	Brad Vandergrift & Shane Zalvin	December 29, 2004	119
19	"I Love Neddy"	Howy Parkins	Evan Gore & Heather Lombard	Chong Lee	December 29, 2004	119
Candy has bought too many plush animals. When her room explodes from being stuffed with too much fluff, she finally realizes that she needs to buy more. Chuckles discovers that Candy needs plush toys, and disguises himself as a piggy doll. After Candy buys him and takes him home, she immediately leaves to buy more. Chuckles, using his amulet, creates an army of her plushies in an attempt to conquer Udrogoth. Ned Frischman returns to the past, attempting to conquer the world using jokes. He becomes the most beloved man in the world, and creates a sitcom called I Love Neddy. In order to stop Ned's conquest of the planet, Dave and the gang create the world's first reality program, Real Life Barbarians, which soon becomes more popular than I Love Neddy. Ned tries to stop Dave and the gang with his jokes, and all seems lost until Dave grabs "convenient feathers" and tickles Ned back to the future.
20	"Red Sweater of Courage"	Howy Parkins	Brian Palermo	Brad Vandergrift	January 17, 2005	120
20	"Dog of the Titans"	Howy Parkins	Evan Gore & Heather Lombard	Chong Lee	January 17, 2005	120
To make Dave brave, Fang makes him wear the Red Sweater of Courage; but Dave becomes so brave that he insults Chuckles, Malsquando, and Quosmir, so the three villains team up to destroy Udragoth. Dave feels unappreciated at home, so he goes to Titan Meadows where he becomes the pet of a giant. Dave likes being a pet, so Fang competes against Dave in a pet show so that the family can get him back.
21	"Shake, Rattle, & Roll Over"	Howy Parkins	John Behnke & Rob Humphrey	Dave Schwartz	December 30, 2004	121
21	"Bad Food"	Howy Parkins	Thomas Hart	Debra Pugh	December 30, 2004	121
While retrieving the magical Combat Rattle from an ancient temple, Faffy causes a statue to come to life and attack Dave and the others. When Dave decides to get Faffy trained, Chuckles disguises himself as a dragon trainer in order to steal the Combat Rattle. Dave gets an ingrown toenail, so he quits being a barbarian and starts a restaurant. When the rest of the family tries to ruin Dave's restaurant by stealing his cookbook, Dave starts making recipes from an evil cookbook, causing all of his cooking to come to life and attack.

== Awards and nominations ==
- Annie Awards

2005 – Storyboarding in an Animated Television Production – Wendy Grieb for episode "The Maddening Sprite of the Stump" (Won)
2005 – Writing in an Animated Television Production – Evan Gore & Heather Lombard for episode "Ned Frischman: Man of Tomorrow" (Nominated)
