= Cheryl Blaylock =

American puppeteer (born 1953)

- Born: 1953 (age 72–73); Kalamazoo, Michigan, U.S.
- Other names: Cheryl Blalock
- Occupation: Puppeteer
- Years active: 1979-present
- Known for: Eureeka's Castle
- Notable work: Eureeka's Castle; Sesame Street; The Muppets Take Manhattan

Cheryl Blaylock (also known as Cheryl Blalock; born 1953) is an American puppeteer who performed the title character on Eureeka's Castle from 1989 to 1991. Blaylock is originally from Kalamazoo, Michigan. Before she starred in the title role on Eureeka's Castle, she performed on Sesame Street and in The Muppets Take Manhattan. After Eureeka's Castle, Blaylock played characters on other projects like Oobi, The Adventures of Timmy the Tooth, and Blue's Room.

== Filmography ==
- Sesame Street – Mona Monster, Blue Honker, Forgetful Jones' cousin, Forgetful Jones's mother, Princess Katie, additional Muppets
- The Muppets Take Manhattan – additional Muppets
- Eureeka's Castle – Eureeka
- The Adventures of Timmy the Tooth – Bubbles Gum
- Muppet Classic Theater – additional Muppets
- Little Muppet Monsters — Cow, Raggmopp
- Oobi – Frieda the Foot
- Blue's Room – Frederica "Fred"
- The Planet Matzah Ball – Tina
