= Greg Ballora =

American puppeteer

- Born: 1965 (age 60–61); Bergenfield, New Jersey, U.S.
- Other names: Gregory Ballora; Gregory B. Ballora; Gregory Bellora
- Occupation: Puppeteer
- Years active: 1990–present

Greg Ballora (born 1965, and also known as Gregory Ballora, Gregory B. Ballora and Gregory Bellora) is an American puppeteer.

== Filmography ==
=== Film ===
- Men in Black II – Sleeble
- The Muppets – Additional Muppet Performer
- The X-Files – Creature #2
- The Happytime Murders – Additional Puppeteer
- The Super Mario Bros. Movie – Random Citizen #5, Additional Voices

=== Television ===
- Bizaardvark – Hair Puppeteer (in "Pretty Con")
- Greg the Bunny – Various
- Muppets Tonight – Additional Muppets
- Lost on Earth - Philippe
- The Adventures of Timmy the Tooth – Emmett the Mailbox, Various
- The Crayon Box - Puppeteer
- The Mr. Potato Head Show – Baloney

== Crew work ==
- Billy & Mandy's Big Boogie Adventure – Grim (puppeteer)
- Crash & Bernstein – Puppet Captain
- RoboCop 2 – Robot Monster Crew (movement)
- Team America: World Police – Lead Puppeteer
- The Flintstones – Puppeteer
