= Brian Jacobs =

American actor

- Born: United States
- Occupation: Actor
- Years active: 1997–present

Brian Jacobs is an American actor, who has appeared extensively on television shows and national commercials. Originally from New York City, he now resides in Los Angeles.

== Career ==
He is known for his starring role on The Mr. Potato Head Show, as well as guest starring on Star Trek, Lincoln Heights, LAX (with Heather Locklear), Will & Grace, Sabrina the Teenage Witch, Sunset Beach, Time of Your Life, The Nightmare Room, Martial Law, 3rd Rock From the Sun, and for comedy skits on The Tonight Show. Film appearances include The Golden Age, Woke, The Last Spin, Amazon Warrior, and Ghost World.

== Filmography ==
=== Film ===
Year	Title	Role	Notes
1998	Amazon Warrior	Marauder	Uncredited
2001	Ghost World	Soda Customer	
2008	Woke	Jon the Realtor	
2017	The Golden Age	Barry Rosenthal	

=== Television ===
Year	Title	Role	Notes
1997	3rd Rock from the Sun	Handler #1	Episode: "A Friend in Dick"
1998–1999	The Mr. Potato Head Show	Aron / Mr. Happy Whip	12 episodes
1999	Sunset Beach	Harrison	Episode #1.598
1999	Martial Law	County Clerk Williams	Episode: "Sammo Blammo"
1999	Will & Grace	Michael the Cater Waiter #5	Episode: "To Serve and Disinfect"
2000	One World	Squeaky the Clown	Episode: "Coming of Age"
2000	Time of Your Life	Paul	Episode: "The Time They Found a Solution"
2001	The Nightmare Room	Magician	Episode: "Scareful What You Wish For"
2001	Star Trek: Enterprise	Athan	Episode: "Terra Nova"
2002	Sabrina the Teenage Witch	Eddie	Episode: "Deliver Us from E-Mail"
2004	LAX	Photo Phil	Episode: "Unscheduled Arrivals"
2008	Lincoln Heights	Myles Brendon	Episode: "The New Wild Ones"
