= Muppet Classic Theater =

1994 The Muppets film

- VHS cover
- Directed by: David Grossman
- Written by: Jim Lewis; Bill Prady
- Based on: The Muppets by Jim Henson
- Produced by: Ritamarie Peruggi
- Starring: Dave Goelz; Jerry Nelson; Steve Whitmire; Frank Oz
- Edited by: Jane Allison Fleck; Terence Curren
- Music by: David Lawrence
- Production company: Jim Henson Productions
- Distributed by: Buena Vista Home Video
- Release date: September 27, 1994
- Running time: 68 minutes
- Country: United States
- Language: English

Muppet Classic Theater (also known as Muppet Family Theater in the Republic of Ireland and Muppet Fairy Tales in the United Kingdom) is a direct-to-video musical comedy film featuring The Muppets. It is the first direct-to-video feature film in The Muppets franchise. The film was released on September 27, 1994.

== Plot ==
It consists of six stories from the fairy tale tradition, all performed by the Muppet characters and narrated by Gonzo and Rizzo at the Muppet Theater:

=== The Three Little Pigs ===
A Papa pig tells his three children Andy, Randy, and Sandy (played by Miss Piggy) that it is time for them all to live on their own. Papa tells Andy and Randy that they are strong smart boys who can take care of themselves, but they need to look after their sister Sandy. While the two brothers build flimsy homes of straw and sticks, Sandy constructs a state-of-the-art brick house. At night, The Big Bad Wolf comes and blows down Andy and Randy's houses. The siblings turn to Sandy for shelter, and she only lets them stay if they promise to show her some respect. The Big Bad Wolf returned the next day demanding that Sandy lets him in and reminds the pigs that they are supposed to say "Not By the Hair of My Chinny Chin Chin." Sandy opens up the door and karate chops the Big Bad Wolf when she accuses him of his claim that she has facial hair. The Big Bad Wolf then starts to blow Sandy's house down which has no effect. Then the Big Bad Wolf disguises himself as the pizza delivery man only for Sandy to take the pizza. The Big Bad Wolf's last plan involves dressing up as Santa Claus and going down the chimney. Andy and Randy almost fall for this until Sandy reminds them that it is the middle of summer. When Andy and Randy think that Santa Claus came early, Sandy ends up lighting a large firecracker in the chimney which launches the Big Bad Wolf into the sky.

Song: "Show Me Some Respect"

=== King Midas ===
King Midas (played by Kermit the Frog) spares the life of a satyr (played by Gonzo) that was sleeping in his garden after the satyr offers to grant King Midas a wish. While King Midas wants world peace, Queen Midas (Played by Piggy) wants money and they are granted the Golden Touch. King Midas then uses his talents to turn people's items into gold. When King Midas accidentally turns himself to gold, Queen Midas tries various attempts to get him back to normal. The satyr tells her that the effects of the Golden Touch can be undone if she renounces her interest in gold. The satyr then offers to give King and Queen Midas another wish for free. While King Midas still wanted world peace, Queen Midas wanted a Slice-O-Matic in green. Rizzo the Rat narrated that King Midas, Queen Midas, and the satyr used the Slice-O-Matic to throw fabulous dinner parties for everyone in the kingdom.

Song: "The Midas Touch"

=== The Boy Who Cried Wolf ===
The repeated overreactions of a young shepherd (played by Gonzo) cause the villagers and their mayor (played by Kermit) to doubt his word when he has made claims of sensing earthquakes and tidal waves. When the wolf shows up and challenges the shepherd to obtain help within 24 hours before he eats his sheep, the shepherd goes through numerous attempts to prove that the wolf is threatening the sheep. After all attempts have failed, the sheep state that the shepherd learned his lesson and protested to end the story before the wolf arrives. Rizzo the Rat narrates that the story is not over yet despite the protests of the sheep and that the wolf would return in one hour. One of the rams mentions to the shepherd and his fellow sheep about his cousin Norman and they come up with a plan. When the wolf arrives, the shepherd stated that the wolf was right about the drop in his credibility as his final quote to him is "big sheep." The wolf ends up being surprised by the arrival of a large ram named Norman who ends up crushing the wolf. The shepherd and the sheep then chant Norman's name. The mayor gives the shepherd a medal for "not crying wolf except when an actual wolf was present". The townspeople and the sheep rejoiced and lived happily ever after while the wolf is still trapped under Norman. When Rizzo asks Gonzo if he has learned his lesson, Gonzo states that he will not overreact again, until Rizzo states that they will be taking an intermission with Rizzo having to explain to Gonzo what an intermission is (American Version). Gonzo and Rizzo signing off the viewers and it is time to polka (European Version).

Song: "Who Do You Think You're Foolin'?"

=== Rumpelstiltskin ===
A sad and lonely King (played by Kermit) turns to his Loyal Royal Advisor to find him a fair young maiden to be his queen, someone who is special. The King also tells his Loyal Royal Advisor that he will be given his own castle if he succeeds. All the fairest maidens in the land were brought to the King's castle so that one of them can become queen. Wanting the attention of the King, a miller claims to the Loyal Royal Advisor that his daughter Piggy can spin straw into gold when he brings her to the King's Castle. Piggy is placed in a room full of straw where the Loyal Royal Advisor orders her to demonstrate her gift that her father claims that she has or else she will be spending the rest of her life in the dungeon. She ends up receiving the assistance of Rumpelstiltskin (played by Gonzo) who spins the straw into gold upon Piggy giving him her necklace. The next morning, the Loyal Royal Advisor discovers the golden straw and states that he will keep an eye on the gold that is present while Piggy spins a second batch of straw into gold. When Rumpelstiltskin returns that night and wants a fee to convert the straw into gold, she is forced by fate to give up her firstborn upon becoming queen in return for the desperately needed services of Rumpelstiltskin. The next morning, the King and the Loyal Royal Advisor came in and found the golden straw. The King married Piggy and the Loyal Royal Advisor got his own castle. When Queen Piggy finally had her child, Rumpelstiltskin came in and states that he will let her keep her child if he can guess his name. If she cannot guess his name by tomorrow, then the child will end up in the possession of Rumpelstiltskin. Piggy called the King, the Loyal Royal Advisor, and her father where she told them the whole truth about her having help in converting straw into gold. The King mentioned that he married Piggy because he loved her and not because of her supposed talent. The four of them get to work at guessing Rumpelstiltskin's name. When the deadline is up, Rumpelstiltskin returns to see if Piggy has guessed his name and nearly gave it away. Upon recalling that Rumpelstiltskin went to summer camp Piggy has her father and the Loyal Royal Advisor grab him while stating to the King that "a good mother always sews their child's name in their clothes before sending them off to camp." Piggy finds the label that lists Rumpelstiltskin's name and reads it out loud. Rumpelstiltskin declares it an outrage while Piggy, the King, the Loyal Royal Advisor, and the Miller celebrate.

Song: "Gotta Get That Name"

=== The Emperor's New Clothes ===
In the kingdom of Fozzalia, three rat tricksters (played by Rizzo the Rat, Yolanda the Rat, and Montague the Rat) are in the town square showing off their Curative Elixirs. Robin the Frog doubts Rizzo's claim while another man stated that the Curative Elixir cured his baldness as a rat is seen on top of his head. Robin states that it is not hair, but a rat on the man's head which the man notices. Rizzo is arrested by the Police Chief and is taken to Emperor Fozzie Bear. Upon being brought to Emperor Fozzie, Rizzo claims to him that the rest of his wardrobe is shabby due to it not being special enough. Rizzo states that he happens to be the finest tailor in all the land. Emperor Fozzie then asks for Rizzo to make him some new clothes as Rizzo sends the Emperor to obtain gold for payment and to meet him in the Royal Dressing Room for a fitting. Rizzo has Yolanda take measurements in preparation for his new clothes while Montague weaves the finest fabric in all the land. Rizzo claims that the special fabric can only be seen by elegant people such as the Emperor. Emperor Fozzie then claims to be able to see the fabric in question. Members of the Emperor's Court claim to not see it until the Emperor claims that they are not "elegant enough." The rats then present Fozzie with his new "clothes" that are on the hanger that Rizzo gives him. Before Rizzo can lead Yolanda and Montague to their next business in Tarzana, Emperor Fozzie states that he will hold a celebration to show off his new clothes with the rats being his guests of honor. At the celebration, Rizzo gives the crowd a heads up stating that Emperor Fozzie's new clothes can only be seen by the elegant. When Emperor Fozzie goes out to show his new clothes, Robin notices that Emperor Fozzie is wearing nothing but his boxers. Emperor Fozzie realizes that Robin is correct as the members of his Court end up using their bodies to cover him. The citizens of Fozzalia think that since Emperor Fozzie is not wearing clothing, then they should not either. Emperor Fozzie tells his people that they should stop doing things just because he does them, and that they should start thinking for themselves. As Rizzo, Yolanda, and Montague try to take their leave, they are caught by the Police Chief. Gonzo narrates that the Emperor and his kingdom learned that it is best to think for themselves and follow their own fashion. As for Rizzo, Yolanda, and Montague, they serve 10 years in the palace dungeon. When Rizzo states that after they get out they should visit a Sultan who is known to be gullible, Yolanda and Montague end up kicking Rizzo.

Song: "Nothing's Too Good for You"

=== The Elves and the Shoemaker ===
A shoemaker (played by Kermit) and his nephew and apprentice Robin are visited by the local banker who demands his money by tomorrow or he will toss them into the street. The shoemaker states that they have not been having good business lately since they have been making ugly shoes and all will be lost if they cannot sell any shoes. When the shoemaker and Robin go to sleep, their house is visited by a group of philanthropic entertainer elves (all dressed like Elvis Presley) and make blue suede shoes. The next morning, the shoemaker and Robin wake up to find the blue suede shoes and many customers waiting outside of their store. By the time night had fallen, every shoe in the shop has been sold and the banker takes the money stating that he will be back tomorrow for the other half of the money. When Robin hopes whoever helped them will return, the shoemaker states that they will be ready to find out who has been helping them. Once the shoemaker and his nephew have fallen asleep, they awoke in time to see the elves working on the blue suede shoes. When morning comes, the store is packed with eager customers and the banker takes the other half of the money. Having studied the look of the blue suede shoes, the shoemaker tells Robin he now knows how to make shoes that are not ugly, and that it is time they thanked the elves for their kindness. Rizzo ends up coming on stage to suggest a gift to give to the elves. The shoemaker and Robin worked through the night to make a special gift to thank the elves. When the elves arrived at midnight, the shoemaker and Robin present them with white sequined jumpsuits. While the shoemaker and Robin live happily ever after, the elves relocated to Las Vegas where they perform two shows.

Song: A special Muppet version of Elvis Presley's "Blue Suede Shoes" called "Bad Shoe Blues"

=== Finale ===
As Gonzo and Rizzo close out the show while dancing with Kermit and Robin, the elves sing "Bad Shoe Blues (Blue Suede Shoes)" during the credits.

== Cast ==
=== Muppet performers ===
- Dave Goelz - Gonzo the Great, Randy Pig, Elvis and Rizzo the Rat (additional dialogue)
- Steve Whitmire - Rizzo the Rat, Kermit the Frog
- Frank Oz - Miss Piggy, Fozzie Bear
- Jerry Nelson - Robin the Frog, Big Bad Wolf, Loyal Royal Advisor, The Royal Jester and Montague the Rat
- Bill Barretta - Bailiff, Elvis
- Julianne Buescher - Yolanda the Rat, Additional Muppets
- Brian Henson - Andy Pig, Elvis, Eugene the Mink, Sheep
- Bruce Lanoil - The Royal Jeweller
- Allan Trautman - Father Pig, The Royal Doctor, Banker, Villager

Additional Muppets performed by Tim Blaney, Cheryl Blaylock, Kevin Carlson, Terri Hardin, Drew Massey, James Murray, Joe Selph, and Michelan Sisti.

== Home media ==
It was released on 27 September 1994, by Buena Vista Home Video under the Jim Henson Video imprint, and was re-released internationally. It has not seen a reprint or re-release in North America, but it has been re-released internationally by Columbia TriStar Home Video.

The film has only seen a DVD release in some European territories such as the United Kingdom, where it was included as a bonus feature on Volumes 2 and 3 of The Very Best of the Muppet Show. Volume 2 contains the first half of the film, while Volume 3 contains the second half. However, while Volume 2 kept the first half how it was, Volume 3 split the second half of the film into three episodes with separate opening/closing titles, leading to some material being removed and errors in continuity.
