= Phil Baron =

American actor

Phillip Baron
- Born: May 10, 1949 (age 76); Cleveland, Ohio, U.S.
- Occupations: Actor, voice actor, puppeteer, musician, songwriter, singer, writer, lyricist, composer, author, cantor
- Years active: 1978–present

Phillip Baron (born May 10, 1949) is an American actor, voice actor, puppeteer, composer, lyricist, writer, author, singer and songwriter who voiced Piglet and Rabbit's brother, Robert Rabbit in the Disney Channel live-action/puppet television series Welcome to Pooh Corner. He was also the voice of the title character and additional characters in the popular Teddy Ruxpin toy-line and wrote many of the toy's books and songs. Then voiced Teddy Ruxpin again, as well as his father, Burl Ruxpin, in the 1987 animated television show The Adventures of Teddy Ruxpin.

He also created, puppeteered and voiced some characters in The Adventures of Timmy the Tooth in the mid-1990s. Outside of children's media, he had a career in music, as half of the comedy/music duo, Willio and Phillio with Will Ryan, and including a stint as an exec for Rhino Records and a songwriter, including songs written and performed (often with Ryan) for Disney children's titles. He also wrote songs for Sesame Street and was an additional puppeteer on Muppets Tonight.

He has become a cantor and serves in this capacity at Valley Beth Shalom synagogue in the San Fernando Valley in Los Angeles, California.

== Filmography ==
=== Film ===
Year	Title	Role	Notes
1982	Magic Journeys	Magician	Short Film, Epcot, Magic Kingdom
1985	Good Citizenship with Winnie the Pooh	Piglet	
1986	Pooh's Great School Bus Adventure	Piglet	Short Film
1987	The World of Teddy Ruxpin: Come Dream with Me Tonight	Teddy Ruxpin (voice)	Direct-to-video
1987	Walk Like a Man	Teddy Ruxpin (uncredited)	
2015	Bride of Finklestein	Dr. Finklestein	Short Film
2015	The Adventures of Biffle and Shooster	Dr. Finklestein	
2015	Woman in Gold	Rabbi	
2019	The Legend of Joan of Arc	Old Louis	

=== Television ===
Year	Title	Role	Notes
1983	Fantasy Island	M.C.	Episode: "The Songwriter/Queen of the Soaps"
1983–1986	Welcome to Pooh Corner	Piglet, Robert Rabbit	
1985	Too Smart for Strangers	Piglet	TV movie
1985–1986	Dumbo's Circus	Additional voices	
1985	ABC Weekend Specials	Teddy Ruxpin, Additional Mudblups	Episode: "The Adventures of Teddy Ruxpin"
1986–1987	The Adventures of Teddy Ruxpin	Teddy Ruxpin, Burl Ruxpin	Main cast; 65 episodes
1988	Bubbe's Boarding House	Bubbe, book, additionals	
1988	Someday, Me	Ralph, Additional Voices	Fisher-Price
1990	A Very Retail Christmas	Puppet Performer	TV movie
1995–1996	The Adventures of Timmy the Tooth	Gus, Leo, Mr. Wisdom, Raz the Beatnik, Sunny the Sun, Walter Crunelemuffin	Direct-to-video
1995	Alef...Bet...Blast-Off!	Grandpa, Mitzvah Mouse, Bermuda Schwartz, additional puppets, extra	
1996–1997	Muppets Tonight	Additional Muppets	5 episodes
1997	The Crayon Box	Hugo, Additional Crayons	
2015	Little Charmers	Additional voices	Episode: "Charm Your Mom Day/A Charming Campout"
