= The Adventures of Puss in Boots =

American animated series

- Genre: Comedy; Adventure; Animation
- Developed by: Doug Langdale
- Showrunner: Doug Langdale
- Voices of: Eric Bauza; Jayma Mays; Paul Rugg; Carla Jimenez; Carlos Alazraqui; Laraine Newman; Grey Griffin; Joshua Rush; Candi Milo; Ariebella Makana
- Theme music composer: Shawn Patterson
- Composer: Shawn Patterson
- Country of origin: United States
- No. of seasons: 6
- No. of episodes: 78 (list of episodes)

Production
- Executive producer: Doug Langdale
- Running time: 23 minutes
- Production companies: DreamWorks Animation Television; Netflix Originals

Original release
- Network: Netflix
- Release: January 16, 2015 – January 26, 2018

The Adventures of Puss in Boots is an American animated television series, starring the character of Puss in Boots from DreamWorks Animation's Shrek film series and its 2011 spin-off film, voiced by Eric Bauza. The series premiered with its first five episodes on Netflix on January 16, 2015; the sixth and final season was released on January 26, 2018.

It also premiered on Boomerang UK on September 3, 2018. The show was removed from Netflix on December 29, 2023, in the US and the special Puss in Book: Trapped in an Epic Tale was also removed on January 26, 2024.

The series is currently available on Peacock as of April 2024.

== Plot ==
The series is set before the events of Puss in Boots (2011) and sees Puss in Boots fight off an endless legion of invaders to protect the previously hidden Spanish town of San Lorenzo, after his actions unintentionally broke the spell that protected its legendary mystic treasure from the outside world. Subsequently, he must find a way to restore the protection spell that will cloak the town once more.

== Episodes ==
The first season was released on January 16, 2015, on Netflix, when the first five episodes were released, with further episodes released in May and September 2015. A second season was released on December 11, 2015. The third season was released on July 15, 2016. The fourth season was released on December 16, 2016. The fifth season was released on July 28, 2017. The sixth and final season was released on January 26, 2018.

An interactive special called Puss in Book: Trapped in an Epic Tale was released on June 20, 2017.

Season	Episodes		Originally released
1	15	5	January 16, 2015
1	15	5	May 8, 2015
1	15	5	September 28, 2015
2	11		December 11, 2015
3	13		July 15, 2016
4	13		December 16, 2016
Special			June 20, 2017
5	13		July 28, 2017
6	12		January 26, 2018

== Characters ==
=== Main ===
- Puss in Boots (voiced by Eric Bauza) is the titular character, a slightly egotistical adventurer who accidentally breaks the barrier around San Lorenzo and decides to stay until the barrier is restored.
- Dulcinea (voiced by Jayma Mays) is a female cat who is Puss's love interest. Mays describes her as sweet and naive, very innocent and sheltered.
- Artephius/The Great Mage Sino (voiced by Paul Rugg) is an elderly alchemist who acts as a mad scientist and later reveal to be Sino's personality in season 6.
- Señora Zapata (voiced by Carla Jimenez) is the Old Woman Who Lived in A Shoe, and the head of the town's orphanage. She is antagonistic towards Puss.
- Mayor Temoroso (voiced by Carlos Alazraqui) is a big guy who likes to keep a low profile by hiding inside barrels. He is also the mayor of San Lorenzo.
- Pajuna (voiced by Laraine Newman) is a Highland cow who is the owner of the local cantina.
- Vina (voiced by Grey Griffin) is an older orphan who makes up facts and sometimes steps into Puss's personal space.
- Toby (voiced by Joshua Rush) is an orphan. He is a pig who idolizes Puss.
- Kid Pickles (voiced by Candi Milo) is a “Runyon-esque” 11-year-old who likes pickles.
- Esme (voiced by Ariebella Makana) is a 5-year-old girl who is described as adorable.
- Li’l Pequeña (voiced by Grey Griffin) is a new girl who is introduced in the fifth season and can sometimes act evil.
- Cleevil/Green Tulpa (voiced by Candi Milo) is a street-smart goblin in her early teens and a Tulpa in season 6.

=== Recurring ===
- Sphinx (voiced by Grey Griffin) is a hairless, winged cat who acts a little like a valley girl and a hipster. She (sometimes) protects the village of San Lorenzo.
- El Moco (voiced by Danny Trejo) is a bandit king who is often foiled in the episodes. A running gag in the series is that everytime he is defeated by Puss, he gets trapped in a wooden box.
- The Duchess/Maldonna Eldritch (voiced by Maria Bamford) is one of the recurring villains in the series. She steals the souls of magicians and sorcerers to use their powers – denying observations that she has no magic of her own- and was involved with Artephius; she also had a previous fight with Puss, in which the latter had cut off her foot. In the fourth episode of season 3, she joins Puss in order to stop the Bloodwolf.
- Jack Sprat (voiced by John Leguizamo) is one of Puss's oldest friends who often gets Puss in trouble with his schemes.
- Uli (voiced by Alan Tudyk) is a clever and manipulative (and somewhat annoying) satyr who initially appears friendly to Puss and his friends, but in reality plots to take over San Lorenzo with the help of the demonic Blood Wolf.
- Goodsword (voiced by John Rhys-Davies for season 1 and voiced by Jeff Bennett thereafter) is an enchanted sword who falls from the sky stuck into a stone, then chooses Dulcinea to be the town's heroine.
- El Guante Blanco (voiced by Jim Cummings) is a black cat with a white front right paw. El Guante Blanco (The White Glove in English) found Puss in the desert after Puss was forced to leave his home town and taught Puss the ways of the sword. El Guante Blanco also wears a hat, belt and sword, but does not wear boots.

Bandits: A large group of thieves who try to steal from San Lorenzo, but the town's protector, Puss In Boots always stops them. Some of them also work for El Moco and they ruled over San Lorenzo once but Puss stops them once again.

== Production ==
The series was announced in March 2014 as part of an agreement between Netflix and DreamWorks Animation, under which the studio will develop more than 300 hours of exclusive programming for the service. In 2015, it was stated that a total of 78 episodes were in production for the series, and they were expected to be released in blocks from 2015 onward in a multi-year deal.

== Critical reception ==
The New York Times gave the first episode a positive review stating that the show "is nicely drawn, and San Lorenzo is populated with some appealingly odd young residents, human and otherwise." Moreover, they praised the humour stating that it was "relatively sophisticated (you could write a psychological treatise on Dulcinea, who has modeled her life on a somewhat vacuous book of epigrams), but not so sophisticated that children will be left behind."

=== Accolades ===
In 2015, the second episode of the series, "Sphinx", was nominated at the Annecy International Animated Film Festival. In 2016, the series won an Emmy Award for Outstanding Casting for an Animated Series or Special.

== Comic book ==
In April 2016, Titan Comics released the first of a two-issue limited series of comic books as a tie-in to the TV show, under the same title of The Adventures of Puss in Boots.
