= The Adventures of Timmy the Tooth =

- Created by: James Murray; Dina Fraboni; Kevin Carlson
- Written by: James Murray; Kevin Carlson; Phil Baron
- Directed by: Rick Locke; James Murray
- Starring: Greg Ballora; Phil Baron; Cheryl Blaylock; Kevin Carlson; Michael Earl; Dina Fraboni; Bruce Lanoil; James Murray; Christine Papelexis; Allan Trautman
- Theme music composer: Joyce Imbesi
- Opening theme: "I Love Adventure" performed by Kevin Carlson
- Composers: Joyce Imbesi; Willow Wray
- Country of origin: United States
- Original language: English
- No. of seasons: 1
- No. of episodes: 10

Production
- Executive producer: Jillian Sosin
- Producer: Dina Fraboni
- Production location: Hollywood Center Studios
- Running time: 25–33 minutes
- Production companies: Bomp Productions; MCA/Universal Home Video

Original release
- Network: Direct-to-video
- Release: April 3, 1994 – January 15, 1995

The Adventures of Timmy the Tooth, or simply Timmy the Tooth, is an American direct-to-video musical puppet series, aimed at children age 2 to 7, produced by Bomp Productions and MCA/Universal Home Video. Ten episodes were released from 1994 to 1995.

== Production ==
The series was created by puppeteers James Murray, Dina Fraboni and Kevin Carlson. Phil Baron co-wrote all episodes with Carlson and Murray. The characters were designed by Drew Massey and Bob Fappiano, with puppets built by Bob Fappiano and additional puppets and marionettes by Christine Papelexis. Composed by Joyce Imbesi, the songs were written by Imbesi and Willow Wray with some by Craig Thomas, Richard Friedman, Tina Mitchell and Jonathan Raines, Murray, Carlson and Baron.

== Plot ==
This show was about the adventures of a talking tooth named Timmy and all his friends of Flossmore Valley as they went on adventures using their imaginations, which would usually have Timmy thwarting bad guys like the Cavity Goon and Miss Sweety or the Gingivitis Gang.

== Characters ==
=== Main characters ===
- Timmy the Tooth (performed by Kevin Carlson) is the main protagonist. He is an adventurous tooth that lives with his best friend Brushbrush and is prone to burst into song.
- Brushbrush (performed by Todd Mattox) – Timmy's pet toothbrush who behaves like a dog. He whispers or bristles his words, although Timmy is the only one who can understand him unlike the other characters. He has the tendency to tickle Timmy often by licking his face.
- Bubbles Gum (performed by Cheryl Blaylock) is Timmy's blue-skinned friend is always ready to help Timmy as well as go on an adventure. She tends to take lead of things, and usually calls Timmy by his full name.
- Miss Flossie (performed by Dina Fraboni) is a cowgirl of sorts who is constantly having a good time. Despite her name, she has a blob-like appearance.
  - Waxie is Flossie's unicorn-type hobby horse.
- Sidney Cyclops (performed by Bruce Lanoil) is a one-eyed male monster and Timmy's friend who wants to become the greatest paper boy in the world. He is much younger than Timmy and looks up to him as his best friend.
- Annette Bruner Prower (performed by Christine Papelexis) is Timmy's yellow-skinned friend is exactly a ditz, but always there for her friends. Her other name is also Full of Jello, her general middle and last names are Bruner and Prower.
- Johnny Paste (performed by Allan Trautman) is a large muscular tube of toothpaste who is another one of Timmy's friends. He is well-meaning, but not all that bright.
- Mr. Wisdom (performed by Phil Baron) is an old wisdom tooth who lives up on Wisdom Mountain. He gives advice to Timmy and his friends when they need it.

=== Supporting characters ===
- Sherry (performed by Allan Trautman) is an elderly female fairy who is the local fortune teller.
- Gil (performed by Allan Trautman) is a grinning green grouper.
- Sunny (performed by Allan Trautman in most episodes, Phil Baron in "Malibu Timmy") is a hot and smiling sun that wears sunglasses.
- Leggs O'Many (performed by Todd Mattox) is a cool piano-playing octopus.
- Nicki and Irene (performed by Christine Papelexis and Dina Fraboni) are the two flowers in Timmy's front yard. They both love the rain and love to be watered.
- Emmett (performed by Greg Ballora) is Timmy's mailbox.
- Thirstin and Windslow (performed by Greg Ballora and Kevin Carlson) are two clouds.
- Clem (performed by Greg Ballora) –
- Bunky (performed by Michael Earl) –

=== Villains ===
- The Cavity Goon (performed by James Murray) is the main antagonist of the series. The Cavity Goon (otherwise known as Goonius Nemesis III) is a disgusting sight...a green creature covered with spots and a mouth full of decayed sharp teeth. He wears clothes that appear to be made of ripped-up leaves and is constantly bothering Timmy and his friends. In the episode "Lost My Brush", he even tried to kidnap Timmy by using the kidnapped Brushbrush to lure him in an attempt to turn him over to the Tooth Fairy for money.
  - Miss Sweety (performed by Bruce Lanoil) is the Cavity Goon's sidekick. She is an enormous peppermint candy on a stick who always joins her boss on his evil plots.
- The Gingivitis Gang are a group of ambiguous creatures and the secondary antagonists. Although their hobbies include looking for trouble and harassing Timmy and his friends, they are not inherently evil and even occasionally assist Timmy.
  - Leo (performed by Phil Baron) is the red-horned, lavender-haired, blue-skinned leader of the Gingivitis Gang who wears a suit and a fedora.
  - Kay (performed by Bruce Lanoil) is the orange-skinned, red haired, female bird-like member of the Gingivitis Gang.
  - Dee (performed by Dina Fraboni) is the blonde-haired, pinkish orange-skinned, female insect-like member of the Gingivitis Gang.
  - Darol (performed by James Murray) is the blue-haired, green-skinned member of the Gingivitis Gang.
  - Nolan (performed by Kevin Carlson) is the rose-colored, yellow-haired, hook-nosed, and green-horned member of the Gingivitis Gang.

== Episodes ==
No.	Title	Directed by	Written by	Original release date
1	"Malibu Timmy"	Rick Locke	James Murray, Kevin Carlson and Phil Baron	April 3, 1994
Timmy and his friends go to the beach, but there is just one problem: Timmy cannot swim, and neither can Waxie! Timmy imagines himself as a lifeguard, and his friends are competing in a surfing competition against the notorious cheater Goon Doggy.
2	"Big Mouth Gulch"	Rick Locke	James Murray, Kevin Carlson and Phil Baron	April 10, 1994
Timmy reads to his friends a western story, where Sheriff Timmy deals with outlaws Goony the Kid and Miss Sweety when they come to Big Mouth Gulch. Note: This is one of two episodes featuring the Cavity Goon where he does not sing.
3	"Molar Island"	James Murray	James Murray, Kevin Carlson and Phil Baron	April 17, 1994
Timmy dreams that he and Brushbrush win a dream vacation to Molar Island, where they help the local tribe when the ancient crown of King Cuspid is stolen by the Gingivitis Tribe.
4	"Lost My Brush"	James Murray	James Murray, Kevin Carlson and Phil Baron	April 24, 1994
The Cavity Goon and Miss Sweety plot to capture Brushbrush in order to bait Timmy and hand him over to the Tooth Fairy.
5	"Rainy Day Adventure"	Rick Locke	James Murray, Kevin Carlson and Phil Baron	May 1, 1994
During a rainy day, Timmy imagines that he is Captain Good Guy, and with First Mate Brushbrush, they set out to save Sunny from the Pirate Cavity Goon and Miss Sweety.
6	"An Eye for a Tooth"	James Murray	James Murray, Kevin Carlson and Phil Baron	May 8, 1994
Sidney Cyclops wants nothing more than to be the greatest paper boy in the world. Unfortunately, he cannot see. It's up to Timmy, Brushbrush and Bubbles to help Sidney. Note: This episode featuring Johnny Paste has eyes closed to pull Sidney Cyclops' legs out of the tree.
7	"Timmy in Space"	Rick Locke	James Murray, Kevin Carlson and Phil Baron	May 15, 1994
Timmy finds his old toy rocket and imagines that he and Brushbrush are astronauts in space. They head to the Planet Shmengee to liberate the space station from the Cavity Goon and Miss Sweety. Note: This is one of two episodes featuring the Cavity Goon where he does not sing.
8	"Spooky Tooth"	Rick Locke	James Murray, Kevin Carlson and Phil Baron	May 22, 1994
Timmy, Brushbrush and Bubbles go to Egypt to undertake official pyramid investigation business exploring the pyramid of King Tooth Uncommon.
9	"Operation: Secret Birthday Surprise"	Rick Locke	James Murray, Kevin Carlson and Phil Baron	June 19, 1994
Convinced his friends forgot his birthday, Timmy visits Mr. Wisdom and is shown what Flossmore Valley would be like if he wasn't around.
10	"The Brush in the Stone"	Rick Locke	James Murray, Kevin Carlson and Phil Baron	January 15, 1995
Timmy gets a case of the nasty, scratchy, itchy polka dots on the day of the Flossmore Valley Fair. It's up to Mr. Wisdom to read Timmy a medieval story about the origins of the childhood disease.

== Cast ==
- Greg Ballora – Emmett, Lifeguard (episode 4), King Louie (episode 7), Thirstin the Cloud (episodes 4 and 9), Clem (episodes 9 and 10)
- Phil Baron – Leo, Mr. Wisdom, Walter Crunelemuffin (episode 1), Sunny the Sun (episode 4), Raz the Beatnik (episode 5), Gus (episode 10)
- Cheryl Blaylock – Bubbles Gum
- Kevin Carlson – Timmy the Tooth, Nolan, Windslow the Cloud (episodes 4 and 9)
- Michael Earl – Miss Flossy, Mumfred the Mummy (episode 6), Mr. Bonkers (episode 8), Bunky (episodes 9 and 10)
- Dina Fraboni – Irene the Flower, Dee
- Bruce Lanoil – Sidney Cyclops, Miss Sweety, Kay, Big Dan (episode 4), Mumfred's Dad (episode 6)
- Todd Mattox – Brushbrush, Leggs O'Many
- James Murray – Cavity Goon, Darol, Bob (episode 4), Skunk the Beatnik (episode 5)
- Christine Papalexis – Annette Bruner Prower, Nicki the Flower, Mumfred's Mom (episode 6)
- Allan Trautman – Johnny Paste, Gil the Grouper, Sherry the Fairy, Sunny the Sun, Vinnie da Guy (episode 3), Rodney the Riddle Spider (episode 6)

== Music ==
Each episode features three songs, excluding the theme song "I Love Adventure", with the exception of Operation: Secret Birthday Surprise, The Brush in the Stone, and An Eye for a Tooth which have four, of which each one is a reprise. The end credits are typically a reprise of the first song, save for Molar Island and The Brush in the Stone.

No.	Episode	Song	Performer(s)	Writer(s)
0	All	"I Love Adventure"	Timmy, Sidney, Bubbles, Miss Flossie, Mr. Wisdom and Cast	Joyce Imbesi and Kevin Quinn
1	"Malibu Timmy"	"Good Day for the Beach"	Bubbles, Timmy, Paste, Sidney and Cast	Phil Baron, Kevin Carlson and James Murray
1	"Malibu Timmy"	"If I Could Only Swim"	Timmy	Imbesi and Willow Wray
1	"Malibu Timmy"	"I'm a Cheater"	Goon and Sweety	Craig Thomas, Carlson and Murray
2	"Big Mouth Gulch"	"It's Story Time Again"	Bubbles and Timmy	Imbesi and Wray
2	"Big Mouth Gulch"	"The Legend of Goony the Kid"	Annette	Carlson and Baron
2	"Big Mouth Gulch"	"Let's Have a Spelling Bee"	Miss Flossie	Imbesi and Wray
3	"Molar Island"	"Today Just Isn't My Day"	Timmy	Imbesi and Quinn
3	"Molar Island"	"Dream Vacation"	Timmy	Tina Mitchell and Jonathan Raines
3	"Molar Island"	"Ooga Booga Soup"	The Gingivitis Gang	Imbesi and Wray
4	"Lost My Brush"	"You Are My Friend"	Timmy	Mitchell and Raines
4	"Lost My Brush"	"Cashin' In"	Goon and Sweety	Imbesi and Wray
4	"Lost My Brush"	"Have You Seen Him?"	Timmy	Thomas
5	"Rainy Day Adventure"	"Rainyday Rag"	Timmy	Carlson and Baron
5	"Rainy Day Adventure"	"Nothing Like a Cloudy Day"	Goon and Sweety	Thomas, Carlson and Murray
5	"Rainy Day Adventure"	"Coral Reef Cafe"	Legs O'Many	Imbesi and Wray
6	"An Eye for a Tooth"	"Special Picnic Bow Tie"	Timmy	Thomas
6	"An Eye for a Tooth"	"One of a Kind"	Sidney, Timmy and Bubbles	Thomas
6	"An Eye for a Tooth"	"If You Could Only See"	Bubbles, Timmy and Sidney	Thomas
6	"An Eye for a Tooth"	"If You Could Only See" (reprise)	Sidney	Thomas
7	"Timmy in Space"	"My Favorite Toys"	Timmy	Imbesi and Wray
7	"Timmy in Space"	"Name All the Planets"	Bubbles and Timmy	Imbesi and Wray
7	"Timmy in Space"	"Here They Come"	Walter Crunelemuffin and Cast	Imbesi and Wray
8	"Spooky Tooth"	"Let's Play Dress-Up"	Timmy	Thomas
8	"Spooky Tooth"	"Cheer Up"	Timmy and Bubbles	Thomas
8	"Spooky Tooth"	"King Tooth"	Mr. Wisdom	Richard Friedman and Baron
9	"Operation: Secret Birthday Surprise"	"It's a Very Special Day"	Timmy	Imbesi and Wray
9	"Operation: Secret Birthday Surprise"	"I'm the Cavity Goon"	Goon and Sweety	Baron, Murray and Carlson
9	"Operation: Secret Birthday Surprise"	"A Friend Like You"	Mr. Wisdom and Timmy	Imbesi and Quinn
9	"Operation: Secret Birthday Surprise"	"A Friend Like You" (reprise)	Cast	Imbesi and Quinn
10	"The Brush in the Stone"	"To the Fair We Go"	Timmy	Thomas
10	"The Brush in the Stone"	"Itchy Polka Dot Blues"	The King	Imbesi and Wray
10	"The Brush in the Stone"	"Not So Sure It's a Forest"	The Gingivitis Gang	Mitchell and Raines
10	"The Brush in the Stone"	"Itchy Polka Dot Blues" (reprise)	Cast	Imbesi and Wray

== Home media ==
The Adventures of Timmy the Tooth aired in syndication from January 16 to 31, 1995. It was announced to be on Peacock upon launch.

== Popular culture ==
- Some of the characters have appeared in the Puppet Greetings cards.
  - The puppet for Annette Bruner Prower was used as Whatnot.
  - The puppet for Bubbles Gum was used as Brenda.
  - The puppet for Sidney Cyclops was used as Eyegore.
  - The puppet for Sunny the Sun was used as Sunny for the "Sunny and Chair" segments.
  - The orange puppet which was used for different characters for this show like King Louie was used as Pho Dude.
  - The puppet for Sherry the Fairy was later used as Madame Bullsheetza.
  - The puppet for Gil the Grouper was later used as Elfish Perchley, Gill O'Reilly, and others.
  - The puppet for Leggs O'Many was later used as a mother octopus in a "Mother's Day" card greeting.
- A short excerpt from the show was shown in the 2001 film American Pie 2, a sequel to American Pie.
- Some of the characters from this show have appeared in FOX's Greg the Bunny as different characters.
  - Cavity Goon was used as Cranky the Camera Man.
  - The Gingivitis Gang were used for background appearances like background crew members.
- In a Season 6 episode of The Fresh Prince of Bel-Air ("Eye, Tooth"), Will, while on the effects of laughing gas, puts a tooth on his head and calls himself "Timmy the Tooth".
- Timmy appeared in three videos uploaded by Carlson on his YouTube channel in 2020 in where Timmy is with his therapist PuppetJi on Zoom during the quarantine caused by the COVID-19 pandemic. Timmy then appeared in a fourth video uploaded in 2021.
