= James Murray (puppeteer) =

American actor and puppetteer

- Born: United States
- Occupations: Actor; puppeteer; writer; producer; director; singer
- Years active: 1985–present
- Notable work: The Adventures of Timmy the Tooth

James Murray is an American actor, puppeteer, voice actor, writer, producer, director, and singer.

== Career ==
James Murray operates in California. With Kevin Carlson and Dina Fraboni, he created and wrote The Adventures of Timmy the Tooth.

== Filmography ==
=== Television ===
- Dinosaurs - Additional Dinosaur Performer
- Ghost in the Shell: Stand Alone Complex - Additional Voices
- Greg the Bunny - Susan Monster, Rochester Rabbit, Various Characters
- History of the World... For Now - Rat Monkey
- Late Night Buffet with Augie and Del - Bongo (assistant puppeteer)
- Life with Louie - Additional Voices
- Mack & Moxy - Clixx
- Telling Stories with Tomie dePaola - Goat, Right Hand of Bambolona
- The Adventures of Timmy the Tooth - Cavity Goon, Walter Crunelemuffin, Bob, Skunk the Beatnik
- The Barbarian and the Troll - Axe, Troll King, Kyle
- The Mr. Potato Head Show - Canny, Dr. Fruitcake, Johnny Rotten Apple, Mr. Giblets
- The Muppet Show - Supporting Muppet Performer

=== Film ===
- Being John Malkovich - Student Puppeteer (uncredited)
- Good Housekeeping: Melody Magic in Music Land - Spider
- Kung Fu Panda 4 - Boastful Komodo, Frightened Ram, Goose Jail Guard, Bunny Bartender
- Muppet Classic Theater - Additional Muppet Performer
- Muppets Most Wanted - LA Muppet Performer
- Teenage Mutant Ninja Turtles III - Splinter
- The Brave Little Toaster Goes to Mars - Iron, Satellite #2
- The Muppets - Additional Muppet Performer

=== Video games ===
- Grand Theft Auto: San Andreas - Pedestrian
- Soma - Eric Darby
- The Bureau: XCOM Declassified - Outsider Commander
- The Darkness II - Peevish, Additional Voices

=== Other ===
- Lady Gaga and the Muppets Holiday Spectacular - Additional Muppet Performer
- The Muppets Take the Bowl - Additional Muppet Performer
- The Muppets Take the O2 - Additional Muppet Performer

== Crew work ==
- Men in Black - Puppeteer
- Monkeybone - Puppeteer
- The Adventures of Timmy the Tooth - Creator, Writer
