= Doug Langdale =

American screenwriter, producer, actor, and voice director

- Born: Doug Langdale; North Hollywood, California, U.S.
- Occupations: Screenwriter, producer, director, actor, voice director
- Years active: 1991–present
- Known for: The Weekenders; Dave the Barbarian
- Spouse: Candie Kelty (m. 2009)

Doug Langdale is an American screenwriter, producer, film director, actor, and voice director, who mostly works on television cartoons, live action and animated films. He has worked with Disney numerous times, as well as the writing partner of Jorge R. Gutierrez.

== Filmography ==
=== Writer ===
- Dogtanian and the Three Muskehounds (2021) (film)
- Maya and the Three (2021) (miniseries)
- Cleopatra in Space (2020–2021) (TV series)
- Vampirina (2019) (TV series)
- Scooby-Doo! Shaggy's Showdown (2017) (film)
- Top Cat Begins (2015) (film)
- Guardians of Oz (2015) (film)
- The Adventures of Puss in Boots (2015) (TV series)
- The Book of Life (2014) (film)
- Scooby-Doo! Stage Fright (2013) (film)
- Teenage Mutant Ninja Turtles (2012) (TV series)
- Big Top Scooby-Doo! (2012) (film)
- Scooby-Doo! Legend of the Phantosaur (2011) (film)
- Kung Fu Panda: Legends of Awesomeness (2011) (TV series)
- The Looney Tunes Show (2011) (TV series)
- El Tigre: The Adventures of Manny Rivera (2007) (TV series)
- Happily N'Ever After (2006) (film)
- The X's (2005) (TV series)
- Dave the Barbarian (2004) (TV series)
- Ozzy & Drix (2002) (TV series)
- House of Mouse (2002) (TV series)
- The Weekenders (2000) (TV series)
- Buzz Lightyear of Star Command (2000) (TV series)
- The Brothers Flub (1999) (TV series)
- The Mr. Potato Head Show (1998) (TV series)
- Pinky, Elmyra & the Brain (1998) (TV series)
- Captain Star (1997) (TV series)
- Project G.e.e.K.e.R. (1996) (TV series)
- Earthworm Jim (1995) (TV series)
- Quack Pack (1996) (TV series)
- The Return of Jafar (1994) (film)
- Darkwing Duck (1991) (TV series)

=== Producer ===
- Cleopatra in Space (2019) (TV series) (executive producer)
- The Adventures of Puss in Boots (2015) (TV series) (executive producer)
- Dave the Barbarian (2004) (TV series) (executive producer)
- The Weekenders (2000) (TV series) (executive producer)
- The Mr. Potato Head Show (1998) (TV series) (producer)
- Project G.e.e.K.e.R. (1996) (TV series) (executive producer)

=== Creator ===
- Project G.e.e.K.e.R. (1996) (TV series) (co-creator)
- The Weekenders (2000) (TV series)
- Dave the Barbarian (2004) (TV series) (creator)
- A Tale Dark & Grimm (2021) (TV series) (co-creator, alongside Simon Otto)
- Samurai Rabbit: The Usagi Chronicles (2022) (TV series) (co-creator)

=== Actor ===
- The Flirt (2020 short) .... Daniel (voice)
- Mothman (2000) .... Agent Fulmer
- Breathing Room (1998) .... Joe the Bitter Punk
- The Mr. Potato Head Show (1998) .... The Writer

=== Story editor ===
- El Tigre: The Adventures of Manny Rivera (2007) (TV series)
- The X's (2005) (TV series)
- Ozzy and Drix (2002) (TV series)
- The Weekenders (2000) (TV series)
- Quack Pack (1996) (TV series)
- Aladdin (1994) (TV series)
- Darkwing Duck (1991) (TV series)

=== Voice director ===
- The X's (2005) (TV series)
- The Weekenders (2000) (TV series)
