= Mr. Potato Head =

American toy

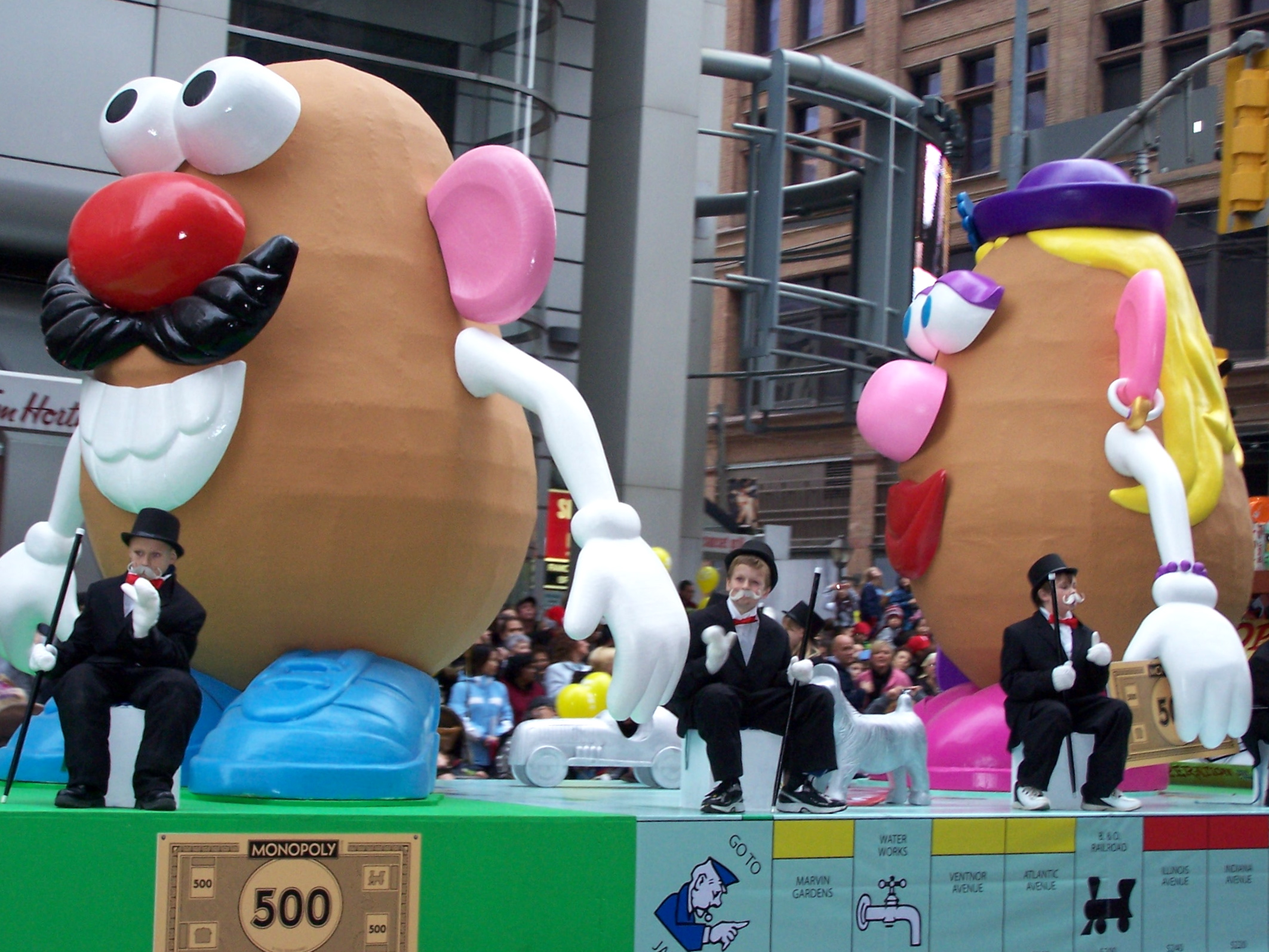
- Mr. Potato Head at a Santa Claus Parade, 2009
- Invented by: George Lerner
- Company: Hasbro; Playskool
- Country: United States
- Age range: 2–6 (1973–1992); 2+ (1992–1996, 1999–present); 2–92 (1996–1999)
- Availability: 1952–present
- Materials: Plastic; Felt (1952–1983)

Mr. Potato Head is a toy produced by Hasbro since 1952. It consists of a plastic model of a potato "head" to which a variety of plastic parts can attach; typically ears, eyes, shoes, hat, nose, mustache, pipe (1952–1987), pants, glasses, and mouth.

Mr. Potato Head was invented and manufactured by toymaker George Lerner in 1949, but was first distributed by Hasbro in 1952. It was the first toy advertised on television and has remained in production since. In its original form, Mr. Potato Head was offered as separate plastic parts with pushpins to be affixed to a real potato or other vegetable. Due to complaints regarding rotting vegetables and new government safety regulations, Hasbro began including a plastic potato body with the toy set in 1964. The original toy was joined by Mrs. Potato Head in 1953 and later supplemented with accessories including a car and boat trailer. Hasbro updated the brand in 2021, dropping the honorific in the name and marketing the toy simply as Potato Head, while retaining the individual characters of Mr. and Mrs. Potato Head.

Mr. and Mrs. Potato Head both appeared in the Toy Story franchise, formerly voiced by the late Don Rickles and Estelle Harris, and recast and later voiced by Jeff Bergman and Anna Vocino for the most recent release. Additionally, in 1998, The Mr. Potato Head Show aired but was short-lived, with only one season being produced. As one of the prominent marks of Hasbro, a Mr. Potato Head balloon has also joined others in the annual Macy's Thanksgiving Day Parade. Toy Story Midway Mania!, in Disney California Adventure at the Disneyland Resort, also features a large talking Mr. Potato Head.

== History ==
=== Creation ===
In the early 1940s, Brooklyn-born toymaker George Lerner came up with the idea of inserting small, pronged body and face parts into fruits and vegetables to create a "funny face man"; however, the exact origin and inspiration for this idea are unknown. One theory is that, as a child, Lerner often took potatoes from his mother's garden and, using various other fruits and vegetables as facial features, made dolls for his younger sisters. In a slight variation of this story, the items he attached to the potatoes were smaller fruits and vegetables. However, others have speculated that he got the idea from his wife's nephew Aaron Bradley, who was seen placing sticks inside of potatoes in the family garden. Yet another version states that Lerner came up with the idea in 1949 and was inspired by his own children, who often played with their food. Various sources list 1949 as the official year that the Funny Face Man was invented.

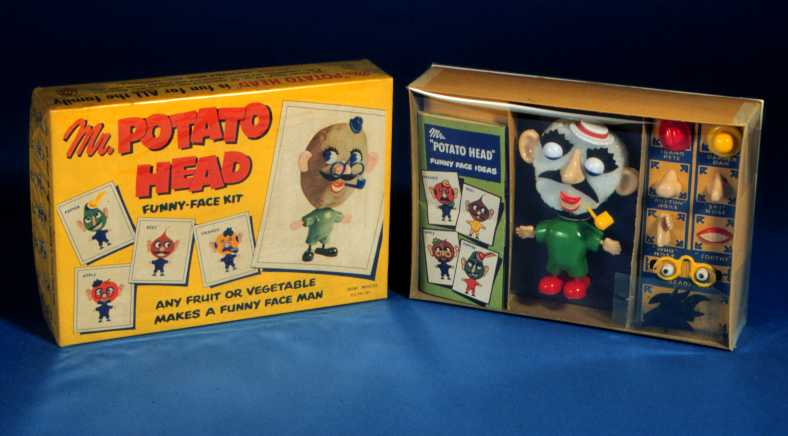
The original 1952 version of Mr. Potato Head

In 1951, Lerner completed a prototype for Funny Face Man. Finding a buyer was initially a challenge because companies thought consumers would be hesitant to waste food so soon after the rationing that was widespread during World War II. However, Post Cereals purchased the rights to Funny Face Man that same year, with plans to include the kits in breakfast cereal boxes. Just a few months later, the toy company Hassenfeld Brothers (now known as Hasbro) and Lerner bought back the rights to Funny Face Man kits from Post. In Hasbro's version, the kits included a styrofoam head. However, because the styrofoam head had limited reusability, the packaging still recommended that the accessories be affixed to potatoes or other produce.

On April 30, 1952, Mr. Potato Head became the first toy advertised on television. The campaign was also the first to be aimed directly at children; before this, television commercials were mostly targeted at adults. The commercial revolutionized marketing by focusing on children as a target audience and encouraging them to convince their parents to buy the product (a concept that came to be known as the "nag factor"). Additionally, between 1949 and 1952, television sales had increased exponentially, and a massive polio outbreak in 1952 resulted in children spending even more time indoors. Over one million kits were sold in the first year.

=== Subsequent developments ===
In 1953, Hasbro introduced a Mrs. Potato Head variant, and soon after, Brother Spud and Sister Yam completed the family, followed by accessories reflecting the affluence of the 1950s: a car, boat trailer, kitchen set, stroller, and pets marketed as Spud-ettes. In the 1960s, Hasbro also introduced the Tooty Frooty Friends kit, which came with over 60 pieces for building four additional characters: Katie the Carrot, Kooky the Cucumber, Oscar the Orange, and Pete the Pepper. Although the toys were originally produced as separate plastic parts to be attached to a real potato or other vegetable, in 1964, Hasbro began to include a separate plastic head and body in each box and made the attachments less sharp, leaving them unable to puncture vegetables easily. These changes were due, in part, to parental complaints about finding spoiled food in their homes, but there were also reports of children choking on the small pieces or cutting themselves with the sharp ends. In 1973, further changes were made to increase safety. To comply with the Child Protection Act of 1966 and the Child Protection and Toy Safety Act of 1969, Hasbro combined the head and body into one large piece and made the attachments larger to prevent choking. Arms were no longer included in the kits. Additionally, Hasbro replaced the holes with flat slots, allowing only one possible orientation for the attached parts. In 1983, Hasbro tweaked the Mr. and Mrs. Potato Head design by adding white bendable arms wearing white gloves. A storage compartment was also added to this larger head/body combination piece.

In 1985, Mr. Potato Head received four postal votes in the run for mayor of Boise, Idaho in the "most votes for Mr. Potato Head in a political campaign" as verified by Guinness World Records. In November 1987, Mr. Potato Head became "Spokespud" for the annual Great American Smokeout and surrendered his pipe to Surgeon General C. Everett Koop in Washington, D.C. In 1989, Hasbro replaced the attached bendable arms with the removable plastic arms. In the 1990s, the League of Women Voters used Mr. and Mrs. Potato Head to promote a "Get Out the Vote" campaign. Additionally, Mr. Potato Head received an award from the President's Council on Physical Fitness and Sports, presented by Arnold Schwarzenegger, who was chairman of the organization at that time.

In 1995, Mr. Potato Head was featured in a leading role in the Disney/Pixar animated feature Toy Story, with the voice provided by comedian Don Rickles. Mr. Potato Head later returned in Toy Story's four sequels — Toy Story 2 (1999), Toy Story 3 (2010), Toy Story 4 (2019), and Toy Story 5 (2026) — with Rickles reprising the role; however, Rickles died in April 2017 due to kidney failure, so Pixar used unused archival audio of his voice for the fourth release, the character being recast and performed by Jeff Bergman in the fifth. Also in 1995, the Mr. Potato Head Pals Mix 'n' Match game was made. This box contained four bodies and four sets each of hands, eyes, noses, mouths, hats, and shoes. Aimed at young children, the goal of the game was to build characters to match the provided cards.

In 2000, Mr. Potato Head was inducted into the National Toy Hall of Fame at The Strong in Rochester, New York. In 2006, Hasbro also began to sell sets of pieces without bodies for customers to add to their collections. Some of these themed sets included Chef, Construction Worker, Firefighter, Halloween, King, Mermaid, Police Officer, Pirate, Princess, Rockstar, and Santa Claus. In the same year, Hasbro introduced a line called "Sports Spuds" with a generic plastic potato (smaller than the standard size) customized to a wide variety of professional sports teams. In 2010, Hasbro received a Toy & Game Innovation Award from Chicago's Museum of Science and Industry. In the same year, Hasbro tweaked the Mr. and Mrs. Potato Head body design to give it a slimmer appearance, commonly referred to as "Active Adventures". As of 2012, sales of Mr. Potato Head and related products were reported to have exceeded 100 million units since the original release. On February 25, 2021, Hasbro dropped the honorific in the brand name and began marketing the toy simply as "Potato Head", while retaining the individual characters of Mr. and Mrs. Potato Head. However, several media outlets misinterpreted the announcement as stating that all Potato Head products would henceforth be gender neutral. While continuing to offer the classic Mr. and Mrs. characters, Hasbro was praised by some for being progressive, although others called it a "PR stunt". Since 2024, new models of the Mr. and Mrs. Potato Head toys have been produced.

== Versions ==
In 1995, to celebrate the release of Toy Story, Hasbro produced the first licensed Mr. Potato Head which used pieces from the 1987 Bucket of Parts (a black derby hat, an orange nose, a long mustache, pink ears, a tall set of eyes, and blue sneakers) to replicate his look from the film.

In the 2000s, Hasbro has produced Mr. Potato Head sets based on several media properties that Hasbro produces toys for under license. These include the Star Wars-themed "Darth Tater", "Spud Trooper", and "R2-POTATOO", a 2007 Transformers film-themed "Optimash Prime" (the appearance is based on Optimus Prime from the original television series), a pair of Spider-Man-themed "Spider-Spud / Peter Tater" (both red suit and black suit, to tie in with Spider-Man 3), an Indiana Jones-themed "Taters of the Lost Ark" set (which, despite the title, was released as a tie-in to 2008's Indiana Jones and the Kingdom of the Crystal Skull), an Iron Man 2-themed "Tony Starch", and a "Trick or Tater" version for Halloween in October 2008. An additional five Star Wars-themed potato heads were sold exclusively through Disney theme parks: "Luke Frywalker", "Yam Solo", "Spuda Fett", "Princess Tater", and "Darth Mash".

In 2009, "Bumble Spud" was produced based on Transformers: Revenge of the Fallen. A Kiss version of Mr. Potato Head was produced recently. Disney, in cooperation with Hasbro, also released "Chipbacca", "Mashter Yoda", and "C-3PotatO" in October 2009 at Disney Parks. To celebrate Toy Story 3, five new Mr. Potato Heads were unveiled including "Woody's Tater Roundup", "Spud Lightyear", "Jessie the Spud-slinging Cowgirl", and the classic Mr. and Mrs. Potato Head. To promote The Looney Tunes Show, Hasbro unveiled Bugs Bunny-, Daffy Duck-, and Tasmanian Devil-themed Mr. Potato Head dolls.

In 2011, it was announced at the New York Toy Fair that a second Elvis Mr. Potato Head (based on his 1968 TV special) would be released, as well as sets for The Wizard of Oz (Dorothy, Scarecrow, Tin Man and the Lion), the Three Stooges, Star Trek (Kirk and Kor), and SpongeBob SquarePants. These were all released through PPW Toys from Hasbro.

In 2012, Hasbro and PPW Toys released Mr. Potato Head in Batman form for the movie The Dark Knight Rises. The model, known as "The Dark Spud", features Mr. Potato Head dressed up as the Caped Crusader. Before the release, the model was unveiled at the 2012 New York Toy Fair. In 2014, to celebrate The Simpsons' 25th anniversary, PPW Toys produced a Homer Simpson-themed Mr. Potato Head.

On April Fools Day 2019, Hasbro jokingly announced that Mr. Potato Head would be replaced by "Mr. Avo Head", a hipster avocado.

To celebrate the release of Toy Story 4, Hasbro produced new Toy Story versions of Mr. and Mrs. Potato Head. These versions feature the "Active Adventures" model of the bodies and ears with a mix of various parts, including the classic versions of the arms and shoes, film-accurate facial features and the newer designs of the parts. Hasbro also produced new "Active Adventures" versions of "Woody's Tater Roundup" and "Spud Lightyear".

In 2020, Hasbro announced a sustainable version of the toy known as Mr. Potato Head Goes Green. This version was made from plant-based plastic derived from sugarcane.

To celebrate Mr. Potato Head's 70th anniversary in 2022, Hasbro produced elderly versions of Mr. and Mrs. Potato Head.

== In popular culture ==
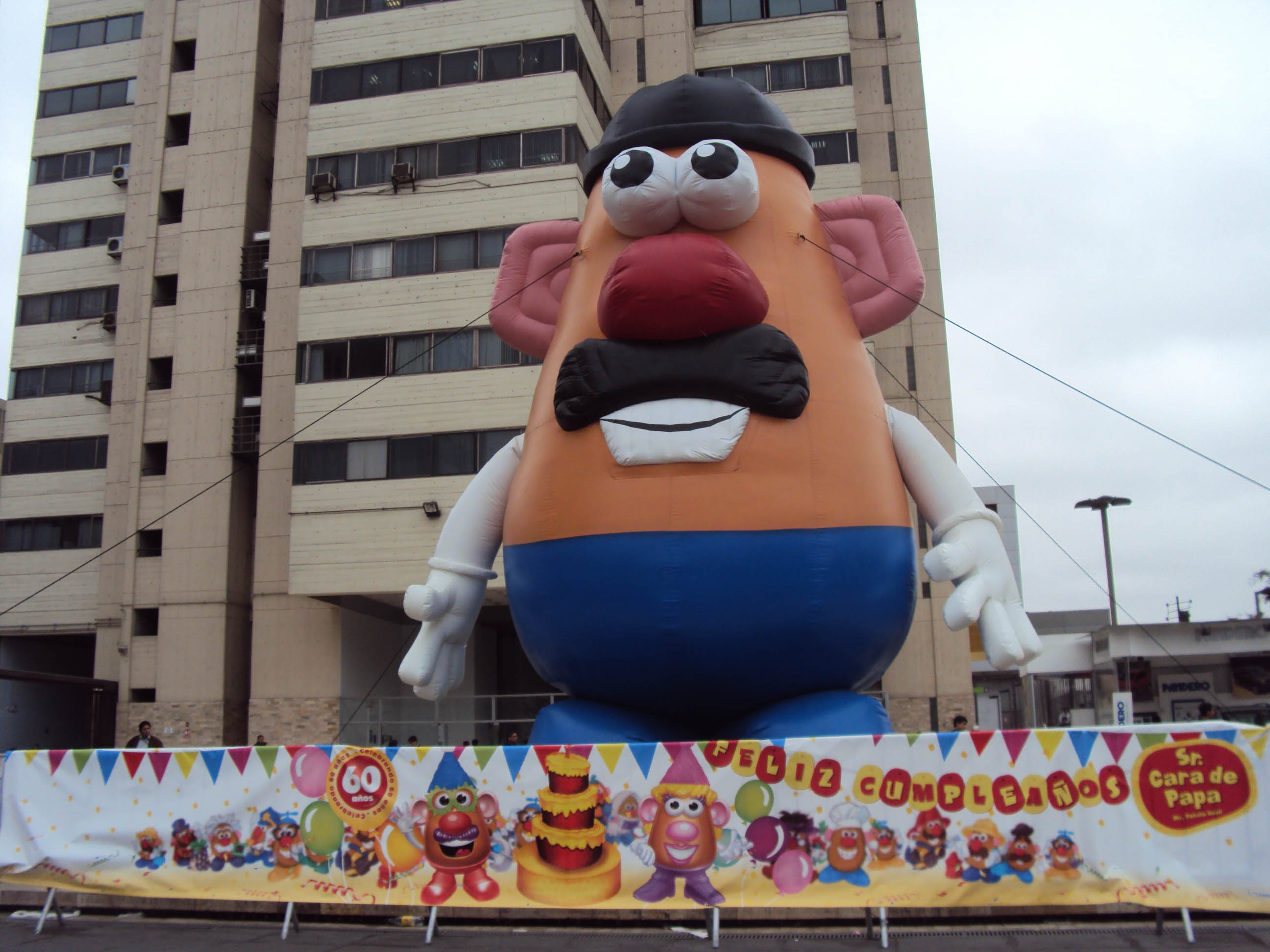
The "Active Adventures" Mr. Potato Head in Lima, Peru, 2012

Mr. Potato Head's popularity has led to some appearances in films and television. From 1986 to 1987, Mr. Potato Head played a supporting role in the short-lived syndicated series Potato Head Kids. From 1998 to 1999, he had his own short-lived Fox Kids series The Mr. Potato Head Show.

In addition to film and television, the character has been the subject of a comic strip created by Garfield creator Jim Davis. Cartoonist Gary Larson included the character in several of his The Far Side cartoons.

In a commercial for Bridgestone tires during Super Bowl XLIII in 2009, Mr. Potato Head is driving a car and Mrs. Potato Head is nagging him. Larger-than-life versions of Mr. and Mrs. Potato Head are "guests" in the 1980s section of Pop Century Resort at Walt Disney World in Florida.NBA champion Head Coach Mike Brown has the nickname "Mr. Potato Head".

Starting in the 2000s, Mr. and Mrs. Potato Head also starred in commercials for other brands. An example is an ad for Lay's in 2014 where the "Active Adventures" Mr. Potato Head comes home to see the "Active Adventures" Mrs. Potato Head eating them despite being a potato herself.

== Toy Story franchise ==
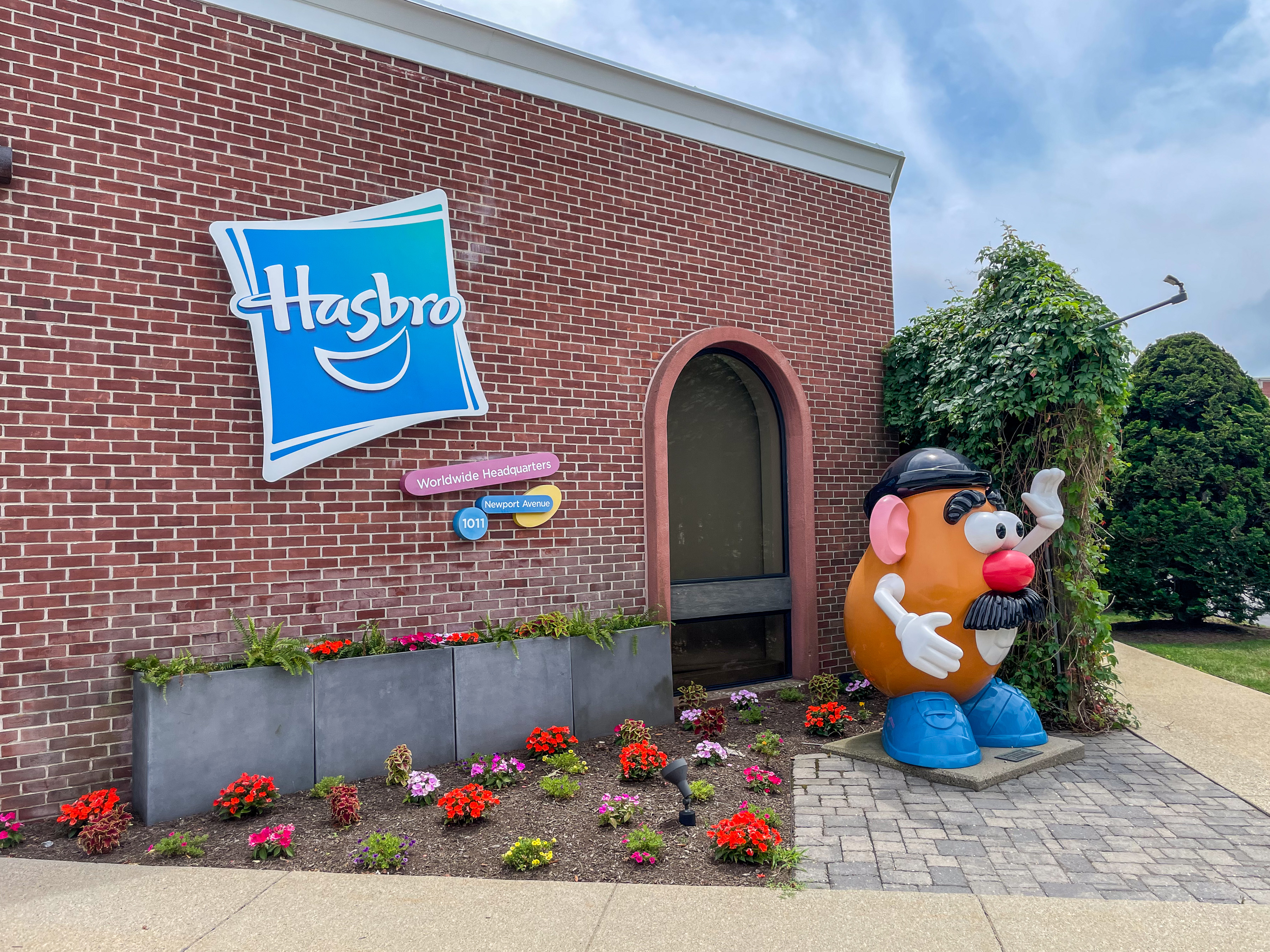
Mr. Potato Head at Hasbro Pawtucket headquarters

Mr. Potato Head is also a character in the Disney/Pixar Toy Story franchise, originally voiced by the late Don Rickles. He was one of Andy's toys before being given to Bonnie in Toy Story 3.

In Toy Story (1995), Mr. Potato Head is shown to be moody towards Andy's other toys, though he is friends with Hamm the piggy bank (John Ratzenberger). When Sheriff Woody (Tom Hanks) accidentally pushes Buzz Lightyear (Tim Allen) out of a window, Potato Head accuses Woody of doing it on purpose. At the end of the film, he is overjoyed to hear Andy's sister Molly getting a Mrs. Potato Head on Christmas.

In Toy Story 2 (1999), Mr. Potato Head goes with Andy's other toys to rescue Woody, who has been stolen by Al McWhiggin (Wayne Knight). After Mr. Potato Head saves three Alien toys (Jeff Pidgeon) from falling out of a Pizza Planet truck, only for them to continually pester him, his wife Mrs. Potato Head (Estelle Harris) decides to adopt them, much to her husband's dismay.

In Toy Story 3 (2010), Mr. Potato Head is one of Andy's remaining toys, alongside his wife, the Aliens, and others. The toys are donated to a daycare center and are later almost killed in a landfill incinerator. When the Aliens rescue the toys with a giant crane, Mr. Potato Head finally accepts them as his sons. Eventually, Mr. Potato Head and his friends are donated to a new owner named Bonnie (Emily Hahn). Toy Story 3 would be the final Toy Story movie that Don Rickles finished voicing Mr. Potato Head in before his death.

Mr. Potato Head has appeared in all three Toy Story Toons shorts: Hawaiian Vacation (2011), Small Fry (2011), and Partysaurus Rex (2012), voiced again by Don Rickles.

He also appeared in the Halloween special Toy Story of Terror! (2013), where he disappears and Bonnie's other toys must find him.

Mr. Potato Head appeared in the Christmas special Toy Story That Time Forgot (2014). It was the last time Rickles voiced him before his death.

Mr. Potato Head appeared in Toy Story 4 (2019). However, Rickles died in 2017 due to kidney failure, and did not record any lines for him for the film. With permission from Rickles's family, Pixar used unreleased lines that Rickles recorded in previous Toy Story films, shorts, specials, video games and other media for his final performance as the character. Mr. Potato Head had seven lines in Toy Story 4, which was dedicated to Rickles's memory. Mr. Potato Head first appears in the prologue of the movie. Later during the main events of the film, he and his wife join Bonnie and her parents on their RV road trip. At the end of the film, they say goodbye to Woody who stays with Bo Peep (Annie Potts) to help find toys for owners.

Mr. Potato Head is seen dancing in a Pixar Popcorn short called "To Fitness and Beyond".

Mr. Potato Head appeared in Toy Story 5 (2026), now voiced by Jeff Bergman, who succeeds Rickles following his death.

== Games ==
On November 13, 1995, a computer game called Mr. Potato Head Saves Veggie Valley was released by Hasbro Interactive.

In 1997, Hasbro Interactive released another game called Mr. Potato Head's Activity Pack.

Mr. Potato Head has also appeared as the host in all installments of the popular video game series Hasbro Family Game Night. He also appeared in several Toy Story-based video games along with Toy Story Activity Center.

== See also ==
- List of toys
- Potato gun
