= George Lerner =

Toy inventor

- Born: 1922; Brooklyn, New York, United States
- Died: 1995 (aged 72–73); United States
- Occupation(s): Artist graphic designer model maker businessman

George Lerner (1922–1995) was an American inventor known for inventing the toy Mr. Potato Head.

== Biography ==
George Lerner was born in Brooklyn, New York. He was artist, graphic designer and model maker. In 1949, he designed and produced a first generation set of plastic face pieces. The push pin shaped noses, ears, eyes, and mouth parts could be pushed into fruits or vegetables to transform the food into playmates. The toy did not take off at first because post-World War II consumers didn't like the idea of wasting food by playing with it. Lerner finally sold the toy for $5,000 to a cereal company. The toys were planned to be a premium giveaway in cereal boxes. But when Lerner found a better deal offered by toy manufacturer Hassenfeld Brothers (now Hasbro), Lerner and the manufacturer bought the rights back for $7,000. Hasbro officially named the toy Mr. Potato Head.

In 1964 and 1975, Lerner's original designs got their plastic head and size upgrades respectively, in order to comply with government issued safety regulations.

Lerner died in 1995.

== Personal life ==
Lerner was Jewish, and was of Romanian-Jewish descent.
