= No, You Shut Up! =

American news talk show

- No, You Shut Up! title card.
- Genre: News talk show
- Created by: David Javerbaum
- Starring: Paul F. Tompkins; Puppeteers: Drew Massey; Ted Michaels; Michael Oosterom; Colleen Smith; Victor Yerrid
- Country of origin: United States
- No. of seasons: 4
- No. of episodes: 58

Production
- Executive producers: Brian Henson; Lisa Henson; David Javerbaum; Billy Kimball; Paul F. Tompkins (Season 4); Nelson Walters (Season 4); Bryan Paulk (Season 4)
- Producers: Rita Peruggi; Vince Raisa; Kevin Haulihan
- Production location: Los Angeles
- Editors: Ryan Etter; Phil Price; Brian Jaggers
- Running time: 15 minutes (Seasons 1–2); 25 minutes (Seasons 3–4)
- Production company: Henson Alternative

Original release
- Network: Fusion
- Release: November 1, 2013 – March 17, 2016

No, You Shut Up! is an American news talk show on Fusion TV that was created by David Javerbaum (the former head writer and executive producer of The Daily Show with Jon Stewart), hosted by Paul F. Tompkins, and produced by The Jim Henson Company under its Henson Alternative banner.

On May 2, 2016, Tompkins announced on his official website that the show had stopped production a quarter into its fourth season.

== Format ==
The show details Paul F. Tompkins and a panel of four different puppets (played by different members of the Miskreant Puppets from Puppet Up! as well as puppets from other shows) debating about the different issues of the day from their unique perspective until they get too angry to discuss them any further. There were some later episodes in which the fourth panelist was an actual celebrity.

When the show returned from commercial, it would typically show footage of what happened during the break (for instance, a panelist talking to the camera or a heated discussion in "Crab Fire" where a Red Republican Crab and a Blue Democrat Crab discusses minor issues). There was also a segment on the show called "No, You Open Up" where Paul F. Tompkins interviews a panelist.

By Season Three, the show was reworked to detail different segments before the round table discussions. During some round table discussions, the featured celebrity panelists would partake in a game with the other panelists.

== Panelists ==
The panelists have included four different characters per episode. Among the known panelists on this show are:

- "A Bird" (performed by Victor Yerrid) – "A Bird" is an unnamed sea gull who lives in a Walmart parking lot. In later episodes Tompkins referred to the character as "Big Dumb Bird." This character was a recycled version of Molly the Albatross from Jim Henson's Animal Show.
- "Grunt" (performed by Donna Kimball) – "Grunt" is a cavewoman born in the year 4,000,000 BC who was frozen in a block of ice and was resuscitated in the year 2009 where she became a news analyst on the Fox News Channel. Her name is the sound of a grunt and is also called "Cavewoman" by Paul. She is a recycled version of the Cavewoman from Puppet Up!.
- Andy Al-Jizah (performed by Brian Clark) – Andy Al-Jizah is a mummy who is the President of the AAMRP (short for American Association of Mummified and/or Retired People).
- Armond Mite (performed by Michael Oosterom) – Armond Mite is a kangaroo rat who is a film critic. Armond Mite's name is a pun on controversial film critic Armond White. He is a recycled version of Cool the Kangaroo Rat from Jim Henson's Animal Show.
- Aunt Mildred (performed by Colleen Smith) – Aunt Mildred is a sloth who is the chairman of the "Traditional Values Coalition." She is recycled version of Lamont the Sloth from Jim Henson's Animal Show and Mopatop's Shop.
- Barry (performed by Victor Yerrid) – Barry is a flying squirrel and life partner of Gary who works as a marriage counselor and a gay rights activist. In "Special Report #2," it is revealed that Barry's last name is Fine. He is a recycled version of Quincy the Flying Squirrel from Jim Henson's Animal Show.
- Bierstin Krakov (performed by Victor Yerrid) – Bierstin Krakov is a vulture from Russia who is a war correspondent and the author of "A Farewell to Arms & Legs." He is a recycled version of Guffrey the Vulture from Jim Henson's Animal Show.
- Bigfoot (performed by Victor Yerrid) – Bigfoot is a libertarian hermit who lives in the woods somewhere in Montana and is the founder of Montana's "Frozen Fan Club" branch. He is a recycled version of Claude Bigfoot from Puppet Up!.
- Billy Cabrito (performed by Allan Trautman) – Billy Cabrito is a goat who is a writer, blogger, and the editor-in-chief of the news outlet called "The Daily Bleet." He is a recycled version of the Goat from Telling Stories with Tomie dePaola.
- Blue Crab (performed by Victor Yerrid) – A blue crab who is the democrat co-host of "Crab Fire." In "Shut Up 2013," it is revealed that the Blue Crab is married to the Red Republican Crab.
- Bo Beetle (performed by Victor Yerrid) – Bo Beetle is a beetle who is a political radio personality and firebrand pundit. Bo Beetle's name is a pun on media personality Bo Dietl. He is a recycled version of a termite from Billy Bunny's Animal Songs.
- Brigham Brigham – Brigham Brigham is a bighorn sheep who is a Mormon preacher. He is a recycled version of Rocky the Bighorn Sheep from Jim Henson's Animal Show.
- Chambray (performed by Ted Michaels) – Chambray is an actor of indeterminate gender. He is a recycled version of Pretty Girl from Puppet Up!.
- Cheetah Grrrl (performed by Donna Kimball) – Cheetah Grrrl is a cheetah blogger from Africa who is an international spokeswoman for the LGBT's Cheetah Community and the World's Fastest Lesbian. She is a recycled version of the Leopard Girl from Puppet Up!.
- Chimp with a Limp (performed by Victor Yerrid) – Chimp with a Limp is a monkey who is a discontinued toy that depicts him with polio and has different phrases when the button on his right corrective shoe is pushed. Chimp with a Limp now works as a consumer report specialist. He is a recycled version of Waffle the Cow-Monkey from Animal Jam.
- Dax Rhesus (performed by Michael Oosterom) – Dax Rhesus is a spider monkey who is a fitness guru. He is a recycled version of Hector the Spider Monkey from Jim Henson's Animal Show.
- Dr. Mooz (performed by Michael Oosterom) – Dr. Mooz is a cow who is a TV doctor and the host of "The Dr. Mooz Show." Dr. Mooz' name is a spoof of Dr. Mehmet Oz. He is a recycled version of Udders McGee from That Puppet Game Show.
- Dr. Phillip Weasel (performed by Victor Yerrid) – Dr. Phillip Weasel (whose last name is pronounce "wee-zel") is a weasel who is a climatologist and an adjunct professor at Dartmouth College. He is a recycled version of a weasel from Puppet Up!.
- Dwayne Johnson (performed by Ted Michaels) – Dwayne Johnson is an igneous rock formation and an observational scientist that is named after the actor of the same name.
- Frankie Lemay (performed by Allan Trautman) – Frankie Lemay is a tropical bird who is the singer, dancer, and entertainer of his show "That's Bananas."
- G. Gerald Mitty (performed by Ted Michaels) – G. Gerald Mitty is a supervillain with plans to take over Earth. The head used for G. Gerald Mitty was recycled from the look-a-like of Yorick from Sam and Friends that was used in the Stuffed and Unstrung version of "I've Grown Accustomed to Your Face."
- Gary (performed by Drew Massey) – Gary is a gerbil and life partner of Barry who works as a marriage counselor and a gay rights activist. He is a recycled version of Pearl the Pika from Jim Henson's Animal Show.
- George Rooney (performed by Michael Oosterom) – George Rooney is a warthog who is an actor. George Rooney's name is a spoof of George Clooney. He is a recycled version of the warthog puppet that was used for Bernice the Warthog and Warren the Warthog from Jim Henson's Animal Show.
- Gordon LeClair (performed by Drew Massey) – Gordon LeClair is a reindeer from Canada who works as a journalist at "The Canuck Chronicle." He is a recycled version of Andrew the Reindeer from Jim Henson's Animal Show.
- Gulag (performed by Michael Oosterom in most episodes, Victor Yerrid in episode 31) – Gulag is a stray dog who came from Sochi, Russia and is adjusting to life in the United States. He is stated to be a Chernobyl Terrier (which is 10% Scottish Terrier, 10% Labrador Retriever, 10% nuclear waste, and the rest of it is Puggle) during his interview with Paul. He is a recycled version of Herman Monster from Puppet Up!.
- Haardvark (voiced by Victor Yerrid) – Haardvark is an aardvark who is Christian rapper and his real name is Stuart Dilworth. He is a recycled version of the aardvark puppet that was used for Arlene the Aardvark and Dullard the Aardvark from Jim Henson's Animal Show.
- Hot Dog (performed by Victor Yerrid) – Hot Dog is a talking hot dog in a moustache who is an actor, a model, and the host of the talk show "Speaking Frankly." In "Shut Up 2013," it is revealed that Hot Dog can't tell the difference between Morgan Freeman and Nelson Mandela. He is a recycled version of a hot dog from CityKids.
- Jeff Marks (performed by Brian Clark) – Jeff Marks is a bear in a goatee who is an entertainment correspondent, owner of the blog "What's Ursine Hollywood," and an internet celebrity. He is a recycled version of the bear puppet that was previously used for Bunnie the Bear from Jim Henson's Animal Show and Max Bear in Episode 4193 of Sesame Street.
- Joe Lunchpail (performed by Drew Massey) – Joe Lunchpail is a living lunchpail who is a populist political commentator.
- Judy Goodstuff (performed by Victor Yerrid) – Judy Goodstuff is a sheep who is a newsbuster.
- L.R. Doll (performed by Colleen Smith) – L.R. Doll is a doll who is an adorable child's toy, a 2014 Scripts Toy Spelling bee champion, and the youngest member of Mensa International. She is a recycled version of Raisin from Secret Life of Toys.
- Laura Spots (performed by Donna Kimball) – Laura Spots is a jaguar who is a legal expert. She is a recycled version of Jasper the Jaguar from Jim Henson's Animal Show.
- Marlon (performed by Victor Yerrid) – Marlon is a salmon who is a contributor to a socialist blog called "The Dissident." Marlon can't stay out of water for long and would suffocate if he is not given water to survive. He is a recycled version of Yorick the Salmon from Jim Henson's Animal Show.
- Matt Rosenberg (performed by Bruce Lanoil) – Matt Rosenberg is a boy who is one of the youngest billionaires and the creator of the "iPhart" App. He is a recycled version of the boy Whatnot puppet that was previously used for Annie DeLoo from The Wubbulous World of Dr. Seuss and Billy from Statler and Waldorf: From the Balcony.
- Ned Cooper (performed by Drew Massey) – Ned Cooper is a grouper and science edutatiner who is nicknamed "The Science Grouper."
- Oliver Pouch (performed by Michael Oosterom) – Oliver Pouch is an opossum congressman who is the Representative of Texas and has a tendency to play dead. He is a recycled version of Ernie the Mongoose from Jim Henson's Animal Show.
- P.W. Butz (performed by Ted Michaels) – P.W. Butz is a shrew who is a billionaire and an investor. He is a recycled version of Priscilla the Honey possum from Jim Henson's Animal Show.
- Poppy McIntosh (performed by Peggy Etra) – Poppy McIntosh is a flower who is an environmental activist. She is a recycled version of one of the flowers from The Muppet Show.
- Princess (performed by Colleen Smith) – Princess is a poodle who is a celebutante and the unwitting star of the sex tapes called "A Late Afternoon in Princess" and "An Early Afternoon in Princess." She is a recycled version of Cashmere Ramada from Late Night Liars, who was also performed by Colleen Smith.
- Professor Cornelius Nougat (performed by Ted Michaels) – Professor Cornelius Nougat is a monkey who is a world-renowned "chimpthropologist." He is a recycled version of the monkey puppet used for Spank from Late Night Buffet with Augie and Del and Yeager from Simian Undercover Detective Squad.
- Professor L. Chupacabra (performed by Tyler Bunch) – Professor L. Chupacabra is a chupacabra who is a Chicano Studies Expert at UC Santa Cruz.
- Red Crab (performed by Colleen Smith) – A red crab who is the republican co-host of "Crab Fire." In "Shut Up 2013," it is revealed that the Red Crab is married to the Blue Democrat Crab. He is a recycled version of the red crab from Puppet Up!.
- Rob Ford (performed by Drew Massey) – Rob Ford is the beaver version of the actual Rob Ford who is the Mayor of Toronto. He is a recycled version of the beaver puppet that was used for Morton the Beaver from Jim Henson's Animal Show and Jacques the Beaver from Bear in the Big Blue House.
- Senator George Galapagos (performed by Paul Rugg in episode 1, 29 and 31, Allan Trautman in episode 9 and 12, Michael Oosterom in episode 42 and 47) – Senator George Galapagos is a bespectacled tortoise who is a 22 term senator from North Carolina. He is a recycled version of the tortoise puppet that was used for Penelope the Yellow-footed tortoise from Jim Henson's Animal Show and Jeremiah Tortoise from Bear in the Big Blue House.
- Shelly Spanks (performed by Julianne Buescher) – Shelly Spanks is a blue crab who is a controversial pundit and a columnist for The Guardian. She owns a blog called "Claw and Order."
- Silent Banana – Silent Banana is a banana with no mouth.
- Slim Beaumont (performed by Tyler Bunch) – Slim Beaumont is a cockroach who is a lawyer from Louisiana. He is a recycled version of a termite on Billy Bunny's Animal Songs.
- Snazz (performed by Colleen Smith) – Snazz is a blue creature who is a musician.
- Steeewwww (performed by Ted Michaels) – Steeewwww is a rabbit who is the co-host of a radio show called "The Hare and the Dog" on the radio station 102.5 "The Bone" in Tampa, Florida. He is a recycled version of a Bad Bunny from Puppet Up!.
- Star Schlessinger (performed by Colleen Smith) – Star Schlessinger is a red squirrel who is a columnist, a Christian conservative, and the host of the podcast "CROSSTalk" and "Judged." She is a recycled version of the squirrel puppet that was used for Gabe the Squirrel from Telling Stories with Tomie dePaola and Skippy the Squirrel from Bear in the Big Blue House.
- Supreme Leader Meow (performed by Colleen Smith) – Supreme Leader Meow is a cat who is the deposed and exiled dictator of Mattaqua.
- The Constitution (performed by Tyler Bunch in the first appearance, Michael Oosterom in the second appearance) – The Constitution is a bespectacled living constitution.
- Tiberius Coon III (performed by Victor Yerrid) – Tiberius Coon III is an eccentric billionaire raccoon from Australia and CEO of Coon Enterprises who is also a self-proclaimed "skillionaire."
- Tim Crotchety (performed by Artie Esposito) – Tim Crotchety is an old man who is a local radio personality and the secretary of Elk's Lodge #705 in Aurora, Illinois. He is a recycled version of the old man puppet from Puppet Up! that was also used for Steve in the podcasts for The Jim Henson Company's lot and Marvin E. Quasniki.
- Wally Nevada (performed by Drew Massey) – Wally Nevada is a beaver who is a hydroelectric mogul, a self-help guru, an expert dam builder, and the Mayor of Toronto. He is a recycled version of the beaver puppet that was used for Morton the Beaver from Jim Henson's Animal Show and Jacques the Beaver from Bear in the Big Blue House.
- Yerd Nerp (performed by Drew Massey) – Yerd Nerp is a one-eyed alien from an unnamed planet who is a political activist, an Immigration reformer, and the author of "Zeep Zop Zoop: My American Story." In "Shut Up 2013," it was revealed that Yerd Nerp had known Flerd Glerp when they used to work as a comedy duo before their planet went into a civil war. He is a recycled version of one of the Koozebanians from CityKids.

== Episodes ==
=== Season One ===
1. Immigration (November 1, 2013) – Paul F. Tompkins discusses immigration with Shelly Spanks, Senator George Galapagos, Hot Dog, and Yerd Nerp.
2. Gay Marriage (November 8, 2013) – Paul F. Tompkins discusses gay marriage with Matt Rosenberg, Billy Cabrito, "Grunt," and Bierstin Krakov.
3. Global Warming (November 15, 2013) – Paul F. Tompkins discusses global warming with Dr. Phillip Weasel, Tim Crotchety, Cheetah Grrrl, and Frankie Lemay.
4. Republican Party (November 28, 2013) – Paul F. Tompkins discusses the republican party with Marlon, Star Schlessinger, Steeewwww, and Yerd Nerp.
5. Evolution (December 6, 2013) – Paul F. Tompkins discusses evolution with Star Schlessinger, Professor Cornelius Nougat, Wally Nevada, and Hot Dog.
6. Nuclear Iran (December 13, 2013) – Paul F. Tompkins discusses Nuclear Iran with Marlon, Steeewwww, Princess, and Wally Nevada.
7. War on Christmas (December 20, 2013) – Paul F. Tompkins discusses the War on Christmas with Professor Cornelius Nougat, Hot Dog, Princess, and Yerd Nerp.
8. Shut Up 2013 (December 23, 2013) – Paul F. Tompkins, Billy Cabrito, Yerd Nerp, Star Schlessinger, Hot Dog, and Jeff Marks (who was the mid-episode replacement after Billy attacked Yerd Nerp) reflect on news, politics, entertainment, and civil discourse in 2013.
9. Shut Up, America (January 28, 2014) – Paul F. Tompkins discusses Barack Obama's 2014 State of the Union with Professor Cornelius Nougat, Star Schlessinger, Yerd Nerp, and Hot Dog.

=== Season Two ===
1. 2014 Winter Olympics (February 18, 2014) – Paul F. Tompkins discusses the 2014 Winter Olympics with Steeewwww, Andy Al-Jizah, Star Schlessinger, and Gulag.
2. 2014 Oscars (February 24, 2014) – Paul F. Tompkins discusses the 2014 Oscars with Jeff Marks, Princess, Armond Mite, and Chambray.
3. Child Obesity (March 3, 2014) – Paul F. Tompkins discusses child obesity with Senator George Galapagos, L.R. Doll, Professor Cornelius Nougat, and Hot Dog.
4. The Decline of America (March 10, 2014) – Paul F. Tompkins discusses the Decline in America with G. Gerald Mitty, George Rooney, Poppy McIntosh, and Haardvark.
5. Pipeline to Disaster (March 17, 2014) – Paul F. Tompkins discusses the Pipeline to Disaster with Steeewwww, Red Crab, Yerd Nerp, and Oliver Pouch.
6. Gentrification (March 24, 2014) – Paul F. Tompkins discusses Gentrification with Star Schlessinger, Joe Lunchpail, Armond Mite, and Professor Cornelius Nougat. In "Speaking Frankly," Hot Dog talks to Diego Luna about his upcoming film Cesar Chavez.
7. Guns (April 14, 2014) – Paul F. Tompkins discusses guns with Yerd Nerp, Oliver Pouch, The Constitution, and Haardvark.
8. Marijuana (April 21, 2014) – Paul F. Tompkins discusses Marijuana with Dr. Mooz, Hot Dog, Laura Spots, and Doug Benson.
9. Capital Punishment (April 28, 2014) – Paul F. Tompkins discusses capital punishment with Bierstin Krakov, Armond Mite, Yerd Nerp, and Professor L. Chupacabra.
10. Overpopulation (May 5, 2014) – Paul F. Tompkins discusses overpopulation with Hot Dog, Joe Lunchpail, Slim Beaumont, and Dr. Mooz. Paul also interviews Gary and Barry about their relationship.
11. Free Speech (May 12, 2014) – Paul F. Tompkins discusses Free Speech with Aunt Mildred, The Constitution, Gordon LeClair, and Bigfoot.
12. Price of Politics (May 19, 2014) – Paul F. Tompkins discusses the Price of Politics with Yerd Nerp, P.W. Butz, Oliver Pouch, and "A Bird." Joe Lunchpail does an editorial on the attacks on American foods.
13. Climate Catastrophe (June 2, 2014) – Paul F. Tompkins discusses Climate Catastrophe with Armond Mite, Star Schlessinger, Hot Dog, and Patton Oswalt.
14. Killer Viruses (June 9, 2014) – Paul F. Tompkins discusses Killer Viruses with Dr. Mooz, Steeewwww, Princess, and Thomas Lennon. Paul F. Tompkins also interviews Oliver Pouch about his reelection.
15. Worldwide Weight (June 16, 2014) – Paul F. Tompkins discusses Worldwide Weight with Princess, Dax Rhesus, Bigfoot, and Jeff Marks. In "Speaking Frankly," Hot Dog talks to Seth Green about his voice work in Family Guy and about Season 7 of Robot Chicken.
16. Hashtag Activism (June 23, 2014) – Paul F. Tompkins discusses Hashtag Activism with Star Schlessinger, Armond Mite, "A Bird," and David Koechner. Gulag talks about the 2014 FIFA World Cup in Brazil.
17. The American Dream (June 30, 2014) – Paul F. Tompkins discusses the American Dream with The Constitution, Red Crab, Yerd Nerp, and Nat Faxon. Paul F. Tompkins also interviews Joe Lunchpail about his life.
18. Gender Equality (July 7, 2014) – Paul F. Tompkins discusses Gender Equality with Rob Ford, Aunt Mildred, G. Gerald Mitty, and Nicole Sullivan.
19. Church and State (July 14, 2014) – Paul F. Tompkins discusses Church and State with Professor Cornelius Nougat, George Rooney, Star Schlessinger, and Maria Bamford. Paul also interviews Gary about his marriage equality when Barry has been seeing other people.
20. Killer Robots (July 21, 2014) – Paul F. Tompkins discusses Killer Robots with Ned Cooper, Princess, Senator George Galapagos, and Andy Richter. In "Judged," Star Schlessinger interviews Alan Tudyk.

=== Season three ===
1. I'm Taylor Swift (December 11, 2014) – Paul F. Tompkins discusses the Ebola Virus outbreak with Star Schlessinger. Paul then reflects on ISIS with Oliver Pouch on "Suck on That, ISIS." Hot Dog investigates the current uses of payphones on "NYSU Investigates." Joe Lunchpail talks about Iceland's plans to ban pornography. Paul and Hot Dog interview Troy Baker about his voice work. Paul interviews Rhys Darby about Short Poppies. Paul then talks to Oliver Pouch, Blue Crab, Star Schlessinger, and Rhys Darby about the War on Football.
2. I Like Pizza (December 18, 2014) – Paul F. Tompkins discusses Nuclear Meltdown with Bo Beetle. Bigfoot talks about his opinion in the 2016 Presidential Election. Senator George Galapagos talks about the uproar revolving around Black Peter in the Netherlands. "A Bird" asks people on the streets about the Legal System. In "Small Story, Big Picture," Paul talks about a dead porpoise being found on the beach and was used in a prank. Ron Funches reads a letter from his past self as part of an experiment. Paul then talks to Bo Beetle, Princess, Senator George Galapagos, and Ron Funches about the Russia Gate as Gulag reports about the explosion in Russia.
3. Year End 2014 Special (December 25, 2014) – As 2014 is almost over, Paul F. Tompkins discusses the Marriage Equality Movement with Barry and Gary. Dr. Mooz talks about the Health Issues of 2014. Paul holds a memorium for the words that are no longer used in 2014. Hot Dog talks about the 2014 Ferguson unrest incident as Paul Scheer of "Hush Now, Hush Now" crashes the program with Hot Link which results in Paul F. Tompkins beating Paul Scheer in a mental battle. Paul then talks to Star Schlessinger, Yed Nerp, Armond Mite, and Hot Dog about 2014 Winners and the 2014 Losers. Paul opens a gift from his Secret Santa with the gift being a Watson Tennis Racket with the Secret Santa being from the cast of "Hush Now, Hush Now."
4. Four Loko (January 1, 2015) – Paul F. Tompkins talks about the New Year's Resolutions. Joe Lunchpail talks about old news on "News News." In "Get to the Point," Ned Cooper and Oliver Pouch talk about bringing back long-extinct species like woolly mammoths, dodos, and passenger pigeons where Ned is not given enough time to get to his point. Haardvark raps about the recent legalizations of marijuana in 25 states. Hot Dog tries to find a protest to report about in Los Angeles. Paul talks about the protests with Joe Lunchpail, Oliver Pouch, Haardvark, and Brian Posehn.
5. The One with the Brussel Sprouts (January 8, 2015) – Paul F. Tompkins discusses the Great Pacific Garbage Patch with Bigfoot who is live at the location. Paul interviews "Weird Al" Yankovic where his hot dog publicist Judy is present and "Weird Al" accidentally hits Doug the Bat with a stick when he tries to ask a question. Paul and Professor Cornelius Nougat talk about Space tourism. Armond Mite talks about the trailers to The Second Best Exotic Marigold Hotel, Paul Blart: Mall Cop 2, and Star Wars: The Force Awakens. Paul discusses the Space Race with Ned Cooper, Star Schlessinger, Oliver Pouch, and Andy Kindler.
6. Wait, What?! (January 15, 2015) – Paul F. Tompkins discusses the European Problems with George Rooney. Al Madrigal talks about his upcoming Fusion special "Half Like Me" while showing a clip of their project "Wait, What?!" with Hot Dog and Lady Wiener and later reads a letter from his past self. Chimp with a Limp talks about how his toyline was discontinued and the recent technological projects. Paul, George Rooney, Joe Lunchpail, Bigfoot, and Jonah Ray discusses the ideas about the next President of the United States.
7. Life Hacks (January 29, 2015) – As part of the upcoming Award Season, Armond Mite hosts his award show "The Mites." Andy Daly talks about his show Review and about the Life Hacks. On "Bo Knows," Bo Beetle talks about Don Lemon's on-air gaffes. On "Mooz on the Move, Street MD," Dr. Mooz talks to people on the street about their personal diseases. Paul, Bo Beetle, Steeewwww, Star Schlessinger, and Andy Daly talk about America's Christian Uncoupling.
8. It's Just Stupid (February 5, 2015) – Paul F. Tompkins gets an accidental transmission from Bob Odenkirk while announcing that Jeb Bush is getting involved in the 2016 Presidential Election. In "Slippery Slope," Joe Lunchpail talks about the artificial intelligence that Stephen Hawking and Elon Musk are supporting. Tim Meadows and Paul show off their different segments that involves Hot Dog, Lady Weiner, and Joe Lunchpail. In "A Bunch of Talking Boxes," Paul, Oliver Pouch, Laura Spots, Ned Cooper, Dwayne Johnson, Brigham Brigham, and Silent Banana are about to talk about the Keystone Pipeline with Speaker of the House John Boehner until Bob Odenkirk's accidental transmission interferes making the discussion not happen. Hot Dog hits the streets to talk about the man buns hair style. Paul, Joe Lunchpail, Oliver Pouch, Hot Dog, and Cameron Esposito talk about Barack Obama's legacy. Bob Odenkirk's latest transmission leads to a discussion on what smoke detectors sound like when they are low on battery.
9. #Drums (February 12, 2015) – Paul F. Tompkins talks about the measles outbreak with Chimp with a Limp. Rich Sommer talks about the final season of Mad Men and improvises the different recent stories with "Doggiestyles with a Z" (which Hot Dog, Lady Weiner, Hot Link, and an unnamed hot dog are members of). Felicia Day talks about her autobiography as she and Paul follow Twitter suggestions which Bigfoot and Ned Cooper get involved in. Paul, Star Schlessinger, Bigfoot, The Constitution, and Rich Sommer discuss the Death of Privacy.
10. Stage Moms (February 19, 2015) – Paul F. Tompkins shows the stage mom of the fake baby with him and then discusses Chris Christie being under fire with Oliver Pouch. Paul and Ned Cooper collect money for the Tom Petty Cash Drive. Keegan-Michael Key and Jordan Peele talk about their comedy life with Bigfoot helping Paul give Keegan the prizes for being the 100th guest on the show and partaking in "Opposites: Attack" with Bo Beetle and Star Schlessinger also taking part in it. Paul, Yerd Nerp, Armond Mite, Bo Beetle, and Greg Proops discuss the American Sniper controversy.
11. Ski Lodge High (February 26, 2015) – Paul F. Tompkins discusses the Yoga Pants Ban with The Constitution. Scott Aukerman talks about Comedy Bang! Bang! where he also reminisces about the 90s and re-enacts moments from the TV show Ski Lodge High with Paul, Steeewwww (who portrayed the character Desert Storm Larry), Lady Weiner, Princess, Mark McGrath, and Dennis Haskins (who doesn't believe that Ski Lodge High is a real show). Hot Dog interviews Dan Harris about his work on TV journalism. Paul, Dr. Mooz, Red Crab, Hot Dog, and Scott Aukerman discuss the anti-vaccination movement.
12. Pistachio (March 5, 2015) – Paul F. Tompkins discusses about Tax Day as he burns his tax bills in the trash can. In "Cram," Paul discusses brief info with Professor Cornelius Nougat, Star Schlessinger, and George Rooney. Fred Willard talks about the latest trends. Bryan Fuller talks about Season 3 of Hannibal and answers questions from Bigfoot that revolve around Bigfoot's latest show. Paul, Star Schlessinger, George Rooney, Gary and Barry, and Fred Willard discuss social media.
13. Dynomite (March 12, 2015) – Paul F. Tompkins discusses the defeat of the 24 Hour Bar Bill with Senator George Galapagos who started dating Lady Weiner. Ben Schwartz talks about Season 3 of House of Lies with Red Crab, Haardvark, and Paul rating Ben's impersonations. Chris Parnell talks about his web series "Star Talking." Paul, Blue Crab, Red Crab, The Constitution, and Chris Parnell discuss American Exceptionalism.
14. On Fleek (March 19, 2015) – Paul F. Tompkins discusses human evolution with Dwayne Johnson upon finding proof of human evolution in the past. Chris Gethard talks about his show called The Chris Gethard Show which will air on Fusion and goes through the initiation that involves Chris being roasted by Armond Mite, Wade the Bat, Hot Dog, Chris repeating after "A Bird," and having to compete against Mike to keep their hand on Dwayne Johnson. In "Bo v. Wade," Bo Beetle and Wade the Bat compete about different current topics. Lauren Lapkus and Hot Dog review the latest apps on "Lauren Lapkus' App Kisses." Paul, Armond Mite, Hot Dog, Supreme Leader Meow, and Lauren Lapkus talk about the recent happenings to the world.
15. Stupid Man (March 26, 2015) – In "Hot Top Picks," Paul F. Tompkins, Ned Cooper, Oliver Pouch, and Star Schlessinger talk about the different topics of this week. Tim Heidecker talks about On Cinema and his "Working Work Out" exercises where one of them has him doing arm wrestling with Bigfoot as Joe Lunchpail and Oliver Pouch watch. Thomas Middleditch talks about Silicon Valley as he and Paul take off-topic phone questions from people. Paul, Haardvark, Dr. Mooz, Joe Lunchpail, and Thomas Middleditch talk about the Politics of Food.
16. Horses (April 2, 2015) – In "The Cram," Paul F. Tompkins, Red Crab, The Constitution, and "A Bird" talk about the latest news. Matt Walsh talks about his role on Veep and takes part in "The News Wheel." Patrick Warburton shows Paul his food reviewing videos with video responses from Hot Dog. Paul, Star Schlessinger, George Rooney, Ned Cooper, and Matt Walsh talk about China overthrowing North America as a leading superpower.
17. Jiggle the Handle (April 9, 2015) – In "Get to the Point," Paul F. Tompkins, Alicia Menendez, and Star Schlessinger talk about Ted Cruz's election and the final season of Downton Abbey. Joe Lo Truglio makes his way through the NYSU door (which had to be unlocked by Bigfoot) to talk about Brooklyn Nine-Nine, shows off his golf skills, and gives Paul cooking advice with Hot Dog's help. In "Three to Five Viral Questions," Paul and Tig Notaro answer viral questions. Paul, Red Crab, Armond Mite, Judy Goodstuff, and Tig Notaro talk about the shortage of the world's water.
18. Sheet Cakes (April 16, 2015) – In "Star's Wars," Star Schlessinger and Barry debate about the banning of gay people at a pizza restaurant. Wendi McLendon-Covey talks about Repeat After Me through her service person Darryl. Pete Holmes gives Paul F. Tompkins a plant as a gift and does a sheet cake-themed podcast talking about the latest episodes of Castle. Paul, Hot Dog, Senator George Galapagos, Dwayne Johnson, and Pete Holmes talk about the sharing economy. Kate Micucci and Riki Lindhome cover for Paul when he has to leave take part in a basketball game.
19. Ice Cream (April 23, 2015) – Paul F. Tompkins and Tiberius Coon III talk about "Project: Tiberian X" which is a time-travel experiment being developed by Coon Enterprises. Judy Greer talks about her role in Jurassic World and how she encounter Bigfoot in Paul's dressing room as well as experiencing strange clips occur during the interview. In "Speaking Frankly," Hot Dog interviews John Cho. Paul, Professor Cornelius Nougat, Senator George Galapagos, Tiberius Coon III, and Steve Agee talk about the one percent.
20. Mandy Patinkin (April 30, 2015) – Paul F. Tompkins looks back on Season Three as part of the season finale. In "Hot Top Pick," Paul, Bierstin Krakov, and the Constitution talk about the featured hot topics. While providing the music, Jack Black competes against Paul in the brisk walking race with Jack losing to deal with Hot Dog's choking problem. Danny Pudi gets his face painted to look like Spider-Man and gets interviewed by Hot Dog about Community. Armond Mite, Chimp with a Limp, Snazz, and Danny Pudi talk about the rising cost of college and then roasts Mandy Patinkin with Jack Black's help. Paul, Jack Black, Hot Dog, Snazz, and Armond Mite sing their rendition of the "No, You Shut Up!" theme song.
21. Special Report #1 (November 5, 2015) – Paul F. Tompkins talks about his two specials before Season 4 debuts on February 4, 2016 while counting down to the 2016 Presidential Election. In "Shut Up the Vote 2015," Paul, Star Schlessinger, Armond Mite, and Bigfoot talk about the broken debates. In "Make Sense," Dan Abrams talks via satellite about the issues with fantasy game gambling websites. Kristen Schaal talks about her views of the 2016 Presidential Election and takes part in "Wait, What?!" with Paul, Hot Dog, and Lady Weiner. Hannibal Buress talks about his special coming up on Netflix called Hannibal Buress: Comedy Camisado, his opinions on the political debates, and the effects of the 2015 El Niño. Paul, Star Schlessinger, Armond Mite, and Hot Dog talk about their "Wishues" (short for wish issues) as part of the 2016 Presidential Election.
22. Special Report #2 (November 12, 2015) – In the second special, Paul F. Tompkins does "Shut Up the Vote 2015" with Star Schlessinger, Barry, and Dwayne Johnson revolving around Ben Carson's presidential campaign. Patton Oswalt announces his candidacy for President and talks about what he'll do when he becomes President while answering questions from Barry, Star Schlessinger, and Dwayne Johnson. Hot Dog talks about his trip to Politi-Con while showing footage of his interview with Ted Lieu. Paul gets a call from Donald Trump only to learn that he is talking to archive recordings of him. The "NYSU Vault" is opened during "No, You Look Back" so that they can look back to an older episode that aired on September 26, 1960 where the unnamed 1960s host, Mr. Carruthers, Mrs. Bramblecorn, and a faceless hot dog named Mr. Frankfurter discuss the First Kennedy-Nixon debate. Paul, Star Schlessinger, Dwayne Johnson, and Hot Dog talk about who to say shut up to in 2016.

=== Season Four ===
1. Sconces (February 4, 2016) – In the Season Four premiere, Paul F. Tompkins talks about the election covering. In "Shut Up the Votes" Paul, Armond Mite, Hot Dog, and Star Schlessinger talk about their political analysis on the election caucus. Cenk Uygur talks about his show The Young Turks while taking part in the "Terminal Verdict" where they take parts about Sarah Palin's support of Donald Trump, the sconces that Paul and his wife prefer, and Hot Dog's question about Super Bowl 50. Colin Hanks talks about his show Life in Pieces and does kinder-splaining with Miss Pancakes about dangerous topics. Paul, Star Schlessinger, Armond Mite, Hot Dog, and Colin Hanks talk about gun regulations.
2. Oui Oui (February 11, 2016) - In "Shut Up the Vote," Paul F. Tompkins talks about the recent election coverage involving Bernie Sanders and Hillary Clinton with Oliver Pouch and Dwayne Johnson. Bassem Youssef talks about his Fusion show "Democracy Handbook" while also appearing on Star Schlessinger's segment "Judged." Adam Conover talks about Adam Ruins Everything and grabs a 3-D Internet Question Randomizer where he gets stuck in there. Paul, Oliver Pouch, Barry and Gary, Dwayne Johnson, and Adam Conover (who is still stuck in the 3-D Internet Question Randomizer) about the true crime documentaries and criminal justice reserve. Adam Conover finally gets out of the box when it turns out that it has to be pushed open as he tries to get Paul and the others to eat his poop potatoes.
3. Bernie Bros. (February 18, 2016) - In "Shut Up the Vote," Paul F. Tompkins talks about the death and legacy of Antonin Scalia with Oliver Pouch and Yerd Nerp. Jen Kirkman talks about her latest book and goes to the "Bernie Bro Zone" hosted by Hot Dog. Anonymous interrupts the show to give Paul top secret information that would disrupt Donald Trump's election which Paul already knows. Bobak Ferdowski talks about his job at NASA and takes part in "Explain It Like I'm a Big Dumb Bird" to tell "A Bird" about future colonization of Mars. Anonymous interrupts again with another set of attempts to obtain dark secrets of Donald Trump. Paul, Yerd Nerp, Star Schlessinger, and Hot Dog talk about undocumented immigration. Anonymous interrupts a final time by doing insulting jokes towards Donald Trump's campaign which Hot Dog finds hilarious.
4. Basketball (February 25, 2016) - In "Shut Up the Vote," Paul, Ned Cooper, Oliver Pouch, and The Constitution talk about the election information. Bobby Moynihan voices his opinions of the 2016 election while showing his voter apathy videos with Hot Dog. Joel Stein talks about his encounter with Bernie Sanders as Judy Goodstuff talks about her interview with him. River Butcher talks about the construction of the City of Champions Stadium. Paul, Ned Cooper, Oliver Pouch, and Judy Goodstuff talk about cheap gas and clean energies.
5. Half Mexican (March 3, 2016) - Hot Dog, Armond Mite, and Dwayne Johnson use the Random Guest Hosting Diversity Wheel to select the substitute host when Paul F. Tompkins doesn't show up. The Guest Host Wheel lands on Half Mexican as Al Madrigal shows up and watches an instructional guest hosting videos left by Paul. In "Shut Up the Vote," Ned Cooper, Star Schlessinger, and Armond Mite talk about Donald Trump and Hillary Clinton being the technical winners. Kurt Braunohler takes part in the "Letter to Our Future President" segment with Lady Weiner. Hot Dog talks about his visit to the red carpet of the 88th Academy Awards where he interacts with Patricia Heaton, Adam McKay, George Miller, Sacha Baron Cohen, Isla Fisher, Pete Docter, Will Poulter, and Whoopi Goldberg. Axel Caballero tells Al and Yerd Nerp about NALIP (short for National Association of Latino Independent Producers). Al, Oliver Pouch, Barry and Gary, and Dwayne Johnson talk about Apple Inc.'s appealing of the FBI's court order to unlock San Bernandino's iPhone, who should choose the successor of Antonin Scalia, and the Brazilian authorities having to deal with a monkey in a bar.
6. Reza Aslan/Mary Lynn Rajskub (March 10, 2016) - In "Shut Up the Vote," Armond Mite, Yerd Nerp, and Star Schlessinger talk about Super Tuesday's debate. Reza Aslan talks about Of Kings and Prophets and takes part in the game "Trumptionary" with help from The Constitution. Mary Lynn Rajskub wears the Quizzle 8000 where she is matched with her idea candidate with help from Ned Cooper and Bigfoot. In "Speak Frankly," Hot Dog talks with Tony Hale about different things. Paul holds a moment of silence for those who lost the election followed by their mannequins getting sliced by Cold Steel's swords. Paul, Star Schlessinger, Yerd Nerp, and Armond Mite talk about the single girl power, the possible closing of Guantánamo Bay, and the rise of the robots.
7. Thomas Lennon/John Hodgman (March 17, 2016) - Paul F. Tompkins does a "Trump Watch" to see which hallway Donald Trump will come down. In "Shut Up the Vote," Paul, Armond Mite, and Star Schlessinger talk John Kasich's victory as Marco Rubio's mannequin gets sliced by Cold Steel. Thomas Lennon talks about the upcoming season of The Odd Couple and his scripting for Donald Trump. John Hodgman talks about his slogan if he ran for President and talks about the penis research with Lady Weiner and Bigfoot. Paul, Star Schlessinger, Oliver Pouch, and Hot Dog talk about Donald Trump's possible danger to the GOP and the naturalization of immigrants. On "NYSU! On the Street," Brianna Baker asks the African-Americans in Los Angeles on what they think of Donald Trump. As Paul continues his "Trump Watch" while everybody sleeps, he tells everyone that new episodes will resume on June 9, 2016.

== Cast ==
- Paul F. Tompkins – Himself

=== Special guest stars ===
- Dan Abrams - Himself
- Steve Agee – Himself
- Reza Aslan - Himself
- Scott Aukerman – Himself
- Brianna Baker - Herself
- Troy Baker – Himself
- Maria Bamford – Herself
- Doug Benson – Himself
- Jack Black – Himself
- Kurt Braunohler - Himself
- Hannibal Buress - Himself
- River Butcher - Themself
- Axel Caballero - Himself
- John Cho – Himself
- Adam Conover - Himself
- Andy Daly – Himself
- Rhys Darby – Himself
- Felicia Day – Herself
- Cameron Esposito – Herself
- Nat Faxon – Himself
- Bobak Ferdowski - Himself
- Bryan Fuller – Himself
- Ron Funches – Himself
- Chris Gethard – Himself
- Seth Green – Himself
- Judy Greer – Herself
- Tony Hale - Himself
- Colin Hanks - Himself
- Dan Harris – Himself
- Dennis Haskins – Himself
- Tim Heidecker – Himself
- John Hodgman - Himself
- Pete Holmes – Himself
- Keegan-Michael Key – Himself
- Andy Kindler – Himself
- Jen Kirkman - Herself
- David Koechner – Himself
- Lauren Lapkus – Herself
- Thomas Lennon – Himself
- Riki Lindhome – Herself
- Diego Luna – Himself
- Al Madrigal – Himself
- Mark McGrath – Himself
- Wendi McLendon-Covey – Herself
- Tim Meadows – Himself
- Alicia Menendez – Herself
- Kate Micucci – Herself
- Thomas Middleditch – Himself
- Bobby Moynihan - Himself
- Tig Notaro – Herself
- Bob Odenkirk – Himself
- Patton Oswalt – Himself
- Chris Parnell – Himself
- Jordan Peele – Himself
- Brian Posehn – Himself
- Greg Proops – Himself
- Danny Pudi – Himself
- Mary Lynn Rajskub - Himself
- Jonah Ray – Himself
- Andy Richter – Himself
- Kristen Schaal - Herself
- Paul Scheer – Himself
- Ben Schwartz – Himself
- Rich Sommer – Himself
- Joel Stein - Himself
- Nicole Sullivan – Herself
- Joe Lo Truglio – Himself
- Alan Tudyk – Himself
- Cenk Uygur - Himself
- Matt Walsh – Himself
- Patrick Warburton – Himself
- Fred Willard – Himself
- "Weird Al" Yankovic – Himself
- Bassem Youssef - Himself

=== Puppeteers ===
- Julianne Buescher – Shelly Spanks
- Tyler Bunch – Professor L. Chupacabra, Slim Beaumont, The Constitution (1st Time)
- Brian Clark – Andy Al-Jizah, Jeff Marks
- Artie Esposito – Tim Crotchety
- Peggy Etra – Poppy McIntosh
- Donna Kimball – Cheetah Grrrl, "Grunt," Laura Spots
- Bruce Lanoil – Matt Rosenberg
- Drew Massey – Gary, Gordon LeClair, Hot Link (ep. 32, 38), Joe Lunchpail, Ned Cooper, Rob Ford, Wally Nevada, Yerd Nerp
- Ted Michaels – Chambray, Dwayne Johnson, G. Gerald Mitty, Lady Wiener (ep. 35, 37, 38, 40, 42, 50), Mr. Frankfurter (ep. 51), P.W. Butz, Professor Cornelius Nougat, Steeewwww, Wade the Bat (ep. 43)
- Michael Oosterom – Armond Mite, Dax Rhesus, Doug the Bat (ep. 34), Dr. Mooz, George Rooney, Gulag, Oliver Pouch, Senator George Galapagos (ep. 42, 47, 48), The Constitution (2nd Time)
- Paul Rugg – Senator George Galapagos (ep. 1, 29, 31)
- Colleen Smith – Aunt Mildred, Judy the Hot Dog (ep. 34), L.R. Doll, Mrs. Bramblecorn (ep. 51), Princess, Red Crab, Snazz, Star Schlessinger, Supreme Leader Meow
- Allan Trautman – Billy Cabrito, Frankie Lemay, Senator George Galapagos (ep. 9, 12)
- Victor Yerrid – "A Bird," Barry, Bierstin Krakov, Bigfoot, Blue Crab, Bo Beetle, Chimp With a Limp, Dr. Phillip Weasel, Gulag (ep. 31), Haardvark, Hot Dog, Judy Goodstuff, Marlon, Miss Pancakes (ep. 52), Tiberius Coon III
