= Puppet Up! =

Adult live musical puppet show

- Company: The Jim Henson Company (2006-2007, 2019-present); Henson Alternative (2008-2019 (uncredited)); Center Theatre Group (2025)
- Genre: Improvisation; Puppetry
- Show type: Touring
- Date of premiere: March 8, 2006

Creative team
- Creator: Brian Henson (March 8, 2006 - July 18, 2025); Patrick Bristow
- Official website

Puppet Up! – Uncensored is an adult live puppet musical show produced by The Jim Henson Company combining puppetry and improvisational comedy created by Brian Henson and Groundlings performer Patrick Bristow. The show is advertised for "adults only" and as "uncensored". However, one rare and "exclusive" set of shows "for children" were held in Edinburgh in 2006.

The sketches in the live show are not pre-planned and the shows contain all true improv. The puppeteers in the Henson improv troupe trained with Patrick Bristow for nine months to perfect their improv skills prior to their first show. Just like the Groundlings, the Henson improv sketches are performed based on audience suggestions.

== History ==
=== Puppet Improv (March 2006) ===
Brian Henson, producer of the show, recalled the genesis of the show in a 2006 interview stating, "we began doing puppet improv workshops to hone our comedy skills and realized that we were having so much fun that audiences might enjoy watching too." In the fall of 2005 a show was performed in the sound stage of the Jim Henson Studios for friends and invited industry guests. The two shows were so successful that the group was invited to the 2006 HBO’s U.S. Comedy Arts Festival, where it made its public debut. Jim Henson's Puppet Improv was performed at two shows featuring Henson, Bill Barretta, Julianne Buescher, Leslie Carrara-Rudolph, Drew Massey, Paul Rugg, Allan Trautman and Victor Yerrid. Willie Etra was the musical director and operated the keyboards.

=== Puppet Up! (June–October 2006) ===
In June 2006, Jim Henson’s Puppet Improv began performing under a new name, Puppet Up! - Uncensored The troupe performed four shows over three nights at The Improv in Hollywood.

In August 2006 Puppet Up! traveled to the Edinburgh Fringe Festival for 30 shows. Two versions of the show were performed: the regular "adult only" version and, for the first and only time, a family-friendly "for kids" show.

=== Puppet Up! - Uncensored (November 2006 – November 2009) ===
Puppet Up! performed two shows at Caesars Palace in November 2006. These shows were filmed as part of HBO and AEG Live's The Comedy Festival. HBO and TBS produced a 1st and only hour-long television special from these shows that aired five days later on TBS. TBS also ordered 30 web-exclusive episodes of "Puppet Up!" for their "Laugh Lab" video service on TBS.com. The web series debuted on TBS.com and on YouTube on March 7, 2007, to onward.

"Puppet Up! Uncensored" performed at the Grove of Anaheim on March 4, 2007.

"Puppet Up! Uncensored" found a home at the historic Avalon theatre for several months out of the year between 2007 and 2009.

=== Stuffed and Unstrung (April 2010 – April 2013) ===
In April 2010, the show was brought to New York City under the title Stuffed and Unstrung, featuring all new technical effects and original music and staging.

"Stuffed and Unstrung" pays tribute to Jim Henson with re-creations of two of his most famous routines from "The Tonight Show" and some of the variety shows:

- "I've Grown Accustomed to Your Face" features a female puppet (which resembles the earlier version of Kermit the Frog) singing the classic song to another puppet (who resembles a rebuilt Yorick) who scarily changes features.
- "Java" depicts a violent brawl between two creatures trying to dance to the rollicking Al Hirt instrumental track.

Bobby Vegan and Sampson Knight from the pilot to Henson Alternative's Tinseltown appear as the fictional executive producers of "Stuffed and Unstrung." Bobby and Sampson appear in a pre-taped video introduction and segments for the show as well as being featured in the show's promotional material.

They performed 10 shows under the new name at the San Francisco Sketch Fest in August 2011.

=== Puppet Up! - Uncensored 2.0 (August 2013 – March 2022) ===
In August 1–26, 2013, they were invited back to the Edinburgh Fringe Festival and resumed their previous name, "Puppet Up! Uncensored"

"Puppet Up! Uncensored" toured Toronto, Canada in October 2013.

"Puppet Up! Uncensored" did a show at the Kirk Douglas Theatre in Culver City, CA in February 2014.

"Puppet Up! Uncensored" did a brief US Tour in March 2014 including UT, PA, IL, MI and WI before heading out internationally televised to do the Melbourne Comedy Festival in Australia at the end of the month.

"Puppet Up! Uncensored" performed at the Pasadena Playhouse in July 2014.

"Puppet Up! Uncensored" returned to San Francisco to perform several shows at the Marine Memorial Theatre in November 2014.

"Puppet Up! Uncensored" did a few more shows at the Kirk Douglas Theatre in Culver City, CA in 2015 and early 2016 before heading to Las Vegas, NV.

On July 21, 2016, Puppet Up! - Uncensored began performing monthly shows at Venetian Hotel & Casino in Las Vegas. It closed on September 17, 2016.

"Puppet Up! Uncensored" returned to its original home at the historic Jim Henson Company lot in Hollywood, to perform weekend shows and went on hiatus on 3/11/2017, 6/17/2017, 1/27/2018, 7/28/2018, 11/3/2017, 6/8/2019, 1/25/2020, 7/31/2021 and 3/4/2022.

On January 27, 2020, "Puppet Up!" became Celebrity Puppet Up! - Uncensored. "Celebrity Puppet Up!" is a game show that began performing at the Jim Henson Company Lot right after the Weekend shows.

The Worldwide Pandemic of the COVID-19 virus put the shows on a major hiatus after the January 2020 shows.

"Puppet Up! Uncensored" returned to do 4 shows on the weekend of July 31, 2021 at the historic Jim Henson Company lot in Hollywood, following all the CDC and LA County guidelines for live events, therefore requiring all guests to wear face masks to protect against the spread of the COVID-19 virus for the duration of each 90 minute show.

==== Halloween Horror Version ====
Puppet Up! - Uncensored performed at Knott's Scary Farm for the event's 2019 season, from September 20 to November 2.

"Puppet Up! Uncensored" returned to perform shows at Knott's Scary Farm for the event's 2021 season, from September 16 to October 31.

=== Puppet Up! - Uncensored 3.0 - 4.0 (August 12, 2022 – March 1, 2026) ===
"Puppet Up! Uncensored" returned and performed all the shows at the Jim Henson Company lot in Hollywood. These five performances also feature two new interpretations of classic sketches with an all-new early different variation of Kermit puppet originally created by Jim Henson displayed at the lot from February 20, 2023, to May 10, 2025, on another hiatus.

==== Halloween Horror Version ====
"Puppet Up! Uncensored" returned to perform shows at Knott's Scary Farm for the final event's 2022 season, from September 22 to October 31.

==== Summer Version ====
Puppet Up! - Uncensored was returned to do more shows and relocating again to Kirk Douglas Theater in Culver City, California, followed by a pre-show vip experience featuring characters from The Dark Crystal, Fraggle Rock, Labyrinth and more productions from the Jim Henson Company. Two versions of the show performed: the regular "adult only" version and, for the first time, another show "for ages 16 and up".

=== Puppet Up! Events and Exhibits (February 20 - March 1, 2026, July 31, 2026 -) ===
Brian Henson's Puppet Up! is a live show at the Montalban Theater featuring puppeteers and puppets blending improv comedy with Henson skill. It's provocative, unpredictable, and strictly for adults. Recommended for ages 16 and up; attendees under 16 will not be admitted. The show was premiered from February 20 - March 1, 2026.

On July 31, 2026, the show was returned for its original title with a special screening of Labyrinth. Also, Brian Henson will discuss the evolution of The Jim Henson Company’s innovative puppetry in a presentation filled with Henson history, humor, and of course puppets before going on east coast tour in September-October 2026.

This unique single event “A Conversation with Brian Henson” was held at the Montalban Theater in Hollywood, CA, on Sunday August 2, 2026, at 2:00PM and will be held at the BMCC Tribeca Performing Arts Center in New York, New York.

In Australia, the show was renamed and titled “Make, Believe, Magic” for Australian audiences as a traveling exhibit opened at Gallery of Modern Art, Brisbane in Queensland from September 12, 2026 to April 18, 2027. The exhibit featured of the display of different puppet characters from the franchises of Jim Henson Company, and it contained 12 puppet holder stand and a small screen below the 12 holder stand.

== Miskreant Puppets ==
Early on, the improv show featured many puppets recycled from past projects from The Jim Henson Company. As the show grew, new and original puppets were created that joined the show. In 2006, new Puppet Up! puppets were designed by Julianne Buescher and Drew Massey. The puppets were built by Julianne Buescher, Drew Massey, Patrick Johnson, and Sean Johnson with help and guidance from veteran Muppet designer/builder Jane Gootnick. These puppets have been labeled as the Miskreant Puppets.

The following puppets are shown in "Puppet Up" with most of them being recycled from other productions:

- Aardvark - This puppet was previously used for Arlene the Aardvark and Dullard the Aardvark from Jim Henson's Animal Show.
- Armadillo - This puppet was previously used for Dooley the Armadillo from Jim Henson's Animal Show, Annette the Armadillo from Bear in the Big Blue House, and Joe the Armadillo from Kermit's Swamp Years.
- Beaver - This puppet was previously used for Morton the Beaver from Jim Henson's Animal Show, Jacques the Beaver from Bear in the Big Blue House, and Winky the Beaver from the "Cindy Crawford" episode of Muppets Tonight.
- Bear - This puppet was previously used for Bunnie the Bear from Jim Henson's Animal Show and Max Bear in Episode 4193 of Sesame Street.
- Bongo the Monkey from Late Night Buffet with Augie and Del
- Captain from CityKids - His puppet was used for an unnamed creature.
- Cashmere Ramada from Late Night Liars - This puppet was occasionally reprised by Colleen Smith in specific "Puppet Up!" performances.
- Cool the Kangaroo Rat from Jim Henson's Animal Show - His puppet was dressed up by Julianne Buescher.
- Cornelius the Crab from Jim Henson's Animal Show
- DJ 1 the Panda from Animal Jam
- DJ 2 the Koala from Animal Jam
- DJ 3 the Leopard from Animal Jam
- Dread from CityKids - His puppet was often used for a Rastafarian character.
- Flitzpizzle from The Wubbulous World of Dr. Seuss - His puppet was redressed by Julianne Buescher with eyelids included on the puppet.
- The Flowers from The Muppet Show
- Frankie Frank and the Footers from CityKids
- Galahad the Grasshopper Mouse from Jim Henson's Animal Show
- The Goat from Telling Stories with Tomie dePaola
- Guffrey the Vulture from Jim Henson's Animal Show
- Joey the Monkey from Late Night Buffet with Augie and Del
- Koozbanians from CityKids - Their puppets were often used for the Horny Aliens.
- Lester Possum from Statler and Waldorf: From the Balcony - His puppet was used for various unnamed possum character.
- Libido from CityKids - His puppet in prototype form was used for an unnamed creature.
- Lieutenant from CityKids - His puppet was used for an unnamed creature.
- Orangutan - This puppet was previously used for Jackie the Orangutan and Lawrence the Orangutan from Jim Henson's Animal Show. The puppet was recycled as Professor Ape and was performed by Allan Trautman who often portrayed Professor Ape as a father figure telling bedtime stories to his sons or as an intellectual philosopher discussing deep and meaningful issues with other puppets. This puppet was redressed with glasses by Julianne Buescher.
- Pancake the Water Buffalo from Animal Jam
- Pokey from Muppets Tonight - Pokey's puppet is no longer featured in "Puppet Up!" upon The Walt Disney Company seizing it for its status as a "Muppet."
- A Pug from Dog City - This puppet was previously used as Pavlov the Pug from Jim Henson's Animal Show and was often used as Piddles the Pug who was often performed by Julianne Buescher. Jane Gootnik mended and redressed the puppet in a diaper and a dog tag made by Julianne for "Puppet Up" after finding its puppet in storage. Piddles was depicted as the dog of Mr. Guy who would often mistaken Piddles' gender.
- Raisin from Secret Life of Toys
- Spank the Monkey from Late Night Buffet with Augie and Del
- Squirrel - This puppet was previously used for Gabe the Squirrel from Telling Stories with Tomie dePaola and Skippy the Squirrel from Bear in the Big Blue House.
- Turtle - This puppet was previously used for Penelope the Yellow-Footed Tortoise from Jim Henson's Animal Show and Jeremiah Tortoise from Bear in the Big Blue House.
- Waffle the Cow-Monkey from Animal Jam - His puppet was often used as an unnamed monkey character minus the cowboy outfit.
- Warthog - This puppet was previously used for Bernice the Warthog and Warren the Warthog from Jim Henson's Animal Show.
- Whatnots - Various Whatnots were featured in this show. A boy Whatnot was previously used for Annie DeLoo from The Wubbulous World of Dr. Seuss and Billy from Statler and Waldorf: From the Balcony. A man Whatnot was previously used in The Wubbulous World of Dr. Seuss and used in various roles in this live show like a deadpan lesbian named Nancy. One female Whatnot was previously used in The Wubbulous World of Dr. Seuss and a green female Whatnot alongside a female curly-haired blue Whatnot and a red-haired Whatnot were previously used in The Muppet Show. Each of the Whatnots were refurbished and redressed by Julianne Buescher.
- Yorick the Salmon from Jim Henson's Animal Show - His puppet is used for an unnamed fish character.

The following were original puppets for "Puppet Up":

- Al the Alien - He is often performed by Brian Henson who considered Al his personal favorite. He was designed by Julianne Buescher and built by Patrick Johnson under the guidance of Jane Gootnik.
- Bad Bunnies - Their designs are based off Hopper the Rabbit from Muppets Tonight and George and Melissa Rabbit from Emmet Otter's Jug-Band Christmas.
- Blue Crab - A blue version of Cornelius the Crab from Jim Henson's Animal Show.
- Blue the Monster - A full-bodied puppet that is used for the lobby and VIP experiences during the show's performances at The Montalbán Theatre in Hollywood. He is performed by Andrew A. Cano.
- Boy #1 - This puppet was later used in Sisimpur.
- Boy #2 - This puppet was used in improv games with the puppet being operated by an audience member. This puppet was later used as Mortimer in a series of comical TwitPics sent from the Jim Henson Company's Twitter account in honor of April Fools' Day.
- Buck - A puppet similar to Mr. Guy who did the opening from 2013-2014.
- Cartwheeling Cheerleader -
- Cavemen - Two prehistoric men and one prehistoric woman who were created for "Puppet Up!"
- Claude Bigfoot - He was designed by Julianne Buescher and built by Julianne Buescher and Drew Massey.
- Dr. Scientist - He was designed and built by Drew Massey and often performed by Paul Rugg who considered Dr. Scientist his personal favorite.
- Duck Boy - He was designed and built by Julianne Buescher and often performed by Victor Yerrid.
- Frenchy - He was often performed by Paul Rugg in a French accent and considers him his personal favorite. Paul Rugg would often use Frenchy to act out a film director or a game show host.
- Germs - Germs 1 and 4 were designed and built by Drew Massey while Germs 2 and 3 were designed and built by Julianne Buescher.
- Girl - This puppet was used in improv games with the puppet being operated by an audience member.
- Herman Monster - He was designed by Julianne Buescher and built by Sean Johnson under the guidance of Jane Gootnik. His fur was the same as the fur of Sprocket the Dog from Fraggle Rock and Grover from Sesame Street.
- Leopard Girl -
- Monkey - This monkey was the prototype puppet for Lieutenant from the pilot of CityKids.
- Mr. Guy - He was designed by Drew Massey and performed by Brian Henson who would often use him in the openings of "Puppet Up" with his dog Piddles to tell the audience on how the show works. Mr. Guy's puppet was often used as a newscaster performed by Drew Massey and under names like Dick Hardschmedley or Hank Schmuckley.
- Nerd Boy - He was designed and built by Julianne Buescher.
- Nerd Girl - She was designed and built by Julianne Buescher.
- Old Man #1 - An original puppet designed by Drew Massey. This old man was called Harvey in the television special. This puppet was later used for Steve in the podcasts for The Jim Henson Company's lot and later used for Marvin E. Quasniki.
- Old Man #2 - An original puppet designed by Drew Massey.
- Old Woman - She was designed and built by Julianne Buescher.
- Pretty Girl - She was designed, built, and often performed by Julianne Buescher.
- Punk Guy - He was designed and built by Drew Massey.
- Red Crab - A red version of Cornelius the Crab from Jim Henson's Animal Show. He was designed by Eric Englehart and built by Sean Johnson.
- Punu the Tiki God - He is one of the largest puppets in the entire cast.
- Weasel #1 -
- Weasel #2 - This puppet was a favorite of Julianne Buescher.
- Whale -
- Yodita - He was built and designed by Julianne Buescher.

== Puppeteers ==
Alongside Bristow, Enriquez and Henson, among the puppeteers who have performed in Puppet Up! are:

The Jim Henson Company (2006–2025)	Kirk Douglas Theatre (2014, 2015, 2016, 2025)
Bill Barretta (March 8–12, 2006 (Colorado), April 22–23, 2010 (New York), August 18–27, 2011, November 14, 2014, November 8 & 15, 2024 (California))	Bill Barretta (July 16–18, 2025)
Dan Garza (October 2022 – present)	Dan Garza (July 16–18, 23–25, 2025)
Grant Baciocco (August 2007 – present)	Grant Baciocco (February 20, 2014, March 21–22, 2015, January 9, 2016, July 16–18, 26–27, 2025)
Kathryn Chinn Malloy (October 2022 – present)	Kathryn Chinn Malloy (July 16–18, 2025)
Peggy Etra (December 30, 2010 – present)	Peggy Etra (July 16–18, 26–27, 2025)
Stoph Scheer (October 2022 – present)	Stoph Scheer (July 16–18, 23–25, 2025)
Ted Michaels (June 2006 – present)	Ted Michaels (July 16–18, 26–27, 2025)

=== Notable replacements ===
- Allan Trautman
- Ben Schrader
- Brian Clark
- Colleen Smith
- John Tartaglia
- Michael Oosterom
- Raymond Carr
- Sarah Oh

=== Former ===
- Anthony Asbury
- Jennifer Barnhart
- Tim Blaney
- Julianne Buescher
- Tyler Bunch (June 2006 - September 2016)
- Kevin Carlson
- Leslie Carrara-Rudolph
- Marcus Clarke
- Melissa Creighton
- Stephanie D'Abruzzo
- Dorien Davies
- Alice Dinnean
- Genevieve Flati
- James Godwin
- Patrick Johnson
- Sean Johnson
- Brian Michael Jones
- Donna Kimball
- Karen Maruyama
- Drew Massey
- Jess McKay
- Alison Mork
- Carla Rudy
- Paul Rugg
- Russ Walko
- Vanessa Whitney
- Victor Yerrid

== Other appearances ==
Puppet Up! was featured in an episode of Celebrity Apprentice. Like Sesame Workshop, some of the puppet characters from Puppet Up! have appeared in other series, including Simian Undercover Detective Squad, Neil's Puppet Dreams, That Puppet Game Show and The Glorious Ladies of Puppetry. They often appear as different panelists on the news satire series No, You Shut Up!. Most of the show's puppets also appeared in The Happytime Murders, a North American Nintendo commercial for Star Fox Zero & Coldplay's Biutyful music video.

=== International versions ===
Country	Local title	Network	Premiered/ended
Portugal	The Weirdos (aka. Os Esquisitos)	TVI; YouTube	May 17, 2023 - May 21, 2023
United Kingdom	Puppet Up! - Uncensored	None	August 1, 2013 - August 26, 2013
United Kingdom	That Puppet Game Show	BBC One	August 10, 2013 - January 5, 2014
United Kingdom	The Weirdos	BBC; YouTube	March 18, 2022 - present

== Awards and nominations ==
Live stage production
Year	Award Ceremony	Category	Nominee	Result
2019	Saturn Award	Saturn Award for Best Local Live Stage Production		Won

== See also ==
- The Early Muppets:
  - The Tonight Show
    - Sam and Friends segments (1955–1961)
- Avenue Q

Preceded by Sam and Friends	Puppet Up! March 8, 2006 - present	Succeeded by None
