= Telling Stories with Tomie dePaola =

- Written by: Jim Lewis; Kati Rocky; Craig Shemin
- Directed by: David Gumpel
- Starring: Tomie dePaola; Puppeteers: Bill Barretta; Julianne Buescher; John Kennedy; Greg Ballora; Alison Mork; James Murray
- No. of seasons: 1

Production
- Executive producers: David Gumpel; Halle Stanford
- Production company: The Jim Henson Company

Original release
- Network: Hallmark Channel
- Release: August 6 – September 11, 2001

Telling Stories with Tomie dePaola was a 2001 children's television series produced by The Jim Henson Company.

== Plot ==
This show is about Tomie dePaola and his squirrel sidekick Gabe who present stories revolving around his storybook characters. He also has some guest storytellers stop by.

== Characters ==
- Tomie dePaola (himself) is the main character of the series.
- Gabe the Squirrel (performed by John Kennedy) is a mischievous red squirrel who is Tomie's friend, confidant, and muse.
- The Animal Band is a group of woodland creatures that Gabe the Squirrel visits every episode. It consists of a raccoon on keytar (performed by John Kennedy), a weasel on guitar (performed by Julianne Buescher), a rabbit on drums (performed by James Murray), a penguin on bass guitar (performed by Greg Ballora), and three other rabbits in sunglasses where one plays the saxophone and the other two serve as the backup singers. They sing about the topic of each episode.
- Strega Nona (performed by Bill Barretta) is an elderly lady who always wants help from her friends Big Anthony and Bambolona.
  - Big Anthony (performed by John Kennedy) is a tall dimwitted man who is one of Strega Nona's friends.
  - Bambolona (performed by Julianne Buescher) is one of Strega Nona's friends. With Bambolona being a live-hand puppet, Julianne Buescher is assisted in performing her by James Murray who operates Bambolona's right hand.
- Goat (performed by James Murray) is an unnamed goat that appeared in the "Strega Nona" segments. He and Bambolona don't get along very well as Bambolona claims that it doesn't really help at all, but the goat is usually shown to have more intelligence than most of the characters. The character of "Goat" was based on the designs from Tomie dePaola's illustrated "Strega Nona" books. The design featured a departure from the traditional Muppet-look appearance as the goal was to match the water color illustrations found in the book. His puppet was built by James Wojtal working under the supervision of Rollie Krewson.

== Episodes ==
1. "Tales Around the Table" (August 6, 2001)
2. "Where Do You Get Ideas?" (August 7, 2001)
3. "What's a Story?" (August 8, 2001)
4. "Stories For Myself" (August 9, 2001)
5. "Food as Storytelling" (August 10, 2001)
6. "That's a Story?!?" (August 13, 2001)
7. "Getting Started" (August 14, 2001)
8. "Character" (August 15, 2001)
9. "Setting" (August 16, 2001)
10. "Point of View" (August 17, 2001)
11. "Performance of Storytelling" (August 20, 2001)
12. "Every Picture Tells a Story" (August 21, 2001)
13. "Making Sense of Our World Through Stories" (August 22, 2001)
14. "Taking a Chance" (August 23, 2001)
15. "Finding Your Audience" (August 24, 2001)
16. "Funny" (August 27, 2001)
17. "Scary" (August 28, 2001)
18. "Moods: Happy/Sad" (August 29, 2001)
19. "History" (August 30, 2001)
20. "Music" (August 31, 2001)
21. "Make Believe Stories" (September 4, 2001)
22. "Real Stories" (September 5, 2001)
23. "More Than One Way to Tell a Tale - Versions" (September 6, 2001)
24. "More Than One Way to Tell a Tale - Techniques" (September 7, 2001)
25. "Putting Heart Into Your Story" (September 10, 2001)
26. "Collaboration" (September 11, 2001)

== Cast ==
- Tomie dePaola - Himself

=== Puppeteers ===
- Bill Barretta - Strega Nona, Pepe the King Prawn (episode 8)
- Julianne Buescher - Bambolona, Guitar-Playing Weasel
- John Kennedy - Gabe the Squirrel, Keytar-Playing Raccoon, Big Anthony
- Greg Ballora - Bass Guitar-Playing Penguin
- Alison Mork -
- James Murray - Drum-Playing Rabbit, Goat, Right Hand of Bambolona
- Steve Whitmire - Kermit the Frog (episode 25), Rizzo the Rat (episode 25)

== Other appearances ==
- The puppet for Gabe the Squirrel later appeared in Bear in the Big Blue House as Skippy the Squirrel.
- The puppets for Gabe the Squirrel and the Goat have been used in different Henson Alternative projects:
  - The puppets for Gabe the Squirrel and the Goat later appeared in Puppet Up!.
  - The puppet for the Goat later appeared in Simian Undercover Detective Squad episode "It's a Mad, Mad, Mad, Mad Goat" as Mad Goat.
  - The puppets for Gabe the Squirrel and the Goat appear in Neil's Puppet Dreams.
  - The puppets for Gabe the Squirrel and the Goat appear in No, You Shut Up!.
