= Futz =

Futz or Futz! may refer to:

- Futz, a play by Rochelle Owens
- Futz, a 1969 film by Tom O'Horgan based on the play
- Captain Marion Futz, a fictional character in Simian Undercover Detective Squad
- Futz!, a 2007 animated series
