= The Sam Plenty Cavalcade of Action Show Plus Singing! =

2008 American web series

The Jim Henson Company Presents The Sam Plenty Cavalcade of Action Show Plus Singing! is a live action web-series from the Jim Henson Company. The series was created and directed by Paul Rugg and Mitch Schauer.

== Synopsis ==
The series is designed as a Western comedy musical with science-fiction and action adventure elements, starring cowboy hero Sam Plenty. Victor Yerrid described Sam Plenty in a 2007 interview as "a throwback to the old Gene Autry Show". In particular, the premise recalls Autry's 1935 serial The Phantom Empire, in which Autry and friends must battle an evil queen, robots, and various sci-fi devices.

The show is an over-the-top tongue-in-cheek parody of classic television serials. The first serial in "The Sam Plenty Cavalcade of Action Show Plus Singing!" was titled "Sam Plenty in Underdoom". The first installment of the five-episode serial debuted on the web on March 10, 2008 (although adding the parody element, the episodes begin at "part 3").

The cast consists of a mixture of television and film actors. The Sam Plenty troupe also includes several veteran Henson puppeteers includes Yerrid (as Bob Choppy), Drew Massey (as Sam Plenty), and Allan Trautman (as the professor). Emmy-winning composers Julie and Steve Bernstein (Animaniacs, Pinky and the Brain, and many others) wrote the music for the series. A sample of the project was screened at the 2007 San Diego Comic-Con.

== Episode list ==
Serial	Part	Title	Posted	Summary	#
Sam Plenty in Underdoom	Part 3	"Test of Doom!"	March 10, 2008	Queen Verbosa has ordered her doom riders to put Sam to a test to secretly evaluate his legendary abilities. The doom riders have captured Billy and thrown him off a cliff to see what Sam will do. Sam rescues Billy with his laso and pulls him to safety. Upon hearing this Queen Verbosa calls upon Sergeant Munch and his army of invisible doom riders to capture Sam Plenty and bring the cowboy to her. Back at the ranch the gang sings "Cow Pie Patty Serenade" when suddenly Sam finds himself attacked by a swarm of invisible doom riders.	1
Sam Plenty in Underdoom	Part 4	"Explosion of Doom!"	March 17, 2008	Queen Verbosa - ruler of all Underdoom - has ordered her Doom Riders to march invisibly to the Plenty Ranch. Using their concealment gyros, the Doom Riders have the ranch surrounded. Escape is impossible! Just as the Doom Riders are about to kill Sam Plenty, Sergeant Munch receives a communication from Queen Verbosa. She tells him not to kill Sam Plenty, but rather bring him to her alive. However Sam will not go without a fight, and he single-handedly begins to fight off the invisible invaders. But the Doom Riders outnumber Sam and soon have him restrained. Sergeant Munch is not amused by Sam's unwillingness to cooperate and decides to teach him a lesson. He pulls out his exploding gun, points it at Sam's friends and fires. Sam's friends (including Marion, Hanalei, Billy, Bob, Fetcheye, and the Professor) being to explode!	2
Sam Plenty in Underdoom	Part 5	"Purification of Doom"	April 7, 2008	Queen Verbosa's Doom Riders have marched to Plenty Ranch to capture Sam. Sam's attitude has angered Sergeant Munch who has turned the Exploding Gun on Sam's friends. Sam kicks the gun out of Sergeant Munch's hands, saving his friends- but it causes his horse, Marzipan, to explode instead! Or perhaps not...Marzipan is safe and sound on the roof of Plenty Ranch- her tail just blewed off. Sam surrenders to Sergeant Munch, and the Doom Riders take him away, along with Marion and Billy. The rest of the gang is put to sleep. Queen Verbosa locks Sam away in the Purification Thing, and Sam emerges...dead!	3
Sam Plenty in Underdoom	Part 6	"March of Doom!"	April 21, 2008	Sam, Marion and Billy have been captured and brought to the underground civilization of Underdoom. Queen Verbosa has ordered that Sam be purified in the often fatal Purification Chamber. It turns out that Sam is not dead after all- however, Queen Verbosa plans to make him one of her Doom Warriors. Meanwhile, back at Plenty Ranch, the rest of the gang reawakens, and the Professor constructs a machine to track the invisible Doom Riders to their underground lair. However, a Doom Warrior awaits them at the entrance, and is about to make them explode...again!	4
Sam Plenty in Underdoom	Part 7	"Hat of Doom!"	May 5, 2008	Sam has been purified and Queen Verbosa has ordered that he wear the undergarments of Underdoom. Meanwhile, Hanalei, the Professor, Bob, and Fetcheye have been captured and are being exploded. Hanalei throws a pig at the Doom Warrior, takes his gun, and explodes him. When asked to entertain Queen Verbosa, Sam sings a song about how much he prefers living on the surface to living underground, angering the Queen. As Sam's friends arrive to save him, Queen Verbosa activates Sam's Hat of Control and orders him to capture and kill his friends.	5

== Cast ==
- Drew Massey as Samuel "Sam" Plenty
- Zand Broumand as Sergeant Yak Munch
- Jeffrey Cannata as Doom Rider
- Stephanie Denise Griffin as Marion Weadle
- Golda Inquito as Hanalei
- Jay Mawhinney as Lord Grand Chapeau
- Dan Mott as William "Billy" Weadle
- Marie O'Donnell as Queen Verbosa
- Jerry Trainor as Fetcheye
- Allan Trautman as Professor August Weadle
- Victor Yerrid as Robert "Bob" Choppy
