= Sid the Science Kid: The Movie =

2013 animated film

- Official poster
- Directed by: Kirk R. Thatcher
- Written by: Bradley Zweig
- Based on: Sid the Science Kid by The Jim Henson Company
- Produced by: David B. Miller; Chris Plourde
- Starring: Drew Massey; Alice Dinnean Vernon; Allan Trautman; Julianne Buescher; Christopher Lloyd; Bruce Lanoil; Victor Yerrid; Donna Kimball; America Ferrera
- Edited by: Brian Anton
- Music by: Mike Himelstein; Brett Perry
- Production companies: The Jim Henson Company; Nine Eyes Stone Pictures; Shanghai Animation Film Studio
- Distributed by: PBS Kids (television); NCircle Entertainment (home video)
- Release dates: March 25, 2013 (PBS Kids); April 2, 2013 (DVD release)
- Running time: 75 minutes
- Countries: United States; China
- Language: English

Sid the Science Kid: The Movie is a 2013 animated science fiction comedy film directed by Kirk R. Thatcher and based on the PBS Kids television series of the same name. Serving as the series finale, the film follows the titular character, voiced by Drew Massey, who visits a science museum with his friends before it opens to the public and must stop a robot tour guide from wreaking havoc.

Sid the Science Kid: The Movie premiered on PBS Kids on March 25, 2013, before a home video release by NCircle Entertainment on April 2.

== Premise ==
Sid and his classmate Gabriela enter a contest and win the chance to visit a new modern science museum before its grand opening. There, the kids meet a quirky scientist who has designed robot tour guides for the museum. However, one of the robots goes haywire and puts the museum's opening in jeopardy, leaving it up to Sid and his friends to find the robot before it causes destruction.

== Cast ==
- Drew Massey as Sid / Stack
- Alice Dinnean Vernon as Gabriela / Mom / Miao Hu / QT9
- Allan Trautman as Yangyang
- Julianne Buescher as May / Grandma / Niuniu
- Christopher Lloyd as Dr. Bonabodon
- Bruce Lanoil as Bobbybot / Ira / Zippa
- Victor Yerrid as Gerald / Dad / Popo
- Donna Kimball as Susie / Zeke / Pinki / PA Announcer
- America Ferrera as Dr. Cordova

== Production ==
In March 2012, The Jim Henson Company announced that a film based on the PBS Kids television series Sid the Science Kid would be made, and that the film would be released in 3D; however, the 3D aspect of the film never came to fruition.

The film is a co-production between the United States and China, with The Jim Henson Company partnering with Nine Eyes Stone Pictures and Shanghai Animation Film Studio.

== Release ==
Sid the Science Kid: The Movie premiered on PBS Kids on March 25, 2013, and was released on home video by NCircle Entertainment on April 2, 2013.

== Reception ==
Emily Ashby of Common Sense Media gave the film a positive review, praising the film's "good job of incorporating and demonstrating scientific vocabulary," although she criticized the prominence of Sid due to the film's feature-length runtime as opposed to the runtime of a television episode.
