= Julianne Buescher =

American actor

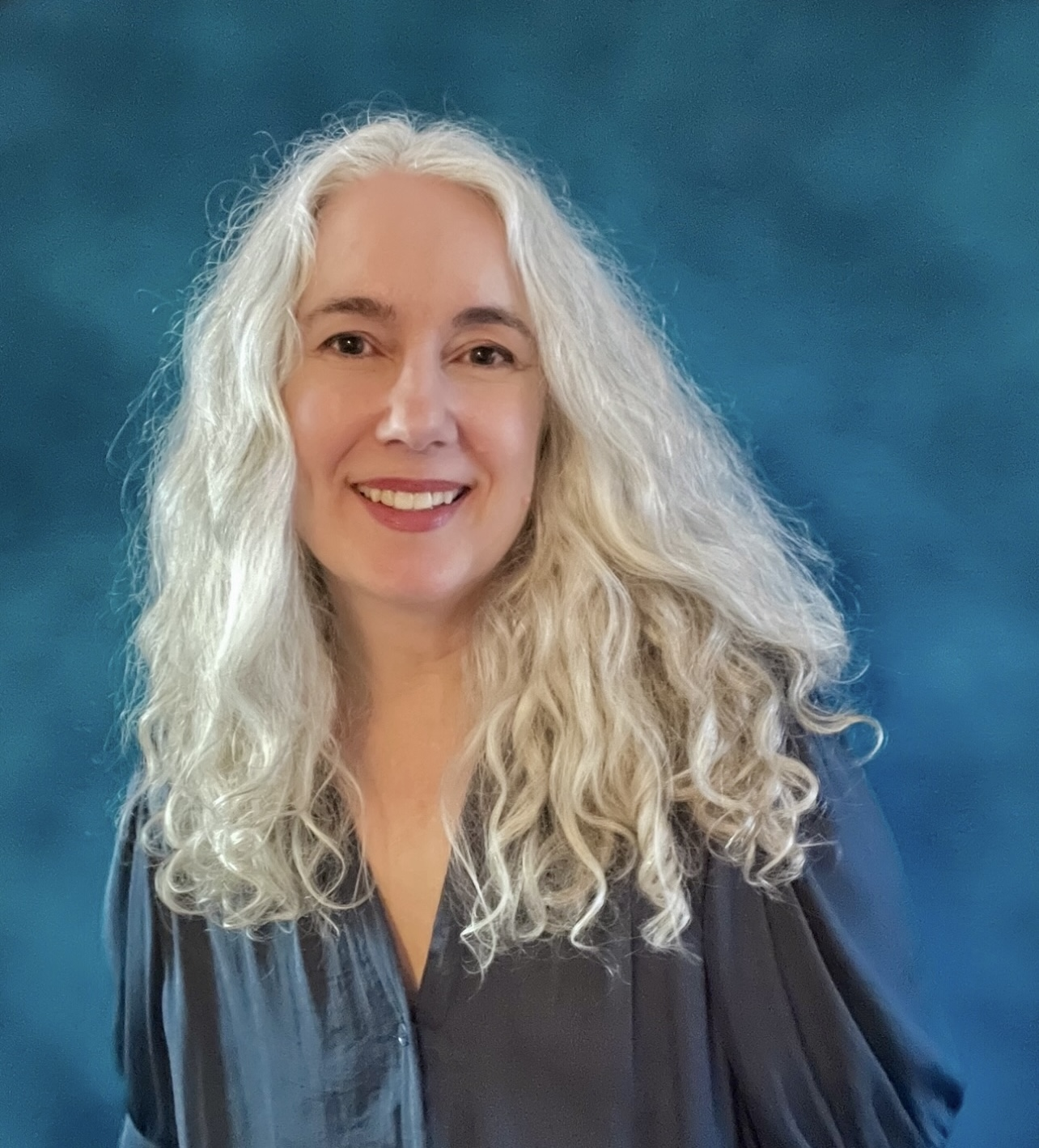
- Buescher in 2025
- Education: DePaul University (BFA)
- Occupations: Actor; Muppet Performer; writer
- Years active: 1985–present
- Agent: CTA Danielle McKelvey
- Notable work: Naruto as Anko Mitarashi The Muppets as Yolanda the Rat and Beverly Plume

Julianne Buescher is an American actor, Muppet Performer and writer who performs in film, television, radio, and on stage. As a voice actor, she is known for many roles including Anko Mitarashi on Naruto. Buescher is also a Muppet Performer for The Jim Henson Company, appearing with CeeLo Green as "Piddles the Pug" at the 2011 Grammy Awards and as the same character among others in the improvisational adult puppet shows (Puppet Up! and Crank Yankers). She also has worked for both Sesame Street and The Muppets.

== Filmography ==
=== Films ===
- Livin' It Up with the Bratz (2006, interactive movie) (voice) (uncredited) .... Cloe/Jade/Yasmin/Sasha
- Muppets Most Wanted (2014) .... US Muppet Performer, Additional Voices
- Star Trek Into Darkness (2013) .... Additional Voices
- Sid the Science Kid: The Movie (2013) (voice) .... Grandma, May, Niuniu
- Scooby-Doo! Music of the Vampire (2012, direct-to-video) (voice) .... Vampire Actor #3 and Kelly Smith
- The Wild (2006) .... Dung Beetle #2
- The Muppets' Wizard of Oz (2005) (as Julianne Buscher) .... Muppet Performer
- Geppetto's Secret (2005) (voice) .... Luna/Goldilocks
- Resculpting Venus (1999) .... Kate
- Mulan (1998) .... Young Bride (singing voice)
- Muppet Classic Theater (1994, direct-to-video) .... Yolanda Rat

=== Anime ===
- Zatch Bell! (2006) .... Alm, Zabas
- Naruto (2003–2005) .... Anko Mitarashi/Akane

=== Cartoons ===
- The Weekenders (2001) .... Frances, Bree, Bebe Cahill
- CatDog (2004) .... Catrin
- American Dad (2005) .... Additional Voices
- Avatar: The Last Airbender (2006) .... Additional Voices
- Sid the Science Kid (2008–2012) .... Grandma, May
- Robot and Monster (2012) .... Tube Voice, Woman

=== Television ===
- Howard Beach: Making a Case for Murder (1989) .... Theresa Fisher
- Dinosaurs (1991–1994) .... Robbie Sinclair (eyes), Roy Hess (arms), Baby Sinclair (arms; Season 4), Ansel (face), Aubrey Molehill (face), Crazy Lou (face), Elder No. 3 (face), Ethyl Phillips (face, occasionally), Katie (face), Mindy (face/voice), Monica DeVertebrae (face), Shopper (puppet/voice), Sitcom Wife (puppet/voice), various other characters
- Muppets Tonight (1995–1998) .... various characters
- The Mr. Potato Head Show (1998–1999) .... Potato Bug, additional voices
- Criminal Minds (2009) .... Meg
- No, You Shut Up! (2013) .... Shelly Spanks
- Community (2013) .... Puppeteer
- Sesame Street .... Blecka the Grouch, Sherry Netherland (1993–1996), Miss A.M. Goat, and others (1991–1998)/Additional Muppets (1991–present)
- The Muppets .... Denise, Yolanda Rat, Debbie (2015–2016)
- Silicon Valley .... Debbie
- Muppets Now (2020) .... Beverly Plume, Yolanda the Rat, Margaret, Rosie the Sheep, Beak-R, Priscilla the Chicken, Brie the Cheese, Elena the Penguin, Some Bunny, a screaming goat, Esther and Mary the Cow
- The Book of Pooh .... Roo
- Muppets Haunted Mansion (2021) .... Yolanda Rat as a Happy Haunt, Beverly Plume as a Happy Haunt, Wanda as a Happy Haunt and Screaming Goat
- Lessons in Chemistry (2023) .... Secretary (Episode 5)
- Musical Mornings with Coo (2007–2009) .... Coo

=== Events ===
- The Muppets Take the Bowl .... additional Muppet Performer, Yolanda Rat, Bunny, Wanda, Dr. Teeth's right hand in "Bohemian Rhapsody" (Live show at the Hollywood Bowl, Sept. 8–10, 2017)
- The Muppets Take the O2.... additional Muppet Performer, Yolanda Rat, Bunny, Wanda, Sheep, Dr. Teeth's right hand in "Bohemian Rhapsody" (Live show at the O2 Arena, Jul. 13-14, 2018)

=== Video games ===
Year	Title	Role	Notes
1999	Star Wars: X-Wing Alliance	Aeron Azzameen	
1999	Star Wars: Episode I - The Gungan Frontier	Gungan Teenager, Gungan Orderly, Gungan Teacher; Gungan Wife, Gungan Baby	
1999	Star Wars: Episode I - The Phantom Menace	Concerned Boy	
2003	Ratchet & Clank: Going Commando	Vendor Girl, Loudspeaker, Help Desk Girl	
2004	The Bard's Tale	Additional Voices	
2006	Naruto: Ultimate Ninja	Anko Mitarashi	
2006	Pirates of the Caribbean: Dead Man's Chest	Tia Dalma	
2006	Open Season	Maria, Skunk	
2006	Star Wars: Lethal Alliance	Rianna Saren	
2007	Pirates of the Caribbean: At World's End	Tia Dalma	
2007	Ratatouille	Celine	
2008	Dark Sector	Nadia Sudek	
2008	Speed Racer: The Videogame	Delila, Mariana Zanja	
2009	Brütal Legend	Battle Nuns	
2010	StarCraft II: Wings of Liberty	Terran Adjutant, Mothership	
2011	Dead or Alive: Dimensions	Helena Douglas	
2011	Shadows of the Damned	Paula, Demons	
2012	Madagascar 3: The Video Game	Gia	
2012	XCOM: Enemy Unknown	Female Soldier	
2012	Epic Mickey 2: The Power of Two	Metairie	
2013	StarCraft II: Heart of the Swarm	Adjutant	
2013	Marvel Heroes	Black Widow	
2013	Disney Infinity	Tia Dalma	
2016–17	Minecraft: Story Mode	Nell, Clutch, Wanda, additional voices	
2018	Hotel Transylvania 3: Monsters Overboard	Ericka Van Helsing	

- Secret Weapons Over Normandy (2003) .... Pauline
- Law & Order: Justice is Served (2004) .... Nicole Beaumont, Claire Thomas
- EverQuest II (2004) .... Generic Female Gnome Merchant, Generic Female Human Merchant, Generic Female Half Elf Merchant, Generic Female Erudite Merchant, Generic Female Dwarf Merchant, Generic Female Halfling Merchant, Generic Female Ratonga Merchant, Generic Female Troll Merchant, Generic Female Dark Elf Merchant
- Guild Wars Prophecies (2005) .... Evennia
- Law & Order: Criminal Intent (2005) .... Jenna Kirkwood, Jennifer Lee, Carla Meyers, Stephanie Novitsky, Barbara Rodriguez, Rosa Sanchez, Rachael Warren
- Guild Wars Nightfall (2006) .... Margrid the Sly, Tormented Soul, Lyssa's Muse
- Livin' It Up with the Bratz (2006) .... Cloe, Yasmin, Sasha, Jade
- The Elder Scrolls V: Skyrim (2011) .... Gabriella, Female Elf Dragonborn, High Elf Females
- Star Wars: The Old Republic (2011) .... Additional Voices
- Kingdoms of Amalur: Reckoning (2012) .... Additional Voices
- Guild Wars 2 (2012) .... Faolain
- Kinect Fun Labs: Kinect Rush - A Disney Pixar Adventures: Snapshot (2012) .... Additional Voices
- Grand Theft Auto V (2013) .... The Local Population
- The Elder Scrolls Online (2014) .... Additional Voices
- Falling Skies: The Game (2014) .... Spiked Kid Female, Berserker Female
- Batman: Arkham Knight (2015) .... Additional Voices
- Guild Wars 2: Heart of Thorns (2015) .... Faolain
- Final Fantasy XV (2016) .... Additional Voices
- The Elder Scrolls Online: Morrowind (2018) .... Additional Voices
- Kingdom Hearts III (2019) .... Tia Dalma

Preceded by None	Performer of Sherry Netherland; 1993-1995	Succeeded by None
Preceded by None	Performer of Wanda; 2017	Succeeded by None
Preceded by None	Performer of Yolanda the Rat; 1994	Succeeded by None
