= Paul Rugg =

American screenwriter and voice actor

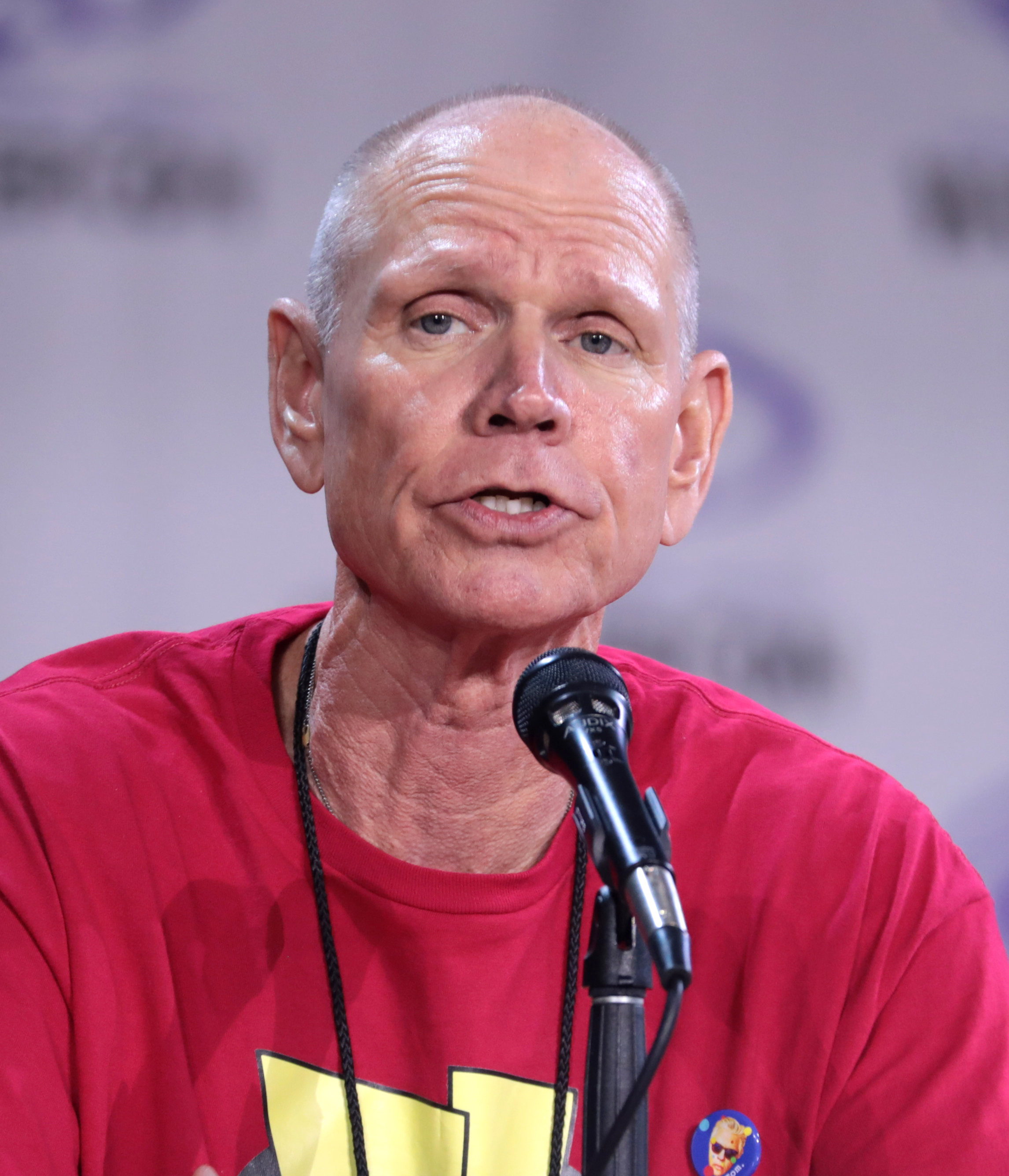
- Rugg at the 2023 WonderCon
- Born: Paul Kevin Rugg; Los Angeles, California, U.S.
- Occupations: Screenwriter, producer, director, voice actor, puppeteer
- Years active: 1985–present
- Agent: SBV Talent Agency
- Spouse: Maria Rugg
- Children: 1
- Website: froynlaven.blogspot.com

Paul Kevin Rugg is an American screenwriter, producer, voice actor, and puppeteer. He is best known for his starring roles in shows like Freakazoid!, Pig Goat Banana Cricket, and Earth to Ned.

== Biography ==
Rugg has worked extensively in the field of animation. His list of credits include writing for, producing, and voice acting in several cartoons, first as the Jerry Lewis-esque Mr. Director in Animaniacs. Afterwards, he voiced the title character in Freakazoid! and Nostradamus in Histeria!, as well as the main recurring villain, Dark Lord Chuckles the Silly Piggy in the Disney series Dave the Barbarian. He also voiced Gweelok for Cartoon Network's Secret Mountain Fort Awesome.

Rugg also appeared live as the eccentric character Manny in the Manny the Uncanny short segments as part of Disney's One Saturday Morning for ABC.

Rugg created and directed The Sam Plenty Cavalcade of Action Show Plus Singing! with Mitch Schauer, on behalf of The Jim Henson Company. He also played the voice of Principal Rotwood in the Disney Channel series American Dragon Jake Long.

Alongside Adam Carolla and John P. McCann, Rugg was an improvisational actor at the ACME Comedy Theatre in Los Angeles, where he created the character Manny the Uncanny.

Rugg was recruited to the Warner Bros. Animation team led by Jean MacCurdy and Tom Ruegger, and was a key contributor to their various series in the 1990s. In 2008, Rugg attended San Diego Comic-Con alongside Paul Dini, Jean MacCurdy, John P. McCann, and Andrea Romano.

Rugg later worked with Brian Henson on Puppet Up! and other projects of The Jim Henson Company under its "Henson Alternative" banner. He reunited with Henson as protagonist Ned in Earth to Ned.

Rugg has been nominated for several Emmy Awards, and has received three. He previously lived up the coast from Los Angeles with his wife Maria and daughter Jillian. In July 2023, Jillian got married, after which Rugg moved to Virginia to live closer to her family.

Rugg has two dogs: Chihuahua Lucky (2006–2020), who was the subject of a viral video; and Marge.

== Filmography ==
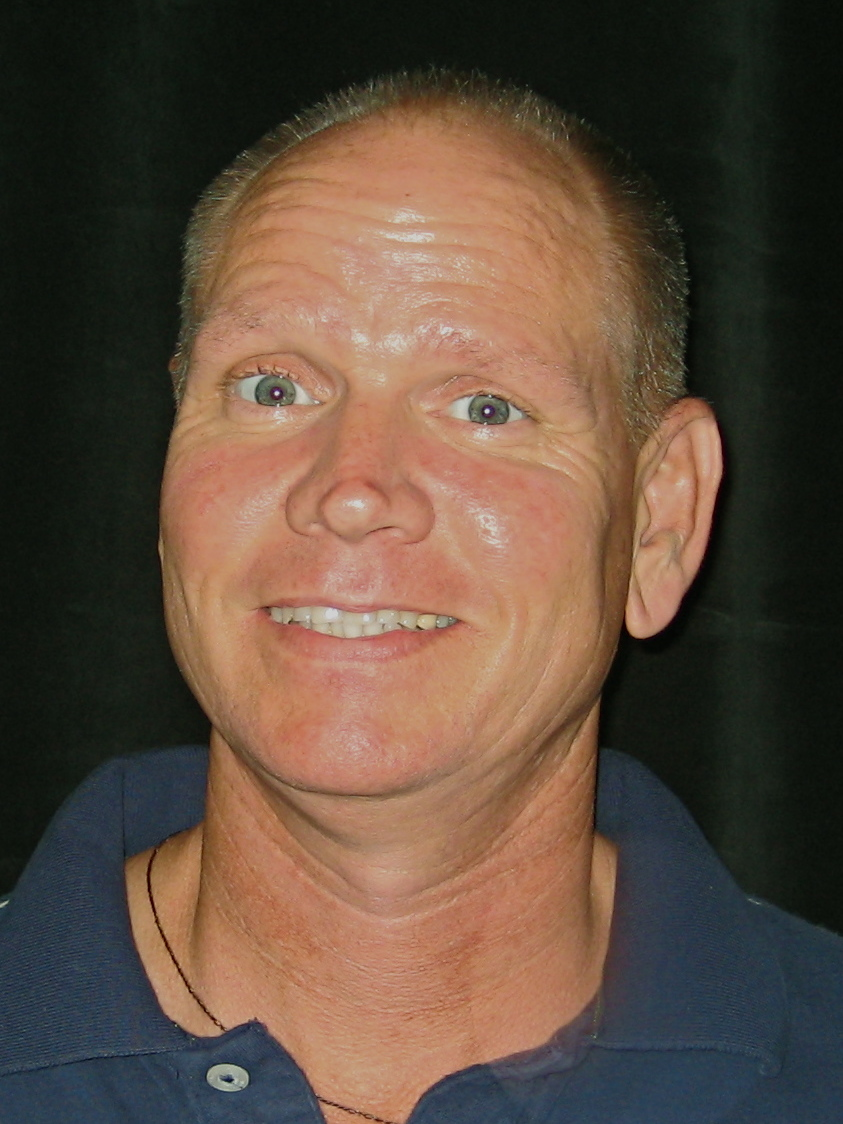
Rugg at San Diego Comic-Con in 2008

=== Television ===
| Year | Title | Role | Notes |
|---|---|---|---|
| 1993–1995 | Animaniacs | Mr. Director, Albert Einstein, Sy Sykman, Mr. Clown, Mrs. Mumphead, Goyt Ferman, Lon Borax, Freakazoid | Voice, 11 episodes |
| 1995–1997 | Freakazoid! | Freakazoid, Paul Harvey, Henry Kissinger, Jocko | Voice, main role (24 episodes) |
| 1996–1998 | Pinky and the Brain | Sultana Sultana, Dr. Belvedere, Mr. Director | Voice, 4 episodes |
| 1997 | One Saturday Morning | Manny the Uncanny, Alistair Flyndiggery, Vanessa | |
| 1998–2000 | Histeria! | Nostradamus, Meriwether Lewis, Montezuma, Merlin, Sergei Eisenstein, Dragon | Voice, 15 episodes |
| 2000 | Buzz Lightyear of Star Command | Cosmo, Ed the Courier, Inspector, Brain Pod #1, Bystander | Voice, 8 episodes |
| 2004–2005 | Dave the Barbarian | Dark Lord Chuckles the Silly Piggy, various voices | Voice, 13 episodes |
| 2005–2007 | American Dragon: Jake Long | Professor Rotwood | Voice, 23 episodes |
| 2007 | The Modifyers | Katz, Baron Vain | Voice, short |
| 2010 | Scooby-Doo! Mystery Incorporated | Dr. Portillo, Male Parent #1, Kelsepsian, Jingle Singer, Hairy Sasquatch | Voice, 2 episodes |
| 2011–2012 | Secret Mountain Fort Awesome | Gweelok | Voice, 13 episodes |
| 2011–2014 | Kung Fu Panda: Legends of Awesomeness | Master Yao, Festival-Goer #1, Oogway Look-Alike, Attendant #2, Teacher | Voice, 4 episodes |
| 2013 | My Science Fiction Project | Chancellor Maniac | Voice, short |
| 2014–2016 | The 7D | Lord Starchbottom | Voice, 43 episodes |
| 2015–2017 | DreamWorks Dragons | Savage | Voice, 9 episodes |
| 2015 | The Fairly OddParents | Grim Reaper | Voice, episode: "Man's Worst Friend" |
| 2015–2016 | The Mr. Peabody & Sherman Show | Napoleon | Voice, 2 episodes |
| 2015–2018 | The Adventures of Puss in Boots | Artephius, various voices | Voice, 57 episodes |
| 2015–2017 | Pig Goat Banana Cricket | Cricket, various voices | Voice, main role (40 episodes) |
| 2018 | We Bare Bears | Mr. Howard | Voice, episode: "Paperboyz" |
| 2019 | The Epic Tales of Captain Underpants | Vert Ladderfeller, Altitooth, Bivouac Ladderfeller | Voice, episode: "Captain Underpants and the Abysmal Altercation of the Abominable Altitooth" |
| 2019 | OK K.O.! Let's Be Heroes | President of the Universe, Cantalop, Ted Viking, Teardrop, Hero #2, UBC Announcer | Voice, 2 episodes |
| 2020–2021 | Cleopatra in Space | Dr. Queed | Voice, 6 episodes |
| 2020 | Teen Titans Go! | Freakazoid | Voice, episode: "Huggbees" |
| 2020–2021 | Earth to Ned | Ned | Main voice role |
| 2022 | Oddballs | Dr. Bolster, Hardware Store Clerk, Orderly | Voice, 4 episodes |
| 2023 | Animaniacs | Mr. Clown | Voice, episode: "The Stickening" |

=== Film ===
| Year | Title | Role | Notes |
|---|---|---|---|
| 1999 | Wakko's Wish | Mr. Director | Voice, direct-to-video |
| 2002 | The Country Bears | TV Reporter | |
| 2006 | The Ant Bully | Ant #5 | Voice |
| 2013 | Scooby-Doo! Stage Fright | Steve Trilby | Voice, direct-to-video |

=== Video games ===
| Year | Title | Role | Notes |
|---|---|---|---|
| 2004 | EverQuest II | Calig Shauwls, Captain Ganwail, Dailin Blainin, Drammer Quickblade, Haunt of Solusek Mines, Lord Fannos Stormhelm | |
| 2006 | Hitman: Blood Money | Additional voices | |
| 2006 | Xiaolin Showdown | Dojo Kanojo Cho | |

=== Web series ===
| Year | Title | Role | Notes |
|---|---|---|---|
| 2006 | Puppet Up! | Himself, Various | |
| 2009 | Alt/Reality | Various | |
| 2010, 2018 | Nostalgia Critic | Himself | 2 episodes |
| 2011 | Puppet for President | Marvin Quasniki | |
| 2012 | Simian Undercover Detective Squad | Captain Marion Futz | |
| 2019 | Too Loud! | Dr. Lewis | |

== Crew work ==
| Year | Title | Role | Notes |
|---|---|---|---|
| 1993–1996 | Animaniacs | Writer, story editor | 76 episodes |
| 1995 | Tiny Toon Adventures | Writer | Episode: "Tiny Toons' Night Ghoulery" |
| 1995 | Pinky and the Brain | Writer | Episode: "Cheese Role Call" |
| 1995–1997 | Freakazoid! | Producer, writer, story editor | 24 episodes |
| 1999 | Histeria! | Writer | Episode: "Presidential People" |
| 2004 | Dave the Barbarian | Writer | Episode: "A Pig's Story" |
| 2008 | The Sam Plenty Cavalcade of Action Show Plus Singing! | Creator, director | |
| 2009 | The Penguins of Madagascar | Writer | Episode: "Popcorn Panic" |
| 2010–2012 | Scooby-Doo! Mystery Incorporated | Writer | 3 episodes |
| 2011–2013 | Kung Fu Panda: Legends of Awesomeness | Writer | 6 episodes |
| 2013 | The Looney Tunes Show | Writer | Episode: "Ridiculous Journey" |
| 2013 | Pac-Man and the Ghostly Adventures | Producer, writer | 18 episodes |
| 2014–2016 | The 7D | Writer | 10 episodes |
| 2015 | The Mr. Peabody & Sherman Show | Writer | Episode: "The Perfect Show" |
