= Statler and Waldorf: From the Balcony =

2005–2006 American web series

Statler and Waldorf: From the Balcony on Movies.com
- Statler and Waldorf: From the Balcony logo
- Genre: Comedy, reviews
- Language: English

Cast and voices
- Hosted by: Statler and Waldorf

Publication
- Original release: June 26, 2005 – September 20, 2006
- Updates: Biweekly

Waldorf (left) and Statler (right) in the balcony.

Statler and Waldorf: From the Balcony is a web series starring the Muppet characters Statler and Waldorf which ran biweekly on Movies.com from June 26, 2005 until September 20, 2006. The series produced 34 episodes and featured many Muppet characters — both well-known classics and newly created characters. The two elderly curmudgeons would discuss upcoming films, watch the latest movie trailers and share the week's "balconism" from their theater box.

Many of the webisodes featured a segment (or segments) featuring other Muppet characters — for example, Pepe the King Prawn often reviewed the recent DVD releases or gave remote reports; and fictional movie trailers or commercials starring other Muppet characters were also commonly seen. Many established Muppet characters appeared — including Rowlf the Dog, Johnny Fiama, The Swedish Chef, Bobo the Bear, Dr. Teeth, Animal, Sam the Eagle, and Sweetums. Plus many new recurring and one-time gag characters would appear in segments, sketches and parodies. Several new characters that frequented the series include Larry and Oliver, Lester Possum, Ted Thomas, Stan and Louie, the Hollywood Pitchmen, the Blimp, Loni Dunne and a pair of musical performers.

== Production ==
From the Balcony was produced by Movies.com in association with Disney's The Muppets Studio and Hirsch Productions.

A test pilot was briefly available online in February 2005. The pilot featured Statler and Waldorf in a movie theater watching, rating and commenting on the latest trailers for The Pacifier and Constantine, additionally Pepe the Prawn appeared to give a rundown on the latest DVD releases. The pilot did not feature the classic balcony set seen in later episodes, a "Balconism" and other regular features the series would later include. The puppeteers on the pilot were Victor Yerrid (Waldorf) and Drew Massey (Statler and Pepe). The pilot was removed from Movies.com in the spring of 2005 and has not been officially released since.

In early June 2005, Movies.com announced that From the Balcony would soon become a regular feature of the site. Biweekly episodes started appearing on Movies.com beginning on June 26. The first eight episodes featured regular Muppet performers Dave Goelz, Steve Whitmire and Bill Barretta performing the cast of Muppets in each episode. However, starting with episode 9, and continuing until the end of the series, Yerrid and Massey returned to take over the main puppeteering duties on the project.

Yerrid commented on his and Massey's role in the series in a 2007 interview stating:

We did about ninety-five percent of the puppeteering so we worked on just about every scene together. We were also involved in the creative meetings and got to pitch characters and segment ideas.

The opening of each episode started with a quick first-person perspective traveling through the El Capitan Theatre. The song "Hey a Movie!" from The Great Muppet Caper was used as the theme song in early run of the series before being replaced with an original instrumental composition for later episodes (starting with episode 5). The show originally was produced in the traditional 4:3 (1.33:1) aspect ratio, but starting with episode 15, and continuing for the rest of the series' run, the picture switched to a 16:9 (1.78:1) widescreen format.

Through the 15-month run of the series, the show produced 34 episodes. Aside from the biweekly episodes, the series produced sets of promotional Halloween and Oscar clips that were released to television news syndicates for incorporation in news broadcasts to promote the series. Statler and Waldorf also appeared from the set of From the Balcony in a promotional tie-in to introduce the films for ESPN Classic's Reel Classics Extra beginning in October 2005. The characters and balcony set were also featured in a public service announcement for the Will Rogers Institute in late 2005.

In October 2006, after the 34th episode of the webshow debuted online, Movies.com set the following message via the "Balcony Bulletin" mailing list (an e-mail mailing list that would alert subscribers when a new episode was posted):

Dear Statler & Waldorf Fans:

As you know, your favorite cranky critics, Statler and Waldorf, are getting up there in years. While they're not ready for retirement, they've decided to take some time away from the balcony for some well-earned rest and relaxation (read: finding new things to complain about).

Don't despair, though—during the hiatus you can still enjoy classic From the Balcony. Every show is available for viewing in the archives! There's also a rumor going around that everyone's favorite curmudgeons may be popping in for special appearances on new parts of Movies.com. Stick around to find out where!

Although the show was said to only be on a "hiatus", it never returned.

Due to the acquisition of Movies.com by Comcast's Fandango, the series is no longer available at Movies.com.

The Muppet Newsflash: A Jim Henson News Blog announced on Sept. 17, 2009, that Statler and Waldorf would release a book titled From the Balcony in 2010, which never came out.

== Awards and recognitions ==
In August 2006 TIME Magazine named the series among "the 25 Sites We Can't Live Without" (sharing the ranks with eBay, Amazon.com, Google and Wikipedia).

From The Balcony won a Silver Telly at The Telly Awards in 2006, for best use of comedy. Movies.com was awarded the highest-level Silver Telly Award for "Best use of Humor in a Non-Broadcast Video" for From the Balcony's creative spoof of the film Dukes of Hazzard.

In April 2007, the series was nominated for, and won, a Webby Award. The series' nomination, in the "Comedy: Long Form or Series" category, was Movies.com's first ever nomination for a Webby. Public voting ran on the Webby Awards website throughout April 2007 to decide the winners of the award. On May 1, 2007 it was announced that From the Balcony was the winner of the "People's Voice 2007: Webby for Best Comedy Long Form or Series" due to the show gaining the most votes out of the five the nominees in the category.

== Episodes ==
Episode	Originally posted	Balconism	Guests
Test Pilot	February 25, 2005	none	Pepe the King Prawn
Statler and Waldorf take a look at The Pacifier and Constantine however the pair is unable to get a consistent rating scale to rank the films. Pepe the King Prawn pops in to give a rundown on the latest DVD releases - Saw, I Heart Huckabees, Donnie Darko and Taxi.
Episode 1	June 26, 2005	Dej-HAH-vous	Pepe the King Prawn
Statler and Waldorf take a look at the trailers for War of the Worlds and Bewitched. The pair rank each film on their "Snooze-O-Meter" noting how far into the film they will fall asleep. Plus the two toss it over to Pepe the King Prawn to talk about the newest titles on DVD - Miss Congeniality 2, Coach Carter and Hostage.
Episode 2	July 6, 2005	KILL-dren	Rowlf the Dog
Statler and Waldorf preview Charlie and the Chocolate Factory and Fantastic Four. The two rank the films on the "old man driving scale" noting how fast they would drive to (or away from) the film. Rowlf the Dog stops by the set of The Wedding Crashers to give tips on how to be a wedding crasher.
Episode 3	July 18, 2005	Expenda-BILL	Johnny Fiama
Statler and Waldorf preview Stealth and The Island. Plus Johnny Fiama interviews Keanu Reeves (through edited footage).
Episode 3: Bonus Clip	July 19, 2005	none	Pepe the King Prawn
Upset that Johnny Fiama took his place in episode 3, Pepe releases a "top-secret" video giving his take on the week's new DVD releases.
Episode 4	August 3, 2005	COUGH-in	The Swedish Chef
Statler and Waldorf review The Dukes of Hazzard and Deuce Bigalow: European Gigolo. Plus the Swedish Chef makes a pair Daisy Duke jeans.
Episode 5	August 18, 2005	Doggie-DAR	Pepe the King Prawn
Statler and Waldorf review The 40-Year-Old Virgin and Red Eye; plus Pepe is on the street to talk about Sin City, Beauty Shop and A Lot Like Love on DVD.
Episode 6	September 1, 2005	TRAVOLTED	Pepe the King Prawn
Statler and Waldorf host "The Balc-y Awards" covering the best (or in their case, worst) in summer movies.
Episode 7	September 14, 2005	Lucky BLAST-ard	Bobo the Bear
Statler and Waldorf review Just Like Heaven and Corpse Bride. The two also share a rare Star Wars: Episode III audition tape from Bobo the Bear.
Episode 8	September 29, 2005	Prev-EULOGY	Pepe the King Prawn
Statler and Waldorf review Into the Blue and Two for the Money. Plus Pepe is on the red carpet of Flightplan where he interviews such celebrities as Brent Sexton, Peter Sarsgaard, Michael Irby, Constance Marie, Isaiah Washington, Jodie Foster, Erika Christensen and several other guests.
Episode 9	October 12, 2005	CON-mercial	Dr. Teeth and Animal
Statler and Waldorf review Doom and Elizabethtown. Plus Dr. Teeth and Animal talk about Shopgirl's love triangle.
Episode 10	October 27, 2005	Coinci-DANCE	The Weather Guy
Statler and Waldorf review Jarhead and The Legend of Zorro. The Weather Guy checks in with the report for the movie The Weather Man.
Halloween Press Clips	October 28, 2005	RUN-derwear	No guest
In a series of videos not released on the official website, Statler (dressed as an Egyptian mummy) and Waldorf (dressed as Count Dracula) give a "Halloween Film Countdown". These clips were released to news syndicates to air as promotion for the web series.
Episode 11	November 11, 2005	BLONDE-tourage	Sam the Eagle
Statler and Waldorf review Get Rich or Die Tryin' and Harry Potter and the Goblet of Fire. Sam the Eagle gives an editorial on the Johnny Cash movie Walk the Line.
Episode 12	November 26, 2005	WEAK-quel	Stan and Louie
Statler and Waldorf review Rent and In the Mix. Plus the theater rats Stan and Louie give their take from "Below the Balcony".
Episode 13	December 10, 2005	HACK-tors	Ivan the Villager, Sweetums, Clive Focus, Penguins
Statler and Waldorf review The Chronicles of Narnia: The Lion, the Witch and the Wardrobe and King Kong. Plus Ivan the Villager and Sweetums beg for Hollywood's mercy and Clive Focus gets shots of the stars of March of the Penguins.
Episode 14	December 24, 2005	YULE LOG-jam	Larry and Oliver
Statler and Waldorf give their Christmas film countdown from a decked out balcony. Plus Larry and Oliver act out every Christmas movie ever made.
Episode 15	January 7, 2006	Fluctu-WEIGHT	Assorted Whatnots, Animals, and Aliens, Indiana, Sam the Eagle, French Critic
Statler and Waldorf showcase some of the international rip-offs of their webshow, while Indiana complains about being a fly-over state (with a disclaimer from Sam the Eagle).
Episode 16	January 20, 2006	WIN-jury	Alvy Mellish, Lester Possum
Statler and Waldorf review Big Momma's House 2 and Underworld: Evolution. Alvy Mellish weighs in on Match Point and Lester Possum takes to the streets to find out what the average movie goer is thinking.
Episode 17	February 4, 2006	Romantic KARMA-dy	Deliveryman, Loni Dunne, Ted Thomas, Mr. Movie, Billy
Statler and Waldorf review Firewall and The Pink Panther. Meanwhile, Ted Thomas and Loni Dunne discuss the Oscar nomination announcements. And Mr. Movie gives Billy a lecture on how movies are made.
Episode 18	February 18, 2006	It's OVER-ture	Oscar envelope, detective, Sam the Eagle, Lester Possum
Statler and Waldorf host their big Oscar prediction episode. A detective interrogates an Oscar envelope and Lester Possum goes to the street to hear people's views on who will win at the Oscars.
Oscar Press Clips	March 2, 2006	none	No guest
In a series of videos not released on the official website, Statler and Waldorf are interviewed on their Oscar predictions. These clips were released to news syndicates to air as promotion for the web series.
Episode 19	March 4, 2006	PROM-blematic	Ted Thomas, Hugo, Spamela Hamderson, assorted animals
Statler and Waldorf are off to the beach to review Failure to Launch, Ultraviolet, and 16 Blocks. Ted Thomas interviews Hugo, the star of The Shaggy Dog. Plus a commercial for "Muppets Gone Wildlife".
Episode 20	March 18, 2006	ACT-lete	Penguins, Larry and Oliver
Statler and Waldorf review She's the Man, Inside Man and V for Vendetta. The Muppet penguins star in a promo for March Madness of the Penguins and Larry and Oliver are back to reenact every sports movie ever made in another installment of "Film Crew Theater".
Episode 21	April 1, 2006	Hide and SEQUEL	The Hollywood Pitchmen, Young Statler and Waldorf
A pair of anxious Hollywood pitchmen try to sell new ideas of movie sequels and Statler and Waldorf show an old (black-and-white and silent) episode of "From the Balcony".
Episode 22	April 15, 2006	PET-amorphosis	Stan and Louie
Statler and Waldorf show their American Idol audition and Stan and Louie are back for another view from "Below the Balcony".
Episode 23	April 29, 2006	THESPIAN-age	Tom Cruise Muppet, Tom Cruise's assistant, Loni Dunne
Statler and Waldorf show sneak-peeks at the trailers for Mission: Impossible 4: Ridiculously Impossible and Mission: Impossible 5: Impossibly Impossible; plus Loni Dunne interviews an excited Tom Cruise.
Episode 24	April 29, 2006	LAUGHTER-math	Rejected Mutants (The Blimp, The Procrastinator, The Defroster, Beaverine, The Invisible Twins, and Scorn), musical performers
Statler and Waldorf showcase some rejected mutant auditions for X-Men including The Blimp, The Procrastinator, The Defroster, Beaverine, The Invisible Twins, and Scorn. The duo also take a look at a trailer for a made-up film, Poseidon: The Musical.
Episode 25	May 27, 2006	Opening FREAK-end	Waldorf's replacement
Inspired by The Break-Up, Statler and Waldorf go their separate ways. While Waldorf is at home alone, Statler brings in a new co-host to review The Omen.
Episode 26	June 10, 2006	STARING wheel	Manny Folds, The Swedish Chef
Statler and Waldorf, with the help of Manny Folds, talk about all the summer car films. The duo gets the balcony pimped out; and The Swedish Chef makes "Nacho Libres".
Episode 27	June 24, 2006	Armed FARCES	Ted Thomas, Craig Kent, Superman Muppet
Statler and Waldorf review An Inconvenient Truth. Ted Thomas interviews Clark Kent's cousin Craig Kent where mistakes him for Clark Kent. Plus Superman returns... a DVD.
Episode 28	July 7, 2006	Yo HO HUM	James Lipton Muppet, Polly Wanna Cracker, Long Joel Silver
Statler and Waldorf look for buried treasure in the balcony after talking about Pirates of the Caribbean: Dead Man's Chest. "Inside the Actors Studio" takes gets up close with a staring pirate's parrot. Plus Long Joel Silver advertises the "Movies for the Marooned Box Set".
Episode 29	July 22, 2006	MAD-aptation	Tom Cruise Muppet, David Hasselhoff Muppet
David Hasselhoff and Tom Cruise star as Statler and Waldorf in the big screen adaptation of From the Balcony.
Episode 30	August 4, 2006	HELL-titude	Bunnies, sheep, birds
Statler and Waldorf have some problems with the camera as they showcase many Snakes on a Plane knockoffs - such as Bunnies on a Balloon and Sheep on a Submarine.
Episode 31	August 18, 2006	In-FAD-uation	Ted Thomas Sr., George Lucas Muppet, Woody Allen Muppet, alien
Statler and Waldorf are on vacation, so the producers treat viewers to From the Balcony's last good episode - an episode from 1977. Ted Thomas Sr. interviews rising director George Lucas, and a younger Statler and Waldorf take a look at what Close Encounters of the Third Kind would have been like if Woody Allen directed.
Episode 32	September 2, 2006	FLICK-tion	Coach Gruesome, Flopsy, Larry and Oliver
Statler and Waldorf's "Back to School Special". Larry and Oliver return to reenact every high school movie ever made in another installment of "Film Crew Theater". Plus Flopsy prepares to play in the big football game.
Episode 33	September 16, 2006	POP-coronary	Caspar Von Blimpman, The Maltese Falcon, musical performers
Statler and Waldorf showcase a film noir parody starring Statler as Dashiell Chander. The two critics also show off a clip from another upcoming musical about going to the movies.
Episode 34	September 20, 2006	OS-carred	Jimmy Pureisle, The Hollywood Pitchmen
Statler's new intern Jimmy quickly outgrows his coffee fetching job and rises to the high heights of fame. The Hollywood pitchmen return to pitch wild prequels to Jimmy. Soon Jimmy's 15 minutes of fame are up. In a twist ending, Jimmy, in hope of a comeback, buys the balcony and takes over the show.

== Reel Classic Extra ==
Statler and Waldorf on Reel Classic Extra.

Starting on August 28, 2005 (and continuing for 19 weeks), Statler and Waldorf hosted ESPN Classic's Reel Classics Extra, a weekly sports-themed movie programing block, with antics from the balcony. The brief introductory clips were filmed as part of production for Statler and Waldorf: From the Balcony - using the same puppets, sets, crew. Aside from introducing the films, the clips heavily promoted the webshow with on-screen pop-up advertisements saying "for more Statler & Waldorf go to movies.com". An archive of these introductions was added to the From the Balcony website afterwards in 2006; they remain part of the show's video collection at Movies.com.

Statler and Waldorf's 19 special "Reel Classic Extra" intros were for the following films:

- Eight Men Out
- Hoosiers
- Hustle
- Let It Ride
- One on One
- Rollerball
- Semi-Tough
- The Black Stallion
- The Scout
- Victory
- North Dallas Forty
- American Flyers
- The Fish That Saved Pittsburgh
- Three
- Searching for Bobby Fischer
- Cobb
- Fast Break
- Blue Chips
- Through the Fire

== Credits ==
=== Muppet performers ===
- Steve Whitmire - Statler (episodes 1–8)
- Dave Goelz - Waldorf (episodes 1–8)
- Drew Massey - Statler (episodes 9–34), Animal (episode 9), The Weather Guy (episode 10), Sam the Eagle (episodes 11, 15, 18, and 33), Stan the Rat (episodes 12, and 22), Ivan the Villager (episode 13), Clive Focus (episode 13), Oliver (episodes 14, 20, and 32), Alvy Mellish (episode 16), Mr. Movie (episode 17), Ted Thomas (episodes 17, 19, and 27), Oscar Envelope (episode 18), Hollywood Pitchman #1 (episodes 21 and 34), Tom Cruise Muppet (episodes 23, and 29), Beaverine (episode 24), Manny Folds (episode 26), James Lipton Muppet (episode 28), Long Joel Silver (episode 28), Ted Thomas Sr. (episode 31), Woody Allen Muppet (episode 31), Coach Gruesome (episode 32)
- Victor Yerrid - Waldorf (episodes 9–34), Dr. Teeth (episode 9), Louie the Rat (episodes 12, and 22), Sweetums (episode 13), Larry (episodes 14, 20, and 32), The State of Indiana (episode 15), Lester Possum (episodes 16, and 18), Billy (episode 17), Loni Dunne (episodes 17, and 23), Detective (episode 18), Hugo the Dog (episode 19), Hollywood Pitchman #2 (episodes 21 and 34), The Blimp (episodes 24, and 33), Waldorf's Replacement (episode 25), Superman Muppet (episode 27), Craig Kent (episode 27), Polly Wanna Cracker (episode 28), David Hasselhoff Muppet (episode 29), George Lucas Muppet (episode 31), Close Encounters Alien (episode 31), Flopsy (episode 32), Jimmy Pureisle (episode 34)
- Bill Barretta - Pepe the King Prawn (episodes 1, 3, 5, 6, and 8), Rowlf the Dog (episode 2), Johnny Fiama (episode 3), The Swedish Chef (episodes 4, and 26), Bobo the Bear (episode 7)
- Alice Dinnean - Whatnot Dame (episode 33)
- Allan Trautman - Deliveryman (episode 17)

== Crew ==
- Executive Producer: Ian Hirsch
- Cinematographer: Byron Werner
- Editor: David Tarleton
- Writers: Joe Nussbaum, Mike Pellettieri, David Young
- Director: Ian Hirsch
- Art Director: Marcus Vaughn
- Set Dresser: Amy Mullin
