= Victor Yerrid =

American puppeteer

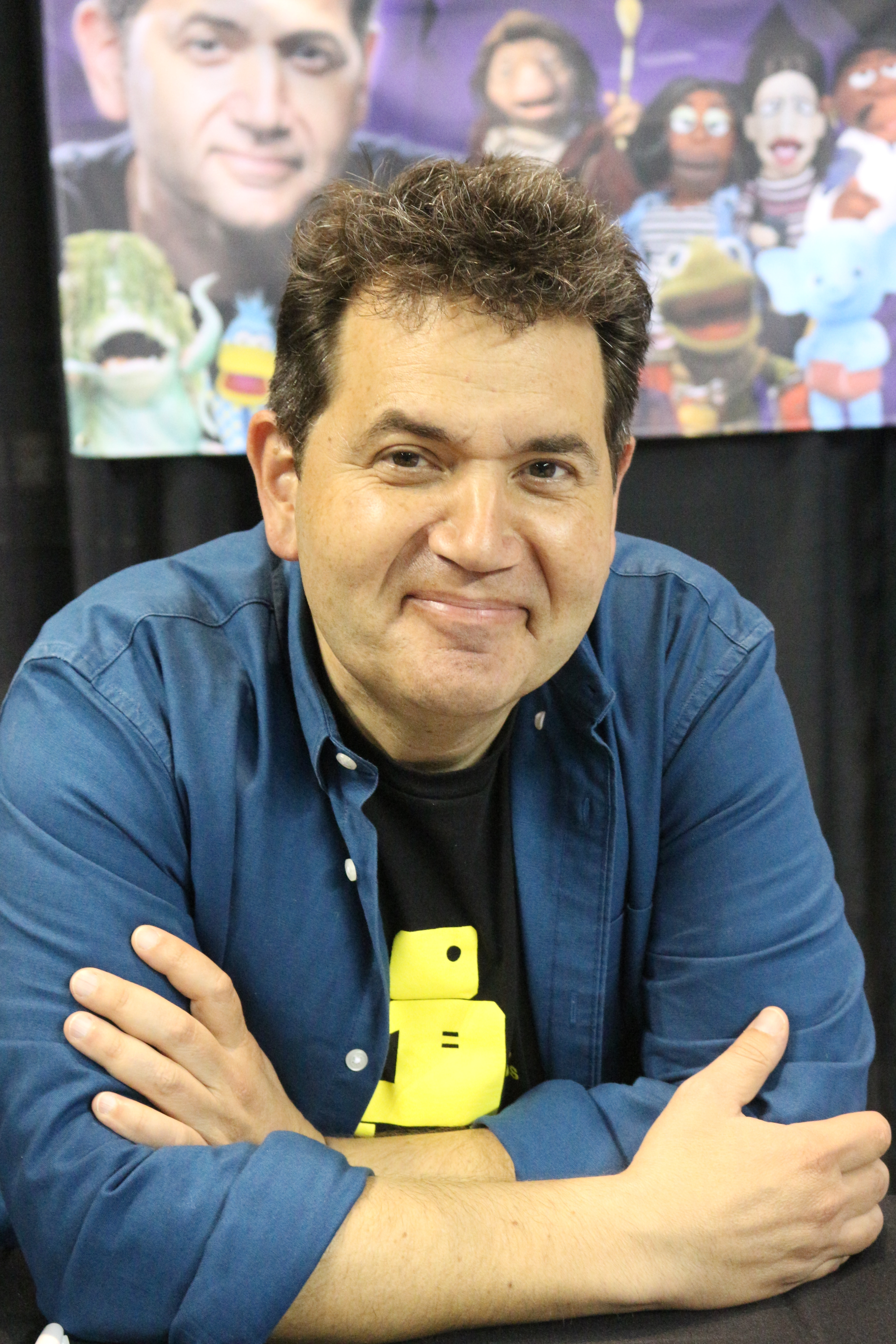
- Yerrid in 2024
- Born: November 13, 1971 (age 55); Glen Mills, Pennsylvania, U.S.
- Occupations: Actor; puppeteer
- Years active: 1991−present

Victor Yerrid (born November 13, 1971) is an American actor and puppeteer for the Jim Henson Company and has performed Muppet characters in many films, television commercials and television shows. He is best known in the Muppet World for his work on the online series Statler and Waldorf: From the Balcony, in which he performed Waldorf along with an assortment of other characters.

Yerrid is also a lead performer of the Jim Henson Company's Puppet Up! improv show and is currently working on The Skrumps for the company as well. He also was a lead puppeteer on the shows Crank Yankers and Greg the Bunny.

== Credits ==
- The Sam Plenty Cavalcade of Action Show Plus Singing: actor (Bob Choppy)
- Bear in the Big Blue House: puppeteer (Cousin Whiner and others)
- The Thundermans: puppeteer
- Sesame Street: staff and puppeteer
- Crank Yankers: puppeteer
- Robot Chicken: voices (Boo-Boo Bear, Tony the Tiger, Kermit the Frog, Miss Piggy, Howard Stern, Swedish Chef, Jack Skellington, Snagglepuss, Rod Serling, Dynomutt, Hannibal, Danny Ocean, Number 5, Various)
- Mad: voices (Miss Piggy, Fozzie Bear, Waldorf, Master Roshi, Star-Lord, Ernie)
- Greg the Bunny: puppeteer (Tardy Turtle, Cranky and others)
- Angel: Polo in "Smile Time"
- Weezer's music video for "Keep Fishin'": puppeteer (Dr. Bunsen Honeydew)
- The Book of Pooh: puppeteer (Owl)
- Between the Lions: puppeteer
- Statler and Waldorf: From the Balcony: puppeteer (Waldorf, Dr. Teeth, Larry, Lester Possum, Loni Dunne, Louie, and others)
- Sid the Science Kid: voices (Gerald and Mort)
- Farscape: The Peacekeeper Wars: puppeteer (Bishan)
- The Producers: Lead Puppeteer (pigeons)
- MuppetFest: puppeteer
- Pajanimals: Squacky
- Disney Cruise Line: puppeteer (Waldorf, Miss Piggy, Fozzie Bear and Sweetums)
- Drawn Together: voice (Blind kid in "Clum Babies")
- Men in Black II: puppeteer
- Puppet Up!: puppeteer
- The Skrumps: puppeteer
- Late Night Liars: puppeteer and voice (The Weasel)
- Muppets from Space: shipping coordinator
- Hannah Montana: actor (Pancake Buffalo)
- The Happytime Murders: Larry Shenanigans Philips, Old Man Puppet
- The Dark Crystal: Age of Resistance: Hup the Podling
- Game Changer: puppeteer (Zam Reich, episode: "Sam Says 3")
- "Weird Al" Yankovic - "Polkamania!" ("Shake It Off" segment, part 1): puppeteer/director
