= Allan Trautman =

American puppeteer (born 1955)

- Allan Trautman in a scene from The Alchemist at the Globe Playhouse circa 1987–1988
- Born: May 25, 1955 (age 71); Brooklyn, New York, United States
- Education: Washington University in St. Louis; California Institute of the Arts
- Occupation: Puppeteer
- Years active: 1974–present

Allan Trautman (born May 25, 1955) is an American puppeteer, best known for his work with The Jim Henson Company.

== Early life ==
He is originally from Brooklyn, New York. Trautman has a B.A. in Physics and Drama from Arts and Sciences at Washington University in St. Louis. He later obtained an MFA in Acting from the California Institute of the Arts in 1978.

== Career ==
He had his first job as a puppeteer during college working on The Letter People. Trautman spent two summers performing at the Colorado Shakespeare Festival. He stayed in Los Angeles after graduation and performed with Sid and Marty Krofft. In 1985, he portrayed The Tarman, one of the lead zombies of the "Return of The Living Dead" film series, often considered one of the most iconic zombies in film. He would return to the role for two of the film's sequels in 1986 and 2005, respectively. Trautman began working with the Muppets in 1990 on Muppet*Vision 3D, which played at Disney's Hollywood Studios from 1991 to 2025, and Disney California Adventure from 2001 to 2014. He has been working with Jim Henson's Creature Shop since 1991 on animatronic projects as well as The Henson Digital Performance Studio. He is a cast member of Henson Alternative's puppet improv show, Puppet Up! (a.k.a. Stuffed and Unstrung), touring to such places as Melbourne and Sydney, Australia. He has also taught improvisation at College of the Canyons in Santa Clarita, California.

== Filmography ==
=== Film ===
- The Return of the Living Dead (1985) — Tarman Zombie
- Return of the Living Dead Part II (1988) — Tarman Zombie
- Cold Dog Soup (1990) — Joseph
- Muppet Classic Theater (1994) — Banker, Father Pig
- Jack Frost (1998) — Puppeteer
- Muppets from Space (1999) — Additional Muppet Performer
- The Flintstones in Viva Rock Vegas (2000) — Juicer (voice, uncredited)
- Monkeybone (2001) — BBQ Pig (voice)
- It's a Very Merry Muppet Christmas Movie (2002, TV Movie) — Eugene, Performer of Joe Snow
- Intolerable Cruelty (2003) — Convention Lawyer
- Return of the Living Dead: Rave to the Grave (2005) — Tarman Zombie
- The Muppets' Wizard of Oz (2005, TV Movie) — Crow, Old Tom
- Sid the Science Kid: The Movie (2013) — Yangyang (voice)
- The Jungle Book (2016) — Animal Voices (voice), Puppeteer
- The Happytime Murders (2018) — Octopus, Puppet Doctor (puppetry only, voiced by Damon Jones)

=== Television ===
- The Letter People (1974-1976) — Mister C, Mister K, Mr. V (puppeteer)
- Dinosaurs — Fran Sinclair (face performer), Grandpa Louie (performer), Winston (performer), Georgie the Hippo (suit performer and normal voice), Bradley P. Richfield (suit performer, occasionally), Mr. Pulman, Dr. Elliot Piaget, Edward R. Hero, Moolah the Cash Cow, Mr. Lizard, Mr. Otto Lynch
- The Puzzle Place — Kyle O'Connor (Season 3 Puppetry only)
- Sid the Science Kid — Director
- Unhappily Ever After — Mr. Floppy Puppeteer
- Puppet Up! on TBS
- Greg the Bunny
- Muppets Tonight — Fairyland Police Chief ("Fairyland PD" segments)
- The Adventures of Timmy the Tooth — Gil the Grouper, Johnny Paste, Sherry the Fairy, Sunny the Sun
- Splash and Bubbles — Bob
- Muppets Haunted Mansion (2021) — Supporting Muppet Performer
- The Muppet Show (2026) — Supporting Muppet Performer

=== Web series ===
- Alt/Reality — Various
- Simian Undercover Detective Squad — Skreet the Orangutan
- Statler and Waldorf: From the Balcony — Deliveryman (ep. 17)

=== Other ===
- Puppet Up! — Performer
- Stuffed and Unstrung — Performer
- Dr. Dolittle — Puppet Coordinator
- The Muppets Take the Bowl — Additional Muppet Performer (live show at the Hollywood Bowl, Sept. 8–10, 2017)
- The Muppets Take the O2 — Additional Muppet Performer (live show at the O2 Arena, Jul. 13-14, 2018)
