= Simian Undercover Detective Squad =

Web series with puppets

- Also known as: S.U.D.S.
- Created by: Deb Loftis; Perry Sachs
- Written by: Deb Loftis; Perry Sachs
- Directed by: Deb Loftis; Perry Sachs
- Starring: Paul Rugg; Esteban Powell; Craig DiFrancia; Puppeteers: Ted Michaels; Allan Trautman
- Country of origin: United States
- No. of episodes: 15

Production
- Executive producers: Brian Henson; Lisa Henson
- Producers: Deb Loftis; Perry Sachs; Allyson Smith

Original release
- Release: April 2, 2012

Simian Undercover Detective Squad (or S.U.D.S.) is a web series created by The Jim Henson Company under its Henson Alternative banner. A sneak preview of the episode "It's a Mad, Mad, Mad, Mad Goat" appeared on YouTube on August 25, 2009, with the series launching on The Nerdist Channel on April 2, 2012. Some of the episodes were released on the Microsoft Zune Video Marketplace.

== Plot ==
The series revolved around primates Skreet and Yeager working for the Simian Undercover Detective Squad in Los Angeles.

== Characters ==
- Skreet (performed by Allan Trautman) – A grizzled orangutan detective who is a veteran bad cop and a loose cannon. Skreet works side by side with Yeager and often goes undercover as a woman or an animal. He is a recycled version of the orangutan puppet used for Jackie the Orangutan and Lawrence the Orangutan from Jim Henson's Animal Show.
- Yeager (performed by Ted Michaels) – A monkey who is a fresh good cop and a S.U.D.S. legacy of being a "banana with a heart of gold." Yeager may not be the sharpest leaf of the bunch but he is good at going undercover. He is a recycled version of Spank the Monkey from Late Night Buffet with Augie and Del.
- Captain Marion Futz (portrayed by Paul Rugg) – Captain Marion Futz is a short-tempered police captain who oversees the S.U.D.S. unit. He often loses his temper when Skreet and Yeager botch a police assignment in any way ranging from the bad guy getting away, Skreet and Yeager accidentally giving themselves away while undercover, or a suspect getting killed during Skreet and Yeager's assignment. Around the end of each webisode, Captain Marion Futz would always give Skreet and Yeager a file labeled "Next Case" which would lead into the next episode. In "A Stalker is Born", it is revealed that Captain Marion Futz is a fan of Josh Peck.
- Spider and Johnny (portrayed by Esteban Powell and Craig DiFrancia) – Two detectives who serve as Skreet and Yeager's more competent rivals.

== Episodes ==
1. The Hairy Hooker (aired on 4/2/12) – While trying to bust a pimp named Barry, Yeager (posing as a man named John) unknowingly arrests Skreet (who was undercover as a prostitute named Trixi) botching the assignment. Infuriated by the mix-up, Captain Futz makes the two of them partners.
2. A Number Between 1 and Death (aired on 4/8/12) – Skreet and Yeager go undercover to bust a Mafia numbers racket which has ties to a criminal organization called the Heptagon.
3. It's a Mad, Mad, Mad, Mad Goat (aired on 4/15/12) – While undercover as a goat and a farmer, Skreet and Yeager infiltrate a dangerous weapons compound where they encounter the Mad Goat who is meeting with a Heptagon scientist in the Heptagon's plot to distribute the Mad Goat Disease.
4. Freaky Fraud-Day (aired on 4/22/12) – While in Pepperidge, Maine, Skreet and Yeager go undercover as conjoined twins at Gamps Magilicutty's Hometown Carnival and Freak show to see if there is a fraud amongst the freaks.
5. C.O.D. – Chimp on Delivery (aired on 4/29/12) – While in Pu Pu Plaza in Silverlake, California, Skreet and Yeager go undercover at a Mail Order Wife ring run by a man named Dave.
6. A Stalker's Born (aired on 5/6/12) – On their last day of the two-week suspension following the incident in the last episode, Skreet and Yeager work as freelancing investigators where they investigate a classic case of a celebrity stalker in Bel-Air Park. They soon discover that the stalker is a celebrity named Josh Peck who is stalking a man named Ted ever since Ted mentioned at a barbecue that the movie Spun was overrated.
7. The Rotten Peel Deal (aired on 5/13/12) – Skreet and Yeager go undercover as spider monkeys in a substance abuse investigation revolving around rotten banana peels.
8. Bootleg Booty – Skreet and Yeager go undercover as a Canadian couple on vacation attempting to buy a bootleg copy of "The Making of Labyrinth" on DVD from P-Nut & Sho' Tee's Discount DVD Outlet on Hollywood Blvd.
9. You're Only As Young As You Steal –
10. Black Market Boobs –
11. Lyin' On The Internet –
12. Grope Therapy –
13. The Maltese Banana – In a film noir parody, Detective Skreet is asked to kill a Mrs. Sternwood's husband. Skreet and Yeager go undercover as "Mike and Ike" to get to the bottom of the case.
14. 21 JumpSkreet –
15. Escape From The Planet of the People –

== Cast ==
- Paul Rugg – Captain Marion Futz
- Esteban Powell – Spider
- Craig DiFrancia – Johnny
- Zand Broumand – Mafia Member (ep. 2), Shelly the Human Shellfish (ep. 4), Rotten Peel Dealer (ep. 7), Sho' Tee (ep. 8)
- Gina D'Acciaro – Anna Bella Scumora (ep. 2), Victim of Dave (ep. 5)
- Bryce Johnson – Barry (ep. 1), Mafia Boss (ep. 2), Man-Half of the Half-Man Half-Woman (ep. 4), Dave (ep. 5), Ted (ep. 6), Mr. Sternwood (ep. 13)
- Marisa Petroro – Tina (ep. 1), Helen the Bearded lady (ep. 4), Victim of Dave (ep. 5), Mrs. Sternwood (ep. 13)
- Jerry Trainor – Heptagon Scientist (ep. 3), Kelly the Elastic Man (ep. 4), Rotten Peel Dealer (ep. 7), P-Nut (ep. 8)

=== Puppeteers ===
- Ted Michaels – Yeager
- Michael Oosterom – Perp (ep. 1), Mad Goat (ep. 3)
- Allan Trautman – Skreet
