= Jim Henson's Animal Show =

- Also known as: Jim Henson's Animal Show with Stinky and Jake
- Written by: Jim Lewis; Jocelyn Stevenson; Bill Oddie; Rob Sprackling; John Smith
- Directed by: Peter Harris
- Starring: Dave Goelz; Steve Whitmire; Bill Barretta; Karen Prell; Louise Gold; Mak Wilson; John Eccleston
- Opening theme: "Here on the Animal Show"
- Ending theme: "Here on the Animal Show"
- Composer: Ed Welch
- Country of origin: United States
- Original language: English
- No. of seasons: 3
- No. of episodes: 65

Production
- Executive producer: Brian Henson
- Producer: Jocelyn Stevenson
- Running time: 30 minutes
- Production company: Jim Henson Productions

Original release
- Network: Fox Kids (seasons 1–2); Animal Planet (season 3)
- Release: October 3, 1994 – June 28, 1998

Jim Henson's Animal Show is an American children's television series from the Jim Henson Company that aired from October 3, 1994, to June 28, 1998. The show premiered as part of The Fox Cubhouse for its first two seasons. The show later moved to Animal Planet with its third season released as early as February 18, 1998. As of 2026, the series is featured on the Yippee TV streaming service.

== Plot ==
Stinky the Skunk and Jake the Polar Bear host a talk show where they interview two different species of animals per show. Some episodes interview only one animal. The interviewees talk about themselves, as video clips are played of real animals of the same species.

== Episodes ==
=== Season One ===
1. "Cheetah & Gazelle" - A cheetah and a Thomson's gazelle join the show, with a focus on predatory habits and animal speed.
2. "Dolphin & "Fruit Bat" - A dolphin and a fruit bat join the show. Both animals use echo-location for navigation despite their very different habitats.
3. "Koala & Ostrich" - A koala and an ostrich join the show. While the koala is a fussy eater, ostriches will eat anything. They are also great mothers.
4. "Crocodile & Armadillo" - A crocodile and an armadillo join the show. Both animals have tough skin that works as a strong armor for defense from predators.
5. "Aardvark & Chameleon" - An aardvark and a chameleon join the show. These animals both have very long tongues that are used for eating, grooming, and protection.
6. "Elephant & Hunting Dog" - An elephant and a hunting dog join the show. Each animals works hard to stay cool as Stinky and Jake try to stay cool.
7. "Lion & Zebra" - A zebra and a lion join the show. These animals share a habitat, the African grasslands.
8. "Rattlesnake & Skunk" - A rattlesnake and extra special guest Stinky. Both animals are known throughout the animal kingdom for their defense mechanisms.
9. "Wildebeest & Sea Turtle" - A turtle and a wildebeest join the show. Both animals love to travel, migrating great distances each year.
10. "Shark & Sea Lion" - A shark and a sea lion join the show. These animals share the sea as their habitat.
11. "Rhino & Gorilla" - A rhinoceros and a gorilla join the show. This episode focuses on endangered species and conservation efforts to help save them as Stinky worries that he might be endangered.
12. "Sea Otter & Vulture" - A sea otter and a vulture join the show. Both use tools to help them survive.
13. "Owl & Octopus" - An owl and an octopus join the show. These animals have similar eyesight and both have beaks. Stinky even gives Jake some new glasses which makes it hard for him to see.
14. "Penguin & Kiwi" - A penguin and a kiwi join the show. Both birds are flightless.
15. "Giraffe & Sloth" - A giraffe and a sloth join the show. These animals have similar appetites - they think trees are delicious.
16. "Tiger & Tiger Beetle" - A tiger and a tiger beetle join the show. These animals are very ferocious.
17. "Raccoon & Polar Bear" - Jake is going to talk about polar bears. In all the excitement however, Jake forgot to invite another guest to come before him and Armstrong is dispatched to find him where he returns with a raccoon named Rhonda.
18. "Beaver & Spider" - A beaver and a spider join the show. Both animals are special because they make their own homes.
19. "Wolf & Baboon" - A wolf and a baboon join the show. These animals like to hang out and travel in groups.
20. "Kangaroo & Frog" - A kangaroo and a frog join the show. Both animals are known for hopping around.
21. "Walrus & Warthog" - A walrus and a warthog join the show. Though they live in very different environments, both animals have tusks.
22. "Grizzly Bear & Hedgehog" - A grizzly bear relative of Jake and a hedgehog join the show. Both animals get sleepy and need to hibernate.
23. "Gila Monster & Kangaroo Rat" - A Gila monster and a kangaroo rat join the show. These animals share a habitat, the desert.
24. "Bighorn Sheep & Red Deer" - A bighorn sheep and a red deer join the show. Both animals have horns or antlers.
25. "Badger & Rabbit" - A badger and a rabbit join the show. These animals both live in burrows.
26. "Manatee & Lemur" - A manatee and a lemur join the show. Even though they live in different habitats, both animals have strong and useful tails.

=== Season Two ===
1. "Chimpanzee & Hyena" - A chimpanzee and a hyena join the show. These animals like to spend time with their families. At the same time, Jake's Eurasian brown bear cousin Bunnie joins the show.
2. "Whale & Ant" - A whale and a soldier ant join the show. While the ant is one of the smallest creatures, the whale is one of the largest.
3. "Tarantula & Mole" - A tarantula and a mole join the show. Both animals like to make their home by burrowing as Stinky invites them into his burrow.
4. "Toad & Elephant Seal" - A toad and an elephant seal join the show. Each animals are known for the noises they make.
5. "Arctic Fox & Camel" - An Arctic fox and a camel join the show. Both animals are very good at adapting to changes in their environments. To help with the guests, Stinky has Bunnie work the thermostat.
6. "Hippopotamus & African Buffalo" - A hippopotamus and an african buffalo join the show. These animals are very dangerous to the point where Stinky drops a cage on himself and Jake for protection.
7. "Wasp & Blue-Footed Booby" - A wasp and a blue-footed booby join the show. Each animal is distinctly colored.
8. "Gemsbok & Moose" - A gemsbok and a moose join the show. Both animals have horns or antlers.
9. "Marine Iguana & Roadrunner" - An iguana and a roadrunner join the show. Both animals are really fast.
10. "Bison & Musk Ox" - A bison and a musk ox join the show. Each animals likes to travel in big herds.
11. "Orangutan & Potto" - An orangutan and a potto join the show. Both animals live in trees as Stinky has a tree to have them interview on.
12. "Stork & Shoebill" - A stork and a shoebill join the show. Both animals have large and useful beaks. Because of this, Armstrong leads Bunnie in exchanging hosting duties with Stinky and Jake to interview them.
13. "Wild Horse & Volcano Rabbit" - Today is Bunnie's birthday. A wild horse and a volcano rabbit join the show. Each animals is an endangered species and is being helped through conservation efforts.

=== Season Three ===
1. "Siberian Tiger & Reindeer" - A Siberian tiger and a reindeer join the show. Though these animals live in different parts of the world, they both like the cold.
2. "Crab & Snail" - A crab and a snail join the show. Though they look different, both animals have shells.
3. "Owl & Frog" - An owl and a frog join the show. Both are nocturnal.
4. "Indian Elephant & Human" - An Indian elephant and a human join the show. These animals often cooperate and work together in different ways.
5. "Pelican & Flamingo" - A pelican and a flamingo join the show. Each animals eats in a different way.
6. "Warthog & Baboon" - A warthog and a baboon join the show. Both animals live in the African brushlands and each travels in a group.
7. "Mouse" - A mouse joins the show. Stinky has the idea to throw a surprise party for the mouse, but mice don't like surprises when Stinky had invited an owl, a rattlesnake, and a red fox who know him.
8. "Monitor Lizard & Crocodile" - A monitor lizard and a crocodile join the show. Both animals have strong scales that help to protect their bodies.
9. "Albatross & Humming Bird" - An albatross and a humming bird join the show. Both birds are expert fliers even though they are very different in size.
10. "Humpback Whale" - A humpback whale joins the show. The biggest animal in the world stops by to talk about life in the ocean. However, the tank he is interviewed in has a leak and is starting to slowly flood the studio.
11. "Spider Monkey & Lemur" - A spider monkey and a lemur join the show. Both animals are like acrobats in the animal world; they spend their time swinging in trees.
12. "Honeybee & Honey Possum" - A honey bee and a honey possum join the show. Both animals depend on flowers to survive.
13. "Wasp & Ant" - A wasp and an ant join the show. These related insects talk about their life cycles.
14. "Coyote & Red Fox" - A coyote and a red fox join the show. It is Annoy Humans Day at The Animal Show and to celebrate, the coyote and fox share some insight on how to be a pest.
15. "Grasshopper Mouse & Stoat" - A grasshopper mouse and a stoat join the show. Despite their sizes these two animals are actually quite tough.
16. "Fish" - A fish joins the show. Stinky and Jake take an in-depth look at what it's like to be a fish as Stinky keeps naming possible fish.
17. "Pika & Chamois" - A pika and a chamois join the show. Even though they are very different, both animals live in the mountains.
18. "Bald Eagle" - Sam Eagle joins the show as a special guest where Jake wants to talk to him about actual bald eagles. Appalled after that moment, Sam leaves as Armstrong tries to get Jake to let him take Sam's place.
19. "Jaguar & Yellow-Footed Tortoise" - A jaguar and a yellow-footed tortoise join the show. Both animals are part of the same food chain.
20. "Spoonbill & Salmon" - A spoonbill and a salmon join the show. Both animals migrate despite their very different habitats.
21. "Colobus Monkey & Flying Squirrel" - A colobus monkey and a flying squirrel join the show. These two animals possess the ability to glide great distances and often appear to be flying.
22. "Rattlesnake" - A rattlesnake joins the show. The rattlesnake teaches Stinky and Jake about snakes.
23. "Hornbill & Woodpecker" - A hornbill and a woodpecker join the show. Both animals have beaks designed for specific behaviors.
24. "Giant Otter & Mink" - A giant otter and a mink join the show. These two animals are similar and are often mistaken for each other even though they live in different environments. Needing female friends, Bunnie befriends the two guests.
25. "Mongoose & Secretary Bird" - A mongoose and a secretary bird join the show. Both animals eat snakes. The mongoose ends up becoming a fixture around the show which annoys Stinky and Jake to the point where the mongoose argues with the secretary bird over who is the best snake-eater.
26. "Gorilla & Lion" - A gorilla and a lion join the show. These two animals live with their families.
