= List of The Jim Henson Company productions =

This is a list of films and TV series produced by The Jim Henson Company.

== Filmography ==
=== Films ===
Title	Release date	Production partners	Distributor
as Muppets Inc.
Time Piece	1965		Pathé Contemporary Films
The Cube	February 23, 1969		NBC
as Henson Associates
The Muppet Movie	June 22, 1979	ITC Entertainment	Associated Film Distribution (Note: The film's home media, TV, and digital distribution rights to The Muppet Movie and The Great Muppet Caper were purchased by The Jim Henson Company from ITC Entertainment in August 1984. The rights to the films were then acquired by Walt Disney Studios upon their parent company's acquisition of the Muppets franchise in 2004. Currently, Universal Pictures handles theatrical distribution—due to prior contractual obligations with the former Associated Film Distribution and ITC—but the ownership and copyrights to the films are controlled by Disney, with home media reissues of the film branded as a Walt Disney Pictures release.)
The Great Muppet Caper	June 22, 1981	ITC Entertainment	Universal Pictures (Note: The film's home media, TV, and digital distribution rights to The Dark Crystal were purchased by The Jim Henson Company from ITC Entertainment in August 1984. Currently, Universal Pictures handles theatrical distribution—due to prior contractual obligations with the former Associated Film Distribution and ITC.)
The Dark Crystal	December 17, 1982	ITC Entertainment	Universal Pictures
The Muppets Take Manhattan	July 13, 1984		TriStar Pictures (Note: The film's home media, TV, and digital distribution rights were not purchased by The Jim Henson Company from Walt Disney Studios upon their parent company's acquisition of the Muppets franchise in February 2004.)
Sesame Street Presents: Follow That Bird	August 2, 1985	Children's Television Workshop (Note: The Sesame Street Muppets only.)	Warner Bros. Pictures
Labyrinth	June 27, 1986	Lucasfilm	TriStar Pictures
as Jim Henson Productions
The Witches	August 24, 1990	Lorimar Film Entertainment	Warner Bros. Pictures
Jim Henson's Muppet*Vision 3D	May 16, 1991	Walt Disney Imagineering	Disney-MGM Studios; Walt Disney Attractions
The Muppet Christmas Carol	December 11, 1992	Walt Disney Pictures	Buena Vista Pictures Distribution
Gulliver's Travels	February 4, 1996	Hallmark Entertainment	NBC
Muppet Treasure Island	February 16, 1996	Walt Disney Pictures	Buena Vista Pictures Distribution
as Jim Henson Pictures
Buddy	June 6, 1997	Columbia Pictures; American Zoetrope	Sony Pictures Releasing
Muppets from Space	July 14, 1999	Columbia Pictures	Sony Pictures Releasing
The Adventures of Elmo in Grouchland	October 1, 1999	Columbia Pictures; Children's Television Workshop	Sony Pictures Releasing
Rat	October 6, 2000 (UK)		Universal Focus; Universal Pictures
Jack and the Beanstalk: The Real Story	December 2, 2001	Hallmark Entertainment	CBS
It's a Very Merry Muppet Christmas Movie	November 29, 2002	NBC Studios	NBC
Good Boy!	October 10, 2003	Metro-Goldwyn-Mayer	MGM Distribution Co. (USA/Canada); 20th Century Fox (International)
Five Children and It	October 15, 2004	Isle of Man Film Commission; Davis Films; UK Film Council; Endgame Entertainment	Capitol Films
Farscape: The Peacekeeper Wars	October 17, 2004	Hallmark Entertainment	Syfy
The Muppets' Wizard of Oz	May 20, 2005	The Muppets Holding Company (Note: After the Muppets' acquisition to Disney in 2005.); Fox Television Studios; Touchstone Television	ABC
MirrorMask	September 30, 2005	Destination Films	Samuel Goldwyn Films (USA); Tartan Films (UK)
as The Jim Henson Company
Unstable Fables: 3 Pigs and a Baby	March 4, 2008	Prana Animation Studios; Flame Ventures; The Weinstein Company	Genius Products
Unstable Fables: Tortoise vs. Hare	September 9, 2008	Prana Animation Studios; Flame Ventures; The Weinstein Company	Genius Products
Unstable Fables: The Goldilocks and the 3 Bears Show	December 16, 2008	Prana Animation Studios; Flame Ventures; The Weinstein Company	Genius Products
Sid the Science Kid: The Movie	March 25, 2013	Nine Eye Stone Productions	PBS; NCircle Entertainment
Alexander and the Terrible, Horrible, No Good, Very Bad Day	October 10, 2014	Walt Disney Pictures; 21 Laps Entertainment	Walt Disney Studios Motion Pictures
Lily the Unicorn	June 26, 2015	Amazon Studios	Amazon Prime Video
Turkey Hollow	November 21, 2015		Lifetime
The Star	November 17, 2017	Columbia Pictures; Sony Pictures Animation; Franklin Entertainment; Walden Media; Affirm Films	Sony Pictures Releasing
Dinosaur Train: Adventure Island	April 10, 2021	Universal 1440 Entertainment	PBS; Universal Pictures
Guillermo del Toro's Pinocchio	December 9, 2022	ShadowMachine; Netflix Animation; Double Dare You	Netflix
The Portable Door	April 7, 2023	Story Bridge Films	Madman Entertainment (Australia); Sky Cinema (UK); MGM+ (USA)
Jim Henson Idea Man	May 31, 2024	Imagine Documentaries; Diamond Docs; Fifth Season	Disney+
Alexander and the Terrible, Horrible, No Good, Very Bad Road Trip	March 28, 2025	Walt Disney Pictures; 21 Laps Entertainment	Disney+
Upcoming
Untitled Labyrinth sequel	TBA	TriStar Pictures; TriStar Productions	Sony Pictures Releasing
The Buried Giant	TBA	Netflix Animation Studios; ShadowMachine; Double Dare You!	Netflix

=== Television ===
Title	Creator(s) / Developer(s)	Release date	Production partners	Network
as Henson Associates, Inc.
The Muppet Show	Jim Henson	1976–81	Associated Television; ITC Entertainment	ITV (UK); Syndication (USA)
Fraggle Rock	Jim Henson	1983–87	CBC (Canada); HBO; Television South	CBC (Canada); HBO (USA); ITV (UK)
Muppet Babies	Jim Henson (d): Jeffrey Scott	1984–91	Marvel Productions	CBS
Little Muppet Monsters	Jim Henson	1985	Marvel Productions	CBS
Fraggle Rock: The Animated Series	Jim Henson (d): John Semper & Cynthia Friedlob	1987	Marvel Productions	NBC
as Jim Henson Productions, Inc.
The StoryTeller	Jim Henson (d): Anthony Minghella	1988–90	TVS	NBC (USA); Channel 4 (UK); HBO (USA) (Greek Myths)
The Jim Henson Hour	Jim Henson	1989		NBC
The Ghost of Faffner Hall	Tony Kysh	1989	Tyne Tees Television	ITV (UK)
Jim Henson's Mother Goose Stories		1990	Television South West	ITV (UK); The Disney Channel (USA)
Dinosaurs	Michael Jacobs; Bob Young (d): Jim Henson	1991–94	Michael Jacobs Productions; Walt Disney Television	ABC
Dog City	Jim Henson (d): Peter Sauder; J.D. Smith	1992–95	Nelvana Limited	Fox Kids (USA); YTV (Canada)
CityKids	Jeffrey Solomon	1993–94	The CityKids Foundation	ABC
Secret Life of Toys	Jocelyn Stevenson	1993		The Disney Channel (USA); BBC (UK)
Jim Henson's Animal Show		1994–98	Survival Anglia, Ltd.	Fox Kids (seasons 1–2); Animal Planet (season 3)
Muppets Tonight		1996–98		ABC; Disney Channel
Aliens in the Family	Andy Borowitz; Susan Borowitz	1996	The Stuffed Dog Company	ABC
The Wubbulous World of Dr. Seuss	Dr. Seuss	1996–98		Nickelodeon
as Jim Henson Television
Bear in the Big Blue House (Note: The Walt Disney Company acquired Bear in the Big Blue House from The Jim Henson Company in 2004. The transaction included all of the series' characters, television library, copyrights and trademarks.)	Mitchell Kriegman	1997-2003	Shadow Projects	Playhouse Disney
Brats of the Lost Nebula	Dan Clark	1998–99	Decode Entertainment; Wandering Monkey Entertainment	The WB (USA); YTV (Canada)
Mopatop's Shop	(d): Jocelyn Stevenson	1999–2003	Carlton Television	ITV (CITV)
Construction Site		1999–2003		ITV (CITV)
Farscape	Rockne S. O'Bannon	1999–2003	Hallmark Entertainment	Nine Network (Australia); Sci-Fi Channel (USA)
Family Rules	Russell Marcus	1999		UPN
The Fearing Mind	Billy Brown	2000–01	Angel/Brown Productions	Fox Family
The Hoobs	Jocelyn Stevenson; Brian Henson	2001–03	Decode Entertainment	Channel 4 (UK); TVOKids (Canada)
Telling Stories with Tomie dePaola	David Gumpel	2001		Hallmark Channel
Bambaloo	Donna Andrews; Justine Flynn	2002–03	Yoram Gross-EM.TV	Seven Network; ABC TV
Animal Jam (Note: Animal Jam was filmed on location at Disney-MGM Studios at Walt Disney World in Orlando, Florida)	John Derevlany	2003		TLC; Discovery Kids
as The Jim Henson Company
Frances (Note: Co-produced by The Jim Henson Company and HIT Entertainment. Both companies co-own the copyright.)	Russell Hoban (d): Alex Rockwell; Halle Stanford	2007	HIT Entertainment	
Sid the Science Kid		2008–13	KCET (2008–09); KOCE-TV (2010–12)	PBS Kids
Jim Henson's Pajanimals	Jeff Muncy and Alex Rockwell	2008–13	Sixteen South; John Doze Studios; Ingenious	PBS Kids Sprout
Dinosaur Train	Craig Bartlett	2009–20	Info-communications Media Development Authority; Sparky Animation; FableVision; Snee-Oosh, Inc. (uncredited); Tail Waggin' Productions	PBS Kids
Jim Henson's The Possibility Shop	Courtney Watkins	2009–11		
Hot Dog TV		2010		Cartoon Network
Me and My Monsters	Mark Grant; Claudia Lloyd (d): Rebecca De Souza	2010–11	Tiger Aspect Productions; Sticky Pictures	Network Ten (Australia); CBBC (UK)
Wilson & Ditch: Digging America	Joe Purdy; Craig Bartlett	2010–12		pbskidsgo.org
That Puppet Game Show	Jamie Ormerod	2013–14	BBC Entertainment	BBC One
Jim Henson's Creature Shop Challenge		2014		Syfy
The Doozers	Larry Jacobs; Bill Gordon	2014–18	DHX Studios Halifax	Hulu (USA); Kids' CBC (Canada)
Hi Opie!	Barbara Slade	2014–16	MarbleMedia	TVO Kids
Dot.	Randi Zuckerberg	2016–18	Industrial Brothers	CBC Kids (Canada); Universal Kids (US)
Splash and Bubbles	John Tartaglia	2016–18	Herschend Studios	PBS Kids
Word Party	Alex Rockwell	2016–21		Netflix
Julie's Greenroom	Julie Andrews; Emma Walton Hamilton; Judy Rothman	2017		Netflix
The Dark Crystal: Age of Resistance	Jim Henson (characters) (d): Jeffrey Addiss; Will Matthews	2019		Netflix
Fraggle Rock: Rock On!		2020		Apple TV+
Earth to Ned		2020–21	Marwar Junction Productions	Disney+
Duff's Happy Fun Bake Time	Duff Goldman	2021		Discovery+
Harriet the Spy	Will McRobb	2021–23	Postworks New York; Wellsville Pictures; Titmouse, Inc.	Apple TV+
Fraggle Rock: Back to the Rock	Jim Henson (original series) (d): Matt Fusfeld; Alex Cuthbertson	2022-24	New Regency; Fusfeld & Cuthbertson Regional Entertainment	Apple TV+
Slumberkins	Alex Rockwell	2022	Factory	Apple TV+
Upcoming
Lore Olympus	Rachel Smythe	TBA	Webtoon; Amazon MGM Studios	Prime Video
The Storyteller	Jim Henson (original series)	TBA	Fremantle	TBA

== Other ==
=== As a contributor ===
- The Tonight Show (1955–61)
- The Jimmy Dean Show (1963–66)
- Sesame Street (in-credited from season 1, onwards (1969–present))
- Saturday Night Live (Season 1)
  - "The Land of Gorch" segments (1975–76)
- Five Minutes More (2006)
- The High Fructose Adventures of Annoying Orange (2012–14)

=== TV specials ===
- Hey, Cinderella! (1969)
- The Great Santa Claus Switch (1970)
- The Frog Prince (1971)
- The Muppet Musicians of Bremen (1972)
- Out to Lunch (1974)
- The Muppets Valentine Show (1974)
- The Muppet Show: Sex and Violence (1975)
- Emmet Otter's Jug-Band Christmas (1977)
- The Muppets Go Hollywood (1979)
- John Denver and the Muppets: A Christmas Together (1979)
- The Muppets Go to the Movies (1981)
- Of Muppets and Men (1981)
- The Fantastic Miss Piggy Show (1982)
- Rocky Mountain Holiday (1983)
- The Muppets: A Celebration of 30 Years (1986)
- The Tale of the Bunny Picnic (1986)
- The Christmas Toy (1986)
- A Muppet Family Christmas (1987)
- Sesame Street... 20 Years & Still Counting (1989)
- The Muppets at Walt Disney World (1990)
- The Muppets Celebrate Jim Henson (1990)
- Mr. Willowby's Christmas Tree (1995)
- Wowsabout (2026)

=== Direct-to-video ===
- Jim Henson Play-Along Video (1988)
  - Hey, You're as Funny as Fozzie Bear: A Comedy Show Starring Fozzie Bear and You
  - Mother Goose Stories: Miss Muffet, Songs of Sixpence, Little Boy Blue (1987–1990)
  - Neat Stuff... To Know and Do
  - Peek-A-Boo, A Big Surprise for Little People
  - Sing-Along, Dance-Along, Do-Along: Rowlf teaches kids about music
  - Wow, You're a Cartoonist!
- Muppet Sing Alongs
  - Billy Bunny's Animal Songs (1993)
  - It's Not Easy Being Green (1994)
  - Muppet Treasure Island Sing Along (1996)
  - Things That Fly (1996)
- Muppet Classic Theater (1994)
- Jim Henson's Preschool Collection (1995)
  - Mother Goose Stories: Humpty Dumpty
  - Mother Goose Stories: Mary Had a Little Lamb
  - Muppets on Wheels
  - Yes, I Can Be a Friend
  - Yes, I Can Learn
  - Yes, I Can Help
- Kermit's Swamp Years (2002)

=== Web content ===
- The Skrumps (2007)
- The Sam Plenty Cavalcade of Action Show Plus Singing! (2008)
- Monster Dance (2026)

=== Henson Alternative ===
The following list contains projects of The Jim Henson Company under its Henson Alternative banner.

=== Movies ===
Title	Release date	Production partners	Distributor
The Happytime Murders	August 24, 2018	STX Films; H. Brothers; Black Bear Pictures; TMP; On the Day Productions	STX Entertainment

=== Television series ===
The first eight series are produced under its Henson Alternative banner exclusively in North America before premiering worldwide in 2015.

- Tinseltown (2007)
- Alt/Reality (2010–2011)
- Simian Undercover Detective Squad (2012)
- Late Night Buffet with Augie and Del (2006)
- Del's Vegas Comedy Binge (2007)
- Late Night Liars (2010)
- Marvin E. Quasniki for President (2011–12)
- Neil's Puppet Dreams (2012–13)
- Ketchup with the Hot Dogs (2013–14)
- Good Morning Today (2013–14)
- No, You Shut Up! (2013–2016)
- The Curious Creations of Christine McConnell (2018)
- The Miskreants (2019–2020)

=== Stage shows ===
- Puppet Up! - Uncensored (2005–present)
  - Stuffed and Unstrung (2010–2013)

=== Other productions ===
- The Muppet segments of the Nintendo Digital Event, shown during E3 (2015).
- Star Fox Zero commercial (2016).
