= Bonnie Erickson =

American designer

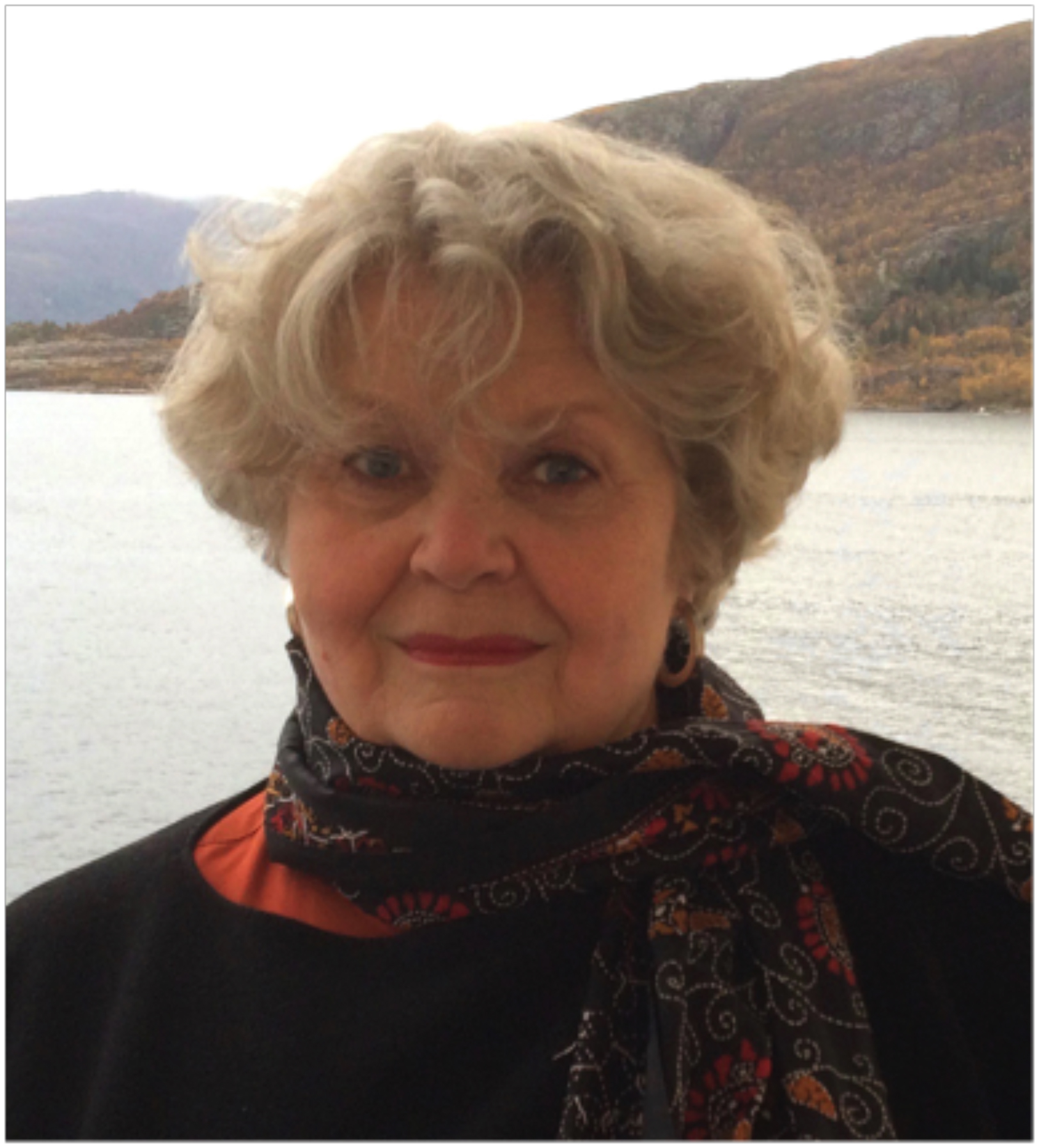
- Born: September 20, 1941 (age 85); Anoka, Minnesota, U.S.
- Education: University of Minnesota, Art Students League of New York
- Occupations: designer of puppets, costumes, toys, and graphics
- Spouses: Leslie Lewis (m. 1963–1975) Wayde Harrison (m. 1977)
- Children: Christopher Wisedell Lewis

Bonnie Erickson (born September 20, 1941) is an American designer of puppets, costumes, toys, and graphics, best known for her work with Jim Henson and The Muppets, where her most notable creations include Miss Piggy, Statler and Waldorf, and as a partner in Harrison/Erickson; the Major League Baseball mascot the Phillie Phanatic.

== Biography ==
=== Jim Henson Company and The Muppets ===
Erickson began her career with a background in theater and art, having studied at the University of Minnesota and the Art Students League of New York. After working in legitimate theater as assistant to costume designer Patricia Quinn Stewart, she was hired by Jim Henson in 1970 to provide costumes for the Muppet characters in The Frog Prince. She continued with the company, specializing in puppets made from carved foam like Miss Piggy and Statler and Waldorf.

Erickson served as Head of the Muppet Workshop for Jim Henson Associates, and set up the original London workshop for The Muppet Show in 1976.

In 1983, Erickson served as Design Consultant and Workshop Director for the Jim Henson series Fraggle Rock.

In 1986, Erickson returned to The Jim Henson Company as Vice President of Creative Projects in which she worked on productions such as The Tale of the Bunny Picnic and The Christmas Toy.

Erickson served as a Creative Director for the product division of The Jim Henson Company and Children's Television Workshop from 1987 to 2000. Among the many products she art directed was the popular children's toy Tickle Me Elmo.

=== Harrison/Erickson, Inc. ===
In 1977, she and husband Wayde Harrison established Harrison/Erickson, Inc., a design studio and marketing resource for national sports teams, television production and the advertising and toy industries, with Jim Henson Associates becoming one of their first clients.

Erickson designed many professional sports mascots, including the Phillie Phanatic and Youppi!, both displayed in the National Baseball Hall of Fame and Museum.

Harrison and Erickson are trustees of The Strong Museum of Play.

In addition to domestic commercials, Harrison, Erickson, Inc. produced designs and provided production casting and performance for international clients in France, Germany, Mexico, Switzerland, and Japan. A series of Budweiser Taste Bud ads were created by Erickson exclusively for Saturday Night Live. She created characters for both Burger King and McDonald’s and created the first talking Happy Meal.

=== The Jim Henson Legacy ===
In 1994, Erickson became a trustee of the Jim Henson Legacy, a nonprofit organization dedicated to preserving and perpetuating Jim Henson's contributions to the worlds of puppetry, television, motion pictures, special effects and media technology. From 2007 to 2010, she served as president, and then executive director until 2014. During her tenure, she oversaw the Henson Family donation of objects from Henson productions to the Smithsonian Institution, Center for Puppetry Arts, Museum of the Moving Image, The Strong National Museum of Play, and Museum of Pop Culture.

Erickson was also instrumental in the installation of a statue of Jim Henson and Kermit the Frog at the University of Maryland. The caricature Muppet of Jim Henson she created inspired the Jim Henson Legacy commemorative action figure by Palisades Toys.

== Live theater ==
Erickson's work has been featured in The Warrior Ant, a multimedia production for The Next Wave Festival at the Brooklyn Academy of Music in New York in 1988, and in the nationwide Bette Midler The Divine Miss Millennium Tour in 1999.

In 2012, Erickson oversaw "Jim Henson's Musical World," a two-night concert at Carnegie Hall featuring the New York Pops and characters from The Muppets, Sesame Street, and Fraggle Rock.

== Erickson's credits ==
=== The Muppets ===
Year	Character(s)	Production	Designer	Builder
1972	Caleb Siles, Mean Floyd, Mordecai Sledge, and Lardpork	The Muppet Musicians of Bremen	Yes	Yes
1973	Jim Henson, Frank Oz, and Jerry Nelson caricature puppets	The Dick Cavett Show	Yes	Yes
1974	George the Janitor	The Muppets Valentine Show	Yes	Yes
1974	Mildred Huxtetter	The Muppets Valentine Show	Yes	No
1974	Miss Piggy	The Muppet Show: Sex and Violence	Yes	Yes
1974	Statler and Waldorf	The Muppet Show: Sex and Violence	Yes	Yes
1974	The Muppet Newsman	The Muppet Show: Sex and Violence	Yes	Yes
1974	Dr. Julius Strangepork (originally “Dr. Nauga”)	The Muppet Show: Sex and Violence	Yes	Yes
1974	Gene Shalit caricature puppet	The Muppet Show: Sex and Violence	Yes	Yes
1974	Zoot	The Muppet Show: Sex and Violence	Yes	No
1974	Animal	The Muppet Show: Sex and Violence	Yes (co-designed with Jim Henson)	No
1974	Janice	The Muppet Show: Sex and Violence	No	Yes
1974	The Swedish Chef	The Muppet Show: Sex and Violence	No	Yes (co-built with Jim Henson)
1975	Vazh from The Land of Gorch	Saturday Night Live	No	Yes
1976	Fozzie Bear	The Muppet Show	No	Yes
1983	Espinete	Barrio Sésamo	No	Yes
1983	Kippi Ben Kippod	Rechov Sumsum	No	Yes

=== Mascots ===
Mascot	Team/company	Years active	Image
Phillie Phanatic	Philadelphia Phillies	1978-present	
Youppi!	Montreal Expos/Canadiens	2005-present	
Sharpo	Sharp Electronics	1979-1982	
Big Shot	Philadelphia 76ers	1979-1996	
Hoops	Philadelphia 76ers	1979-1983	
Dandy	New York Yankees	1979-1981	
Ribbie and Roobarb	Chicago White Sox	1981-1990	
Duncan the Dragon	New Jersey Nets	1982-1991	
Hugo	Charlotte Hornets	1988-present	
K.C. Wolf	Kansas City Chiefs	1989-present	
Booster	Houston Rockets	1989-1993	
Stuff the Magic Dragon	Orlando Magic	1989-present	
Pirate Pete	Delaware River & Bridge Authority	1995-present	
Slyly	Hiroshima Toyo Carp	1995-present	
Jaxson de Ville	Jacksonville Jaguars	1996-present	
G-Wiz	Washington Wizards	1997-present	
Phred	Philadelphia Phillies	2000-present	

=== Advertising clients ===
- American Dairy Association
- AT&T
- Budweiser
- Burger King
- Cadbury
- Flik Flak (Switzerland)
- H-O Oats
- La Pie qui Chante (France)
- Lysol
- McDonald's
- Nutella
- Perwoll (Germany)
- Procter & Gamble
- Sharp Corporation

=== Toy and product manufacturer clients ===
- Applause, Inc.
- Axlon
- Enesco
- Fisher-Price
- Hasbro
- Knickerbocker Toy Company
- Colorforms for Maurice Sendak
- Mattel
- Kurt S. Adler
