= Caroly Wilcox =

American puppeteer (1931–2021)

- Caroly Wilcox, from Halcyon, the 1952 Swarthmore College yearbook
- Born: Carolyn Wilcox; May 16, 1931; Washington, District of Columbia, U.S.
- Died: January 9, 2021 (aged 89); New York City, U.S.
- Occupations: Puppeteer, theatrical designer
- Parent: Clair Wilcox (father)

Carolyn Wilcox (May 16, 1931 – January 9, 2021), known as Caroly Wilcox, was an American theatre professional, best known for her work with the Muppets, on television programs including Sesame Street, The Muppet Show, and Fraggle Rock, and in The Muppet Movie, The Muppets Take Manhattan, and other films.

== Early life ==
Carolyn Wilcox was the younger daughter of Clair Wilcox and Florence Ruth Chapman Wilcox. She was a birthright Quaker, as registered with the Swarthmore Monthly Meeting. Her father was economics professor at Swarthmore College. Her mother, a clubwoman and art teacher, died in 1954. While at Swarthmore, Wilcox chaired the Swarthmore Folk Festival in 1949, with John Jacob Niles and Woody Guthrie as the featured performers, and she designed the set for a theatrical production in 1951. She graduated from Swarthmore in 1952; in the yearbook, Halcyon, the phrase "I left the n off on purpose... caroly" is printed with her picture.

== Career ==
Wilcox was a folk singer as a young woman, a member of a trio called The Samplers, with whom she made a record (The Samplers In Person, 1961). She appeared in the Broadway show The Next President in 1958, danced in a Brooklyn lecture-demonstration in 1963, and worked on a Pickwick Puppet Theater production in Boston in 1970.

Wilcox began working with the Muppets in 1969, and was director of the New York Muppet workshop. She designed, built, and performed characters for Sesame Street, including the Yip-Yips and an early version of Elmo, from its launch in 1969 until her retirement in 2012. She also worked on The Muppet Show (1976–1981), Emmet Otter's Jug-Band Christmas (1977), and Fraggle Rock (1983–1987), and Put Down the Duckie (1988). Her film credits included The Muppet Movie (1979), The Great Muppet Caper (1981), The Muppets Take Manhattan (1984), and Follow That Bird (1985). She served on the board of directors of the Jim Henson Foundation. Wilcox was part of the creative teams nominated for Emmy Awards in 1976 and 1980, and the Sesame Street team that won a Daytime Emmy in 1990, for costume design.

Wilcox taught puppetry workshops in the theatre program at New York University, and at other schools. In 2020, Wilcox appeared with fellow Jim Henson colleagues Bonnie Erickson and Rollie Krewson in an online interview hosted by the Museum of the Moving Image.

== Personal life and death ==
Wilcox died on January 9, 2021, aged 89.
