= The Muppets Go to the Movies =

1981 TV Special

- Genre: Family film Television special
- Created by: Henson Associates; Marble Arch Productions
- Based on: The Muppets by Jim Henson
- Written by: Jim Henson; Jerry Juhl; Chris Langham
- Directed by: Peter Harris
- Starring: Dudley Moore; Lily Tomlin; Muppet performers: Jim Henson; Frank Oz; Jerry Nelson; Richard Hunt; Dave Goelz; Steve Whitmire; Louise Gold
- Music by: Larry Grossman; Jack Parnell; Derek Scott
- Country of origin: United States
- Original language: English

Production
- Producer: Jim Henson
- Editor: John Hawkins
- Running time: 49 minutes
- Production company: Marble Arch Productions

Original release
- Network: ABC
- Release: May 20, 1981

The Muppets Go to the Movies is a one-hour television special starring Jim Henson's Muppets. It first aired May 20, 1981 on ABC as promotion for The Great Muppet Caper, which was released in the United States a month later.

== Plot ==
With the aid of Dudley Moore and Lily Tomlin, Kermit the Frog and the Muppets show spoofs of different movies at the Muppet Theatre.

- The special opens with a 20th Century Frog logo. The Announcer (Jerry Nelson) provides an introduction over clips from the special.
- Kermit comes onstage to introduce the show, informing the audience that the Muppets plan on paying tribute to some of their favorite movies.
- The Muppet company perform "Hey, a Movie!" from The Great Muppet Caper.
- Fozzie Bear introduces a spoof of The Three Musketeers. Statler and Waldorf attempt to leave, but are stopped by elastic ropes tied around their ankles. Gonzo the Great, Scooter and Link Hogthrob play Athos, Porthos and Gummo, out to defeat The Scarlet Pimpernel. Link flies on a chandelier, thus landing him backstage, and onto Miss Piggy, who reacts with her famous karate chop, thus sending him flying back onstage, and onto Kermit during an introduction for the next parody.
- The sketch Invasion of the Unpleasant Things from Outer Space has Dudley Moore and Lily Tomlin facing giant alien rats. In addition to sci-fi films, the parody also pokes fun at international cinema. Moore speaks in a foreign language, accompanied by English subtitles.
- Janice introduces her favorite film The Wizard of Oz. She mentions that she likes the Land of Oz and might move there. When Janice is about to mention the part of Dorothy Gale, Piggy's voice is heard saying "I'm not ready." Janice attempts to fill in, but Piggy arrives just in time. As the scene begins, Piggy (as Dorothy) and Foo-Foo (as Toto) start out in black and white. Piggy sings "Somewhere Over the Rainbow". When it changes to color, she is joined by Scooter as the Scarecrow, Gonzo as the Tin Man, and Fozzie Bear as the Cowardly Lion in a rendition of "If I Only Had a Brain/a Heart/the Nerve" and "We're Off to See the Wizard".
- Gonzo introduces Metro-Goldwyn-Bear's The Fool of the Roman Empire. Moore portrays a jazz piano-playing Julius Caesar. Moore plays a bit of Pomp and Circumstance on the piano, while Gonzo, Beauregard and Lew Zealand have a chariot race. Gonzo's chariot is pulled by a chicken, Beauregard's by rats, and Lew's by a shark.
- Backstage, Rizzo complains to Kermit about the previous sketch, claiming that it was an insult to rats. Rizzo and his rat buddies try to convince Kermit to put them in a glamorous rat production number. Kermit tells the rats that the Muppets have already done a similar production number in The Great Muppet Caper, showing a clip, featuring "The First Time It Happens".
- Lily Tomlin attempts to flirt with Kermit, but Piggy interrupts them. Kermit suggests that Tomlin introduce the horror genre. Despite Tomlin's insistence that she's not a fan, she's attacked by a group of Muppet monsters. In J. Arthur Link's The Nephew of Frankenstein, Fozzie visits his uncle (played by Dr. Julius Strangepork) who is working on a comedian monster (played by Mulch). They attempt to do a "Hot Cross Bunnies" joke. The experiment blows Mulch up and burns the film screen. Firefighters are called, but joke that they are unable to put out a fire that was caused in the 19th century as "our hoses won't reach!". The segment ends with Kermit parodying Porky Pig's "That's all folks!" line.
- Rowlf the Dog presents a silent film featuring Kermit and Sopwith the Camel. Mulch drops in, finally getting the "Hot Cross Bunnies" joke.
- Sam the Eagle comes to translate a film by famed Swedish filmmaker Ingmar Bergman. Floyd Pepper informs Sam that the film isn't by Ingmar, but by his brother Gummo. The film Silent Strawberries parodies Bergman's filmography. It features The Swedish Chef, Beaker (as "The Angel of Death"), Fozzie and Kermit. As the film is not in English, Sam has to translate. Much to Sam's disgust, the translations make absolutely no sense. The film ends with a rendition of "Hooray for Hollywood". Waldorf claims he doesn't believe in "The Angel of Death", but is automatically frightened by someone over his shoulder (a popcorn girl).
- A spoof of Casablanca: Kermit bids his goodbyes to Piggy among the harsh wind of an airplane.
- Backstage, Floyd and Janice sing "Act Naturally".
- Dudley Moore tells the audience about his love for artistic French films. He then explains that because of this fondness, he asked the Muppets not to parody them, but instead to do a "tasteless tribute to the Western". In Tantamount Picture's Small in the Saddle, a couple of cowboys, their horses, two outlaws, and the outlaws' cows sing "Ragtime Cowboy Joe." Lew shows up paddling a boat. Much to Statler's shock, Waldorf has apparently turned into a cow.
- Kermit introduces a spoof of Tarzan with Gonzo as Tarzan and Lily Tomlin as Jane.
- Backstage, Kermit tells Beauregard that it is time for his tribute to the Hollywood stuntman. A clip, featuring Beauregard driving Kermit, Fozzie and Gonzo in a taxi is shown.
- Kermit introduces the next musical number: Piggy performs "Heat Wave" in the style of Marilyn Monroe and is backed up by a penguin chorus.
- Backstage, Kermit congratulates Piggy on her performance. Piggy wants everyone to see what a great performer Kermit is, by showing a Fred Astaire tribute that he did in The Great Muppet Caper, succeeded by a clip, featuring the song "Steppin' Out with a Star". Afterwards, Statler does his own "tap dance" routine.
- In Goon with the Wind, Dudley Moore and Piggy portray Rhett and Scarlett as they watch a fire in the background. The sketch is interrupted by the firefighters from earlier on. Statler and Waldorf decide to give the sketch three big cheers. Three big chairs are thrown at the two.
- An introduction by Lew Zealand leads into Cholesterol Pictures' A Frog Too Far, starring Kermit as a World War II air force pilot and Tomlin playing various love interests.
- The full company performs "We'll Meet Again".

During the credits, the Muppets leave the Muppet Theatre as Kermit secures the stage door, unaware that he has locked Dudley Moore and Lily Tomlin in.

== Notes ==
- The same sets from The Muppet Show are used for this special.
- Later syndicated alongside The Muppet Show.
- This is the first time a camera shot of the entrance to the Muppet Theatre is shown at the end of the special.
- Taped between March 9 and 17 of 1981.

== Muppet performers ==
- Jim Henson as Kermit the Frog, Rowlf the Dog, Link Hogthrob, The Swedish Chef, Waldorf, and Gladiator Pig
- Frank Oz as Miss Piggy, Fozzie Bear, Animal, and Sam the Eagle
- Jerry Nelson as Floyd Pepper, Lew Zealand, Mulch, Dr. Julius Strangepork, Pops, Announcer, Deputy, Gladiator Pig, Firefighter, and Rat
- Richard Hunt as Scooter, Janice, Beaker, Statler, Sheriff, Rat, and Cow
- Dave Goelz as Gonzo the Great, Beauregard, Joe, Firefighter, Trumpet Blower, Rat, and Horse
- Steve Whitmire as Rizzo the Rat, The Scarlet Pimpernel, Jed, Firefighter, and Horse
- Louise Gold as Popcorn Girl

Additional Muppets performed by Kathryn Mullen, Brian Muehl, Bob Payne, and Rollie Krewson.
