= Jim Henson Pictures =

Former film studio from 1995 to 2004

- Type: Subsidiary
- Industry: Film production
- Founded: July 21, 1995; 31 years ago
- Founder: Brian Henson
- Defunct: 2004; 22 years ago
- Fate: Partnership ended
- Successor: The Jim Henson Company; The Muppets Studio
- Key people: Lisa Henson; Martin G. Baker
- Owner: The Jim Henson Company; Sony Pictures Entertainment (1995–1999)

Jim Henson Pictures, Inc. was an American film studio owned by The Jim Henson Company and led by Brian and Lisa Henson, the oldest son and daughter, respectively, of Muppets creator Jim Henson. It was originally founded on July 21, 1995, by Brian as a joint venture between Jim Henson Productions and Sony Pictures Entertainment.

The studio closed in 2004 after the partnership ended with Brian Henson and Sony Pictures.

== History ==
Jim Henson Pictures was founded in 1995 by Brian Henson as the joint venture between Sony Pictures Entertainment and The Jim Henson Company.

== Productions ==
Title	Release date	Production partners	Distributor	Budget	Box office
Buddy	June 6, 1997	Columbia Pictures; American Zoetrope	Sony Pictures Releasing	$19 million	$10.1 million
Muppets from Space	July 14, 1999	Columbia Pictures	Sony Pictures Releasing	$24 million	$22.3 million
The Adventures of Elmo in Grouchland	October 1, 1999	Columbia Pictures; Children's Television Workshop	Sony Pictures Releasing	$26 million	$11.7 million
Rat	October 6, 2000 (United Kingdom)	Universal Pictures	Universal Focus	N/A	$2,630
Good Boy!	October 10, 2003	Metro-Goldwyn-Mayer	MGM Distribution Co. (United States/Canada); 20th Century Fox (International)	$18 million	$45.3 million
Five Children and It	October 15, 2004 (United Kingdom); October 20, 2004 (France); July 5, 2005 (United States)	Isle of Man Film Commission; Davis Films; UK Film Council; Endgame Entertainment	Pathé Distribution (United Kingdom); Warner Home Video (United States); Metropolitan Filmexport (France); Capitol Films (international)	N/A	$2.3 million
MirrorMask	January 25, 2005 (Sundance); September 30, 2005 (United States); March 3, 2006 (United Kingdom)	Destination Films	Samuel Goldwyn Films	$4 million	$973,613

== See also ==
- List of The Jim Henson Company productions
