= David Odell =

American screenwriter and film director (1943–2026)

- Born: David Bingham Odell; July 8, 1943; Chicago, Illinois, U.S.
- Died: August 27, 2026 (aged 83); Santa Monica, California, U.S.
- Occupations: Film director, screenwriter
- Spouse: Annette Duffy

David Bingham Odell (July 8, 1943 – August 27, 2026) was an American screenwriter and film director.

Odell was nominated in 1980 for an Emmy for Outstanding Writing in a Variety or Music Program for The Muppet Show alongside Jim Henson, Don Hinkley, and Jerry Juhl. He won the award the following year with co-nominees Jerry Juhl and Chris Langham.

Odell died in Santa Monica, California on August 27, 2026, at the age of 83.

== Filmography ==
- Cry Uncle! (1971)
- Between Time and Timbuktu (with Fred Barzyk and David R. Loxton) (1972) (TV)
- Dealing: Or the Berkeley-to-Boston Forty-Brick Lost-Bag Blues (with Paul Williams) (1972)
- The Muppet Show (1979–1981) (TV)
- The Muppet Movie (with Jack Burns and Jerry Juhl) (1979) (uncredited)
- Running Scared (1980)
- The Dark Crystal (1982)
- Nate and Hayes (with John Hughes) (1983)
- Supergirl (1984)
- Masters of the Universe (1987)
- Tales from the Darkside (1987) (TV)
- Monsters (1988–1990) (TV)
- Martians Go Home (1989) (Director)
