= Dave Goelz =

American puppeteer (born 1946)

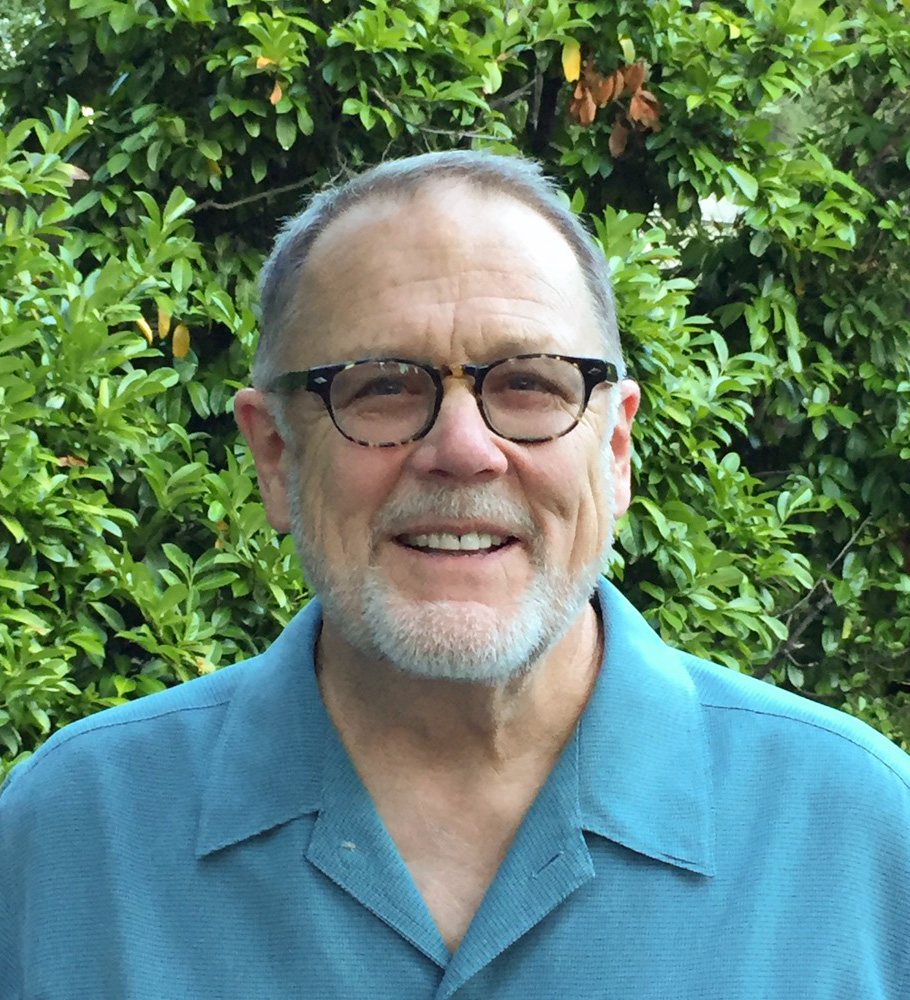
- Goelz in 2018
- Born: David Charles Goelz; July 16, 1946 (age 80); Los Angeles, California, U.S.
- Occupations: Puppeteer; puppet builder; actor
- Years active: 1961; 1973–present
- Spouse: Debra Goelz (m. 1992)
- Children: 2

David Charles Goelz (/ˈɡoʊlz/ born July 16, 1946) is an American puppeteer and actor. He is known for his work with the Muppets, performing the characters Gonzo the Great, Dr. Bunsen Honeydew, Beauregard, Zoot, and Waldorf.

He joined Jim Henson's Muppet team in 1973 and has remained a key performer in many Muppet productions, including The Muppet Show, Fraggle Rock, and various movies and television specials. He is currently the last remaining original Muppet performer.

== Early life ==
Goelz was born on July 16, 1946 in Los Angeles, California. He had a childhood interest in puppetry, fascinated by the children's television shows Howdy Doody and Time for Beany. After graduating from John Burroughs High School in Burbank, he attended the Los Angeles Art Center College of Design, beginning his career as an industrial designer. He applied to work at Walt Disney Imagineering, but was not considered on the basis that they had sufficient industrial designers already employed.

Goelz went on to work for companies such as John Deere, American Airlines, and Hewlett-Packard. During this time, he regularly viewed episodes of Sesame Street, fascinated with the design process behind the Muppet characters, costumes, and performances, leading him to wonder about the creators behind them.

As a child, Goelz appeared as an extra in the 1961 Disney film The Parent Trap.

== Career ==
=== 1972–1975: Early career ===
In 1972, Goelz attended a workshop conducted by Frank Oz at the Puppeteers of America National Convention in Oakland, California. One month later, following an invitation from Oz, Goelz attended daily tapings of Sesame Street during a work trip to Pennsylvania. During his visit, he brought three puppets he had recently built. Impressed by his work, Bonnie Erickson, former head of the Muppet workshop, recommended that Goelz meet Jim Henson. Months later, he was able to present his design portfolio to Henson, ultimately receiving a job offer with Henson Associates as a part-time puppet builder. His assignment was to build puppets and design effects for a proposed Broadway stage play. However, the show was soon abandoned in order to produce the ABC pilot The Muppets Valentine Show.

Upon returning to California, Goelz had been replaced by his electronics employer. He then set up his own shop, creating puppets and producing videos for industrial clients. Eight months later, in the fall of 1974, Henson offered a full-time position as a designer and puppet builder, and occasional performer in specials, while allowing him to retain his main industrial clients.

Returning to New York, Goelz began work on The Muppet Show: Sex and Violence, where he built the puppets Nigel, Animal, Floyd Pepper, and Zoot, the latter becoming his first major character.

=== 1976–1982: The Muppet Show and Gonzo ===
In 1976, Goelz traveled to London to begin work on The Muppet Show. In addition to reprising the role of Zoot, he was promoted to principal Muppet performer with the starring role of The Great Gonzo. The puppet previously debuted in The Great Santa Claus Switch as Cigar Box Frackle and had made brief appearances in the Muppet Meeting Films and Herb Alpert & the Tijuana Brass, under different performers. Despite this promotion, he was still employed in the Muppet workshop.

Goelz recalled the hectic schedule of working full-time behind the scenes and in front of the cameras, describing his typical day as involving running back and forth between making puppets and performing. He admitted that he did not know anything about performing at the time and had no training for it. At the end of the first season, he asked Henson if he could return the following year solely as a performer, to which Henson agreed.

During the first season of the show, Gonzo was still being developed. Initially, Goelz was concerned about finding the right voice for the character. He conceived the voice on the morning of the first taping. He later recalled that he believed he had the weakest voice among the Muppet performers and felt anxious about singing for the first time.

Goelz viewed Gonzo as a misfit and out of place, mirroring his own feelings as a performer. The early design of Gonzo featured a permanently sad expression, which influenced him to give the character a similarly depressed demeanor. He described the character's downcast eyes as initially making him easier to play, reflecting his own feelings of being an impostor in show business and learning to perform and puppeteer on the job.

At times, Goelz's portrayal of the character steered more comedic. He ultimately began to feel limited by Gonzo's droopy eyelids, which made it difficult to convey excitement and limited the character's emotions. After the first season, he asked Henson if he could build a Gonzo puppet with an eye mechanism, to which Henson agreed. He returned to New York to make the modifications, allowing Gonzo to convey his excitement and enthusiasm more effectively. Gonzo's character evolved from a nervous, depressed failure to a manic, confident stuntman. Other facets of the character, such as his romantic fascination with poultry, were introduced in the second season.

In addition to the starring role of Gonzo, Goelz also performed Zoot, the saxophone player for the Electric Mayhem, and scientist Dr. Bunsen Honeydew. In later seasons, he introduced a new character, Beauregard, the slow-witted backstage janitor.

=== 1983–1999: Fraggle Rock and Henson's death ===
In 1983, Goelz was cast in Fraggle Rock as Boober Fraggle. He also performed Uncle Traveling Matt, Philo, and the World's Oldest Fraggle, as well as a variety of guests and incidental characters.

Goelz also worked on Henson's forays into the fantasy genre, performing skekUng and Fizzgig in The Dark Crystal and Sir Didymus in Labyrinth. In 1986, he played Rugby Tiger in The Christmas Toy, later reprising the role in Secret Life of Toys. In 1989, he performed Digit in The Jim Henson Hour.

Following Henson's death in 1990, Goelz's role as Gonzo gained increased prominence, beginning with The Muppet Christmas Carol where he portrayed Gonzo as Charles Dickens. In 1992, he began performing Waldorf, succeeding Henson in the role. For Muppets Tonight, he introduced the characters Randy Pig and Bill the Bubble Guy. Gonzo's role in Muppets from Space marked his first leading role in a Muppet production.

Goelz puppeteered the face of Earl Sinclair in Dinosaurs during the show's first two seasons. From 1996 to 1998, he performed Stinky the Skunk in Jim Henson's Animal Show and Humongous Chicken in the 1999 film The Adventures of Elmo in Grouchland.

=== 2000–present: Continued career ===
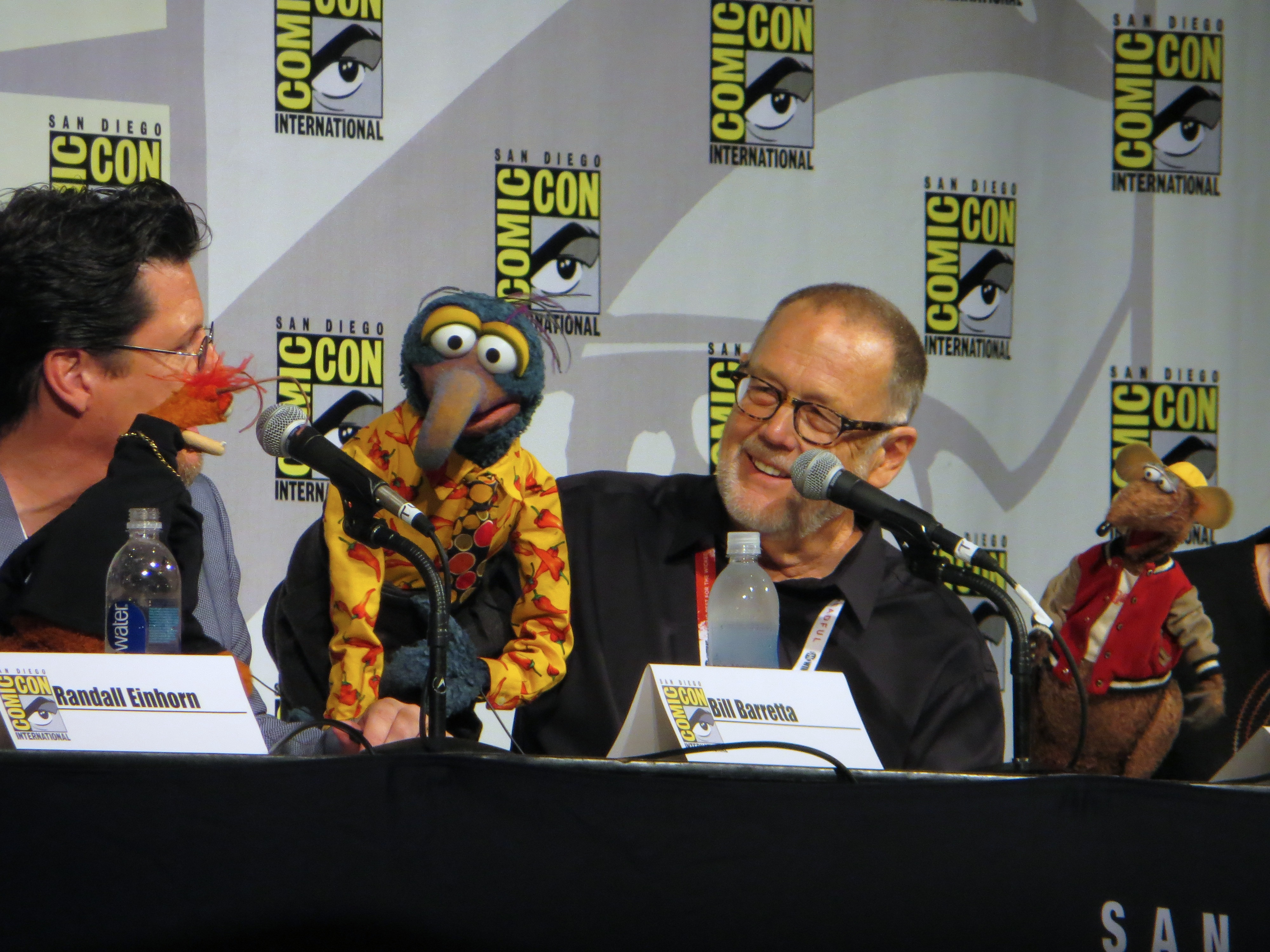
Goelz performing Gonzo at San Diego Comic-Con 2015

In 2002, Goelz was cast as the voice of Figment in the revamped version of Epcot's Journey Into Imagination with Figment ride at Walt Disney World Resort.

Goelz continues to regularly perform in new Muppet productions. In 2011 and 2014, he reprised his roles as Gonzo, Dr. Bunsen Honeydew, Zoot, Waldorf, Beauregard and other signature characters in The Muppets and Muppets Most Wanted. In 2023, he performed Zoot in the Disney+ series The Muppets Mayhem.

In 2015, Goelz voiced Subconscious Guard Frank in the Pixar film Inside Out. He reprised the role as Mind Cop Frank in Inside Out 2 in 2024. In 2019, he voiced Baffi the Fizzgig in the Netflix original series The Dark Crystal: Age of Resistance. Since 2018, he has voiced characters in various installments of the StoryBots franchise.

Goelz reprised the voices of his Fraggle Rock roles in the Apple TV+ Fraggle Rock: Rock On! shorts in 2020, with puppeteering by John Tartaglia. Following the success of the shorts, a reboot of Fraggle Rock was ordered by the streaming service. Fraggle Rock: Back to the Rock premiered on January 21, 2022, with Goelz continuing to provide voices of his characters and serving as co-executive producer.

In February 2026, Goelz reprised his roles for ABC's The Muppet Show revival special starring Sabrina Carpenter.

== Personal life ==
Goelz is married to Debra Goelz, a writer and former CFO of Jim Henson Productions. They have two children.

Over the years, Goelz has sustained a number of injuries due to the physical positions Muppet performers must maintain for extended periods while contorting into small spaces. These injuries have resulted in four shoulder surgeries and a hip replacement.

== Filmography ==
=== Film ===
| Year | Title | Role | Notes |
|---|---|---|---|
| 1961 | The Parent Trap | | Extra |
| 1979 | The Muppet Movie | Gonzo, Dr. Bunsen Honeydew, Zoot, Doglion, Beauregard | Performer |
| 1981 | The Great Muppet Caper | Gonzo, Beauregard, Zoot, Dr. Bunsen Honeydew and Lubbock Lou | Performer |
| 1982 | The Dark Crystal | General, Fizzgig | Puppeteer |
| 1984 | The Muppets Take Manhattan | Gonzo, Chester the Rat, Bill the Frog, Zoot, a Penguin, Jim the Dog, Baby Gonzo, Beauregard and Dr. Bunsen Honeydew | Performer |
| 1986 | Labyrinth | Sir Didymus, The Hat, Left Door Knocker, Fiery #3, Guard | Puppeteer |
| 1986 | The Christmas Toy | Rugby Tiger, Ditz | Performer; television film |
| 1992 | The Muppet Christmas Carol | Gonzo (as Charles Dickens), Waldorf (as Robert Marley), Betina Cratchit, Dr. Bunsen Honeydew | Performer |
| 1994 | Muppet Classic Theater | Gonzo, Randy Pig, Elvis | Performer; direct-to-video film |
| 1996 | Muppet Treasure Island | Gonzo, Dr. Bunsen Honeydew, Waldorf, Zoot, Mudwell the Mudbunny | Performer |
| 1999 | Muppets from Space | Gonzo, Dr. Bunsen Honeydew, Zoot, Waldorf, Birdman, Beauregard | Performer |
| 1999 | The Adventures of Elmo in Grouchland | Humongous Chicken | Performer |
| 2002 | Kermit's Swamp Years | Young Waldorf | Performer; direct-to-video film |
| 2002 | It's a Very Merry Muppet Christmas Movie | Gonzo, Dr. Bunsen Honeydew, Waldorf, Zoot, Beauregard | Performer; television film |
| 2005 | The Muppets' Wizard of Oz | Gonzo, Dr. Bunsen Honeydew, Waldorf, Zoot, Audience Member (on-screen cameo) | Performer; television film |
| 2011 | The Muppets | Gonzo, Dr. Bunsen Honeydew, Zoot, Waldorf, Beauregard, Kermit Moopet | Performer |
| 2014 | Muppets Most Wanted | Gonzo, Dr. Bunsen Honeydew, Zoot, Waldorf, Beauregard, Baby, Penguin | Performer |
| 2015 | Inside Out | Subconscious Guard Frank | Voice |
| 2024 | Inside Out 2 | Mind Cop Frank | Voice |

=== Television ===
| Year(s) | Title | Role | Notes |
|---|---|---|---|
| 1974 | The Muppets Valentine Show | Brewster, Frogs, Crumpet | Performer; ABC television special |
| 1976–1981, 2026 | The Muppet Show | Gonzo the Great, Zoot, Dr. Bunsen Honeydew, Beauregard, Alfredo the Mop Dancer, Banananose Moldenado, Brewster, Bullets Barker, Dr. Salamander, Inspector LaBrea, Johnny, Kermit the Pig, Klaus Mueller, Koozebanian Spooble, Sundance, Lubbock Lou, Luis Greco, Mackerel, Matador, Mr. Dawson, Muppy, Otto the Automatic Entertainer, Rabbi, Righton Bird, Salzburg Sauerkraut Singer, Signor Baffi, Walter Tell, Warthog, Wig Trainer, Additional Muppets | Performer |
| 1977 | Emmet Otter's Jug-Band Christmas | Wendell Porcupine, Will Possum, Pop-eyed Catfish | Performer; HBO television special |
| 1979 | The Tonight Show Starring Johnny Carson | Gonzo | Performer; 1 episode |
| 1981 | The Muppets Go to the Movies | Gonzo, Beauregard, Joe, Firefighter, Trumpet Blower, Rat, Horse | Performer; ABC television special |
| 1983–1987 | Fraggle Rock | Boober Fraggle, Clerk Fraggle, Large Marvin Fraggle, Philo, Uncle Traveling Matt, 7-Words-Max, Sidebottom, Skenfrith, World's Oldest Fraggle, Wrench Doozer | Performer |
| 1985 | Little Muppet Monsters | Gonzo, Zoot | Performer; 3 episodes |
| 1986 | The Muppets: A Celebration of 30 Years | Gonzo, Zoot, Uncle Traveling Matt, and Beauregard | Performer; CBS television special |
| 1987 | A Muppet Family Christmas | Gonzo the Great, Dr. Bunsen Honeydew, Zoot, Beauregard, Boober Fraggle, Uncle Traveling Matt, and Baby Gonzo | Performer; CBS television special |
| 1989–1993 | The Jim Henson Hour | Gonzo, Digit, Cabbage, Doglion, Timmy Monster, Dr. Bunsen Honeydew, Frisky, Jade Green Frackle, Milton | Performer |
| 1990 | The Cosby Show | Gonzo | Performer; episode: "Cliff's Nightmare" |
| 1990 | The Earth Day Special | Elderly Frog | Performer; ABC television special |
| 1990 | The Magical World of Disney | Gonzo, Dr. Bunsen Honeydew, Beauregarde | Performer; 2 episodes |
| 1990 | The Muppets Celebrate Jim Henson | Gonzo, Beauregard, Boober, Zoot | Performer; CBS television special |
| 1991–1992 | Dinosaurs | Earl Sinclair, Grapdelite, General Chow | Puppeteer |
| 1992 | Blue Peter | Gonzo | Voice; 1 episode |
| 1992 | What's Up Doc? | Gonzo | Performer; 1 episode |
| 1993 | Sesame Street | China Shop Clerk, Elephant, Mr. Between, Piño, Rocky, Lavender Royal Sycophant | Performer |
| 1994 | Secret Life of Toys | Rugby Tiger, Ditz | Performer |
| 1995 | Jim Henson's Animal Show | Stinky the Skunk | Performer |
| 1996–1998 | Muppets Tonight | Gonzo, Waldorf, Randy Pig, Beauregard, Artie, Baby Kramer, Bill the Bubble Guy, Bud, Cupid, Dr. Pain, Elvises, Gary Cahuenga, Jean-Dodd van Clamme, Morty, Purple Extreme, Purple Rain Man, Stu, Additional Muppets | Performer |
| 1999 | Bear in the Big Blue House | Jack the Dog | Performer; 1 special |
| 2004, 2011 | Saturday Night Live | Gonzo, Waldorf | Performer; 2 episodes |
| 2008 | Studio DC: Almost Live | Gonzo, Zoot, Waldorf, Dr. Bunsen Honeydew, Pancake the Water Buffalo | Performer |
| 2008 | A Muppets Christmas: Letters to Santa | Gonzo, Dr. Bunsen Honeydew, Zoot, Waldorf, Beauregard | Performer; NBC television special |
| 2009 | Late Night with Jimmy Fallon | Gonzo, Waldorf | Performer; 2 episodes |
| 2011 | WWE Raw | Gonzo, Dr. Bunsen Honeydew, Waldorf | Performer; 1 episode |
| 2012 | Jimmy Kimmel Live! | Zoot | Performer; 1 episode |
| 2015–2016 | The Muppets | Gonzo, Dr. Bunsen Honeydew, Waldorf, Zoot, Chip, Randy Pig | Performer |
| 2018 | Ask the StoryBots | Mr. Caterpillar | Voice; episode: "How Do Flowers Grow?" |
| 2019 | The Dark Crystal: Age of Resistance | Baffi | Performer; 3 episodes |
| 2020 | Fraggle Rock: Rock On! | Boober Fraggle, Uncle Travelling Matt | Voices only; co-executive producer; television shorts |
| 2020 | Prop Culture | | Self; Episode: "The Muppet Movie" |
| 2020 | Muppets Now | Gonzo, Dr. Bunsen Honeydew, Waldorf, Zoot, Chip, Beauregard | Performer |
| 2021 | Muppets Haunted Mansion | Gonzo, Dr. Bunsen Honeydew, Waldorf, Zoot, Chip, Randy Pig, Beauregard | Performer; Disney+ special |
| 2022–2023 | StoryBots: Answer Time | Doink | Voice |
| 2022–2024 | Fraggle Rock: Back to the Rock | Boober Fraggle, Uncle Traveling Matt, The World's Oldest Fraggle | Voices only; co-executive producer |
| 2023 | The Muppets Mayhem | Zoot, Waldorf, Jimmy Shoe | Performer |
| 2026 | The Muppet Show | Gonzo, Dr. Bunsen Honeydew, Waldorf, Zoot, Beauregard (uncredited) | Performer; Disney+ special |

=== Video games ===
| Year(s) | Title | Role | Notes |
|---|---|---|---|
| 2000 | Muppet RaceMania | Gonzo, Dr. Bunsen Honeydew, Zoot, Waldorf, Beauregard, Bill | Voice |
| 2000 | Muppet Monster Adventure | Gonzo, Dr. Bunsen Honeydew, Baron Petri von Honeydew, Chives the Butler | Voice |
| 2003 | Muppets Party Cruise | Gonzo, Dr. Bunsen Honeydew, Waldorf, Randy Pig, Digit, Zoot | Voice |

=== Other appearances ===
| Year(s) | Title | Role | Notes |
|---|---|---|---|
| 1991 | Muppet*Vision 3D | Gonzo, Dr. Bunsen Honeydew, Zoot, Rick, Dinah | Performer; theme park show |
| 2002 | Journey into Imagination with Figment | Figment | Voice; theme park attraction |
| 2005 | Statler and Waldorf: From the Balcony | Waldorf | Performer (8 episodes), web series |
| 2010 | The Muppets Kitchen with Cat Cora | Gonzo, Dr. Bunsen Honeydew, Beauregard, Randy Pig | Performer; web series |
| 2016–2019 | The Muppets Present...Great Moments in American History | Gonzo | Voice; theme park show |
| 2017 | The Muppets Take the Bowl | Gonzo, Dr. Bunsen Honeydew, Zoot, Waldorf, Chip, Beauregard | Performer; live show at the Hollywood Bowl, Sept. 8–10 |
| 2018 | The Muppets Take the O2 | Gonzo, Dr. Bunsen Honeydew, Zoot, Waldorf, Chip, Beauregard | Performer; live show at the O2, Jul. 13–14 |
| 2021 | The Muppets' Christmas Caroling Coach | Gonzo | Voice; theme park show |
| 2025 | "World of Color Happiness!" preshow | Gonzo, Bunsen, Waldorf | Performer (prerecorded footage); theme park show |
| 2026 | Rock 'n' Roller Coaster Starring The Muppets | Gonzo, Dr. Bunsen Honeydew, Zoot, Waldorf, Chip, Beauregard | Performer (Audio-Animatronic voice and prerecorded footage); theme park attraction |

| Preceded by Jim Henson | Performer of Waldorf; 1992–present | Succeeded by None |
| Preceded by None | Gonzo; 1976–present | Succeeded by None |
| Preceded by None | Bunsen Honeydew; 1976–present | Succeeded by None |
| Preceded by None | Big Mean Carl; 1992 | Succeeded by Bill Barretta |
| Preceded by None | Randy Pig; 1994–present | Succeeded by None |
| Preceded by None | Beauregard; 1978–present | Succeeded by None |
| Preceded by None | Zoot; 1975–present | Succeeded by None |
| Preceded by None | Kermoot; 2011–present | Succeeded by None |
| Preceded by None | Philo; 1983–1993 | Succeeded by Dan Garza |
| Preceded by None | Large Marvin Fraggle; 1983–1987 | Succeeded by Frank Meschkuleit |
| Preceded by None | Wrench Doozer; 1984–1987 | Succeeded by Andy Hayward |
