= Clair Wilcox =

American economist

Clair Wilcox (1898 – 1970) was an American economist.

== Biography ==
He was on the faculty of Swarthmore College from 1927 to 1968. He chaired the International Trade Conference, which resulted in the General Agreement on Tariffs and Trade.

Wilcox was born in Cuba, New York, and obtained his B.S. and Ph.D. from the University of Pennsylvania. Before going to Swarthmore, Wilcox taught at Lafayette, Ohio Wesleyan and the University of Pennsylvania. Two of his most important works are: Competition and Monopoly in American Industry and Toward Social Welfare. He wrote a monumental book on government regulation of business, Public Policy Towards Business.

Wilcox was "the leading spirit" in the Economists' Protest against Smoot–Hawley Tariff Act of 1930.

Wilcox was married to Florence Ruth Chapman, and had two daughters, Andrea and Carolyn (later known as Caroly Wilcox). After his first wife died in 1954, he remarried, to Marcia Lincoln Wallace. He died in 1970, aged 72 years, while traveling in Tucson, Arizona.
