= Secret Life of Toys =

1994 children's TV series

- Genre: Children's television series
- Written by: Jocelyn Stevenson
- Voices of: Jerry Nelson; Dave Goelz; Louise Gold; Nigel Plaskitt; Mike Quinn
- Theme music composer: PEEK-A-BOO
- Composers: Jocelyn Stevenson (Lyrics); Markus Windt (Sound)
- Countries of origin: Germany; United Kingdom; United States
- Original language: English
- No. of seasons: 1
- No. of episodes: 13

Production
- Executive producer: Brian Henson
- Producer: Peter Coogan
- Running time: 10 minutes
- Production company: Jim Henson Productions

Original release
- Network: The Disney Channel (U.S.); BBC (UK)
- Release: 5 March – 28 May 1994

Secret Life of Toys is a 1994 children's TV series based on the 1986 Christmas TV special The Christmas Toy which aired from March to May 1994 with thirteen episodes, each 30 minutes long and consisting of two 15-minute stories. The show was filmed in Monheim, Germany, near the Dutch border, and aired on The Disney Channel in the United States beginning on 5 March 1994, the BBC in the United Kingdom, Family Channel, Vrak and TVO in Canada, Spacetoon in Arabic regions, Top TV in South Africa, The Kids' Channel in Israel, RTB in Brunei, American Forces Network in Germany and Japan, TVP1 in Poland, Channel 55 in Bahrain, and ABC TV in Australia. The series was formerly available on Netflix, Hulu and Kidoodle.TV. As of July 2025, the series is featured on the Yippee TV streaming service.

== Plot ==
The series follows the adventures of Rugby Tiger and his friends in a new playroom with different children, Penny and Simon, whose playtime affects how they behave in their absence. For the toys' safety, they have a code called a set of no-nos. When a toy breaks one of these rules, the toys must work together to keep the fact that they can move and talk secret from humans.

== Characters ==
=== Main characters ===
- Rugby Tiger (Dave Goelz) is an energetic and adventurous tiger plush toy. He was designed by Larry DiFiori and built by Rollie Krewson.
- Mew (Nigel Plaskitt) is a catnip mouse toy that belongs to the family cat and is Rugby's friend. He was designed by Larry DiFiori and built by Joann Green.
- Balthazar (Jerry Nelson) is an old and wise bear plush toy who is like a father to the toys and tells them when it is safe for them to move. He was designed by Larry DiFiori and built by Joann Green.
- Raisin (Louise Gold) is a tomboyish rag doll.
- Hortense (Louise Gold) is a nervous rocking horse.
- Ditz (Dave Goelz) is a clown plush toy. He was designed by Larry DiFiori and built by Marian Keating.

=== Other characters ===
- Bratty Rat (Jerry Nelson) is a shifty rat who was purchased at a secondhand store.
- Bunny Lamp (Mike Quinn) manages lighting in the toy room and warns the toys when people are coming.
- Bleep (Rob Mills) is a toy robot who sometimes freezes when talking. He was designed by Larry DiFiori and built by Tom Newby and Norman Tempia.
- Cruiser (Brian Henson) is a toy who drives a taxi. His motto is "A dollar on the drop, and ten cents for any additional miles." He was designed by Larry DiFiori and built by Tom Newby and Norman Tempia.
- Datz (Jerry Nelson) is a paper bag puppet who resembles his brother, Ditz.
- Dinkybeard (Jerry Nelson) is a wooden toy pirate. He was designed and built by Paul Andrejco.
- Daffodil (Louise Gold) is a princess doll who lives on the top shelf. She is among the oldest toys, having previously belonged to another family. After her original owner grew up and moved away, she lived alone in the house's attic until the Penny and Simon found her and brought her into the playroom. Because of this, she is the only toy who knows what the attic is.
- Eggie (Mike Quinn) is a dimwitted toy egg who thinks that eggs are the world's smartest creatures.
- Humble Gary (Mike Quinn) is a humble toy tiger.

== Episodes ==
No.	Title	Original release date
1	"Oops! / Don't Tell Me"	5 March 1994
Oops! – Hortense sneezes and accidentally sets off a Rube Goldberg machine that Penny and Simon had set up for a practical joke using her as part of it, breaking the First No-No, "Never destroy anything belonging to the children". The toys must put the machine back together before they return.; Don't Tell Me – Rugby dislikes being told what will happen or how things work, preferring to discover them for himself. However, when his stubbornness causes him to be locked out of the playroom, he must listen to others to solve his problem.
2	"Follow the Leader / Disappearing Ditz"	12 March 1994
Follow the Leader – Balthazar, who is feeling old and tired, sees how the toys admire the youth and strength of Dr. Wizardo, the hero of one of Penny and Simon's computer games. He presses the "escape" button and lets Wizardo out to be leader, but must save his friends after things worsen, soon discovering that there is more to being a leader than youth and strength.; Disappearing Ditz – After Ditz interrupts Rugby's magic show, Rugby wishes that he would disappear and, after Ditz agrees to, puts Ditz in his magic box to perform the trick. After he falls through a broken board and disappears, Rugby realizes that you must be careful what you wish for.
3	"I'm Going to Tell... / The Cat Toy That Roared"	19 March 1994
I'm Going to Tell... – After Raisin accidentally tapes over one of Penny and Simon's audio cassettes, Bratty Rat threatens to tell on her, which he does despite her efforts to stop him. However, the consequences are not what she expected.; The Cat Toy That Roared – Mew borrows Rugby's tail for a game of Pin the Tail on the Tiger. Once blindfolded, he wanders into the children's imaginary lion's den. When the lion roars, Mew drops the tail and flees out of fright. He must now return Rugby's tail, but is afraid to enter the lion's den.
4	"Rock-a-Bye Worries / The Magic Fish"	26 March 1994
Rock-a-Bye Worries – Hortense, who believes herself to be the getaway horse in a bank robbery, rocks until she falls over, which worries the toys.; The Magic Fish – The Magic Fish is a fortune-telling game that Penny and Simon play. The fish later comes to life and starts answering questions. Raisin, who does not want to take turns learning the answers to her questions, kidnaps the fish to have him to herself.
5	"Climbers / Be Plush"	2 April 1994
Climbers – While the toys believe that Balthazar is afraid of nothing, he is secretly afraid of heights. When Felix the Climber, who was last seen climbing the rafters, is found trapped behind an old radiator, Balthazar must face his fears in order to save him.; Be Plush – Rugby considers himself to be the "plushest" toy in the playroom until he meets Humble Gary, a new stuffed tiger who was given to Penny and Simon. As Rugby sets out to teach him how to be "plush", he discovers that he knows more than he thought.
6	"Queen Raisin / Balthazar in Beam Land"	9 April 1994
Queen Raisin – Tired of Daffodil always being chosen as queen, Raisin tries to get her crown, but must reach the shelf to do so.; Balthazar in Beam Land – When Rugby annoys the toys by doing the opposite of what he is told, Balthazar realizes that he is like himself when he was younger. When he tells Rugby to go to the attic, which the toys call Beamland, Rugby does not refuse, as he expected, and he has to save him.
7	"Ditz and Datz / Mummies"	16 April 1994
Ditz and Datz – Penny and Simon make a puppet out of a paper bag, which they name Datz and declare him to be Ditz's brother. The other toys know that Datz is just a paper bag, but Ditz is happy to have a brother. Fueled by Ditz's belief in him, Datz comes to life, and Ditz must choose between his friends and his "brother".; Mummies – After Rugby states that he is not afraid of the Mummy that could return claim the Mummy Stone he possesses, Raisin comes up with a plan to scare him and prove him wrong.
8	"All Washed Up / Bunnochio"	23 April 1994
All Washed Up – Ditz gets washed and hung up to dry. When he is taken clothesline, he finds that he cannot put his arms down. In order to cheer him up, his friends find ways to make him useful. However, once his arms are unstuck, he does not know how to be useful.; Bunnochio – The Bunny Lamp wants to be a real toy, a wish that is granted with the help of the other toys. However, he soon realizes that without him, there is no one to manage the lamp.
9	"More Than a Mouse / Happy Hortense to You"	30 April 1994
More Than a Mouse – Seeking to prove that he is a mouse and not just a cat toy, Mew moves into what he thinks is a mousehole, but is actually a tunnel set up for Penny and Simon's electric train. When Rugby gets stuck in the tunnel trying to get Mew out before the train comes, Mew must save him.; Happy Hortense to You – After Hortense is left out of Penny and Simon's birthday celebration, the toys decide to throw her a birthday party.
10	"Down with Dinkybeard / The Sky is Falling!"	7 May 1994
Down with Dinkybeard – Dinkybeard comes to the playroom to play pirates just as Raisin wants to show the toys her acrobatics. Because they want to play pirates, she comes to dislike Dinkybeard, but changes her mind when he saves her from a fall.; The Sky is Falling! – When Ditz discovers a piece of one of Penny and Simon's puzzles, he thinks that he has found a piece of the sky and asks Eggy to help him put it back in its place.
11	"Baby Balthazar / True Mew"	14 May 1994
Baby Balthazar – Balthazar, who is tired of his responsibilities, says that he would like to be a carefree baby. Despite the toys warning him, he insists that this is what he wants and gets his wish, which goes well until the toys need his help.; True Mew – The toys believe that Daffodil is not like them and that, because she doesn't say much, does not understand. After Penny and Simon forget to put her back on the shelf, Mew is chosen to look after her. When she goes beyond the Beamland door, he discovers that she understands more than they though.
12	"Mr. and Mrs. Rugby / I Spy"	21 May 1994
Mr. and Mrs. Rugby – Penny and Simon tie Rugby and Raisin together and pronounce them married, which Rugby is upset by since he was to be taken to the window for lookout.; I Spy – After Spy Guy, a toy Penny and Simon ordered, arrives at the house, they are upset that he is a bear because they already have a bear toy. Their mother suggests they take him back, but he wants to stay. He disguises himself as Balthazar and plans to send him back to the store in his place.
13	"Who Shares Wins / It's a Giveaway"	28 May 1994
Who Shares Wins – If a toy is not shared, they become invisible to other toys until they are shared again. This happens to Mew on the day of the Big Bounce Contest, and, determined not to ruin his team's chances, he sets out to become visible again; It's a Giveaway – Penny and Simon decide to give Rugby away to the local children's hospital. Though being a Giveaway is the greatest honor a toy can have, Rugby is reluctant to leave his friends behind.
