= The Muppet Show: Sex and Violence =

1975 The Muppets television special

- Genre: Television special
- Created by: Jim Henson
- Written by: Jim Henson; Jon Stone; Marshall Brickman; Norman Stiles
- Directed by: Dave Wilson
- Starring: Jim Henson; Frank Oz; Jerry Nelson; Richard Hunt; Dave Goelz; Fran Brill; John Lovelady; Jenny Oates; Caroly Wilcox; Rollie Krewson; Jane Henson
- Theme music composer: Joe Raposo
- Country of origin: United States

Production
- Producer: Jim Henson
- Editor: Alfred Muller
- Running time: 25 minutes
- Production company: Muppets, Inc.

Original release
- Network: ABC
- Release: March 19, 1975

The Muppet Show: Sex and Violence is the second of two pilots for The Muppet Show, airing on ABC on March 19, 1975. The other pilot, The Muppets Valentine Show, aired in 1974.

== Plot ==
In this half-hour variety special, the Muppets parody the proliferation of sex and violence on television. Nigel, Sam the Eagle and hippie bassist Floyd Pepper prepare for a pageant based on the seven deadly sins.

Sketches include:

- Mount Rushmore: The stone presidents trade jokes
- At the Dance (with Bert and Ernie, Anything Muppets, Thudge, Kermit the Frog, etc.
- The Wrestling Match: The San Francisco Earthquake displays his winning tactics (while The Anything Muppets, Statler, Waldorf, Kermit the Frog, Sam the Eagle, etc. watch the match).
- Statler and Waldorf
- The Swedish Chef demonstrates how to make a submarine sandwich
- Male birds try to attract female birds in a jazzy sketch.
- Dr. Teeth and the Electric Mayhem sing "Love Ya to Death"
- Theater of Things: A group of pencils are introduced to a new ruler
- Two Heaps and Two Stalks talk in gibberish
- Films in Focus: A review, Gene Shalit (muppet version of him) pans the film Return to Beneath the Planet of the Pigs, with Rex, Miss Piggy, Dr. Nauga and the Pigs. This sketch would become the basis for the comedy sketch series "Pigs in Space"
- The Seven Deadly Sins Pageant

== Cast ==
The special introduced several new Muppets, including Nigel (who acts as host, but would eventually play a minor role as an orchestra conductor on The Muppet Show), Sam the Eagle, Dr. Teeth, Animal, Floyd Pepper, Janice, Zoot, the Swedish Chef, Statler and Waldorf and an early version of Dr. Julius Strangepork (named Dr. Nauga). Popular Jim Henson characters, such as Kermit the Frog, Rowlf the Dog and Frank Oz's Bert have cameos. Several holdovers from the previous pilot, The Muppets Valentine Show, appear, such as Crazy Donald (now called Crazy Harry), George the Janitor, Mildred Huxtetter and Brewster. The special also includes early versions of Miss Piggy, Fozzie Bear and Gonzo the Great.

- Jim Henson as Nigel, Scudge, Snerf, George Washington (Mount Rushmore), Swedish Chef, Dr. Teeth, Waldorf, Kermit the Frog, Shirley (puppetry), Green Heap, Ernie, Woman, Rex and Rowlf the Dog
- Frank Oz as Animal, Beautiful Day Monster, Billy Monster, Sam the Eagle, Theodore Roosevelt (Mount Rushmore), The San Francisco Earthquake's wrestling opponent, Clyde, Ruler, Purple Heap, Bert, Pig, Yorick, and George the Janitor
- Jerry Nelson as the Announcer, Floyd Pepper, Thomas Jefferson (Mount Rushmore), Thudge, Thudge's dancing partner, Statler, Harvey, Envy, Pencil, Gold Stalk, Gluttony, Gene Shalit Muppet, Dr. Nauga and Sloth
- Richard Hunt as Crazy Harry, Mel, Hoggie Marsh and Lust
- Dave Goelz as The San Francisco Earthquake, Avarice, Zoot, Duke and Brewster
- John Lovelady as Abraham Lincoln (Mount Rushmore head), Baskerville the Hound, Vanity and Anger
- Fran Brill as the receptionist's voice, the mouthless female hippie teenage girl, Janice, Doris, Pink Stalk, Leafy Green Vegetables, Miss Piggy, Queen Pig and the Whatnot dancer
- Jonathan Frith as Junior Monster
- Rollie Krewson as Shirley (voice)

Additional Muppet performers include Caroly Wilcox, Nancy McGeorge, Greg Antonacci, Byron Whiting, John Byrum, Cary Antebi, Eren Ozker, Danny Seagren, Bonnie Erickson, Marilyn Sokol, Brian Henson, John Henson (puppeteer), Lisa Henson, Cheryl Henson, Don Sahlin and Jane Henson.

== Production ==
In August 1974, Jim Henson and ABC reached an agreement granting the network exclusive broadcast rights to the Muppets and greenlighting several specials, including an after-school special, a TV movie and a second pilot episode; the first had been The Muppets Valentine Show in 1974. The new pilot, which Henson informally called "The Muppet Nonsense Show", was to strike a different tone than that of the first effort, with recurring gags and a zanier tone.

Henson also wished to demonstrate that the Muppets appealed to adult audiences, saying: "A lot of our work has always been adult-oriented. So we'll be working a lot with those aspects of the Muppets. Through this pilot, we hope to be able to demonstrate that puppetry can be very solid adult entertainment."

The special featured 70 Muppets manipulated by 10 puppeteers, including several new characters. Dr. Teeth was designed by Michael Frith from a drawing provided by Henson that was inspired by singer Dr. John. The Swedish Chef, a character first conceived in the 1960s, debuted as Järnvägskorsning (Swedish for "railway crossing"), a name that Henson soon abandoned, believing it too difficult to remember or pronounce. Sam Eagle was another new character created by Henson that "represents the older establishment values." Miss Piggy had first appeared on the 1974 ABC special Herb Alpert and the TJB.

At Henson's request, Kermit the Frog was relegated to a brief cameo appearance in a dance sequence, with the emcee role given to a new Muppet character named Nigel. According to Sesame Street writer and director Jon Stone, Henson wished to establish another lead character in order to free himself to pursue other creative opportunities. However, when Henson realized that the Nigel character was a mistake, it was too late to make any changes.

Taping for the pilot commenced in November 1974 at Metromedia-TV (Channel-5) studios in NYC, and a rough edit was sent to ABC in January 1975. The network suggested several changes and expressed its concern over Henson's proposed title, but Henson insisted that the title remain. He later said: "The special's title was a humorous hook. While the show depicted some of the current attitudes toward sex and violence, our purpose was to poke fun at them."

Henson did accede to several of ABC's requests, which included the deletion of an introductory segment featuring Henson on camera as himself and the shortening of a Dr. Teeth and the Electric Mayhem musical number.

When the special aired, its title appeared in television listings as simply The Muppet Show (billed in some listings as The Muppets Show) in the wake of the recent commitment by all three major networks to comply with the Family Viewing Hour rule in the 1975 season.

== Reception ==
Contemporary reviews following the special's nationwide broadcast on March 19, 1975 were mixed.

Arthur Unger of The Christian Science Monitor wrote:

Much of the broad humor was so broad that it was flattened out and some of it is so subtle it would have had to run in slow-motion for the uninitiated to catch. And there was an elitist quality to the show—designed to make you shake your head sadly and laugh, too, because you know the cultists just adored it. The you-may-not-get-it-but-I-do humor may have made you feel guilty when only the easy sight gags seemed at all funny while all around you the cognoscente were busy appreciating the intellectual content. This kind of rarified humor is totally missing in the "Sesame Street" Muppetry—there the humor is complex enough to appeal to the kids and yet simple enough for us adults to appreciate as well. In this special, the quality of lovableness was somehow missing—where, oh where, was the endearing humanness of Cookie Monster and Big Bird? ... Please, Mr. Henson, try again.

In a positive review for The Arizona Republic, critic Thomas Goldthwaite called the special "hands down the most original, innovative thought that ABC has ever had" and "[a] surrealistic romp full of menacing ogling, jerky energy and such intensive fun-making that it's bound to wipe every other show off the charts with the thoroughness of a Cookie Monster."

== Home media ==
The Muppet Show: Sex and Violence was released on DVD in 2005 as an extra feature on the Muppet Show: Season One box set. On the box and within the DVD menus, it is called The Muppet Show Pilot.
