= Kurt S. Adler =

German American businessman (1921– 2004)

Kurt Stephan Adler (June 19, 1921 – November 25, 2004) was a German-American businessman. He was the founder of Kurt S. Adler, Inc., one of the world's largest Christmas ornament businesses.

== Biography ==
Adler was born into a Jewish family on June 19, 1921, in Würzburg, Germany. When he was 16, with sponsorship from an uncle living in the U.S., he was sent by his parents to live in Manhattan to escape Nazi Germany. Adler learned English and attended high school. He was joined by his parents and sister in 1938. Adler was a shipping clerk in the United States Army during World War II.

After returning from the war, he started a business importing and exporting products like pottery, glassware, and pineapples. After importing hand-carved angels from Bavaria, Adler realized that focusing on Christmas items could be lucrative. He sold European figurines and snow globes to American retailers that often became collector's items. Adler started to sell artificial trees from Nuremberg in the 1950s and, in the late 1960s, he was one of the first to sell miniature light strands from Italy. He was also one of the first to use licensed images on Christmas decorations from Walt Disney and Warner Brothers.

In 2002, in a tribute to his transformation of the Christmas business in the United States, Austrian, Swiss & German Life magazine called him "America's Father Christmas".

Adler, who had Parkinson's disease, died of heart failure on November 25, 2004, at his home in Manhattan.

The company is now run by Adler's four children. It has over 100 employees with offices in Hong Kong and Taiwan, and sells more than 20,000 different items for Christmas, Halloween, Easter, Thanksgiving, and Hanukkah. About half of their items are retired every year in favor of new ones, which are displayed in over one dozen showrooms located around the world. It celebrated 75 years in business in 2021.
