= David Lazer =

American computer scientist

- Education: University of Michigan; Wesleyan University
- Known for: Computational Social Science
- Scientific career
- Fields: Political Science; Computer and Information Science
- Workplaces: Northeastern University; Harvard University; Princeton University
- Website: davidlazer.com

David Lazer is a distinguished professor of political science and computer and information science at Northeastern University, as well as the co-director of the NULab of Texts, Maps, and Networks.

== Life ==
=== Early life and education ===
David Lazer obtained a bachelor of arts in economics in 1988 from Wesleyan University in Middletown, Connecticut. He subsequently received his Ph.D. in political science in 1996 from the University of Michigan, Ann Arbor.

=== Career ===
Lazer's first academic position after graduate school was as a lecturer at Princeton University's Department of Politics, where he taught from 1996 to 1998. In 1998 he became an assistant professor of public policy at Harvard University's John F. Kennedy School of Government, and was promoted to associate professor in 2003. Lazer left Harvard in 2009 to join the faculty at Northeastern University, where he received dual-appointments in the Department of Political Science and the College of Computer and Information Science. Lazer was promoted to full professor in 2012 and to distinguished professor in 2014.

== Areas of research ==
Lazer is particularly well known for his research on computational social science, stemming from his 2009 article "Life in the network: the coming age of computational social science".

Lazer has published numerous articles on elections in the United States. One study he co-authored in 2010 found that Americans are more willing to deliberate with congressional leaders than had previously been expected.
