= Rollie Krewson =

Muppet designer

Rollie Krewson (sometimes credited as "Rollin Krewson") is a puppet designer and builder known for her work on various Muppet productions. She interned with Jim Henson's company in the mid-1970s. Although she now works primarily as a designer/builder, she began as a performer, doing small bits on The Muppet Show and other projects.

She has contributed to almost every Henson production since her arrival, and to this day carries her skills through on Sesame Street. Krewson was the designer for Julia, Sesame's autistic Muppet character.

Krewson has received seven Daytime Emmy Awards for her contributions on Sesame Street and has been nominated many times for her work on other Henson productions.

== Design credits ==
- Sesame Beginnings - built Baby Elmo, Elmo's Dad
- Sesame English - built Tingo
- Plaza Sesamo - built Lola and Pancho
- The Adventures of Elmo in Grouchland (1999) - (Muppet builder/designer)
- Muppets from Space (1999) - (project supervisor: Muppet workshop)
- Big Bag - built Chelli
- The Wubbulous World of Dr. Seuss - built Norval the Fish Project Supervisor
- Dog City (1993) - (Muppet workshop) (project supervisor)
- The Muppet Christmas Carol (1992) - (Muppet workshop) (Muppet Designer and Builder)
- The Jim Henson Hour (1989) - built Lindbergh
- The Christmas Toy (1986) - (Muppet design group) - built Rugby Tiger
- Labyrinth (1986) - Creature workshop artist: The Wiseman, Alph and Ralph, Goblins
- The Muppets Take Manhattan (1984) - (Muppets' studio coordinator)
- Tale of the Bunny Picnic - built Twitch and Bean Bunny
- Fraggle Rock (1983) - built Wembley Fraggle, Red Fraggle, Balsam the Minstrel, others
- The Dark Crystal (1982) - Creature design/Fabrication supervisor: Fizzgig
- Emmet Otter's Jug-Band Christmas (1977) - built Wendel
- The Muppet Show (1976) - Muppet designer/workshop supervisor; built Wayne and Wanda, Fozzie Bear's dummy Chuckie, Foo Foo and many others
- Sesame Street (1969) - built Zoe, Curly Bear, Abby Cadabby, Lulu and many more; has built Elmo since 1988
- Sisimpur - built Halum, Shiku, Ikri-Mikri, Tuktuki
- Sesamstrasse - built Pferd

International Sesame Street Puppets for Russia, Germany, the Netherlands, South Africa, Bangladesh, India, Egypt, Japan and Indonesia

== Performer credits ==
- The Muppet Show: Sex and Violence
- The Muppets Go to the Movies
- The Muppet Show - Mary Louise
- Labyrinth - Fiery 5 (assistant)
- The Dark Crystal - Assistant puppeteer (Fizzgig, Kira, Garthim Master)
- Saturday Night Live - Assistant puppeteer
