= Don Hinkley =

American screenwriter (1922–1981)

- Born: Donald Burton Hinkley; 1922; Richmond, California, U.S.
- Died: February 1981 (age 58–59); Toronto, Ontario, Canada
- Occupation: Screenwriter

Donald Burton Hinkley (1922 – February 1981) was an American screenwriter. He won a Primetime Emmy Award in 1972 in the category Outstanding Writing Achievement in Variety or Music for his work on the television program The Carol Burnett Show, and was nominated for seven others for The Steve Allen Show, The Bob Newhart Show, The Carol Burnett Show, The Flip Wilson Show and The Muppet Show.
