= Dandy (mascot) =

Baseball mascot

Dandy was the mascot of the New York Yankees between 1979 and 1981. He was a large pinstriped bird-like creature that sported a Yankees hat. He had a mustache that gave him an appearance similar to that of former Yankee catcher Thurman Munson. His name is a reference to the lyric "Yankee Doodle dandy" from the patriotic songs "Yankee Doodle" and "The Yankee Doodle Boy". The lyric is also the title of a 1942 film.

== Creation ==
Eager to add a mascot, Yankees management contracted Wayde Harrison and Bonnie Erickson of Acme Mascots, who created the Phillie Phanatic in 1978, to develop a mascot for their franchise. After a meeting with Yankees owner George Steinbrenner, in which Steinbrenner and Erickson argued over the shade of blue to use, the Yankees leased Dandy for three years and $30,000.

== Release and reception ==
On July 10, 1979, The San Diego Chicken, then working for the Seattle Mariners, put a hex on Yankees pitcher Ron Guidry during a game at the Seattle Kingdome. Yankees outfielder Lou Piniella responded by chasing the mascot and throwing his glove at him. In response, Steinbrenner said that mascots had no place in baseball, despite the imminent release of Dandy.

Dandy debuted in late-July 1979, weeks after the incident in Seattle. When Thurman Munson died in a plane crash on August 2, 1979, Dandy was put on hiatus, as Dandy resembled Munson. Though Yankees organist Eddie Layton composed a song for Dandy, it was never played. Dandy was confined to the upper deck area of Yankee Stadium by Yankees management. After the lease expired, Harrison and Erickson declined the Yankees' request to sign another lease, as they felt the mascot did not receive the necessary support from management.

== Aftermath ==
After Dandy was returned to Harrison and Erickson, they destroyed Dandy using an industrial shredder, an act that the creators described as "a terrible thing to have to do".

Along with this experiment, the Yankees briefly had mascots resembling ballpark food (plus Yankees hats on top) during the mid-1990s. Outside these two occasions, the Yankees have not had an official mascot or cheerleading squad roam the stands or perform on the field. Unofficial mascots have included a squirrel that Teddy Kider of The New York Times nicknamed "Right Field Ratatosk" after it was seen on the right field foul pole in late 2007. The squirrel was referred to as "Scooter" by the fans, for Yankees legendary shortstop, Phil Rizzuto, who died in August 2007. Another unofficial mascot was Bronxie the Turtle, a team pet adopted at the behest of Nestor Cortés Jr. in Fall 2021.

Though George Steinbrenner gave final approval to Dandy, he claimed had "no recollection" of Dandy in 1998. Joseph M. Perello, vice president for business development for the Yankees, and Lonn Trost, Yankees' general counsel, were unaware that the Yankees once had a mascot.

In the summer of 2023, the Yankees placed the miniature prototype of Dandy on display in their museum at Yankee Stadium. According to the museum curator, Brian Richards, the museum staff got special permission from the Yankees to display the figure. This is the first time the team has publicly acknowledged the existence of their failed mascot since 1981.
