= Peter Harris (director) =

English television director (1933–2021)

Peter Harris (1933 – 23 February 2021) was an English television director, best known for his work on The Muppet Show, Spitting Image and Bullseye.

== Life and career ==
Harris was one of just two directors on the original The Muppet Show, working on the first 73 episodes.

In 1984, Harris became the director of the British satirical television puppet show Spitting Image. He was chosen for the role due to his previous work on The Muppet Show.

During the 1980s, Harris also directed the British game show Bullseye, and coined several of the catchphrases of presenter Jim Bowen, including "Stay out of the black and in the red, there's nothing in this game for two in a bed". Behind the scenes, Harris was also tasked with finding the prizes for the show, which included a range of speedboats.

He died from COVID-19 in a nursing home in Ferndown, Dorset, on 23 February 2021, at the age of 88.
