= German Life =

Bi-monthly magazine

February / March 2007 Issue

German Life is a current bi-monthly magazine written for all people interested in the diversity of German, Austrian, and Swiss culture yesterday and today, and in the various ways that North America has been shaped by its German heritage element. The magazine is dedicated to solid reporting on cultural, historical, social, and political events.

Published by Zeitgeist Publishing Inc. from their headquarters in La Vale, Maryland, the magazine was first published in 1994.

According to WorldCat, it is held in over 265 libraries, and is included in the index Ethnic Newswatch
