= The Muppets Valentine Show =

1974 The Muppets television special

- Genre: Television special
- Created by: Jim Henson
- Written by: Jerry Juhl; Jerry Ross
- Directed by: Jim Henson
- Starring: The Muppet puppeteers: Frank Oz; Jerry Nelson; Richard Hunt; John Lovelady; Dave Goelz; Nancy McGeorge; Jane Henson; Jim Henson
- Theme music composer: Keith Textor (Music arranger and conductor); Alan Scott (Music coordinator)
- Country of origin: United States

Production
- Producer: Diana Birkenfield
- Running time: 26 minutes
- Production company: Muppets, Inc.

Original release
- Network: ABC
- Release: January 30, 1974

The Muppets Valentine Show aired on ABC on January 30, 1974. It was one of two pilots produced during the planning stages for The Muppet Show. The other pilot was The Muppet Show: Sex and Violence, which aired in 1975. In this half-hour Valentine's Day special featuring the Muppets and special guest star Mia Farrow, host Wally has writer's block—he can't think of material for the show that represents the true meaning of love. He asks the other Muppets and Mia for assistance, with mixed results.

== Sketches ==
- The Muppets perform the opening number, "Love is a Simple Thing."
- Wally, George the Janitor, Mildred and Brewster discuss love.
- Kermit the Frog tells the story of his doomed love affair with Miss Mousey, singing "Froggy Went A Courtin'"
- Mia Farrow enters, and meets the Muppets.
- Mia and Thog perform a duet, "Real Live Girl".
- Mia sings "Believe Me If All Those Endearing Young Charms" to Rufus.
- Kermit reports live from the planet Koozebane, where aliens are about to perform the Galley-oh-Hoop-Hoop.
- Mia discovers that George loves his mop.
- Mia and the Muppets sing "We Got Love".

== Home media ==
The Muppets Valentine Show was released on DVD in 2007, as an extra feature on The Muppet Show: Season Two box set. On the box and on the DVD menus, it is referred to as The Muppets Valentine Special.

The cast of Muppeteers closely matches the lineup of the first season of The Muppet Show, with the exception of Eren Ozker, who joined the Muppets in 1976.

== Muppet performers ==
- Jim Henson as Wally, Kermit, Rowlf the Dog and Ernie
- Frank Oz as George the Janitor, Rufus, Male Koozebanian Creature, Bert and Frogs
- Jerry Nelson as Droop, Thog, Miss Mousey, Female Koozebanian Creature and Frogs
- Richard Hunt as Mildred Huxtetter and Big Mouse
- John Lovelady as Crazy Donald and Frogs
- Dave Goelz as Brewster, Frogs and Crumpet

Additional Muppets performed by Jane Henson and Nancy McGeorge.
