= The Muppet Show =

1976–1981 American-British variety television series

- Genre: Sketch comedy; Surreal humour; Variety show
- Created by: Jim Henson
- Written by: Jerry Juhl (head writer); David Odell; Chris Langham; Don Hinkley; Joseph A. Bailey
- Directed by: Peter Harris; Philip Casson
- Starring: Jim Henson; Frank Oz; Jerry Nelson; Richard Hunt; Dave Goelz; Steve Whitmire; Louise Gold; Kathryn Mullen; Eren Ozker; John Lovelady
- Theme music composer: Sam Pottle
- Opening theme: "The Muppet Show Theme"
- Ending theme: "The Muppet Show Theme" (instrumental)
- Countries of origin: United Kingdom; United States
- Original language: English
- No. of seasons: 5
- No. of episodes: 120 (list of episodes)

Production
- Executive producers: Jim Henson; David Lazer
- Production locations: ATV Elstree, Borehamwood
- Camera setup: Multi-camera
- Running time: 22–26 minutes
- Production companies: Henson Associates; ITC Entertainment

Original release
- Network: ITV (UK); Syndication (US)
- Release: 5 September 1976 – 15 March 1981

Related
- Muppet Babies (1984–1991); The Jim Henson Hour (1989); Muppets Tonight (1996–1998); The Muppets (2015–2016); Muppets Now (2020)

The Muppet Show is a sketch comedy television series created by Jim Henson and starring the Muppets. The series follows the characters, led by Kermit the Frog as the showrunner and host, as they put on the eponymous variety show, featuring a rotating slate of guest stars and recurring sketches and musical numbers interspersed with ongoing storylines taking place backstage and in other areas of the venue.

The Muppet Show is known for its uniquely designed characters; burlesque nature, slapstick, absurdist and surreal humour; and parodies. As The Muppet Show became popular, many celebrities were eager to perform with the Muppets on television and in subsequent films.

Henson produced two pilot episodes for ABC in 1974 and 1975, but neither went forward as a series. While other networks in the United States rejected Henson's proposals, British producer Lew Grade expressed enthusiasm for the project and agreed to co-produce The Muppet Show for ATV, part of the UK ITV channel. The Muppet Show was produced by ITC Entertainment and Henson Associates with programmes produced and recorded at the ATV Elstree Studios in Borehamwood, Hertfordshire.

The series was premiered in the UK on 5 September 1976 and ended on 15 March 1981. Five seasons, totalling 120 episodes, were broadcast on ATV and other ITV franchises in the UK and in first-run syndication in the United States from 1976 to 1981.

The cast of performers over the course of the series included Henson, Frank Oz (credited as featured performer as well as creative consultant), Jerry Nelson, Richard Hunt, Dave Goelz, Steve Whitmire, Fran Brill, Eren Özker, Louise Gold, Kathryn Mullen, Karen Prell, Brian Muehl, Bob Payne, John Lovelady, Jane Henson, Peter Friedman, and dancers Betsy Baytos and Graham Fletcher. Many of the performers also worked on Sesame Street, whose characters made sporadic appearances on The Muppet Show. Jack Burns served as the head writer for the first season, before Jerry Juhl became the head writer from the second season. The music was performed by ATV's musical director Jack Parnell and his orchestra.

The rights to the series have been owned by the Muppets Studio (a division of the Walt Disney Company) since the Muppets were acquired from the Jim Henson Company in 2004.

== History ==
Since its debut in 1969, Sesame Street had given Jim Henson's Muppet characters exposure. However, he began to perceive that he was becoming typecast as a children's entertainer. Subsequently, he began to conceive a programme for a more adult audience. Two television specials, The Muppets Valentine Show (1974) and The Muppet Show: Sex and Violence (1975), were produced for ABC and are considered pilots for The Muppet Show. Neither of them were ordered to series. However, the prime-time access rule had been recently enacted, moving the 7:30 to 8 pm ET slot from the networks to their affiliates. CBS became interested in Henson's series proposals and expressed intent to broadcast it weekly on its owned and operated stations. According to Henson's pitch reel, George Schlatter was originally involved.

Lew Grade, the proprietor of the British commercial franchise-holder ATV, was familiar with puppet television programmes, having underwritten the various works of Gerry Anderson, while also producing two specials with Henson: Julie on Sesame Street and a special on Herb Alpert & the Tijuana Brass. Grade offered Henson a deal that resulted in the latter's programme being produced at the ATV Elstree Studios. ATV, as part of the ITV channel, would provide the programme for broadcast in other ITV regions in the United Kingdom, and its distribution arm, ITC Entertainment, would handle international broadcasts. Henson set aside his misgivings about syndication and accepted.

Meanwhile, Henson's Muppets were featured in The Land of Gorch skits during the first season (1975–76) of the American comedy television programme Saturday Night Live. Although they did not last due to conflicts with the show's writers and producers, Henson and his team gained institutional knowledge about adapting and quickly creating a television programme within a seven-day period. Henson also gained friendships with multiple celebrities through his work on Saturday Night Live. Henson and his team were later able to use these skills and relationships on The Muppet Show.

The Muppet Show was first aired in September 1976 in the UK and by December the series had around 14 million viewers tuning in on Sunday evenings. In January 1977, over 100 countries had either acquired the series or were making offers, which had resulted in over £6 million in overseas sales and by its third season in 1978 it had a weekly worldwide audience of 235 million.

== Overview ==
=== Opening and closing sequences ===
"The Muppet Show Theme" (written by Henson and Sam Pottle in 1976) is the show's theme song. While the opening sequence changed from season to season, the overall concept remained the same. Each episode began with "The Muppet Show" logo on a title card. The centre of the "O" then opened to reveal host Kermit the Frog, who announced, "It's The Muppet Show, with our very special guest star, [name of guest star]!" usually cheering afterwards.

During the first season, the theme song contained a joke from Fozzie Bear and featured Kermit introducing the guest star ("To introduce our guest star, that's what I'm here to do, so it really makes me happy to introduce to you..."). At the song's end, Gonzo the Great appeared in front of the "Muppet Show" banner, attempting to play the "O" in "Show" like a gong, with various comical results.

From the second to fourth seasons, the joke and Kermit's introduction were replaced by a short quip from Statler and Waldorf, then a shot of the audience singing "Why don't they get things started?" The fifth season version had an extra verse from the hecklers ("Why do we always come here? I guess we'll never know. It's like a kind of torture to have to watch the show!"). At the end of the song, Gonzo appeared inside the "O" in "Show" to play the final note on a trumpet; again, with various comical results.

Each episode ended with an extended instrumental performance of "The Muppet Show Theme" by the Muppet orchestra before Statler and Waldorf gave their last comment of the night, followed by Zoot playing an off-key final note on his saxophone. These last comment sequences would sometimes include other Muppets on the balcony.

Every season, the TV version of the song was presented with re-worked lyrics. While the opening sequence evolved visually over the show's five seasons, the musical composition remained essentially the same. Over the years, the song has become a staple of the Muppets franchise as a whole.

=== Muppet Theater ===
The Muppet Theater is the setting for The Muppet Show, a grand old vaudeville house that has seen better days. In a 1976 episode guest starring Jim Nabors, Kermit identifies the name of the theatre as The Benny Vandergast Memorial Theater, although other episodes identify it as "the Muppet Theater". Locations seen in the Muppet Theater include backstage left (which includes Kermit's desk), the dressing rooms, the attic, the canteen, the prop room, the stage, Statler and Waldorf's box, the auditorium, reception, the recording studio, the stage door lobby and the boiler room. Scooter's uncle J.P. Grosse owns the theatre and rents it to the Muppets.

=== Characters and performers ===
Many of the characters who appeared on The Muppet Show have appeared in previous and subsequent Muppet productions.

=== Guest stars ===
No guest star ever appeared twice on The Muppet Show. Originally, the producers had to call on their personal contacts to appeal to them to appear, considering that doing so required an overseas trip to Britain. However, the situation changed when the ballet dancer Rudolf Nureyev offered to appear; after his performance in a Season 2 episode produced favourable publicity, celebrities sought to appear in the series.

Many episodes featured actors, such as Gilda Radner, Steve Martin, Harvey Korman, Sylvester Stallone, Julie Andrews, Carol Burnett, Liza Minnelli, Christopher Reeve, Raquel Welch, Joel Grey and Dom DeLuise; some had veteran performers like Ethel Merman, Bob Hope, Danny Kaye, Don Knotts, Liberace, Peter Ustinov, James Coburn, Lena Horne, Zero Mostel and Vincent Price, and others had well-known pop singers, including Elton John, Diana Ross, Harry Belafonte, Kenny Rogers, Linda Ronstadt, Alice Cooper, Paul Simon, Helen Reddy, Twiggy, Debbie Harry, Buddy Rich, and Leo Sayer. Sayer's show used his hit song "The Show Must Go On" with slightly changed lyrics in the second verse, from "I wish I could tear down the walls of this theatre" to "I wish I could tear down the walls of this Muppet Theatre". Some guest stars, such as the Monty Python star John Cleese, co-wrote much of their own episodes. The second-to-last episode, in 1981, had the then-James Bond actor Roger Moore, while the final episode to be taped guest-starred the actor and dancer Gene Kelly. Mark Hamill appeared in one episode as both himself and Luke Skywalker, his role in the Star Wars film series. Two of Henson's childhood idols, Edgar Bergen and Milton Berle, also guest-starred during the second season.

In 1977, Rita Moreno won the Primetime Emmy Award for Outstanding Individual Performance in a Variety or Music Program for her appearance. The next year, Peter Sellers — who chose not to appear as himself, instead appearing in a variety of characters — and Bernadette Peters earned nominations for the same award. One 1981 episode had the staff writer Chris Langham (who wrote some episodes of the show, starting in the third season) guest-starring when Richard Pryor was unable to make the taping of the episode at the last minute.

An early tradition was to present the guest star with a Muppet likeness of themselves as a parting gift at the end of the show. This lasted for the first two episodes produced, with Connie Stevens and Juliet Prowse. The high cost and effort of creating these unique Muppets, scheduling conflicts, and potential legal issues contributed to the decline of this practice, although Muppet caricatures and parodies continued to appear.

== Recurring sketches ==
Fozzie Bear (left) and Rowlf the Dog (right) perform "An English Country Garden" in a 1978 episode guest starring Elton John

- "At the Dance" – The sketch was a regular during the first season but was used less frequently from the second season onward. Muppet characters (some of them being Whatnots) circulated on a semi-formal dance floor offering rapid fire one-liner jokes and come-backs as the couples passed in front of the camera. Debuted in The Muppet Show: Sex and Violence, and played a large role in the plot for a season five episode.
- "Bear on Patrol" – Fozzie Bear is a luckless police officer named Patrol Bear and Link Hogthrob is the incompetent chief of police who are always in the silliest situations with the criminals brought in. The voice of the announcer was performed by Jerry Nelson. Debuted in the third season.
- "Blackouts" – Short, comic sketches with the show's guest star traditional to vaudeville that end with the lights turning off or a quick closing of the curtain. Only appeared in the first season.
- "Cold Openings" – The Cold Openings appeared at the beginning of each episode and officially introduced the guest star. During the first season, Kermit introduced the guest star during the opening theme. His introduction was followed by a clip of the guest star, usually surrounded by a group of Muppets. Beginning in the second season, the Cold Openings appeared before the opening theme song. Scooter visited the guest star in their dressing room, usually saying "Fifteen seconds to curtain". This was then followed by a brief joke. In the fifth season, the guest star entered the Muppet Theatre and was greeted by Pops the Doorman. Pops always said, "Who are you?" as soon as he saw the guest star. After the guest star introduced themself to Pops, a joke would follow.
- "An Editorial by Sam the Eagle" – Sam the Eagle gives an editorial on a specific topic which ends up occurring during the editorial. Only appeared in the second season.
- "The Electric Mayhem" – A variety of musical sketches featuring Dr. Teeth and the Electric Mayhem.
- "Fozzie Bear's Act" – Fozzie Bear goes on stage and tells jokes. Statler and Waldorf heckle him in a perpetual rivalry. The sketches became less frequent as Fozzie's off-stage presence became more prevalent. In one first-season episode, however, Fozzie, with help from Bruce Forsyth, turned the tables on Statler and Waldorf who waved a white flag in surrender. It mainly appeared during the first season, but made occasional appearances in later seasons.
- "Gonzo's Stunts" – These sketches detail the stunts of The Great Gonzo where something would usually go wrong.
- "Muppet Labs" – These segments featured the latest invention from Dr. Bunsen Honeydew with his assistant Beaker having the worst of its inevitable malfunction. During the first season, Honeydew hosted Muppet Labs by himself. The writers soon realised that another character was necessary to show his failings, which resulted in Beaker being introduced in season two (1977).
- "Muppet Melodrama" – A sketch where Uncle Deadly captured Miss Piggy and put her in perilous plights to force her to marry him. Wayne would often have to be the one to save her. Only appeared in the third season.
- "Muppet News Flash" – The Muppet Newsman delivers a news brief about a bizarre incident or human-interest story. During the first season, these segments frequently had an interview with the episode's guest star, who portrayed a person connected to the story. Beginning with the second season, the Muppet Newsman almost invariably suffered some calamity associated with the story.
- "Muppet Sports" – A sports sketch that features different sporting activities that are covered by Louis Kazagger. Debuted in the third season.
- "Musical Chickens" – A flock of Muppet chickens pecked the keys of a piano and played a classic song to show off their musical talents.
- "Panel Discussions" – A sketch where Kermit the Frog, the guest star and other Muppets discuss various topics. Only appeared in the first season.
- "Pigs in Space" – Parody of science fiction programmes like Star Trek, but also 1930s sci-fi serials. The spacecraft is called USS Swinetrek and the title voice-over is a parody of Lost in Space. It features Captain Link Hogthrob, Dr. Julius Strangepork (the name a take-off on "Dr. Strangelove"), and Miss Piggy as First Mate. Usually, the sketches involved Piggy putting up with Strangepork and Link who considered her to be inferior to them because she is a female. The early sketches usually had introductions for all the characters, such as calling Link the "flappable captain", Miss Piggy the "flirtatious first mate", and referring to Dr. Strangepork as "describable". This portion of the introduction was dropped during season three, and the announcer simply claimed it was "time for...Piiiiiigs...iiiin...spaaaaaaace!" Debuted in the second season.
- "Planet Koozebane" – A sketch about a planet containing strange alien lifeforms like the Koozebanian creatures, the Koozebanian Phoob, the Fazoobs, the Koozebanian Spooble, the Four Fazoobs and the Merdlidops. This was a common stop for the Swinetrek crew.
- "A Poem by Rowlf" – Rowlf the Dog recited a classic poem while other Muppets interrupt him. Only appeared in the first season.
- "Rowlf at the Piano" – Rowlf the Dog would sing classical songs and would occasionally be accompanied by the other Muppet characters.
- "The Swedish Chef" – A cooking show parody. It consists of the Swedish Chef, who speaks mock Swedish, semi-comprehensible gibberish which parodies the characteristic vowel sounds and intonation of Swedish. He attempts to cook a dish with great enthusiasm until the punchline hits. Jim Henson performed the Chef's head and voice, and Frank Oz performed the Chef's hands. One of them would often improvise something, making the other puppeteer comply with the action. Debuted in the pilot "Sex and Violence".
- "Talk Spots" – While sitting on a wall, Kermit the Frog talked to the guest star and was occasionally joined by the other Muppets. Mostly appeared during the first season, but made occasional appearances during the second season, and made two appearances in the third season (one of which had Sam the Eagle and the Swedish Chef in place of Kermit).
- "Talking Houses" – A bunch of houses that tell jokes to each other. Only appeared during the first season.
- "UK Spots" – Due to shorter commercial breaks in the United Kingdom, every episode of The Muppet Show lasted two minutes longer in the UK than in the United States. The extra segments that were filmed to cover this time difference have been referred to as "UK Spots". Most of these consisted of a short song and never featured the guest star.
- "Vendaface" – The Vendaface (voiced by Jerry Nelson) is a vending machine that can give any Muppet a facelift. Apparently, Vendaface was only meant to be used once, but David Lazer said that they should not build such an expensive puppet only to use it once. The writers then decided to have him on the show a few more times in the first season. The Vendaface later appeared as the Vendawish (voiced by Nelson) which was a wish-granting machine, in a 1979 episode guest starring Leslie Uggams and Big Bird.
- "Veterinarian's Hospital" – Parody of the soap opera General Hospital and other medical dramas, this segment consists of Dr. Bob (played by Rowlf the Dog) cracking jokes in the operating room with Nurses Piggy and Janice, much to the bemusement of the frazzled patient. Each instalment ends with Dr. Bob and his nurses looking around in puzzlement as a disembodied announcer tells viewers to "tune in next time, when you'll hear Nurse Piggy / Dr. Bob / Nurse Janice say....", whereupon one of the three 'medics' will prompt a response from one of the others. On a number of occasions, the "Veterinarian's Hospital" sketch crossed over with the cast or set of another, such as "At the Dance" or "Pigs in Space". On one occasion, Dr. Bob was the patient while the guest star (Christopher Reeve) played a doctor going to operate on Dr. Bob, and once Nurse Piggy was replaced by guest star Loretta Swit, parodying her Nurse Houlihan character from M*A*S*H. In the first series, the announcement was usually performed by John Lovelady, but Jerry Nelson performed the role in the 1976 episodes guest starring Harvey Korman and Rita Moreno, before taking over the role permanently in an episode guest starring Phyllis Diller that same year.
- "Wayne and Wanda" – Each sketch had Wayne and Wanda singing a song, only to be interrupted by some sort of pun relating to a lyric. Sam the Eagle introduced these sketches, as he felt that they were among the few cultured aspects of the show. Only appeared during the first season, although a few new sketches appeared in later seasons with just Wayne.

== Cast ==
=== The Muppet Performers ===
- Jim Henson as Kermit the Frog, Rowlf the Dog, Waldorf, The Swedish Chef, Dr. Teeth, Link Hogthrob, The Newsman, Nigel (season 1, occasional), Mahna Mahna, and others
- Frank Oz as Miss Piggy (Season 1, occasional; Seasons 2-5, full-time), Fozzie Bear, Animal, Sam the Eagle, George the Janitor, Marvin Suggs, Mildred Huxtetter (Season 1, occasional), The Snowths, The Swedish Chef (hands), and others
- Jerry Nelson as Floyd Pepper, Robin the Frog, Camilla the Chicken, Lew Zealand, Dr. Julius Strangepork, Pops, Crazy Harry (Seasons 2-5), Uncle Deadly, Louis Kazagger, Miss Mousey, Thog, Vendaface, The Announcer (Season 1, occasional; Seasons 2-5, full-time) and others
- Richard Hunt as Scooter, Statler, Janice (Seasons 2-5), Beaker, Sweetums, Wayne, Miss Piggy (Season 1, occasional), Mildred Huxtetter (Season 1, occasional), and others
- Dave Goelz as Gonzo, Dr. Bunsen Honeydew, Zoot, Beauregard, Brewster, and others
- Louise Gold (Seasons 2–5) as Annie Sue and others
- Steve Whitmire (Seasons 3–5) as Rizzo the Rat, Lips, Foo-Foo, and others
- Kathryn Mullen (Seasons 3–5) as Gaffer and others
- Eren Ozker (Season 1) as Hilda, Wanda, Janice (Season 1), and others
- John Lovelady (Season 1) as Crazy Harry (Season 1), Nigel (Season 1, occasional), The Announcer (Season 1, occasional; Seasons 2-5, full-time), and others
- Fran Brill (Season 1, occasional) as Mary Louise (episode 108) and "I Feel Pretty" singer (episode 109)
- Jane Henson (Season 1, occasional) as additional Muppets (credited in episode 103)
- Peter Friedman (Season 1, Season 3) as Seven-foot-tall Talking Carrot (episode 304) and others
- Cynthia Adler (Season 1, occasional) as Cynthia Birdley and others
- Rollie Krewson (Season 1, occasional) as Mary Louise (episode 114) and others
- Graham Fletcher (Seasons 2-4) as Fletcher Bird and others
- Bob Payne (Season 3-5, occasional) as Astoria and others
- Betsy Baytos (Season 5, occasional) as Betsy Bird and others
- Karen Prell (Season 5, occasional) as additional Muppets
- Brian Muehl (Season 5, occasional) as additional Muppets

== Episodes ==
The Muppet Show ran for five seasons, with minor alterations taking place each season.

== Soundtracks ==
The Muppet Show

Chart (1977/78)	Peak position
Australia (Kent Music Report)	39
UK Albums (Official Charts)	1

The Muppet Show - Volume 2

Chart (1978)	Peak position
UK Albums (Official Charts)	16

Singles

Year	Chart	Single	Position
1977	UK Singles Chart	"Halfway Down The Stairs"	7
1977	UK Singles Chart	"The Muppet Show Music Hall EP"	19

== Awards and nominations ==
The Muppet Show was nominated for nine BAFTA Awards during its run, winning three. It was nominated for 22 Primetime Emmy Awards, winning four, including the 1978 award for Outstanding Comedy-Variety or Music Series. It was presented with a Peabody Award in 1978. Also in 1978, the show received the Television Award of Merit from the Mary Washington Colonial Chapter of the National Society of the Daughters of the American Revolution.

The series also won the top Variety Prize in the Golden Rose of Montreux international Contest in May 1977.

=== Primetime Emmy Awards ===
Year	Category	Nominee(s)	Episode	Result
1977	Outstanding Comedy – Variety or Music Series	Jim Henson, David Lazer, Jack Burns, Frank Oz, Richard Hunt, Dave Goelz, Eren Ozker, John Lovelady and Jerry Nelson		Nominated
1977	Outstanding Writing in a Comedy-Variety or Music Series	Jerry Juhl, Marc London	"Paul Williams"	Nominated
1977	Outstanding Continuing or Single Performance by a Supporting Actress in Variety or Music	Rita Moreno	"Rita Moreno"	Won
1978	Outstanding Comedy – Variety or Music Series	David Lazer, Jim Henson, Frank Oz, Jerry Nelson, Richard Hunt and Dave Goelz		Won
1978	Outstanding Directing in a Comedy-Variety or Music Series	Peter Harris	"Elton John"	Nominated
1978	Outstanding Writing in a Comedy-Variety or Music Series	Jim Henson, Jerry Juhl, Don Hinkley & Joseph A. Bailey	"Dom DeLuise"	Nominated
1978	Outstanding Continuing or Single Performance by a Supporting Actor in Variety or Music	Peter Sellers	"Peter Sellers"	Nominated
1978	Outstanding Continuing or Single Performance by a Supporting Actress in Variety or Music	Bernadette Peters	"Bernadette Peters"	Nominated
1979	Outstanding Comedy – Variety or Music Series	David Lazer, Jim Henson, Frank Oz, Jerry Nelson, Richard Hunt and Dave Goelz		Nominated
1980	Outstanding Comedy – Variety or Music Series	David Lazer, Jim Henson, Dave Goelz, Louise Gold, Richard Hunt, Kathryn Mullen, Jerry Nelson, Frank Oz and Steve Whitmire		Nominated
1980	Outstanding Directing in a Comedy-Variety or Music Series	Peter Harris	"Liza Minnelli"	Nominated
1980	Outstanding Writing in a Comedy-Variety or Music Series	Jim Henson, Jerry Juhl, Don Hinkley & David Odell	"Alan Arkin"	Nominated
1980	Outstanding Video Tape Editing for a Series	John Hawkins	"Liza Minnelli"	Won
1980	Outstanding Art Direction for a Variety or Music Program	Malcolm Stone	"Beverly Sills"	Nominated
1980	Outstanding Costume Design for a Series	Calista Hendrickson	"Beverly Sills"	Nominated
1980	Outstanding Individual Achievement – Creative Technical Crafts	Leslee Asch, Edward G. Christie, Barbara S. Davis, Faz Fazakas, Nomi Frederick, Michael K. Frith, Amy Van Gilder, Dave Goelz, Marianne Harms, Larry Jameson, Mari Kaestle, Rollin Krewson, Tim Miller, Bob Payne, Jan Rosenthal, Don Sahlin, Caroly Wilcox	"Alan Arkin"	Nominated
1980	Outstanding Individual Achievement – Creative Technical Crafts	Edward G. Christie, Barbara S. Davis, Faz Fazakas, Nomi Frederick, Michael K. Frith, Amy Van Gilder, Dave Goelz, Larry Jameson, Mari Kaestle, Rollin Krewson, Tim Miller, Bob Payne, Jan Rosenthal, Don Sahlin, Caroly Wilcox	"Kenny Rogers"	Nominated
1981	Outstanding Comedy – Variety or Music Series	David Lazer, Jim Henson, Frank Oz, Jerry Nelson, Richard Hunt, Dave Goelz, Louise Gold, Steve Whitmire, Kathryn Mullen, Brian Muehl and Karen Prell		Nominated
1981	Outstanding Writing in a Comedy-Variety or Music Series	Jerry Juhl, David Odell, Chris Langham	"Carol Burnett"	Won
1981	Outstanding Video Tape Editing for a Series	John Hawkins	"Brooke Shields"	Nominated
1981	Outstanding Art Direction for a Variety or Music Program	Malcolm Stone	"Brooke Shields"	Nominated

=== Others ===
Year	Association	Category	Nominee(s)	Result
1977	British Academy Television Awards (BAFTA)	Best Light Entertainment Programme	The Muppet Show	Won
1977	British Academy Television Awards (BAFTA)	'Harlequin (Drama/Light Entertainment)	The Muppet Show	Nominated
1978	British Academy Television Awards (BAFTA)	Most Original Programme/Series	Jim Henson	Won
1978	British Academy Television Awards (BAFTA)	Best Light Entertainment Programme/Series	Jim Henson	Nominated
1978	British Academy Television Awards (BAFTA)	Best VTR Editor	John Hawkins & Tim Waddell	Nominated
1978	British Academy Television Awards (BAFTA)	Best Design	David Chandler & Bryan Holgate	Nominated
1979	British Academy Television Awards (BAFTA)	Best Light Entertainment Programme/Series	Jim Henson	Nominated
1979	British Academy Television Awards (BAFTA)	Best VTR Editor	John Hawkins	Won
1980	British Academy Television Awards (BAFTA)	Best Light Entertainment Programme/Series	Jim Henson	Nominated
1979	Grammy Awards	Best Recording for Children	Jim Henson	Won
1979	Peabody Awards		Henson Associates	Won
1979	Golden Camera	Best Entertainment Show	Jim Henson	Won
1977	Rose d'Or Light Entertainment Festival	Golden Rose		Won
1981	Young Artist Awards	Best TV Series for Family Entertainment		Nominated

== Home media ==
=== Compilation releases ===
In 1985, Playhouse Video released a collection of video compilations under the Jim Henson's Muppet Video banner. Ten videos were released, featuring original linking material in addition to clips from the show.

Videos included:

- The Muppet Revue (titled Kermit and Fozzie's Favourite Moments in the UK) – Hosted by Kermit and Fozzie as they clean up the attic, with guest stars Linda Ronstadt, Paul Williams, Harry Belafonte, and Rita Moreno
- The Kermit and Piggy Story – Hosted by Kermit and Miss Piggy as they reminisce over their moments on the show, with guest stars Raquel Welch, Tony Randall, Cheryl Ladd, and Loretta Swit
- Children's Songs and Stories with the Muppets – Hosted by Scooter as he looks through a scrapbook of children's songs from the show, with interruptions by other Muppet characters (all voiced by Jim Henson) as he constantly tries to introduce his favorite song, "Six String Orchestra", with guest stars Julie Andrews, John Denver, Twiggy, Brooke Shields, Judy Collins, and Charles Aznavour
- Rock Music with the Muppets – Hosted by Dr. Teeth with assistance by Beaker in a recording studio, with guest stars Debbie Harry, Linda Ronstadt, Alice Cooper, Ben Vereen, Helen Reddy, Leo Sayer, Loretta Swit, and Paul Simon
- Muppet Treasures – Hosted by Kermit and Fozzie as they once again clean out the attic, with guest stars Zero Mostel, Loretta Lynn, Paul Simon, Buddy Rich, Peter Sellers, and Ethel Merman
- Gonzo Presents Muppet Weird Stuff – Hosted by Gonzo and Camilla at Gonzo's trailer home, which Gonzo tries to pass off as a mansion, with guest stars John Cleese, Jean Stapleton, Dom DeLuise, Julie Andrews, Vincent Price, and Madeline Kahn
- Country Music with the Muppets – Hosted by Rowlf at a barnyard radio station, with guest stars Mac Davis, John Denver, Crystal Gayle, Loretta Lynn, Roger Miller, Roy Clark, Johnny Cash, Roy Rogers, and Dale Evans
- Muppet Moments – Once again hosted by Kermit and Fozzie as they clean the attic, with guest stars Pearl Bailey, Bernadette Peters, Lena Horne, Andy Williams, Zero Mostel, and Liza Minnelli
- Rowlf's Rhapsodies with the Muppets – Hosted by Rowlf, with guest stars Marisa Berenson, Peter Sellers, George Burns, Petula Clark, and Steve Martin
- Fozzie's Muppet Scrapbook – Hosted by Fozzie in the attic as he looks through a scrapbook of his material from the show, with guest stars Raquel Welch, Beverly Sills, and Milton Berle

In 1993, Jim Henson Video released two compilations under the It's the Muppets banner, Meet the Muppets and More Muppets, Please! Later, three volumes of The Very Best of The Muppet Show were released on VHS and DVD in the UK (volume 3 was a release of full episodes as opposed to compilations). Unlike the Playhouse Video releases, It's the Muppets and The Very Best of The Muppet Show did not include any original footage or guest star clips, but all compilation collections did include material cut from the original US broadcasts.

=== Series releases ===
In 1994, Buena Vista Home Video under the Jim Henson Video imprint released The Muppet Show: Monster Laughs with Vincent Price, featuring the episodes with Vincent Price and Alice Cooper. Both episodes were edited. In addition to replacing the first series opening and the ending logos with Zoot, the Vincent Price episode was edited to remove the songs "I'm Looking Through You" and "You've Got a Friend" (the latter of which would be cut again when released on the first series DVD) as well as a sketch with the Talking Houses, while the Alice Cooper episode removed Robin the Frog's performance of "Somewhere Over the Rainbow".

Time-Life and Jim Henson Home Entertainment began marketing "best of" volumes of The Muppet Show for mail-order in 2000, with six initial volumes with three episodes on each VHS and DVD. Unique to each episode was an introduction by Jim Henson's son, Brian. Nine more volumes were added for 2001, the series' 25th anniversary. The collection was available for retail in 2002 via Columbia TriStar Home Entertainment and Jim Henson Home Entertainment by which time Time-Life had released its tenth volume.

Buena Vista Home Entertainment released the first three seasons on DVD between 2005 and 2008. The rights to the episodes and characters used in The Muppet Show, and subsequent film outings, were bought in February 2004 by The Walt Disney Company.

Several songs were cut from the series 1 DVD release due to music licensing issues. There have also been some cuts in the intro sequence, and backstage scenes leading up to these songs. However, episodes that used Disney music remained unaltered (for example, episode 14 of series 1 used "Never Smile at a Crocodile" from Disney Animation's 1953 film Peter Pan).

- "Stormy Weather" (Joel Grey episode) sung by Wayne and Wanda
- "Gone with the Wind" (Jim Nabors episode) sung by Jim Nabors
- "The Danceros" (Jim Nabors episode) sung by The Danceros
- "All of Me" (Paul Williams episode) sung by Two Monsters
- "Old Fashioned Way" (Charles Aznavour episode) sung by Charles Aznavour with Mildred Huxtetter
- "You've Got A Friend" (Vincent Price episode) sung by Vincent Price, Uncle Deadly and a chorus of Muppet Monsters

The only uncut release of Season 1 on DVD so far is the German DVD release by Buena Vista Home Entertainment Germany in 2010 (which also contains English audio). However, the intro and end credit sequences on this release are in German. Also, the Paul Williams episode is missing a scene following "All of Me" wherein Fozzie and Scooter first discuss the "Old Telephone Pole bit". This scene does appear (albeit slightly abridged) in the international release. The German version also lacks the song "In My Life" performed by Twiggy, instead replacing it with a performance of "Lean on Me" by German singer Mary Roos.

DVD name	Ep #	Release date	Content
Season One (1976–1977)	24	9 August 2005	Season 1 (1976–1977) episodes; The original pilot, The Muppet Show: Sex and Violence; The original pitch reel of the show; Muppet morsels viewing mode with pop-up facts; Promo gag reel
Season Two (1977–1978)	24	7 August 2007	Season 2 (1977–1978) episodes; The original pilot, The Muppets Valentine Show; The Muppets on the Muppets (interviews); Weezer & The Muppets (music video)
Season Three (1978–1979)	24	20 May 2008	Season 3 (1978–1979) episodes; "A Company of Players" (documentary); "The Muppets on Puppets" (documentary); Purina Dog Chow commercials with Rowlf

=== Streaming ===
The Muppet Show was released for streaming on Disney+ on 19 February 2021. However, two episodes featuring guests Brooke Shields and Chris Langham are omitted from the streaming service. In several European countries, the episode with John Denver is omitted as well. A content advisory was attached to several episodes describing "negative depictions and/or mistreatment of people or cultures".

== In other media ==
=== 2001: The Muppet Show Live! ===
During the 2001 MuppetFest celebration, The Muppet Show Live was staged at the Hollywood Palace in Hollywood, Los Angeles on 9 December 2001. The performance featured Steve Whitmire, Brian Henson, Bill Barretta, Kevin Clash, John Kennedy, John Henson, and Julianne Buescher.

Additional puppeteers including Allan Trautman, Bruce Lanoil, Drew Massey, Karen Prell and Mike Quinn.

=== 2026: Revival special ===
On 17 September 2025, Disney announced that an untitled "event special" for The Muppet Show was being produced for Disney+, to premiere on 4 February 2026 to coincide with the show's 50th anniversary, and would also serve as a backdoor pilot for a potential revival/reboot of the original series. The special was described as "Kermit the Frog, Miss Piggy, Fozzie Bear, Gonzo and the gang as they return to the Muppet Theatre to produce a variety show." The special starred Muppet performers Bill Barretta, Dave Goelz, Eric Jacobson, Peter Linz, David Rudman and Matt Vogel performing the majority of the Muppet characters, alongside a supporting cast of additional performers; Goelz reprised most of the same character roles he originated during the show's original 1976–1981 run. The special was directed by Alex Timbers and featured special guest stars Sabrina Carpenter, Maya Rudolph and Seth Rogen. In addition, Carpenter and Rogen also served as executive producers alongside Evan Goldberg, Vogel, Jacobson, David Lightbody, Leigh Slaughter, Michael Steinbach, Albertina Rizzo, James Weaver and Alex McAtee.

The special was co-produced by 20th Television, Disney Branded Television, The Muppets Studio, and Point Grey Pictures.

== See also ==
- Adult puppeteering
