= The Christmas Toy =

1986 The Muppets film

- 1998 VHS cover to the special
- Also known as: The Muppets Christmas Toy
- Genre: Family; Fantasy; Musical
- Based on: Kermit the Frog by Jim Henson
- Written by: Laura Phillips
- Directed by: Eric Till
- Starring: Dave Goelz; Steve Whitmire; Kathryn Mullen; Jerry Nelson; Richard Hunt; Camille Bonora; Jack Riley; Jim Henson
- Music by: Jeff Moss; Dick Lieb
- Country of origin: United States
- Original language: English

Production
- Executive producer: Diana Birkenfield
- Producers: Jim Henson; Martin G. Baker
- Production locations: Toronto, Ontario, Canada
- Editor: Geoff Craigen
- Running time: 50 minutes
- Production company: Henson Associates

Original release
- Network: ABC
- Release: December 6, 1986

The Christmas Toy is a 1986 television film directed by Eric Till and produced by The Jim Henson Company, featuring Jim Henson's Muppets, including Rugby the Tiger, who remembers being last year's Christmas Toy and thinks that he will be unwrapped again this year. The film, which originally aired on December 6, 1986, on ABC, was sponsored by Kraft Foods.

Originally introduced by Kermit the Frog, it was released on VHS format in 1993. In 2008, HIT Entertainment, distributed by Lionsgate, released the special on DVD, with Kermit's opening introduction edited out due to legal issues with The Walt Disney Company, which had owned the rights to him since 2004. When the film was released on Amazon Prime, Kermit's scenes were restored.

The film later inspired a spin-off television series, Secret Life of Toys (1994).

== Plot ==
When people are not around, toys come to life to play, but they must be careful because if a person catches them out of position, they will be frozen forever. On Christmas Eve, Rugby the Tiger remembers that he was last year's favorite Christmas toy and wants to keep that position rather than be replaced by another toy. However, he does not realize that if Jamie were to unwrap him again, she would see him out of his normal place and he would freeze. Mew, the cat's toy mouse, follows him out of the playroom to help him after informing the other toys that he has left.

Apple the Doll, whom Rugby had replaced as favorite toy, leads a group of toys out of the playroom to rescue him. Once they meet up with him in the living room, Apple tries to tell him what Christmas is truly about, but Rugby refuses to believe her. As he tries to get into the Christmas package, he releases Meteora, Queen of the Asteroids, who is unaware that she is a toy and thinks that she has landed among aliens. The other toys hurry to get Rugby out of the box and Meteora back in before they are found and frozen forever.

However, after Mew is caught and frozen, Rugby realizes what a good friend Mew has been to him and how he had been acting selfishly. Rugby sings, telling Mew how much he cares for him. This brings Mew back to life, and the toys revive their frozen friends.

On Christmas Day, Jamie and Jesse enjoy their new toys along with their current toys. While they are away, the toys and Kermit sing "Together at Christmas".

== Cast ==
Actor	Role
Marsha Moreau	Jamie Jones
Zachary Bennett	Jesse Jones
Diana Birkenfield	Mrs. Jones
Jack Riley	Mr. Jones

=== Muppet performers ===
Actor	Role
Dave Goelz	Rugby Tiger, Ditz
Steve Whitmire	Mew, Dauntless Dragon
Kathryn Mullen	Apple
Jerry Nelson	Balthazar
Richard Hunt	Belmont
Camille Bonora	Meteora, Molly Jones (voice)
Brian Henson	Cruiser
Rob Mills	Bleep
Nikki Tilroe	Ding-a-ling
Jim Henson	Jack-in-the-Box, Kermit the Frog (uncredited)

== Advertising ==
The original broadcast of The Christmas Toy featured four 90-second commercials, plus two shorter spots at the special's beginning and end, for Kraft Foods. The four main spots, narrated by Ed Herlihy, provided abridged recipes for foods one could make using a specific Kraft product for Christmas and New Years' celebrations. The full recipes were printed in the December 6, 1986 issue of TV Guide.

== See also ==
- List of Christmas films
- Toy Story
