= Eric Roberts filmography =

Filmography

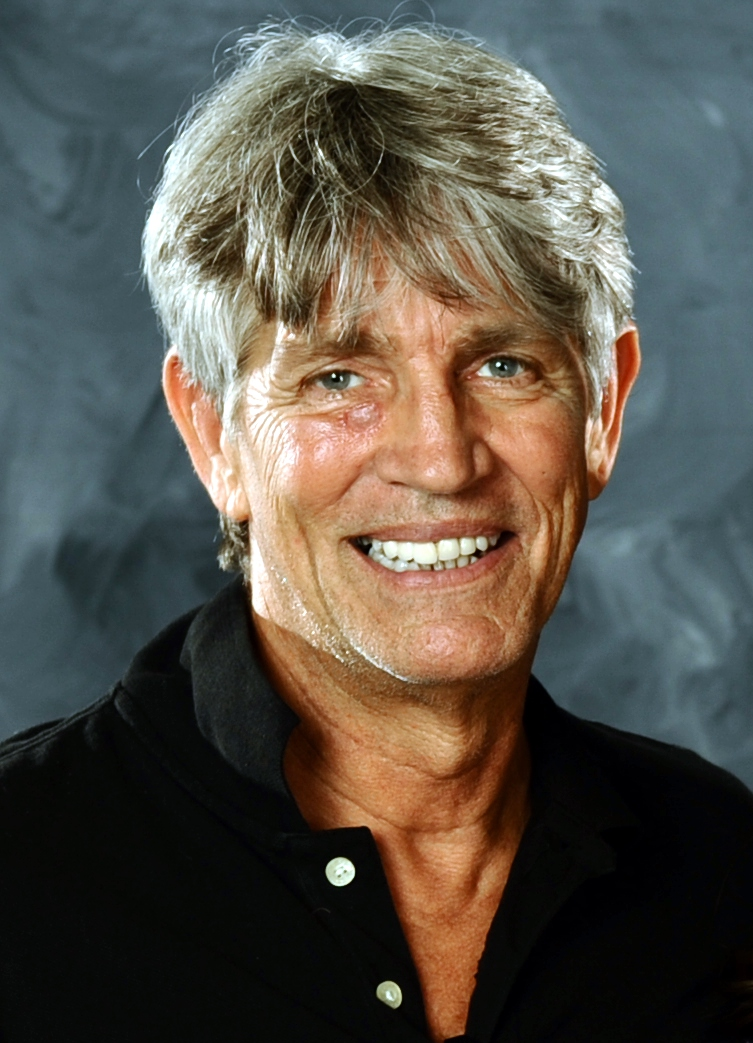
Roberts in 2015

Eric Roberts (born April 18, 1956) is an American actor. His career began with King of the Gypsies (1978), earning a Golden Globe Award nomination for Best Actor Debut. He earned both a Golden Globe and Academy Award nomination for his supporting role in Runaway Train (1985).

Through the 1990s and 2000s, he maintained dramatic film and TV film roles while appearing in TV series. His TV work includes playing the Master in the 1996 Doctor Who TV movie, three seasons with the sitcom Less than Perfect and a recurring role on the NBC drama Heroes.

His sisters Julia Roberts and Lisa Roberts Gillan, and daughter Emma Roberts, also have acting careers.

As of March 6, 2026, Roberts is credited with appearances in 809 different released productions, making him one of the most prolific screen actors of all time.

== Film ==
Year	Title	Role	Notes
1978	King of the Gypsies	Dave Stepanović	Nominated – Golden Globe Award for Best Motion Picture Acting Debut – Male
1981	Raggedy Man	Teddy	
1983	Star 80	Paul Snider	Boston Society of Film Critics Award for Best Actor; Nominated – Golden Globe Award for Best Actor in a Motion Picture – Drama; Nominated – New York Film Critics Circle Award for Best Actor
1984	The Pope of Greenwich Village	Paulie	
1985	The Coca-Cola Kid	Becker	
1985	Runaway Train	Buck McGeehy	Nominated – Academy Award for Best Supporting Actor; Nominated – Golden Globe Award for Best Supporting Actor – Motion Picture
1986	Nobody's Fool	Riley Hood	
1989	Rude Awakening	Fred Wook	
1989	Blood Red	Marco Collogero	
1989	Best of the Best	Alex Grady	
1990	The Ambulance	Josh Baker	
1991	Lonely Hearts	Frank	
1991	By the Sword	Alexander Villard	
1992	Final Analysis	Jimmy Evans	
1993	Best of the Best II	Alex Grady	
1994	Babyfever	Anthony	
1994	Freefall	Grant Orion	
1994	The Hard Truth	Chandler Etheridge	
1994	Sensation	Ian Burton	
1994	The Specialist	Tomas Leon	
1994	Love Is a Gun	Jack Hart	
1995	The Immortals	Jack	
1995	The Nature of the Beast	Adrian "Dusty"	
1996	It's My Party	Nick Stark	
1996	Public Enemies	Arthur Dunlop	
1996	Power 98	Karlin Pickett	
1996	Heaven's Prisoners	Bubba Rocque	
1996	The Cable Guy	Himself	
1996	Glass Cage	Montrachet	
1996	American Strays	Martin	
1996	Past Perfect	Dylan Cooper	
1997	The Shadow Men	Bob Wilson	
1997	Most Wanted	John Spencer	
1997	T.N.T.	Russo	
1998	The Prophecy II	Michael	
1998	La Cucaracha	Walter Pool	
1998	Making Sandwiches	Julia	Short film
1998	Dead End	Henry Smovinsky	
1999	Restraining Order	Robert Woodfield	
1999	Wildflowers	Jacob	
1999	Façade	Colin Wentworth	
1999	Hitman's Run	Tony Lazorka / John Dugan	
2000	Luck of the Draw	Carlo	
2000	Tripfall	Mr. Eddie	
2000	No Alibi	Victor Haddock / Stanley Joiner	
2000	The Alternate	The Alternate	
2000	Cecil B. Demented	Honey's Ex-Husband	
2000	The King's Guard	Augustus Talbert	
2000	Sanctimony	Lieutenant	
2000	Mercy Streets	Rome	
2000	The Flying Dutchman	Sean	
2001	Fast Sofa	Mr. Robinson	
2001	The Beatnicks	Mack Drake	
2001	Raptor	Jim Tanner	
2001	Con Games	Hopkins	
2002	Wrong Number	Josh Grey	
2002	Spun	The Man	
2002	Wolves of Wall Street	Dyson Keller	
2003	Intoxicating	Teddy	
2003	National Security	Nash	
2003	Endangered Species	Mike "Sully" Sullivan	
2003	The Long Ride Home	Hank Bowman	
2004	Six: The Mark Unleashed	Dallas	
2004	The Last Shot	Himself	Uncredited
2004	Killer Weekend	Jack Talbot	
2004	Border Blues	Larry "Coyote Larry"	
2005	Final Approach	Coach Davis	
2005	Break a Leg	Michael Richard Lange	
2005	Confessions of an Action Star	Himself / Police Chief	
2005	Spit	Jack	Short film
2005	Graves End	Tarkington Alexander Graves	
2005	The Civilization of Maxwell Bright	Arliss	
2005	Chains	Jack	
2005	Geppetto's Secret	Jack Hammer	Voice
2006	A Guide to Recognizing Your Saints	Older Antonio	
2006	Phat Girlz	Robert Myer	
2006	Hollywood Dreams	Thomas Kurt	
2006	DOA: Dead or Alive	Dr. Victor Donovan	
2006	One Way	Nick Swell	
2006	Aurora	Mr. Brown	
2007	Killer Weekend	Mason	
2007	Sister's Keeper	Malikai	
2007	Blizhniy Boy: The Ultimate Fighter	Ivan	
2008	Witless Protection	Wilford Duvall	
2008	Contamination	Dmitri	
2008	The Dark Knight	Sal Maroni	
2008	Dark Honeymoon	L.A. Guy	
2008	Light Years Away	Dr. Howard Melvin	
2009	The Steam Experiment	Grant	
2009	Rock Slyde	Jake, The Deliveryman	
2009	Shannon's Rainbow	Mitchell Prescott	
2009	Royal Kill	Dad	
2009	The Whole Truth	Yaro Maroslav	
2009	Crimes of the Past	Robert Byrne	
2009	The Butcher	Merle "The Butcher" Hench	
2009	Project Solitude	John Sola	
2009	The Tomb	Vaslov	
2009	Pinkville	Johnny "Pies"	
2009	In the Blink of an Eye	Captain Jones	
2010	Westbrick Murders	John Barrow	
2010	Enemies Among Us	Cobbs	
2010	Groupie	Angus	
2010	The Expendables	James Munroe	
2010	Reality Star	Frank	
2010	Hunt to Kill	U.S. Border Patrol Agent Lee Davis	
2010	Sharktopus	Dr. Nathan Sands	
2010	First Dog	The President	
2010	Bed & Breakfast	Mr. Hopewell	
2010	Kingshighway	Frank Monviano	
2011	Black Gold		
2011	Chillerama	General Bukakke	Segment: "Wadzilla"
2011	The Wayshower	Parley Hinkins	
2011	Jesse	Chris	
2012	Silver Case	Senator	
2012	Deadline	Ronnie Bullock	
2012	The Dead Want Women	Sonny Barnes	
2012	Snow White: A Deadly Summer	Grant	
2012	Bloodwork	Man In Suit	
2012	The Night Never Sleeps	Hector	
2012	Stealing Las Vegas	Alex Stratholme	
2012	Beyond the Trophy	Sergeant Bachman	
2012	The Mark	Cooper	
2012	Worth: The Testimony of Johnny St. James	Hickey	
2012	Christmas in Compton	Tommy Maxwell	
2012	Mary	Dr. Marley	Short film
2012	This Shining Night	Marc	
2012	Mission: The Prophet	John Payne	
2012	iVOTE	McCallum	Short film
2013	Wrong Cops	Bob	
2013	Lovelace	Nat Laurendi	
2013	Hansel & Gretel: Warriors of Witchcraft	Mr. Sebastian	
2013	Assumed Killer	Taxi Driver	
2013	Betrayal	Tony	
2013	A Talking Cat!?!	Duffy the Cat	Voice
2013	Revelation Road: The Beginning of the End	Sheriff Jensen	
2013	The Mark: Redemption	Cooper	
2013	This Is Our Time	Bob	
2013	Sink Hole	Cutter	
2013	Paranormal Movie	Dr. Lipschitz	
2013	Pop Star	Mr. Esposito	
2013	The House Across the Street	Officer Peterson	
2013	The Perfect Summer	Lou	
2013	A New York Heartbeat	Mike "Casket Mike"	
2013	White T	Ricardo	
2013	Revelation Road: The Sea of Glass and Fire	Sheriff Jensen	
2013	The Cloth	Father Tollman	
2013	Self Storage	Walter	
2013	The Hot Flashes	Lawrence Humphrey	
2013	West End	Victor Trevi	
2013	Assault on Wall Street	Louis Patterson	
2013	Abstraction	Angelo Morretti	
2013	Run	Jeremiah	
2013	So This Is Christmas	Bill	
2013	In the Name of God	Wallace	
2013	Before I Sleep	David	
2013	Bonnie & Clyde: Justified	Ranger Frank Hamer	
2013	All American Christmas Carol	Ghost of Christmas Past	
2013	Dante's Hell Animated	Dante	Voice; Short film; English version
2013	Day of the Gun	Abraham Tanner	
2013	Spanners	Jonathan	
2013	Jet Set	Dr. Brix	
2013	Cool Cat Finds a Gun	Himself	
2014	Good Mourning, Lucille	Ristori	
2014	Chicks Dig Gay Guys	Mr. Wagner	
2014	SEAL Patrol	Mr. Cromwell	
2014	Eternity: The Movie	Gene Weiner	
2014	Road to the Open	Tim Gollant	
2014	A Cry from Within	Jonathan	
2014	Camp Dread	Julian Barrett	
2014	Rumors of Wars	Zurn	
2014	Doc Holliday's Revenge	William	
2014	Scavenger Killers	Agent Guthro	
2014	Bigfoot vs. D.B. Cooper	Older Bernie	Voice
2014	Sector 4: Extraction	Black Knight CEO	
2014	Scenes from Powned	Gary Weist	Short film
2014	Powdered Donuts	Steve	Short film
2014	It's Not a Date	Dad	
2014	Starcrossed	Rommel Lazarus	
2014	2 Bedroom 1 Bath	Dr. Philip Tenenbaum	
2014	Let the Lion Roar	Augustine of Hippo	
2014	Inherent Vice	Michael Z. "Mickey" Wolfmann	Independent Spirit Robert Altman Award (shared with rest of cast)
2014	The Opposite Sex	Mr. Campbell	
2014	Revelations	Dr. Greene	
2014	Rogue Strike	Captain Novakov	
2014	Halloween Hell	Count Dracula	
2015	Cowboys v. Dinosaurs	Trent Walker	
2015	Story of Eva	Detective Wood	
2015	The Wrath	The Mayor	
2015	Amityville Death House	The Warlock	
2015	Dead Ringer	Peter Bengston	
2015	Las Vegas Story	Walter	
2015	Skin Traffik	The Executive	
2015	No Deposit	Gerry Gaci	
2015	American Sharia	Officer Richardson	
2015	A Fatal Obsession	Michael Ryan	
2015	Fractured	Dr. Jason Ballard	
2015	Ktown Cowboys	Al	
2015	Silver Case	Senator	
2015	The Epic of Hershey	Ted	Short film
2015	The Way It Melts	Dr. Thornwood	Short film
2015	Charlie, Trevor and a Girl Savannah	Dr. McMillan	
2015	L.A. Slasher	The Mayor	
2015	Rock Story	Andy Granite	
2015	Maul Dogs	Jack	
2015	Sicilian Vampire	Detective Louis Marshall	
2015	Dead Saturday	Malcolm	Short film
2015	Golden Shoes	Frank	
2015	The Human Centipede 3 (Final Sequence)	Governor Hughes	
2015	Love Me True	Father Anthony	
2015	The Wicked Within	Dr. Woods	
2015	Relentless Justice	Lanzetta	
2015	The Condemned 2	Frank Tanner	
2015	There Is Many Like Us	L.T. Rauder	
2015	Redux	Tailored Man	Short film
2015	Lazarus Rising	James Connolly	
2016	The Code of Cain	Dave Parker	
2016	Bunker: Project 12	Henderson	
2016	Than All Else Ever	Captain George Sigler	Short film
2016	Five Grand	U.S. Marshal Denton J. Cartwright	
2016	Prayer Never Fails	Judge Bolden	
2016	Compadres	Dalton	
2016	The Rally-LA	Santiago	
2016	A Remarkable Life	Jack	
2016	Evil Exhumed	The Shaman	Voice
2016	1959	Jim Blackwell	
2016	Hunting Season	William	
2016	Joker's Wild	James Jenning	
2016	The Sector	Senator Allen	
2016	Six Gun Savior	The Devil	
2016	Leaves of the Tree	Patrick	
2016	Oiled Up	Loan Shark	Short film
2016	The Red Maple Leaf	Secret Service Agent Holmes	
2016	Surge of Power: Revenge of the Sequel	Augur	
2016	Snare	Vito	
2016	Moments of Clarity	Hal Spreadum	
2016	Enemy Within	Jack	
2016	Gender Bender	Kent Skillman	
2016	Sorority Slaughterhouse	Dean Whitman	
2016	Best Thanksgiving Ever	Rod	
2016	Santa's Boot Camp	Mall Santa	
2016	Uploaded	Bobby	
2016	A Trip to Jamaica	Sonnie	
2016	Through a Class Darkly	Professor Turner	
2016	Star Trek: Captain Pike	Dr. Lee Parsons	
2016	Paradise Club	Earl Wild	
2016	JOB's Daughter	Detective McQueen	
2016	EuroClub	Uncle Nicky	
2017	The Matadors	CIA Director	
2017	The Summoning	Chief Lubbock	
2017	Eyes of the Roshi	Booker	
2017	30 Days to Say Goodbye	Jim Walsh	Short film
2017	Victory by Submission	Leon "The Neon" Harris	
2017	Deadly Sanctuary	Tugg	
2017	Almost Amazing	Zane	
2017	The Institute	Dr. Torrington	
2017	Actors Anonymous	Sonny	
2017	But Deliver Us from Evil	Leigh Warring	
2017	You're Gonna Miss Me	Lawrence Graves	
2017	Unbridled	Roger Donigal	
2017	Lux in Tenebris	Dean Deus	
2017	Executor	Richard	
2017	Beyond Brotherhood	Buelo Chino	
2017	The Terror of Hallow's Eve	Ed	
2017	Ayla: The Daughter of War	Major General Coulter	
2017	Jake's Road	Keith	
2017	Osprey	Apollos	
2017	Henri	Jenkins Chesney	
2017	Spreading Darkness	Stu Undercoffler	
2017	The Demonic Dead	The Devil	
2017	Mirror Image	Captain Fanning	
2017	Fake News	Maxwell Stern	
2017	Maximum Impact	Robert Jacobs	
2017	The Beautiful Ones	Carl	
2017	Intent	Detective Gordon	
2017	Get Naked!	The Governor	
2017	Amores De Peso	Mr. Peters	
2018	Deported	Lancing	
2018	Days of Power	Nick	
2018	Something	Coroner	
2018	Neron	Priest	
2018	Hide in the Light	Father Wes	
2018	Beverly Hills Bandits	Jack Boudin	
2018	Papa	Dr. Eric Owens	
2018	Never Saw It Coming	Wendell Garfield	
2018	The Immortal Wars	Dominion Harvey	
2018	A.I. Tales	Tailored Man	
2018	Blackbird	Blake	
2018	Black Wake	Dr. Frank	
2018	Beautifully Broken	Larry Hartley	
2018	Lore	Sheriff	
2018	Frank & Ava	Harry Cohn	
2018	Rusty Tulloch	Mr. G.	
2018	Head Full of Honey	Dr. Holst	
2018	The Perception	Nick Shaw	
2018	Q-4: Dream Corporation	Farraday	
2019	Lone Star Deception	Bill Sagle	
2019	The Unlikely Good Samaritan	Jimmy	
2019	IRL	Jonathan	
2019	Induced Effect	Boss	
2019	Billboard	Rick	
2019	It Wants Blood!	Senator Du Sang	
2019	Hollywould	Leon Davenport / Edward Travis	
2019	Blackbear	Coach Bronx	
2019	The Savant	Lonnie	
2019	79 Parts: Director's Cut	Jack's Dad	
2019	A Karate Christmas Miracle	James Whitmore	
2019	The Evil Inside Her	Clayton	
2019	The Turnaround 2	Carter Boston	Short film
2019	90 Feet from Home	William Rota	
2019	The Immortal Wars: Resurgence	Dominion Harvey	
2019	Prescience	Mathew Smith	
2019	The Reliant	Mr. Jones	
2019	Surge of Dawn	Augur	
2019	Night Walk	Judge Jude	
2019	7 Deadly Sins	Judge	
2019	Inside the Rain	Monty Pennington	
2019	The Choice	Michael, The GameMaster	
2020	Angels Fallen	Werrick	
2020	The Estate	Marcello	
2020	People in Landscape	Veles	
2020	Hard Luck Love Song	Skip	
2020	Top Gunner	Herring	
2021	Ape vs. Monster	Ethan Marcos	
2021	Pups Alone	CEO Bill	
2021	616 Wilford Lane	David	
2021	The Shuroo Process	Himself	
2021	Deadly Nightshade	Father Walsh	
2021	The Rebels of PT-218	William Snow	
2021	After Masks	Russell	Segment: "Quarantales"
2021	The Poltergeist Diaries	John McBride	
2021	Heavy Duty Lovers	Mr. Roberts	
2021	Alter Ego	Detective DiBiasse	
2021	The Sleepless	Dr. Moore	
2021	Peach Cobbler	Stanley	
2021	Unchained	The Father	
2021	Sarogeto	Ross Langely	
2021	Andronicus	The Father	
2021	Uploaded	Bobby	
2021	Soul Pursuit	Dad	
2021	Marked	Alexei	
2021	A Town Called Parable	Pastor John Corell	
2021	Night Night	Dr. Nelson	
2021	The Elevator	Roman Juniper	
2021	The Tasmanian Devil	Javier Torres	
2021	The Magic	Bill Buchanan	
2021	Mr. Birthday	Rick	
2021	Memoirs of a Fighter	Peter Williams	
2021	A Kiss for the Devil	Stick	
2021	Deadly Nightshade	Father Walsh	
2021	Sour Honey	Cillian	
2021	Greater Peace of Mind	Mark	
2021	Our Kind	Mr. McGill	
2021	Purse	William	
2021	Megaboa	Dr. Malone	
2022	The Surprise Visit	Hugh	
2022	The Electric Man	Mr. Manson	
2022	8 Days to Hell	Alex Fillmore	
2022	Broadcast	Sherman Paragon	
2022	The Rideshare Killer	Lieutenant Moyer	
2022	Escape Through Africa	Caption Lockwood	
2022	Hide and Seek	Travis	
2022	From Dusk Till Bong	Harvey Van Winkle	
2022	Sally Floss: Digital Detective	The Host	
2022	The Other Path	Alexander Knight	
2022	69 Parts	Dad	
2022	The Elevator Game	Clayton Riggs	
2022	City Rush 3	Chief Montana	
2022	Insite	Derek	
2022	Babylon	Robert Roy	
2022	Soul Cage	Russ Hammer	
2023	Sweetwater	Judd	
2023	Death on the Border	Detective John Boone	
2023	Altered Perceptions	John Cooper	
2023	Assault on Hill 400	Ed Anderson (Combat Photographer)	
2023	Suffrage	Walt Warner	
2023	Hippo	Narrator	
2024	Terror of the Soul	Father Francis	
2024	Scars		
2024	Trust in Love		
2024	Amityville Bigfoot	Domonic	
2024	Aftermath	The Mysterious Man	
2024	Mundije	Frank Gialione	
2024	The Epidemic	Ralph	
2024	Brother 3	Policeman	
2024	Sour Honey	Cillian	Short film
2024	The Fusion	Kai	Short film
2024	Kruz'	Krusemark	Short film
2024	The Private Eye	Edmond	
2024	Seance Games: Metaxu	Demon	
2024	And Now I Lay Me Down	Celia Dalvi's Husband	
2024	The Laundress	Husband	
2024	Once Upon a Time in Hollyweird		
2024	The Company We Keep	Pete Matthews	
2024	Snow White and the Seven Samurai	Joseph Voight	
2024	Intent Unknown	Drew Campbell	
2024	Garlic Parmesan	Wing Guru	
2024	Team of Two	Captain Johnson	
2024	Woke	Stephen Logan	
2024	Sallywood	Clem the Agent	
2024	Psycho Ex	Trevor	
2024	Mr. Pettigrew	Arliss Blackthorne	
2024	Protocol-7	Errani	
2024	Fyre Rises	Commander Cowley	
2024	Ojai	The Rigid Man	
2024	Insane Like Me?	Sheriff Davis	
2024	Space Sharks	Dr. Johnson	
2024	Arena Wars	Admiral Jordan	
2024	Mr. Blue Shirt: The Inspiration	Famine	
2024	Rice Girl: My Redneck Neighbor II	Leroy Reddick	
2024	Lumina	Thom	
2024	The Firing Squad	Adam Markman	
2024	Dead Community Guild	The Stranger	
2024	The Depths	Professor Conrad	
2024	Haunted Happy Hour	Kolsch	
2024	Spawns	John Keaton	
2024	An Angry Boy	Andy	
2024	Death Pays Flora a Visit	Death	Short film
2024	My Hero		Indian film
2024	Down Below	Dr Rockeby	
2024	Santa's Cousin	Santa Claus	
2024	The Contract	Giuseppe	
2024	Holiday in the Hamptons	Arnold Lewis	
2025	Things Like This	Paul Mandel	
2026	Holiguards Saga — The Portal of Force	Ensis	
2026	Attack of the Killer Tomatoes: Organic Intelligence	Reporter	
2026	Not My Dog	Chuck	
2026	Quarter	Dr. Miller	Post-production
TBA	Towpath	US Attorney David Acheson	Post-production

== Television ==
Year	Title	Role	Notes
1974	How to Survive a Marriage	Stephen	3 episodes
1977	Another World	Ted Bancroft	Recurring role
1980	Paul's Case	Paul	Television film
1983	Miss Lonelyhearts	Miss Lonelyhearts	Television film
1986	Slow Burn	Jacob Asch	Television film
1990	Descending Angel	Michael Rossi	Television film
1990	Vendetta: Secrets of a Mafia Bride	Sean McLeary	3 episodes
1993	Love, Honor & Obey: The Last Mafia Marriage	Bill Bonanno	Television miniseries
1993	Voyage	Gil Freeland	Television film
1993	Love, Cheat & Steal	Reno Adams	Television film
1994	Primer plano	Himself	Television film
1994	Femmes Fatales: Sharon Stone	Himself	Television film
1995	Saved by the Light	Dannion Brinkley	Television film
1996	The Drew Carey Show	Steven	Episode: "Drew's the Other Man"
1996	In Cold Blood	Perry Smith	2 episodes Nominated – Satellite Award for Best Actor – Miniseries or Television Film
1996	Doctor Who	The Master / Bruce	Television film
1996	Dark Angel	Walter D'Arcangelo	Television film
1997	Frasier	Chet	Voice, episode: "Roz's Krantz & Gouldenstein Are Dead"
1997	The Odyssey	Eurymachus	2 episodes
1997	Oz	Richard L'Italien	Episode: "Capital P"
1999	Purgatory	Jack "Blackjack" Britton	Television film
1999	Lansky	Benny "Bugsy" Siegel	Television film
1999	Touched by an Angel	Nick Stratton	Episode: "Made in the U.S.A"
1999	Todd McFarlane's Spawn	Petey	Voice, episode: "The Mindkiller"
1999	Heaven's Fire	Dean McConnell	Television film
1999	The Hunger	Jean	Episode: "The Dream Sentinel"
2000	Falcone	Raymond "The Madman" Ricci	4 episodes
2000	Race Against Time	James Gabriel	Television film
2001	The King of Queens	Strohmeyer	Episode: "Paint Misbehavin"
2001	Law & Order: Special Victims Unit	Sam Winfield	Episode: "Victims"
2001	The Andy Dick Show	Prisoner	Episode: "Pee-Bop"
2001	Walking Shadow	Police Chief DeSpain	Television film
2001	Mindstorm	David Mendez	Television film
2002	Justice League	Mongul	Voice, episode: "War World"
2002	Roughing It	The Foreman	Television film
2002	Witchblade	Lupo	Episode: "Parabolic"
2002–2005	Less than Perfect	Will Butler	61 episodes Satellite Award for Best Supporting Actor – Television Series
2003	L.A. Confidential	Pierce Patchett	Pilot
2004	Miss Cast Away and the Island Girls	Maximus Powers	Television film
2004	Justice League Unlimited	Mongul	Voice, episode: "For the Man Who Has Everything"
2005	Danny Phantom	Dark Danny	Voice, episode: "The Ultimate Enemy!"
2005	CSI: Miami	Ken Kramer	Episode: "Whacked"
2006–2007	The L Word	Gabriel McCutcheon	3 episodes
2006	Fatal Desire	Joe	Television film
2007	Pandemic	Mayor D'Alesandro	Television film
2007–2010	Heroes	Agent Thompson	7 episodes
2008	Fear Itself	Harry Siegal / Harry Bender	Episode: "Spooked"
2008	Law & Order: Criminal Intent	Roy Hubert	Episode: "Betrayed"
2008	The Cleaner	Ray Crin	Episode: "Here Comes the Boom"
2008	Entourage	Himself	Episode: "Tree Trippers"
2008	Cyclops	Emperor Tiberius	Television film
2008	Depth Charge	Commander William Krieg	Television film
2009	Crash	Seth Blanchard	13 episodes
2010	Sharktopus	Dr. Nathan Sands	Television film
2010	Chuck	Packard	Episode: "Chuck Versus the Couch Lock"
2010–2011	The Young and the Restless	Vance Abrams	34 episodes
2011	Criminal Minds: Suspect Behavior	Andy Armus	Episode: "The Time Is Now"
2011	Burn Notice	Reed Perkins	Episode: "Fail Safe"
2011	Vegan 101	Dr. Eaton Wright	3 episodes
2012	The Finder	Uncle Shadrack	2 episodes
2012	Femme Fatales	David Bannion	Episode: "Family Business"
2012	Bullet in the Face	Racken	6 episodes
2012	L'onore e il rispetto 3	Tom Di Maggio	5 episodes
2012	Das Kind	Robert Stern	Television film
2012	A Halloween Puppy	Ted	Television film
2013–2015	CSI: Crime Scene Investigation	Brother Daniel Larson	3 episodes
2013	High Heels, Low Standards	Senator Starling	Episode: "My Two Daddies"
2013	Tainted Love	Fred Lucas	4 episodes
2013	Deadtime Stories	Merlin "Crazy Merlin"	Episode: "Little Magic Shop of Horrors"
2014–2019	Suits	Charles Forstman	9 episodes
2014	Glee	Fundraiser Coordinator	Episode: "The Back-Up Plan"
2014	Justified	Agent Miller	Episode: "Wrong Roads"
2015	Hawaii Five-0	Richard Sheridan	Episode: "Wawahi moe'uhane"
2015	The Player	Pauly Agostino	Episode: "The Big Blind"
2015	Stalked by My Doctor	Dr. Albert Beck	Television film
2015	Lost Girl	Hades / Jack	9 episodes
2016	The Wrong Roommate	Floyd Mezner	Television film
2016	Scorpion	Mick Doherty	Episode: "The Fast and the Nerdiest"
2016	Mann & Wife	Officer Wilson	Episode: "Mann Up"
2016	Non è stato mio figlio	Giovanni Geraldi	8 episodes
2016	Brooklyn Nine-Nine	Jimmy Figgis	Episode: "Coral Palms: Part 3"
2016	Stalked by My Doctor: The Return	Dr. Albert Beck	Television film
2016	A Husband for Christmas	Mr. Rawlings	Television film
2016	Swedish Dicks	Chip	Episode: "#1.8"
2016	Code Black	Vince Savetti	2 episodes
2016–2020	Medinah	Randall	4 episodes
2017	Changelings	Father Martin Mordicai	Episode: "Aswang"
2017	My Cat from Hell	Himself	Episode: "Jekyll and Hyde Cat"
2017, 2021	Grey's Anatomy	Robert Avery	2 episodes
2018	New Dogs, Old Tricks	Alexander Fortnoy	2 episodes
2018	The Wrong Teacher	Clark	Television film
2018	Stalked by My Doctor: Patient's Revenge	Dr. Albert Beck	Television film
2019	Stalked by My Doctor: A Sleepwalker's Nightmare	Dr. Albert Beck	Television film
2019	Those Who Can't	Dave "Dealin' Dave"	2 episodes
2019	The Wrong Mommy	Roger	Television film
2019	Monster Island	General Horne	Television film
2019	La Reina del Sur		
2020	Kidding	Bernard Paley	Episode: "I Wonder What Grass Tastes Like"
2020	Interrogation	Bernard Poulos	2 episodes
2020	Date of Honor	Flex	4 episodes
2021	The Wrong Mr. Right	Hal	Television film
2021	Just What the Doctor Ordered	Dr. Albert Beck	Television film
2022	The Righteous Gemstones	Junior Marsh	7 episodes
2022	The Rookie: Feds	Josh Reynolds	Episode: "To Die For"
2022	Family Reunion	Silas Lawrence	Episode: "Remember Our 20 Acres and a Deed?"
2023	Јужни ветар: На граници	John Bradley	10 episodes
2024	The Wrong Life Coach	Mr. Gordon	Television film
2024	Hit-Monkey	Albert Rinkov	
2024	Dancing with the Stars	Himself	Season 33 contestant; 10th place

== Music videos ==
Year	Title	Role	Artist
2002	"Down Azz Chick"	White Cop	Ja Rule
2004	"Mr. Brightside"	Apple Eating Pimp	The Killers
2005	"It's Like That"	Fiancé	Mariah Carey
2005	"We Belong Together"	Groom	Mariah Carey
2006	"Smack That"	Cop	Akon ft. Eminem
2006	"Hey You"	Crime Boss	Godhead
2012	"Miss Atomic Bomb"	Rival Lover	The Killers
2012	"Don't Say Goodbye (Nagoo Bedroud)"	Angel	Googoosh
2014	"Черная вуаль"	Mob Boss / Lover	Angelica Agurbash
2015	"Bitch Better Have My Money"	Cop	Rihanna
2015	"Nearly Forgot My Broken Heart"	Prisoner	Chris Cornell
2018	"El Baño"	Time Lord / The Bartender	Enrique Iglesias ft. Bad Bunny
2026	"Berserker"	Teacher	Sabaton

== Audio dramas ==
Year	Title		Role	Notes
2019	The Diary of River Song: Series 5		The Master	Episode: The Lifeboat and the Deathboat
2019	Doctor Who: Ravenous		The Master	Episodes: Day of the Master Part One, Day of the Master Part Two
2021	Masterful		The Master	Special release marking 50 years of the character of the Master
2021	Master!	Series 1	The Master	N/A
2022	Master!	Series 2: Nemesis Express	The Master	N/A
2024	Master!	Series 3: Planet Doom	The Master	N/A
2025	Dark Gallifrey	Master!	The Master	N/A
2026	Doctor Who: Short Trips Volume 14: Impeccable and Other Stories		The Master	Episode: Impeccable
2026	Zygon Century: Transformation		The Master	Episode: 1968: An Incident in Death Valley

== Web series ==
Year	Title	Role	Episodes
2025	On Cinema	Himself	Special : "The 12th On Cinema Oscar Special at Movie House"
