= Drew Massey =

American voice actor

- Born: Nickel Mines, Pennsylvania, U.S.
- Occupations: Producer; writer; voice actor; puppeteer; director; cartoonist; illustrator; character designer
- Years active: 1989–present

Drew Massey is an American voice actor, puppeteer and director for Nickelodeon and the Jim Henson Company. He has worked extensively with the Muppets and has performed in many films, television series, and commercials. He has also lent his voice to many commercials and video games.

== Career ==
Drew Massey is the co-creator, co-writer, executive producer (with Mike Mitchell) and star of the Nickelodeon series The Barbarian and the Troll. Massey's film credits include The Happytime Murders (2018), Men in Black (1997), Dr. Dolittle (1998), Cats & Dogs (2001), Men in Black II (2002), The Muppets' Wizard of Oz (2005), and The Producers (2005). He has also performed on television in Earth to Ned, Greg the Bunny, Angel, Malcolm in the Middle, Muppets Tonight, Cousin Skeeter, Lost on Earth, and Crank Yankers; and in television advertisements for Foster Farms (as the driver chicken), Sony (the blue guy), and Levi's (as Flat Eric). In the Over the Hedge video game, Massey voiced Verne and other characters. In the Kung Fu Panda video games, he voiced Crane and other characters. In the Megamind video game, he voiced Minion and other characters. He is the star of The Sam Plenty Cavalcade of Action Show Plus Singing!, playing Sam Plenty. He is also a performer on No, You Shut Up! and Spontaneanation with Paul F. Tompkins.

Massey directed six episodes of Splash and Bubbles for the Jim Henson Company, and over 50 shorts for the DreamWorksTV/Peacock Kids YouTube channel featuring Po, Puss in Boots, Shrek and Donkey, and King Julien.

== Filmography ==
- The Barbarian and the Troll: Evan
- Earth to Ned: Cornelius’ eyes, Clods
- Sigmund and the Sea Monsters: Sigmund Ooze
- The Muppets Take the Bowl: Additional Muppet Performer, live show at the Hollywood Bowl, Sept. 8–10, 2017
- The Muppets Take the O2: Additional Muppet Performer, live show at the O2 Arena, Jul. 13–14, 2018
- Mutt & Stuff: Stuff, Davenport, Sid the tree
- Community: Puppet Abed
- Sid the Science Kid: The Movie: Sid, Stack
- Sid the Science Kid: Sid
- Neil's Puppet Dreams: Puppeteer
- Forgetting Sarah Marshall: Puppeteer Dracula
- The Darjeeling Limited: Puppeteer Tiger
- The Sam Plenty Cavalcade of Action Show Plus Singing!: Actor (Sam Plenty)
- Yo Gabba Gabba!: Puppeteer
- Crank Yankers: Puppeteer
- Robot Chicken: Voices (Fozzie Bear, Gonzo, Wembley Fraggle, Boober Fraggle, Emmet Otter, Various)
- Greg the Bunny: Puppeteer (Count Blah and others)
- Angel: Puppet Angel
- Weezer's music video for "Keep Fishin'": Puppeteer
- Sesame Street: Additional Muppets
- Statler and Waldorf: From the Balcony: Puppeteer (Statler)
- The Producers: Lead Puppeteer (pigeons)
- Men in Black: Worm Guy Sleeble
- Lost on Earth: Raleigh
- The Puzzle Place: Kyle O'Connor
- Puppet Up!: Puppeteer
- The Happytime Murders: Goofer, Vinny
- Foster Farms Chickens: Actor (Driver Chicken)
- Over the Hedge: Verne
- Ryan's Mystery Playdate: Puppeteer
- Muppet Babies Play Date - Gonzo (baby) (puppeteer only)
- The Muppet Show - Supporting Muppet Performer
