= Hippo (film) =

2023 film by Mark H. Rapaport

- Theatrical release poster
- Directed by: Mark H. Rapaport
- Written by: Mark H. Rapaport; Kimball Farley
- Produced by: Anthony Argento; Mark H. Rapaport
- Starring: Kimball Farley; Lilla Kizlinger; Eliza Roberts; Jesse Pimentel
- Cinematography: William Tracy Babcock
- Edited by: Nik Voytas
- Music by: Kenny Kusiak
- Production companies: Kinematics; Rough House Pictures
- Distributed by: Kinematics
- Release dates: July 26, 2023 (Fantasia); November 8, 2024 (United States)
- Running time: 100 minutes
- Country: United States
- Language: English

Hippo is a 2023 American black comedy-drama film co-written and directed by Mark H. Rapaport in his feature directorial debut. It premiered at the Fantasia International Film Festival on July 26, 2023, and received a limited theatrical release in the United States on November 8, 2024. David Gordon Green, Danny McBride, and Jody Hill serve as executive producers through their company, Rough House Pictures.

== Cast ==
- Kimball Farley as Hippo
- Lilla Kizlinger as Buttercup
- Eliza Roberts as Ethel
- Jesse Pimentel as Darwin
- Vann Barrett as Dr. Lombardi
- Eric Roberts as the narrator

== Production ==
According to Rapaport, the film was shot during the COVID-19 pandemic at his grandmother’s house in State College, Pennsylvania.

== Release ==
UTA acquired the sales rights to the film on July 24, 2023. The film premiered at the Fantasia International Film Festival on July 26, 2023. It received a limited theatrical release in the United States on November 8, 2024.

== Reception ==
On the review aggregator website Rotten Tomatoes, 90% of 21 critics' reviews are positive.

Christian Zilko of IndieWire designated the film as a 'Critic's Pick' with a B+ score and wrote, "Quite possibly the darkest comedy released in 2024, it also deserves to be in the conversation for the year's funniest film. Blending Middle American weirdness with sexual excess in a way that evokes a version of Napoleon Dynamite directed by Peter Greenaway, the hangout movie is so dryly funny and precise in its construction that it’s easy to forget what a grotesque situation you’re laughing at.

Sydney Ghan of MovieWeb called the film "an avant-garde sex comedy that unleashes the quirks of Wes Anderson and Jim Jarmusch to their weirdest extents" and wrote, "Hippo doesn't hold back in exploring taboo subjects like incest, making viewers feel uncomfortable yet offering riotous laughter moments through the characters' absurdity."

Nick Allen of RogerEbert.com wrote, "What would have been really impressive is if [Mark H.] Rapaport could have made an emotional impact with the story, if the bold aesthetic and storytelling elements that prime us to feel such dark beauty led us to, in some way, care deeply for Hippo and Buttercup. Instead, the movie is limited more to immense promise, the work of a budding provocateur and American satirist with an addictive sense of bizarre character building and atmosphere first and foremost. Just as Hippo is sickly fascinated with our world, so are we with his."

Natalia Winkelman of The New York Times wrote, "Hippo is meant to be a comedy — a dark, muted one with a couple of rowdy set pieces. And although Roberts, channeling frivolity, does score some funny lines, the movie most often reads as a hollow exercise in mannered filmmaking, orbiting an array of characters whose carefully curated quirks are flimsy enough to blow away with the wind."

Wendy Ide of Screen Daily wrote, "There's something of Dogtooth's self-contained perversion of reality in this film but, while that film at least came with a kind of twisted internal logic, Hippo leans heavily on the fact that most of the characters have a fairly tenuous grip on sanity. Ultimately, a film that focuses on the delusional acts of delusional people gives us very little in the way of satisfying storytelling, instead veering rather too close to freak-show territory."
