= Love Is a Gun =

Love Is a Gun may refer to:

- Love Is a Gun (1994 film), a straight-to-video erotic thriller film
- Love Is a Gun (2023 film), a crime drama film
