= Lila Garrett =

American TV writer (1925–2020)

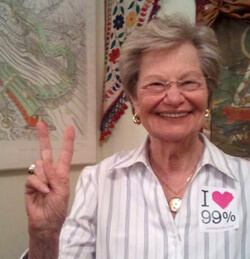
- Garrett in 2019
- Born: November 21, 1925; New York City, U.S.
- Died: February 1, 2020 (aged 94); Los Angeles, California, U.S.
- Occupation: Screenwriter
- Television: The ABC Afternoon Playbreak, The Other Woman, All in the Family, The Second Hundred Years, Bewitched, My Favorite Martian, Barney Miller
- Spouse: David Rayfiel (m. 1950; div. 1953)
- Children: Eliza Roberts
- Relatives: Keaton Simons (grandson); Eric Roberts (son-in-law)

Lila Garrett (November 21, 1925 – February 1, 2020) was an American television screenwriter and radio host who wrote for the sitcoms The Second Hundred Years (she co-wrote episodes 10 and 13 with Bernie Kahn), My Favorite Martian, All in the Family, and Bewitched. She also co-wrote The Barefoot Executive, a 1971 Disney TV movie, with Kahn and Stu Billett.

An anti-war activist, Garrett's political engagement includes starting Americans Against War with Iraq, serving as a DNC delegate for presidential candidate Michael Dukakis, presiding as president over the Southern California chapter of the Americans for Democratic Action, and being a founding member of Progressive Democrats of America. She hosted KPFK's Connect the Dots on Pacifica Radio, interviewing left-leaning luminaries and often closed her show with "The arms industry has neither allies nor enemies, only customers." She was a frequent contributor to the LA Progressive, an online magazine

She lived in the Motion Picture & Television Country House and Hospital for a while.

== Awards ==
- Shared Daytime Emmy Award for The ABC Afternoon Playbreak episode Mother of The Bride
- Shared Daytime Emmy Award for The ABC Afternoon Playbreak episode The Girl Who Couldn't Lose
- 1984, shared Writers Guild of America Award for The Other Woman
