= David Rayfiel =

American screenwriter (1923–2011)

- Born: September 9, 1923; New York City, U.S.
- Died: June 22, 2011 (aged 87); New York City
- Education: City University of New York, Brooklyn (BA); Yale University (MFA)
- Occupation: Screenwriter
- Spouses: Lila Garrett (m. 1950; div. 1953); Maureen Stapleton (m. 1963; div. 1966); Lynne Schwarzenbek (m. 1987)
- Children: Eliza Roberts
- Father: Leo F. Rayfiel
- Relatives: Keaton Simons (grandson); Eric Roberts (son-in-law)

David Rayfiel (September 9, 1923 – June 22, 2011) was an American screenwriter and a frequent collaborator of director Sydney Pollack.

== Life ==
Rayfiel was born in Brooklyn, New York. He was educated at Brooklyn College (class of 1947) and Yale School of Drama, where he received a master's degree in playwrighting. His father was congressman Leo F. Rayfiel.

In 1950 he married television screenwriter Lila Garrett. He and Garrett had a daughter, Eliza, and divorced in 1953. He married actress Maureen Stapleton in 1963; they were divorced in 1966. He married his third wife, Lynne Schwarzenbek, in 1987. In 1958 he had a house built in Day, New York west of Hudson Falls, New York, which has become known as the David Rayfiel House; it was listed on the National Register of Historic Places in 2009.

Rayfiel was very protective of his privacy; he avoided gatherings of more than four people. He was in isolation so often that he once filed his income taxes in person saying that he was "starved for human contact."

== Career ==
Rayfiel got his start in television in the mid-1950s, writing episodes for TV series including Assignment Foreign Legion and Norby. His association with Pollack began when Rayfiel's play P.S. 193 was staged in 1962. They soon teamed on episodes of Kraft Suspense Theater and Chrysler Theater. Rayfiel had uncredited rewrites ("script doctoring") on Pollack's feature films starting in 1965 with The Slender Thread; their collaboration continued over the next few decades. Even when Pollack did not enlist Rayfiel's talents as a writer, he still expected the self-proclaimed "utility man" to be in his corner. During the production of Tootsie, for example, Pollack consulted Rayfiel frequently by phone, despite the fact that Rayfiel had not been involved in any capacity during the writing phase.

Critics and connoisseurs have marveled at the consistency of Rayfiel's touch. He was called a "caster of mood spells" and "one of the greatest writers of adult romantic-emotional dialogue in film history." He openly admitted that he lacked the commercial instincts to originate screenplays of his own, but took pride in his contributions to the work of others. Nonetheless, he received sole credit on one feature screenplay, Lipstick, a 1976 rape-revenge thriller which was received with unbridled hostility from critics. Among those who swore by Rayfiel's abilities were actors Barbra Streisand, Jane Fonda, Robert Redford, and director Sidney Lumet, who trumpeted, "If you've got trouble with your picture, get David." Remarkably humble, Rayfiel pointed out that the most effective script doctoring actually happens on set, "Some of the best lines in any picture are written during lunch breaks, on the back of napkins or match covers.'' According to Redford, Rayfiel's dialogue tweaks provided "a ruefulness, a sadness and sometimes an anger, that I connect with."

Rayfiel's weekly re-write fee rose from $20,000 in the mid-1980s to $100,000 in the late 1990s.

== Death ==
Rayfiel died of heart failure, on June 22, 2011 in Manhattan, New York.

== Awards ==
In 1976, Rayfiel received an Edgar Allan Poe Award for Best Motion Picture Screenplay for Three Days of the Condor with Lorenzo Semple Jr. He received a César Award in 1981 for Death Watch.

== Screenplays ==
- The Slender Thread (uncredited) (1965)
- This Property is Condemned (1966)
- Castle Keep (1969)
- Valdez Is Coming (1971)
- Lipstick (1976)
- Three Days of the Condor (1975)
- Death Watch (La mort en direct) (1980)
- Absence of Malice (uncredited) (1981)
- Round Midnight (1986)
- The Morning After (uncredited) (1986)
- Havana (1990)
- The Firm (1993)
- Intersection (1994)
- Sabrina (1995)
- Random Hearts (uncredited) (1999)
- The Interpreter (uncredited) (2005)
