= Sarah Oh =

American actress and model (born 1990)

- Born: Sarah Henry; 1990 (age 35–36); Glendale, Arizona, U.S.
- Occupations: Actress, Model
- Years active: 2009–present

Sarah Oh (born 1990 in Glendale, Arizona) is an American actress and model. She is of Korean-German descent.

== Biography ==
She began acting when she was 13 at her school's theater department and starred in every single main stage production thereafter. Oh's first acting performance was in a one-act show based on the book Go Ask Alice where she played Alice. She later moved to Los Angeles at the age of 18 to further pursue her acting and modeling career.

== Career ==
Oh was cast in her first big feature in 2011 called Altergeist where she played a paranormal investigator. She later made more appearances in TV shows such as "The Bold and the Beautiful", "Rizzoli and Isles", "Knotts" and "House of Lies" along with features such as "Dirty Teacher", "Capture" (not yet released), "Altergeist". She aspires to make her way into the industry in Korea as well. On Splash and Bubbles she voices a number of recurring characters.

== Filmography ==
Year	Title	Role	Notes
2021	The Barbarian and the Troll	Stacey	
2016	Splash and Bubbles	Biggie; The Clusterwink; Denny	
2014	Altergeist	Maya	
2013	Dirty Teacher	Heather	
2013	Sesame Street	Various	
2012	House of Lies	Kanani	
2009	The Heart of Evil (short)	Kate	
2009	The Crypt	PJ	
2009	K-Town	Interviewee	
