= The Barbarian and the Troll =

American puppet comedy

- Genre: Puppet; Comedy
- Created by: Mike Mitchell; Drew Massey
- Voices of: Spencer Grammer; Drew Massey; Colleen Smith; Allan Trautman; Sarah Sarang Oh; Nicolette Santino; Peggy Etra; James Murray; Jeny Cassady; Gina Yashere
- Opening theme: "The Barbarian and the Troll" theme performed by Meta Dead of the Dead Deads
- Ending theme: "The Barbarian and the Troll" theme (instrumental)
- Composer: Matt Mahaffey
- Country of origin: United States
- Original language: English
- No. of seasons: 1
- No. of episodes: 13

Production
- Executive producers: Eileen Conn; Drew Massey; Mike Mitchell
- Producers: Jennifer Gore; David Magee
- Cinematography: Tyler Walzak
- Production companies: Mike Mitchell Productions; Brightlight Pictures; Nickelodeon Productions

Original release
- Network: Nickelodeon
- Release: April 2 – June 25, 2021

The Barbarian and the Troll is an American puppet comedy television series created by Mike Mitchell and Drew Massey that aired on Nickelodeon from April 2 to June 25, 2021.

== Premise ==
In the land of Gothmoria, Brendar is a fierce warrior princess on a quest to avenge an attack on her family. She finds adventure when she meets Evan, a spirited bridge troll in search of excitement and a place to perform his songs. They team up to save their kingdom and make both their dreams come true. Brendar and Evan are soon joined in their quest by Horus the wizard, his daughter Stacey who has been turned into an owl, and Horus' enchanted Axe.

== Cast ==
- Spencer Grammer as the voice of Brendar, a barbarian warrior on a quest to slay the demon that killed her mother and spirited away her younger brother.
- Drew Massey as Evan, a troll prince who joins Brendar's questing party to follow his dream and become a bard.

Other credited cast include Colleen Smith, Allan Trautman, Sarah Sarang Oh, Peggy Etra, James Murray, Nicolette Santino, Jeny Cassady, and Gina Yashere.

== Production ==
The series, then titled Brendar the Barbarian, was officially announced on September 23, 2020, with production set to begin in late 2020. It was filmed in Vancouver, British Columbia, Canada. Spencer Grammer was cast as the voice of Brendar with the puppeteers consisting of Drew Massey, Colleen Smith, Allan Trautman, Sarah Sarang Oh, Nicolette Santino, Peggy Etra, James Murray, and Jeny Cassidy. Phil LaMarr and Gina Yashere have been confirmed to provide voices with the former being cast as the voice of a knight named Steve.

== Episodes ==
No.	Title	Directed by	Written by	Original release date	Prod. code	U.S. viewers (millions)
1	"Brendar the Barbarian"	Mike Mitchell	Mike Mitchell & Drew Massey	April 2, 2021	101	0.61
While fighting a serpent, a barbarian named Brendar angers her boss Queen Shimmereen who strips her of her princess title and sword. A bridge troll prince from Gothmoria named Evan informs his father, the Troll King, that he doesn't want to be a troll booth attendant anymore. He later meets Brendar at a pub called "The Queen's Goiter" where she is working on rescuing her younger brother Kendar from the demon Alvin. Brendar is approached by General Skelly who persuades her to go on a quest which she suspects that the wizard Horus Scrum is behind where he gives her the owl Stacy. After fighting off General Skelly and his skeleton henchmen with Evan's help, Brendar intends to travel to Horus' castle while gaining Evan as a companion. General Skelly's head was last seen being pecked by a crow.
2	"Off to See the Wizard"	Mike Mitchell	Mike Mitchell & Drew Massey	April 9, 2021	102	0.35
When Brendar and Evan arrive Horus' castle, they learn that an evil witch named Gnarlia turned his daughter Stacy into an owl. Horus and Stacy join Brendar and Evan on their quest which involved Evan getting swallowed by a man-eating tree where he encounters the gnomes Tee Winkle and Wee Tinkle. Meanwhile, General Skelly's head is picked up by two bats.
3	"Blood, Sweat & Fears"	Mike Mitchell	Jenn Lloyd & Kevin Bonani	April 16, 2021	103	0.50
The group has to pass through the ominous Swamp of Fears where people are forced to confront their worst fears. Meanwhile, General Skelly uses the scarecrow body his head landed on to make it back to his castle where he has his minions put him back together.
4	"Season of the Witch"	Mike Mitchell	Story by : Mike Mitchell; Teleplay by : Jess Pineda & Mike Mitchell	April 23, 2021	104	0.31
Arriving at Gnarlia's castle, an admission from Stacey surprises Horus when she persuades the knight Steve (Phil LaMarr) to grant them passage. This is because Gnarlia is Horus' ex-wife and Stacy's mom and Gnarlia is currently in a relationship with Steve. Meanwhile, General Skelly runs into Tee Winkle and Wee Tinkle who persuade him to let their kind bring him to where Brendar is.
5	"My Sharon-Ah"	Mike Mitchell	Story by : Mike Mitchell; Teleplay by : Mike Mitchell & Eileen Conn	April 30, 2021	105	0.38
Brendar has doubt about completing her ultimate quest after a match against an old rival named Sharon who shows up at "The Queen's Goiter" and fends off General Skelly. While Evan meets Sharon's goblin companion Kevin, Brendar is unaware about the truth revolving around Axe.
6	"Parents Just Don't Understand"	Paul Fox	Story by : Mike Mitchell; Teleplay by : Mike Mitchell & Jenn Lloyd & Kevin Bonani	May 7, 2021	106	0.43
In light of some new information, Brendar has a falling out with Axe and briefly works as a barmaid at "The Queen's Goiter". In order to continue their quest, Evan must go back home to his parents to in order get a family heirloom so that they can get free access passed the other troll bridges. Meanwhile, Stacy falls in love with a mockingbird named Biff.
7	"When Dragons Cry"	Paul Fox	Jess Pineda	May 14, 2021	107	0.29
In order to obtain dragon tears to enchant Axe, the party must travel to a gnome marketplace to gather ingredients for the dragon's favorite stew. Along the way, Stacy learns the secrets of Brendar's past and quest while Brendar has an encounter with Steve who is doing some shopping for Gnarlia.
8	"Mapmaker, Mapmaker, Make Me a Map"	Craig Wallace	Jenn Lloyd & Kevin Bonani	May 21, 2021	108	0.38
Brendar's group establishes a dinner party at "The Queen's Goiter" in order to impress a known mapmaker called Christoph the Cartographer Unicorn who can make them a map that will lead them to Alvin's lair. They work to get Christoph impressed with the dinner party with varying results.
9	"Ice Ice Baby"	Craig Wallace	Eileen Conn	May 28, 2021	109	0.35
Angered at Brendar's continued defiance, Queen Shimmereen approves General Skelly's offer to defeat her in exchange for some resources. However, she also wants General Skelly to bring her Brendar's boots. Meanwhile, the party is lost in the snowy mountains with a blizzard incoming. Evan accidentally incites the wrath of the Florffs, a race of snow gnomes, when he unintentionally injures their Snow Ogre protector Fluffy. Now Brendar must act as Evan's lawyer at his trial and deal with General Skelly's next attack at the same time.
10	"Pictures of Boo"	Melanie Orr	Jess Pineda	June 4, 2021	110	0.30
A mysterious ghost colonel named Johnny Connosieur welcomes the group inside his house for sleep and shelter from a storm. When his friends start getting possessed by other ghosts with Johnny planning to trap them in portraits, Evan and a friendly mouse named Ivana must find a way to rescue them from the ghostly possession.
11	"I Will Survive"	Melanie Orr	Jenn Lloyd & Kevin Bonani	June 11, 2021	111	0.26
Arriving at the lair of Alvin, Brenda's party braves the challenges within Alvin's lair to find Kendar like getting by a demon cat that guards the entrance and avoiding every trap inside. Rescuing Kendar, the heroes return to the "Queen's Goiter" to celebrate their triumph. Kendar explains that the day Alvin attacked their homestead, he had discovered a strange crown while digging in the backyard. Brendar and the others make a vow to find Alvin and slay her. That night, Kendar goes to the privy only to be confronted by Alvin herself who presents the young barbarian with a deal... bring her Axe and she will leave him, Brendar, and their friends alone.
12	"The Queen Is Back"	Aleysa Young	Eileen Conn	June 18, 2021	112	0.36
Brendar learns of Axe's disappearance and what Kendar did to have Alvin leave Brendar alone. In order to rescue Axe, Brendar had to swallow her pride and lead her group into begging Queen Shimmereen for help. When Brendar does the things that Queen Shimmereen wants her to, Queen Shimmereen goes back on her word and imprisons Brendar's group in the dungeon which happens to be the same one that Axe is being held in. Before the dungeon master can have Axe melted down, the group is saved by Sharon. After escaping, the group is confronted by Queen Shimmereen who incapacitates Sharon. When Evan and Horus claim that Queen Shimmereen is working with Alvin, Queen Shimmereen does a musical number while transforming as everyone is shocked that Queen Shimmereen was Alvin all along.
13	"Come Together"	Aleysa Young	Mike Mitchell & Drew Massey	June 25, 2021	113	0.31
Having revealed herself, Alvin takes Brendar outside for their final battle, where Brendar and her friends emerge victorious. The ghost of Brendar's mother, Glendar, tells her that she is the new queen. However, Brendar soon gets bored and upset about her new role when the King of Nordronica, the Queen of Swamporia, and the Grand Duchess of the Upper Krelm criticize the plans for her changes as well as the fact that the Duke of the Lower Krelm could not make it. To make matters worse, she could not fight an evil warlock's invasion of Lower Krealm that Kendar told her about which explains the Duke's absence. After Brendar sneaks out, the other rulers are surprised when General Skelly emerges from the cake that Kyle made to take revenge on Brendar where they throw hot tea on him. She decided to step down and give the crown to Sharon with a note on its box advising her to rule kindly. Kevin even accepts Sharon's kind ruling of Gothmoria. Brendar then goes to Lower Krelm with Evan, Horus, Stacy, and Axe. However, it is hinted that Alvin may return as her severed tail is moving in the same direction of them.

== Reception ==
=== Ratings ===
Viewership and ratings per season of The Barbarian and the Troll
Season	Episodes	First aired		Last aired		Avg. viewers (millions)
Season	Episodes	Date	Viewers (millions)	Date	Viewers (millions)	Avg. viewers (millions)
1	13	April 2, 2021	0.61	June 25, 2021	0.31	0.37

=== Awards and nominations ===
Year	Award	Category	Nominee(s)	Result	Ref.
2022	Children's and Family Emmy Awards	Outstanding Art Direction/Set Decoration/Scenic Design	Matthew Budgeon, Gary Kordan, John Alvarez, Tricia Robertson, Kelsey Fowler, David Manske	Nominated	
