= Kristina Anapau =

American actress and writer

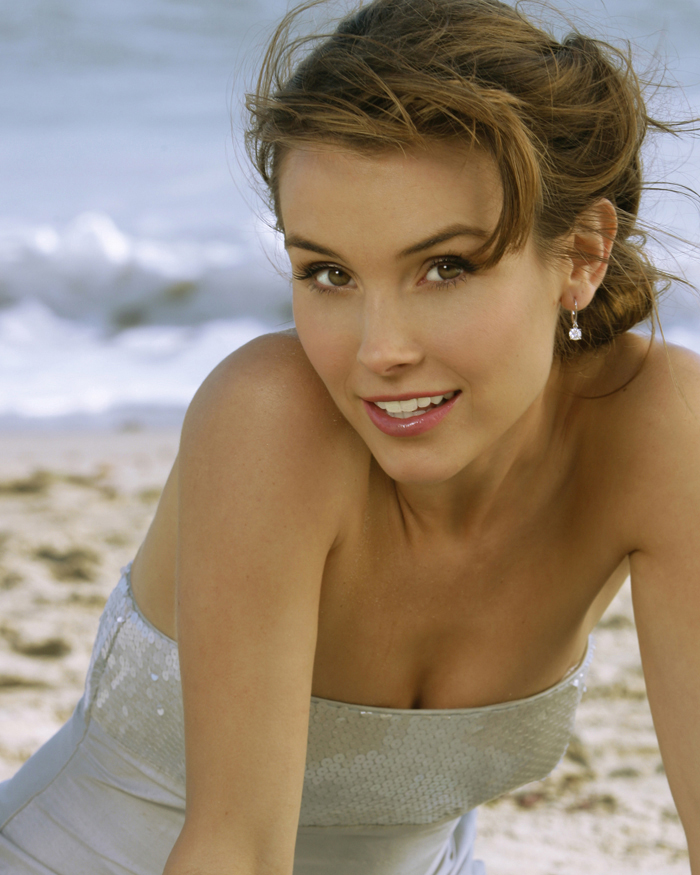
- Anapau in 2012
- Born: Kristina Elizabeth Anapau Roper; October 30, 1979 (age 46); Hawaii, U.S.
- Education: Skidmore College (B.S.)
- Occupations: Actress, writer
- Years active: 1997–present
- Spouse: Nathan Pierce

Kristina Elizabeth Anapau Roper (born October 30, 1979), better known as Kristina Anapau, is an American actress and writer. She is known for her roles as Maurella on the HBO series True Blood and as Galina in the 2010 film Black Swan. She also portrayed Cassidy Merteuil in Cruel Intentions 3.

== Early life ==
Kristina Elizabeth Anapau Roper was born in Hawaii. She graduated from high school at age 15 and began her studies at University of Hawaii at Manoa that same year. Before gaining success as an actress, Anapau had intended to become a classical ballerina, having trained seriously since the age of 4. She is a classically trained pianist and holds a Bachelor of Science degree from Skidmore College in New York.

== Career ==
=== Early career (1997–2009) ===
As a student of 16, while majoring in Art History and Dance, and with no plans of being an actress, Anapau was discovered by a talent agent and encouraged to audition for the 1997 film Escape from Atlantis (1997), which filmed in Anapau's native Hawaii. She landed the role of Katriana in the production and at the request of the film's director, Strathford Hamilton, she relocated to Los Angeles where she pursued more work, ultimately continuing to work steadily across theater, film, and television.

Over the next few years, Anapau appeared in numerous productions, including the films Madison, the comedy 100 Girls, and The Opposite Sex, as well as TV series General Hospital and Once and Again.

At age 20, Anapau joined the girl group "3G's" and they landed a recording contract with Hollywood Records and they spent the better part of a year recording an album and opening for Destiny's Child on MTV's TRL Tour.

Anapau starred in the 2005 thriller Cursed, then appeared in the independent feature Self Medicated. She also starred as Cassidy Merteuil in Cruel Intentions 3. During this time, Anapau guest starred and recurred on many television series, including House, M.D., CSI:NY, Monk, Without A Trace, and Knight Rider.

Anapau also starred opposite comedian Dane Cook in the Sony Television produced pilot, Cooked.

=== Recent work (2009–present) ===
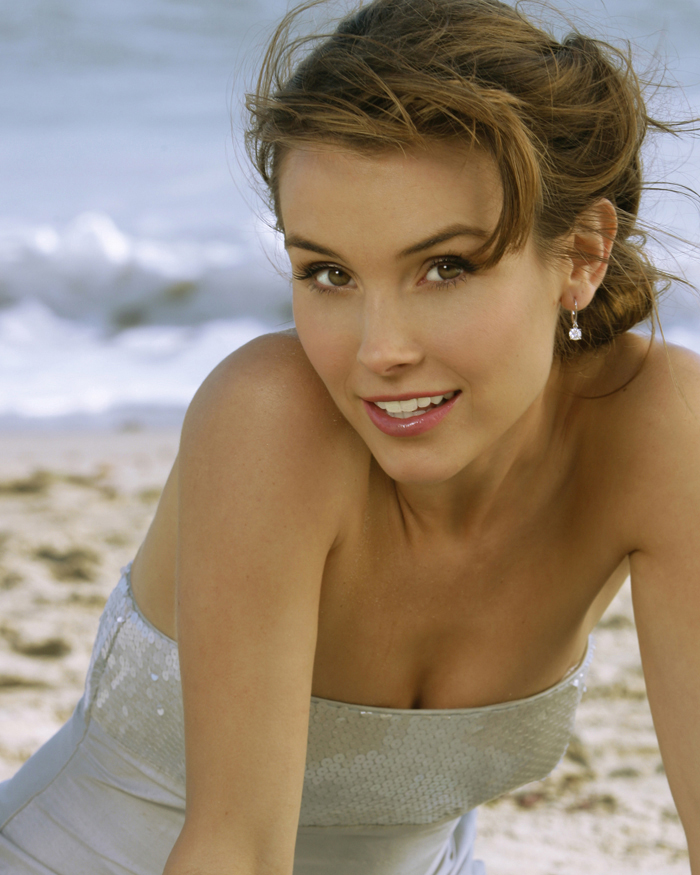
Kristina Anapau

In 2009, Anapau was cast in Black Swan, directed by Darren Aronofsky. "Darren is a genius whose focus and discipline on set is contagious", Anapau said in an interview, reflecting on her work in the 2010 film. "To say that working on Black Swan was inspiring would be an understatement."

Anapau then completed several independent films including The Speak and the paranormal thriller 5 Souls, which she also co-produced. She appeared on an episode of the AMC series The Glades and then went on to land the role of faerie, Maurella, in HBO's hit series, True Blood, appearing in five episodes over the fourth and fifth seasons.

In 2012, Anapau appeared on the NBC show Grimm, where she played "Megan Marston, a quiet, sheepish secretary working at a Wesen church who is actually a sheep-like creature dubbed a Seelengut".

Anapau starred as Theresa in the 2014 paranormal feature Altergeist (aka Sighting).

Anapau says she enjoys working in film and television equally, saying they have their "respective pleasures and challenges" and simply looks "for content that inspires me and hopefully elevates the world in some way—films have a track record of best fulfilling both the previous and the later, but there are some really incredible television shows out there that are doing the same. There is a lot of freedom to cross back and forth within the industry now."

==== True Blood ====
Anapau made her debut as the faerie Maurella on episode of 11 of True Blood's fourth season, and reprised the role in four episodes of the fifth season.

The actress told The Huffington Post in an interview that "It was such a privilege to join the cast of True Blood. I was a huge Alan Ball fan prior to joining the show-- I'm so fortunate to work with an amazing group of people, immensely talented actors and fantastic crew."

When asked about seeing a greater prevalence of strong, powerful female characters like those on True Blood, Anapau says, "Women audience members want to see strong women doing interesting things in film and on television – it's good for the industry and great for the world."

== Public image ==
Anapau has appeared on the cover of the Holiday 2012 issues of both Modern Luxury and Status LA magazine.

She has also been a cover model for magazines such as MUSE, Faerie, Prodijee, and Stuff. In January 2003, Anapau was ranked #98 on Stuff magazine's "103 Sexiest Women in the World".

== Other ventures ==
2012 marked Anapau's entry into the realm of editorial writing, with published articles in The Stndrd magazine, Status LA magazine, and The Hollywood Film Journal.

== Personal life ==
Anapau is married to otolaryngology specialist, Nathan E. Pierce.

== Filmography ==
=== Film ===
Year	Title	Role	Notes
2000	Locoweed & Other Discoveries	Elizabeth Ann	Video short
2000	100 Girls	Sasha	
2001	Madison	Tami Johnson	
2004	Cruel Intentions 3	Cassidy Merteuil	Video
2005	Cursed	Brooke	
2005	Self Medicated	Nicole	
2010	Black Swan	Galina / Little Swan	
2010	Verdict	Vanessa Thompson	Short
2011	The Speak	Paige Stone	
2011	Cornered	Jade	
2013	5 Souls	Jessica	
2014	SEAL Patrol	Lisa Westbrook	
2014	Altergeist	Thersea	
2014	4	Cora	Short
2015	Miss India America	Soap Opera Patient	
2017	Two Faced	Angela	
2017	Kuleana	Rose Coyle	

=== Television ===
Year	Title	Role	Notes
1997	General Hospital	Nurse Quinn	TV series
1997	Escape from Atlantis	Katriana	TV film
1997	Power Rangers Turbo	Myrtle	"Weight and See"
2000	Undressed	Roxy	Main role (season 3)
2000	Opposite Sex	Helen	"The Virgin Episode"
2001	Once and Again	Kimberly	"Best of Enemies"
2002	Haunted	Tierney Eastway	"Grievous Angels"
2002	They Shoot Divas, Don't They?	Tara Quinn	TV film
2003	For the People	Cissy Bunton	"Nexus"
2005	CSI: NY	Virginia Felton	"City of the Dolls"
2005	Cooked	Sydney	TV film
2006	Celebrity Deathmatch	Nicole Richie (voice)	"New Celebrity Deathmatch: Bigger & Better Then Ever"
2008	House	Marie	"Living the Dream"
2008	Monk	Amanda	"Mr. Monk Falls in Love"
2008	Knight Rider	Celine Lea	"Journey to the End of the Knight"
2008	Without a Trace	Emma Collins	"Cloudy with a Chance of Gettysburg"
2010	The Glades	Darcy Owens	"Second Chance"
2011–12	True Blood	Maurella	Recurring role (5 episodes)
2012	Grimm	Megan Marston	"The Good Shepherd"
2013	Anger Management	Erica	"Charlie and the Virgin"

== Awards and nominations ==
She won the Copper Wing Award at the 2006 Phoenix Film Festival for Best Ensemble for Self Medicated (2005).

Anapau won the Actress No Ka Oi award at the 2011 Big Island Film Festival.
