= Schlock (film) =

1973 film by John Landis

- Theatrical release poster
- Directed by: John Landis
- Written by: John Landis
- Produced by: Jack H. Harris; James C. O'Rourke
- Starring: John Landis; Eliza Garrett; Saul Kahan
- Cinematography: Robert E. Collins
- Edited by: George Folsey Jr.
- Music by: David Gibson
- Production company: Gazotskie Productions
- Distributed by: Jack H. Harris Enterprises
- Release dates: December 12, 1973 (U.S.); September 17, 1982 (West Germany)
- Running time: 79 minutes
- Country: United States
- Language: English
- Budget: $60,000 (estimated)

Schlock is a 1973 American comedy horror film written, directed by and starring filmmaker John Landis in his directorial debut.

The film depicts Schlock, an apeman in Southern California. After being attacked in his cave, the apeman wanders into a suburb and falls in love with Mindy Blinerman, an adolescent girl. His love is unrequited and he resorts to kidnapping the damsel in distress.

== Plot ==
Schlock is a prehistoric apeman who terrorizes Southern California. He emerges from his cavehole after a group of teenagers venture into it. The police, under Detective Sgt. Wino, is informed where the creature lives, and Professor Shlibovitz ventures into the hole to study the habitat. Schlock returns to the cave, and after a few hijinks, the people realize what he is.

The police try to apprehend Schlock but are powerless to do so. Schlock then ventures into the suburb. He is a menace to some and a friend to others. He falls in love with the beautiful blind teenager Mindy Blinerman. She is kind to Schlock at first, but after she regains her sight, she is terrified of him. Her boyfriend Cal defends her against Schlock by using a flare.

Schlock later crashes a school party and takes Mindy to the roof of the building. Cal uses a flare to get Schlock to drop Mindy. A small army regiment then shoots down the apeman, using two rounds of ammunition. Mindy quotes Love Story; "Love means never having to say you're sorry", while Professor Shilbovitz quotes King Kong; "It was beauty that killed the beast". Sgt. Wino asks him; "What's wrong with you?" At the end, Professor Shlibovitz emerges from the cave carrying Schlock's son.

== Cast ==
- John Landis as Schlock
- Saul Kahan as Detective Sergeant Wino
- Joseph Piantadosi as Officer Ivan
- Eliza Garrett as Mindy Blinerman
- Harriet Medin as Mrs. Blinerman (as Enrica Blankey)
- Eric Allison as Joe Putzman
- E.G. Harty as Professor Shlibovitz
- Charles Villiers as Cal
- Richard Gillis as Officer Gillis
- Tom Alvich as Torn Cop
- John Chambers as Captain
- Walter Levine as Police Thief
- Ralph Baker as Dying Man
- Gene Fox as Billy
- Susan Weiser as Betty
- Jonathan A. Flint as Bobby
- Amy Schireson as Barbara
- Belinda Folsey as Gloria

== Production ==
Shot in the summer of 1971, but not released until 1973, Schlock is the first credited film by John Landis, who also starred in the title role. The feature-length parody of 1950s monster movies was shot in 12 days in the Los Angeles area and had a budget of approximately $60,000, half of which came from Landis' personal savings. Aside from being Landis' first project as a director, the film is also notable for being one of the first jobs for makeup artist Rick Baker.

== Release and reception ==
Landis could not find a distributor interested in releasing the film until 1972 when it came to the attention of Johnny Carson. Carson loved the film and booked Landis as a guest on The Tonight Show, where clips were shown. It subsequently got released theatrically in the United States by Jack H. Harris Enterprises. It opened in Hollywood on December 12, 1973 and in West Germany on September 17, 1982.

The film helped the early careers of both John Landis and Rick Baker. However, Landis has described the film as "terrible".

On the review aggregator website Rotten Tomatoes, 75% of 8 critics' reviews are positive.

== Home media ==
The film was released on DVD by Anchor Bay Entertainment on October 2, 2001 and on Blu-ray by Arrow Films on October 16, 2018. The Blu-ray contains a restoration of the film from the original camera negative and interviews and TV spots as bonus features.

== See also ==
- List of American films of 1973
- List of films featuring fictional films
