= Christie Lynn Smith =

American actress (born 1969)

- Occupation: Actress
- Years active: 1991–present
- Spouse: John Fortson (m. 1998)
- Children: 2, including Abby
- Website: christielynnsmith.com

Christie Lynn Smith is an American actress best known for her role as Deardra Farnum in the 2010 film The Crazies.

== Career ==
Smith grew up mostly in Orange Park, Florida. Since 1991, she has guest starred in numerous television series including Beverly Hills, 90210, 7th Heaven, Charmed, Criminal Minds, Bones, Once and Again, Baywatch, JAG, CSI: Crime Scene Investigation, Malcolm in the Middle, House M.D., Grey's Anatomy and ER. She also appeared recurringly in Undressed and General Hospital.

Her film credits include Gods and Generals (2003) and The Crazies (2010), as well as a number of short films. She also appeared in an episode of Threshold, titled "The Burning".

== Personal life ==
Since 1998, Smith has been married to actor John Fortson. They have two children together, a daughter, Abby, born March 14, 2008, who is also an actress, and a son born on December 22, 2012.

== Filmography ==
=== Film ===
Year	Title	Role	Notes
2003	Gods and Generals	Catherine Corbin	
2003	What Boys Like	Susie	
2004	Inside Irvin	Ida Walter	
2005	Yesterday's Dreams	Vienna Hollister	
2007	Women on Top	Babs Elliot	
2009	The Seduction of Dr. Fugazzi	Madame Tulare	
2010	The Cursed	Marlene Muldoon	
2010	The Crazies	Deardra Farnum	
2012	Ticket Out	May	
2013	Assumed Killer	Sara	
2014	The M Word	Louisa	
2015	All Hallows' Eve 2	Loraine	
2017	Vikes	Officer Jonsson	
2023	The Other Zoey	Mrs. Wallace	

=== Television ===
Year	Title	Role	Notes
1991	Super Force	Cindy	Episode: "Of Human Bondage"
1992	Swamp Thing	Ashley-Dane Lansbury / Tory	2 episodes
1996	Forever	Erin Vincent	160 episodes
1996	Silk Stalkings	Wendy Turner	Episode: "Partners in Crime"
1997	Deep Family Secrets	Lisa Chadway	Television film
1997	Beyond Belief: Fact or Fiction	Josie	Episode: "Cup of Joe"
1997	Beverly Hills, 90210	Kristi Koontz	Episode: "Rebound"
1998	7th Heaven	Molly	Episode: "Time to Leave the Nest"
1998	Charmed	Allison Michaels	Episode: "The Wedding from Hell"
1999	Undressed	Annette	4 episodes
1999	Once and Again	Sherrie	Episode: "The Past Is Prologue"
1999	Malcolm & Eddie	Lynn	Episode: "Sneaky, Thieving, Double-Crossing Dates from Hell"
2000	Pensacola: Wings of Gold	Kathy Gibson	Episode: "At Poverty Level"
2000	Two Guys and a Girl	Annette Shaw	Episode: "Love Shack"
2000	Time of Your Life	Chloe	2 episodes
2001	Baywatch	Sarah	Episode: "The Return of Jessie"
2002	Three Sisters	Waitress	Episode: "Changing Rooms"
2002	JAG	Jill Kendrick	Episode: "Dangerous Game"
2002	Touched by an Angel	Joy Wren	Episode: "The Christmas Watch"
2003	CSI: Crime Scene Investigation	Jimmy's Mother	Episode: "Inside the Box"
2003	Strong Medicine	Cari Ferguson	Episode: "Misdiagnosis Murder"
2003, 2004	Malcolm in the Middle	Angela	2 episodes
2004	Eve	Woman	Episode: "Porn Free"
2005	McBride: Tune in for Murder	Sinclair	Television film
2005	House	Cindy Kramer	Episode: "Acceptance"
2005	Threshold	Condo Woman	Episode: "The Burning"
2005	Days of Our Lives	Rory Finch	2 episodes
2006	In Justice	Leah Sanders	Episode: "Another Country"
2006	Las Vegas	Preggo	Episode: "Fidelity, Security, Delivery"
2006	E-Ring	Gail Ellen	Episode: "Isolation"
2006	Monk	Valerie	Episode: "Mr. Monk Meets His Dad"
2006	Dexter	Soccer Mom	Episode: "Born Free"
2006, 2007	Bones	Caroline Epps	2 episodes
2007	ER	Marina Grasso	Episode: "Dying Is Easy..."
2007	Without a Trace	Tracey	Episode: "Crash and Burn"
2007–2008	General Hospital	Maureen Harper	8 episodes
2008	Boston Legal	Maureen Janely	Episode: "Rescue Me"
2009	Eleventh Hour	Fran Lieber	Episode: "Subway"
2009	Saving Grace	Stella Holmes	Episode: "That Was No First Kiss"
2009	Three Rivers	Lori Campbell	Episode: "Where We Lie"
2010	Castle	Melanie Kopek	Episode: "The Third Man"
2010	Backyard Wedding	Kayla Tyler	Television film
2010	All My Children	Betty	Episode #1.10482
2011	Justified	Gayle Cosgrove	Episode: "The Life Inside"
2011	Chase	Heather Nichols	Episode: "Father Figure"
2011	90210	Brooke Templeton	Episode: "The Prom Before the Storm"
2011	Weeds	Loren Vicks	Episode: "Une Mère Que J'aimerais Baiser"
2011	I Met a Producer and Moved to L.A.	Tracey	Television film
2012	NCIS	Cara Barnsway	Episode: "Housekeeping"
2012	Paging Dr. Freed	Karen	Television film
2014	Criminal Minds	Linda Westbrook	Episode: "The Boys of Sudworth Place"
2015	Togetherness	Jenny	Episode: "Kick the Can"
2015	I Didn't Do It	Connie	Episode: "Cheer Up Girls"
2016	Mother, May I Sleep with Danger?	Coral	Television film
2017	Grey's Anatomy	Cynthia Daniels	Episode: "Back Where You Belong"
2017	Urban Nightmares	Christy Kyle	7 episodes
2018–2019	A Girl Named Jo	Virginia Fitzroy	15 episodes
2019	Chicago Med	Lisa Kramer	Episode: "Old Flames, New Sparks"
2020	The Resident	Joyce	Episode: "Best Laid Plans"
2022	Station 19	Judy / Aston's Mom	Episode: "In My Tree"
