= The Other Woman (1983 film) =

1983 film by Melville Shavelson

- Genre: Comedy; Romance
- Written by: Lila Garrett; Anne Meara
- Directed by: Melville Shavelson
- Starring: Hal Linden; Anne Meara; Madolyn Smith
- Music by: Artie Butler
- Country of origin: United States
- Original language: English

Production
- Producer: Lila Garrett
- Cinematography: Isidore Mankofsky
- Editor: Robert Florio
- Running time: 120 minutes
- Production company: CBS Entertainment Productions

Original release
- Network: CBS
- Release: March 22, 1983

The Other Woman is a 1983 American made-for-television romantic comedy film directed by Melville Shavelson. The film was originally broadcast on CBS. It was the only television film directed by Shavelson that he did not also write.

== Cast ==
- Hal Linden as Lou Chadway
- Anne Meara as Peg Gilford
- Madolyn Smith as Cindy Barnes
- Warren Berlinger as Phil Gleason
- Joe Regalbuto as Jeff Marisol
- Alley Mills as Amy Vitelli
- P. J. Soles as Mary Louise
- Janis Paige as Mrs. Barnes
- Jerry Stiller as Mel Binns
- Selma Diamond as Aunt Jeanette
- Gregory Itzin as Mario
- Jane Dulo as Aunt Mae
- Fran Myers as Sherry Marisol
- Robert Picardo as Chuchi
- Stephen Nathan as Leslie
- Beverly Sanders as Linda Gleason
- Nita Talbot as Grace Binns
