= SEAL Patrol =

- DVD Cover
- Directed by: Nicolas Mezzanatto
- Written by: Nicolas Mezzanatto; Joshua Ringle
- Produced by: Brett Donowho; Joshua Ringle
- Starring: James C. Burns; Rich McDonald; Eric Roberts
- Cinematography: Edd Lukas
- Edited by: Laurens Van Charante
- Music by: Flipper Dalton
- Production companies: Quorum Entertainment; Rogue Satellite Productions; Tri-Fold Pictures
- Distributed by: Grindstone Entertainment Group; Lionsgate Home Entertainment
- Release date: February 11, 2014
- Running time: 80 minutes
- Country: United States
- Language: English

SEAL Patrol is a 2014 action-thriller film directed by Nicolas Mezzanatto and written by Mezzanatto and Joshua Ringle. Released straight-to-DVD on February 11, 2014, it stars James C. Burns, Kristina Anapau, Roark Critchlow, Rich McDonald and Eric Roberts.

== Premise ==
After losing contact with a clandestine energy research facility, a powerful venture capitalist contracts a private team of elite military operatives to retrieve a physicist who holds the key to an unprecedented alternate energy source.

== Cast ==
- Kristina Anapau as Lisa Westbrook
- James C. Burns as Lewis Locke
- Tina Casciani as Sarah
- Courtney Compton as Journalist
- Jose Luis Cordovez as Chechen Terrorist
- Roark Critchlow as Dr. Whitmore
- Josh Daugherty as Ed Cox
- Brett Donowho as Vincent "V" Hightower
- Danny James as Creature
- Angel McCord as Allison Whitmore
- Rich McDonald as Jonathan Gates
- James C. Morris as Creature
- Will Newman as Chechen Leader
- Daniel O'Meara as Jeffery Preston
- Eric Roberts as Mr. Cromwell
- Joshua St. James as Henry Cox
