= Love Is a Gun (1994 film) =

Erotic thriller film

- Original VHS release poster
- Directed by: David Hartwell
- Written by: David Hartwell
- Produced by: Jonathan D. Krane
- Starring: Eric Roberts; Kelly Preston
- Cinematography: Charlie Lieberman
- Edited by: Marc Grossman
- Music by: Fred Myrow
- Production company: Trimark
- Release date: 1 June 1994
- Running time: 92 min
- Country: United States
- Language: English

Love Is a Gun is a 1994 straight-to-video erotic thriller film directed and written by David Hartwell and starring Eric Roberts and Kelly Preston.

== Plot ==
Jack Hart, a novice LAPD crime-scene-photographer, is experiencing marital problems when he discovers a poster of an enigmatic woman. After attempting to enter a photo contest at the Forensics Department, he tracks down the model, a photographer in her own right, Jean Starr. Hart becomes infatuated with Starr, and the two enter an affair, much to the dismay of their respective spouses. Starr proves to be manipulative and vengeful and begins stalking Hart and his wife after he attempts to end their relationship. Starr ends up dead, with Hart as an obvious suspect.

== Cast ==
- Eric Roberts as Jack Hart
- Kelly Preston as Jean Starr
- Eliza Roberts as Isabel
- R. Lee Ermey as Frank Deacon
- Joseph Sirola as Al Kinder
- John Toles-Bey as Jay Liebowitz
- Jack Kehler as Boots Tynan
- Harvey Vernon as The Watchmaker
- Marshall Bell as Jean's husband
