= Deep Family Secrets =

1997 film by Arthur Allan Seidelman

- Genre: Drama
- Teleplay by: Nevin Schreiner; David Madsen; Dena Kleiman
- Story by: Dena Kleiman; Nevin Schreiner
- Directed by: Arthur Allan Seidelman
- Starring: Richard Crenna; Angie Dickinson; Molly Gross; Christie Lynn Smith
- Theme music composer: Chris Boardman
- Country of origin: United States
- Original language: English

Production
- Executive producers: Dick Clark; Neil Sterans
- Producer: Ira Marvin
- Cinematography: Hanania Baer
- Editors: Lance Anderson; Toni Morgan
- Running time: 96 minutes

Original release
- Network: CBS
- Release: April 15, 1997

Deep Family Secrets is a 1997 American drama television film directed by Arthur Allan Seidelman, that first aired on April 15, 1997 on the CBS television network.

The film is based on the true story of Gaylynn Earl Morris, who was convicted in 1992 of the murder of his wife, Ruby Morris, after Ruby disappeared in 1989. The names were changed to Clay and Renee Chadway in the television movie.

== Plot ==
Renee has just surprised her husband, Clay, with her younger sister, Ellen, while they are at a restaurant. This impromptu meeting persuades her that her husband is cheating on her. Devastated, Renee returns home, hesitating to talk to her husband. Soon after, Renee disappears, mysteriously.

JoAnne, the couple's young daughter, does not know what to think of all these events and does not take long to bring back stories that had until then been carefully kept secret. Clay soon appears as the prime suspect in Renee's disappearance. Was she kidnapped or is it a murder?

== Cast ==
- Richard Crenna as Clay Chadway
- Angie Dickinson as Renee Chadway
- Molly Gross as JoAnne Chadway
- Craig Wasson as Jack Winters
- Meg Foster as Ellen
- Jeff Kaiser as Bobby Chadway
- Scott Paetty as Sam
- Christie Lynn Smith as Lisa Chadway
- Tony Musante as Lennox
- Christine Healy as Hadley Brood
- Christopher Titus as Cowboy #1

== Production ==
It was first announced in December 1992, under the title Dark Family Secrets: The Dawna Kay Wells Story. For unknown reasons, production did not begin until nearly five years later. Shooting for the film would occur between February and March 1997 in Los Angeles, California. Lead actress Molly Gross had recently made her film debut in the independent picture Slaves to the Underground, which premiered at the 1997 edition of the Sundance Festival.
