= Altergeist =

- Teaser poster
- Directed by: Tedi Sarafian
- Written by: Tedi Sarafian
- Produced by: Aaron Heck
- Starring: Kristina Anapau; Mark Hapka; David Weidoff
- Cinematography: Aaron Heck
- Edited by: Andrew Coutts; David W. Hagar
- Music by: Anthony Marinelli
- Production company: Heckart Studios
- Release date: August 25, 2014 (London FrightFest Film Festival)
- Running time: 91 minutes
- Country: United States
- Language: English

Altergeist (also known under its working title Sighting) is a 2014 science fiction horror film that was written and directed by Tedi Sarafian. The film had its world premiere on 25 August 2014 at the London FrightFest Film Festival and received a limited theatrical release in the United States on 7 November 2014. The film follows a group of paranormal investigators that find that trying to discover proof of the supernatural might be the death of them.

== Plot ==
The film follows aspiring television producer Theresa Augland who, after a string of unsuccessful ghost hunts, lands the opportunity of a lifetime when she convinces winery owner, Ashen Till, that her team of paranormal investigators should be the ones to search his family's vineyard, King's Ransom Winery.

The vineyard is known as one of the most haunted places in America. A heavily pregnant Theresa is determined to prove the existence of ghosts, but must confront the remote northern California wilderness in doing so. As she and her team set up their equipment and begin filming, ghostly figures and mysterious balls of light begin to appear.

== Cast ==
- Kristina Anapau as Theresa
- Mark Hapka as Dax
- David Weidoff as Ashen Till
- Linsey Godfrey as Sarah
- Brendan Fletcher as Jason
- Alexis Cruz as Mike
- Sarah Oh as Maya
- Olivia Stuck as Beatrice Blaine
- Richard Sarafian Jr. as Jim till
- Jessica Spotts as Rachel Till
- Ed Corbin as Henry Blaine
- Indy Sarafian as Rebecca

== Development ==
Plans to film Altergeist (then called Sighting) were first announced in 2011, and the film moved into post-production in November 2012. Michelle Rodriguez was initially set to star in the film, but later withdrew from filming. Sarafian took his inspiration for Altergeist from the Korbel Champagne Cellars in Guerneville, California, where Sarafian and producer Aaron Heck listened to stories about strange occurrences and a suicide in the winery's Korbel House, which also served as the set for Altergeist.

== Reception ==
Grolsch Film Works praised Altergeist, writing that it "fully exploits its unusual vineyard setting, makes fun of its own hackneyed tropes..., and finds novel ways to reverse-engineer an apparent ghost story into something with a rather different genre frame." Fangoria gave the film three out of four skulls, writing that "Despite its dark setting and often fairly horrific murder sequences, ALTERGEIST is light hearted stuff, with clever banter and humor amongst the group of hunters, and actor Brendan Fletcher (FREDDY vs. JASON) being exceptionally funny throughout."

Other reviews were more critical. Moria called the film "about as generic as they come" and described its scares as "tepid and eminently forgettable", while noting that the ending took the film in a more unusual direction. Jacob Hopkins of Modern Horrors criticized the acting as "abysmal" and the story as "old and tired", calling the film "tedious, atrocious, insipid".
