= Insite (film) =

- Film poster
- Directed by: Jere Koistinen
- Written by: Jere Koistinen; Alaric Longward
- Produced by: Jere Koistinen
- Starring: Cameron Duckett; Keenan Proctor; Janni Hussi; Eric Roberts
- Cinematography: Miska Karioja
- Edited by: Jere Koistinen
- Music by: Tiko Lasola
- Production company: Rainy Day Entertainment
- Distributed by: Rainy Day Entertainment
- Release date: 4 November 2022 (Finland)
- Running time: 111 min
- Country: Finland
- Language: English

Insite is a 2022 Finnish independent action drama film written, produced and directed by Jere Koistinen. It tells the story of a young American man who hears that his father, who lives in Finland, has died and left a large fortune to his son, which prompts him to travel to Finland with a friend to escape his own problems. The film stars Cameron Duckett, Keenan Proctor, Janni Hussi and Eric Roberts.

== Plot ==
Kenneth (Jarkko Tamminen) has developed a sophisticated stock market manipulation program called "Insite". However, he is not ready to bring it to market yet, much to the disappointment of his financier Derek (Eric Roberts). Later, Kenneth dies in a deliberately caused car accident. His assistant Nita's (Janni Hussi) duty is to inform Kenneth's son Ryan (Cameron Duckett), who lives in Los Angeles, of his father's death, even though they have been estranged for twenty years. Coincidentally, Ryan and his really lousy business best friend, who calls himself Jerry McBusiness (Keenan Proctor), aren't doing too well because they owe Jerry's fiancée's mobster brother, so the friends feel this motivates them to go on the trip. Nita sends a private jet to pick the young men up to a luxurious villa on the shores of Lake Saimaa in Varkaus to take over Kenneth's business. When they arrive, the easy life is counterbalanced by complex patterns of deception and intrigue.

== Cast ==
- Cameron Duckett as Ryan
- Keenan Proctor as Jerry McBusiness
- Janni Hussi as Nita
- Eric Roberts as Derek
- Antti Kyllönen as Leo
- Kamy D. Bruder as Clyde
- Taryn Kelly as Sarah
- Giuseppe Russo as Antonio
- Mia Ehrnrooth as Ivy
- Jarkko Tamminen as Kenneth

== Production ==
Insite was shot mainly in Finland (such as Varkaus and Kuopio), but also in Los Angeles. The film was produced without support from the Finnish Film Foundation or any distributors, so the independent production was both produced and distributed by the Rainy Day Entertainment company owned by director Jere Koistinen.

== Reception ==
The film has received negative reception from critics; among others, Hannu Liekso from Episodi gave the film one star out of five, saying that the film is "an incredibly clumsy attempt to make a crime thriller, failing in every way".
