= Something (film) =

2018 horror film

- Directed by: Stephen Portland
- Screenplay by: Stephen Portland
- Starring: Michael Gazin; Jane Rowen; Joel Clark Ackerman; Eric Roberts
- Release dates: February 28, 2018 (Festival release); March 1, 2019 (Limited Theatrical); March 5, 2019 (Video On Demand)
- Running time: 86 minutes
- Budget: US$25,000

Something is a 2018 microbudget mystery horror film written and directed by Stephen Portland in his feature directorial debut.

== Plot ==
Two new parents struggle to look after their new baby, while becoming concerned that an intruder might be entering their home.

== Cast ==
- Michael Gazin as Man
- Jane Rowen as Woman
- Joel Clark Ackerman as Cop
- Eric Roberts as Coroner

== Critical reception ==
On Rotten Tomatoes, the film has an approval rating of 50% based on 6 reviews, indicating a mixed reception. Owen Gleiberman of Variety writing "“Something” has a few observations to make about the perils of contemporary parenthood, but instead of whipping them into tension it douses them in catch-as-catch-can thriller vagueness." Kimber Myers of Los Angeles Times wrote that the film did not live up to the potential of its premise, and had "few scares and a mystery without answers." Lorry Kikta of Film Threat wrote, "Something is a masterfully intelligent, delightfully spooky meditation on the dark side of being a first-time parent."
