= Harvey Vernon =

American actor (1927–1996)

- Born: Chet Smith; June 30, 1927; Flint, Michigan
- Died: October 9, 1996 (aged 69); Sun Valley, California
- Occupation: Actor
- Years active: 1976-1996

Harvey Vernon (June 30, 1927 – October 9, 1996) was an American actor from Flint, Michigan. His birth name was Chet Smith.

Perhaps his most famous role was Jasper DeWitt in the television series Carter Country. He also appeared in motion pictures as diverse as MacArthur, Teen Wolf and Someone to Watch Over Me.

Vernon's earliest guest starring roles include appearances in The Rockford Files, The Dukes of Hazzard, Cagney & Lacey and Touched by an Angel.

In 1986 and In the 1990s, he guest starred on Highway to Heaven, The Golden Girls, Star Trek: Deep Space Nine (in the episode "Equilibrium"),Beverly Hills, 90210 in Season 4 episode 10 and in The Larry Sanders Show.

== Filmography ==
Year	Title	Role	Notes
1977	MacArthur	Admiral Sherman	
1982	The American Adventure	Sailor	Voice
1982	They Call Me Bruce?	Officer Hangten	
1984	All of Me	Judge	
1985	Teen Wolf	Old Man Clerk	
1985	Stoogemania	Beverly's Dad	
1985	First Strike	Duncan	
1987	Someone to Watch Over Me	Giddings	
1987	The Killing Time	Dick	
1994	Monkey Trouble	Harold Weller	
1994	Love Is a Gun	The Watchmaker	
