= Assumed Killer =

- Directed by: Bernard Salzmann
- Written by: Bernard Salzmann
- Produced by: Barbie Castro; Bernard Salzmann
- Starring: Casper Van Dien; Armand Assante; Christie Lynn Smith; Eric Roberts
- Cinematography: Bernard Salzmann
- Edited by: Brett Hedlund
- Music by: Chad Rehmann
- Production company: Concord Films
- Distributed by: MarVista Entertainment
- Release date: November 1, 2013
- Running time: 87 minutes
- Country: United States
- Language: English

Assumed Killer (also titled Assumed Memories) is a 2013 American thriller drama film written and directed by Bernard Salzmann and starring Casper Van Dien, Barbie Castro, Armand Assante, Christie Lynn Smith and Eric Roberts. Salzmann and Castro produced the film and Van Dien served as co-producer.

== Cast ==
- Casper Van Dien as Sam Morrow
- Barbie Castro as Daria Valez Morrow
- Armand Assante as Aaron Banfield
- Christie Lynn Smith as Sara
- Eric Roberts as Taxi Driver
- William R. Moses as Dr. Green
- Nancy Stafford as Dr. Weston
- Antoni Corone as Detective Maurer
- Marc Macaulay as Chief Grimaldi
- Carmen Lopez as Clara
- Alexa Hamilton as Sophia Summerfield
- Cary Wayne Moore as Randy Summerfield

== Production ==
The film was shot in Fort Lauderdale, Florida.

== Reception ==
Sloan Freer of Radio Times gave the film two stars out of five.
