= Splash and Bubbles =

American children's television series

- Also known as: Jim Henson's Splash and Bubbles
- Genre: Adventure; Educational; Musical
- Created by: John Tartaglia
- Directed by: Bret Nilson; David Skelly; Hugh Martin
- Voices of: John Tartaglia; Leslie Carrara-Rudolph; Raymond Carr; Aymee Garcia
- Theme music composer: Mike Himelstein; Dena Diamond
- Opening theme: "Splash and Bubbles Theme Song"
- Composers: Andrew Skrabutenas; Mike Barnett; Mike Himelstein
- Country of origin: United States
- Original language: English
- No. of episodes: 40 (including 1 TV movie)

Production
- Executive producers: Lisa Henson; Halle Stanford; John Tartaglia; Michael Shawn Lewis; Jill Shinderman; Julie Phillips; Merrill Puckett Miller
- Producer: Tom Keniston
- Editors: Jouvens Exantus; Phil Price
- Running time: 12 minutes
- Production companies: Herschend Studios; The Jim Henson Company

Original release
- Network: PBS, PBS Kids
- Release: November 23, 2016 – August 6, 2018

Splash and Bubbles (also known as Jim Henson's Splash and Bubbles) is an American animated children's television series created by John Tartaglia. The series debuted on PBS Kids on November 23, 2016, after Wild Kratts: Creatures of the Deep Sea. It is produced using motion capture that blends with animatronic interfaces which enables the crew to make animation.

== Premise ==
Splash and Bubbles follows a yellowback fusilier (though at times he and the narrator claim that he is a yellowtail fusilier), Splash, who settles in Reeftown after looking all over the ocean. He then befriends Bubbles, a mandarin dragonet, and the duo, along with friends Dunk and Ripple, explore the reef to venture and make new friends. Each episode also includes a documentary segment, Get Your Feet Wet, which features kids asking questions that are occasionally followed up by a musical number.

== Characters ==
=== Main ===
- Splash (voiced by John Tartaglia), the protagonist of the series, is an adventurous yellowback fusilier who settles in Reeftown after exploring the world for a new home.
- Bubbles (voiced by Leslie Carrara-Rudolph), Splash's best friend who is a tomboyish mandarin dragonet and likes being messy.
- Dunk (voiced by Raymond Carr) is an intellectual, but extremely nervous dog-faced pufferfish who serves as the comic relief of the group. He is also an artist, and can make art out of sand.
- Ripple (voiced by Aymee Garcia) is a pink Barbour's seahorse who lives with 499 brothers. She loves adventure and trying new things.

=== Recurring ===
- Lu (voiced by Donna Kimball) is a high-spirited footballfish who resides in the ocean abyss.
- Bob (voiced by Allan Trautman) is Lu's husband, a male footballfish.
- Biggie (voiced by Sarah Oh) is one of Lu's friends, a spookfish.
- Zee (voiced by Donna Kimball) is an adventurous zebra bullhead shark.
- Mayor Sting (voiced by Raymond Carr), an overconfident bluespotted ribbontail ray who is the mayor of Reeftown.
- Wave (voiced by Dan Garza) is Reeftown's day octopus traffic guard.
- Tidy (voiced by John Tartaglia) is an ablutomanic garabaldi, who serves as a kelp forest ranger.
- Gush (voiced by Allan Trautman) is an intelligent painted frogfish who is shown to have experience in dancing, helpful tips, and racing.
- Flo (voiced by Leslie Carrara-Rudolph) is a hawksbill sea turtle who acts as Reeftown's medical professional. She sings in the style of Karen Carpenter.
- Chompy (voiced by Aymee Garcia) is a pastel-colored parrotfish who experiences eating what she sees.
- Polly and Bell (voiced by Alice Dinnean and Donna Kimball) are peach-colored twin white-spotted jellyfish.
- Polly and Bell's siblings (voiced by Dorien Davies and Alice Dinnean) are the twin sisters of Polly and Bell.
- Charlie (Nickname: Papa) (voiced by Dan Garza) is a brownish goldish Barbour's seahorse which lives with Ripple and her 499 brothers.
- Ripple's 499 brothers (voiced by Leslie Carrara-Rudolph, Sarah Oh, Raymond Carr, and Donna Kimball) are all of the green Barbour's seahorses.
- Maury (voiced by John Tartaglia) is a quidnunc snowflake moray who lives in the caves and tunnels of Reeftown and is always eager to gather news of what goes on around the reef.
- Snap (voiced by Dan Garza) is a pistol shrimp who can't see very well, doesn't like moving and sometimes attacks with his big claw when he thinks they say "Now!"
- Scout (voiced by Donna Kimball) is a goby fish who helps and protects Snap.
- Denny (voiced by Sarah Oh) is a cleaner shrimp who acts as Reeftown's "dentist", and has an extensive knowledge of teeth.

== Episodes ==
No.	Title	Directed by	Written by	Original air date
1a	"Lu the Explorer"	Bret Nelson	Rachel Lipman	November 23, 2016
1b	"I've Got Rhythm?"	David Skelly	Mark Drop	November 23, 2016
2a	"I Only Have Eyespots for You"	David Skelly	Joe Purdy	November 24, 2016
2b	"Double Bubbles"	Bret Nelson	Rachel Lipman	November 24, 2016 (Note: This episode first aired a day early on a program called "Splash and Bubbles Premiere," which also aired the first episode.)
3a	"Cleaner of the Kelp"	Hugh Martin	Michael Foulke	November 25, 2016
3b	"How Bubbles Got Her Moves Back"	David Skelly	Denise Downer	November 25, 2016
4a	"Dunk the Artist"	Hugh Martin	Rachel Lipman	November 29, 2016
4b	"Ripple's Sea Dragons"	Hugh Martin	Joe Purdy	November 29, 2016
5a	"Tooth Treasure"	Bret Nelson	Dave Cain, Laura Sams, and Robert Sams	November 30, 2016
5b	"Race Around the Reef"	Bret Nelson	Jack Ferraiolo	November 30, 2016
6a	"Dunk's Cleaning" "Dunk's New Friend"	Drew Massey	Michael Foulke	December 1, 2016
6b	"Ripple's Whale of a Tale"	Bret Nelson	Michael Foulke	December 1, 2016
7a	"Golden Legs Gush"	Drew Massey	Michael Foulke	December 7, 2016
7b	"A Fish Called Mo"	Bret Nelson	Joe Purdy	December 7, 2016
8a	"Deflated Dunk"	Bret Nelson	Rachel Lipman	December 9, 2016
8b	"Kelp Forest Keepers"	Bret Nelson	Rachel Lipman	December 9, 2016
9a	"Splash's Swim School"	Bret Nelson	Joe Purdy	December 21, 2016
9b	"Light at the End of the Tunnel"	Bret Nelson	Mark Drop	December 21, 2016
10a	"Small But Mighty"	Bret Nelson	John Tartaglia	December 22, 2016
10b	"Washed Away"	Bret Nelson	Michael Foulke	December 22, 2016
11a	"Super Splash!"	Rita Peruggi	Mark Drop	January 17, 2017
11b	"Pearlene"	Rita Peruggi	Michael Foulke	January 17, 2017
12a	"Guess Who?"	Toben Seymour	Michael Foulke	January 18, 2017
12b	"Sleepless Sleepover"	Hugh Martin	John Tartaglia	January 18, 2017
13a	"The Kelp Needs Help"	David Skelly	John Tartaglia	January 19, 2017
13b	"Mountain of Fire"	Toben Seymour	Michael Kramer	January 19, 2017
14a	"One Big Ocean Part 1: "Reeftown Rangers""	Bret Nelson	Rachel Lipman	March 1, 2017
14b	"One Big Ocean Part 2: "Riding the Currents""	Bret Nelson	Michael Foulke	March 1, 2017
15a	"One Big Ocean Part 3: "The Fixer-Upper""	Bret Nelson	Rachel Lipman	March 2, 2017
15b	"One Big Ocean Part 4: "No Place Like Home""	Bret Nelson	John Tartaglia	March 2, 2017
16a	"The Greatest Treasure of All"	Bret Nelson	Michael Foulke	March 13, 2017
16b	"Crabulous"	David Skelly	Rachel Lipman	March 13, 2017
17a	"Here Comes the Hammerhead"	Bret Nelson	Ryan Toyama	March 14, 2017
17b	"Denny's New Shell"	Jason Devilliers	Michael Foulke	March 14, 2017
18a	"The Sand Is Grand"	David Skelly	Michael Kramer	March 15, 2017
18b	"The Treasure Trove"	David Skelly	Jennifer Skelly	March 15, 2017
19a	"Mayor for a Day"	Jason Devilliers	Mark Drop	March 16, 2017
19b	"Oblo From Down Below"	Rita Peruggi	Rachel Lipman	March 16, 2017
20a	"Chompy's New Foods"	Bret Nelson	Mark Drop	March 17, 2017
20b	"Cloning Around"	John Tartaglia	Ryan Toyama	March 17, 2017
21a	"The House Hunt"	John Tartaglia	Rachel Lipman	April 21, 2017
21b	"Dolphin Games"	David Skelly	Rachel Lipman	April 21, 2017
22a	"Partner Pals"	Bret Nelson	Rachel Lipman	May 25, 2017
22b	"Ultimate Hide and Seek"	David Skelly	Alice Dinnean	May 25, 2017
23a	"My Son, The Frogfish"	David Skelly	Rachel Lipman	June 12, 2017
23b	"A Day for Papa"	Christian Jacobs	Michael Foukle	June 12, 2017
24a	"Bubbles' Little Friend"	David Skelly	Rachel Lipman	June 13, 2017
24b	"Mrs. Tidy"	David Skelly	Rachel Lipman	June 13, 2017
25a	"The Lure of the Rocks"	David Skelly	Michael Foulke	June 14, 2017
25b	"What's the Story, Maury?"	Rachel Lipman	Allan Trautman	June 14, 2017
26a	"Smell of Fear"	Rita Peruggi	Michael Kramer	September 25, 2017
26b	"A New 'Spin'"	Bret Nelson	Jason Ansolabehere	September 25, 2017
27a	"Clubhouse Clash"	David Skelly	Rachel Lipman	September 26, 2017
27b	"Raise The Reef"	Bret Nelson	Michael Shawn Lewis	September 26, 2017
28a	"Stormy Waters"	Bret Nelson	Joe Purdy	September 27, 2017
28b	"Scoot On Over!"	Christian Jacobs	Michael Foulke	September 27, 2017
29a	"Puffy"	Jason Devilliers	Rachel Lipman	September 28, 2017
29b	"The Big Shake"	Bret Nelson	Ryan Toyama	September 28, 2017
30a	"Yuck Or Treat"	Michael Shawn Lewis	Michael Foulke	October 16, 2017
30b	"The Thing from Above The Reef"	Michael Shawn Lewis	Ryan Toyama	October 16, 2017
31a	"Whitebeard"	Bret Nelson	Dave Cain, Laura Sams, & Robert Sams	December 11, 2017
31b	"Coral Day"	Bret Nelson	John Tartaglia	December 11, 2017
32a	"Seal Sitters"	Michael Shawn Lewis	Michael Shawn Lewis	April 23, 2018
32b	"From Ray to Zee"	Jason Devilliers	Ryan Toyama	April 23, 2018
33a	"The Sea Sparkles"	Bret Nelson	Michael Foulke	April 24, 2018
33b	"Tyke and Seek"	Michael Shawn Lewis	Rachel Lipman	April 24, 2018
34a	"Light's Out!"	David Skelly	Michael Foulke	April 25, 2018
34b	"Catching some ZZZ's"	Bret Nelson	Jill Shinderman	April 25, 2018
35a	"The Job Search"	Jason Devilliers	Jennifer Skelley	April 26, 2018
35b	"Reeftown's Got Talent"	Jason Devilliers	John Tartaglia	April 26, 2018
36a	"Mo's Sunburn"	Bret Nelson	Katherine Lewis	June 11, 2018
36b	"Imagin-Ocean"	Bret Nelson	Joe Purdy	June 11, 2018
37a	"Gush's White Whale"	Bret Nelson	Eric De La Rosa	June 12, 2018
37b	"Extreme Clean"	Bret Nelson	Michael Foulke	June 12, 2018
38a	"The End of the Ocean"	David Skelly	Michael Foulke	June 13, 2018
38b	"Antarctic Ranger"	Allan Trautman	Michele Hennessy	June 13, 2018
39a	"Pole to Pole Part 1: "Migration Vacation""	Dave Messey	Rachel Lipman	August 6, 2018
39b	"Pole to Pole Part 2: "Pebbles""	Drew Massey	Rachel Lipman	August 6, 2018
40a	"Pole to Pole Part 3 "The Whistling Whale""	Dave Massey	Michael Foulke	August 6, 2018
40b	"Pole to Pole Part 4: "The Big Krill""	Dave Massey	Michael Foulke	August 6, 2018

== Film ==
Title	Original release date
"One Big Ocean"	January 16, 2017
The Reeftown kids catch the currents and embark on an epic journey across the sea to help a friendly young turtle named Scoot. Along the way they learn that all creatures are interconnected and how even a small gesture can greatly affect the friends and neighbors who share the one big ocean they call home.

== Songs ==
No.	Song	Episode(s)	Sung by
1	"And So We Celebrate (Coral Day)"	"Coral Day"	Everyone in Reeftown
2	"Catch A Current"	"Ripple's Sea Dragons", "Race Around the Reef", "Ripple's Whale of a Tale", "The Kelp Needs Help", "One Big Ocean Part 1: "Reeftown Rangers"", "The Greatest Treasure of All", "The Treasure Trove", “Gush's White Whale”	Splash (and sometimes, Bubbles, Dunk, Ripple, or Gush)
3	"Dark in the Deep"	"Lu the Explorer", "Mountain of Fire", "Yuck or Treat", "Lights Out!"	Lu, Bob, and the Firefly Squids
4	"Hanging With Friends"	"I Only Have Eyespots for You", "How Bubbles Got Her Moves Back", "Deflated Dunk", "A Fish Called Mo", "Light at the End of the Tunnel", "One Big Ocean Part 1: "Reeftown Rangers"", "Dolphin Games", "Ultimate Hide and Seek", "The Lure of the Rocks", "Bubbles' New Friend", "Raise the Reef"	Splash, Bubbles, Dunk, and Ripple
5	"Have You Heard?"	"Denny's New Shell", Mayor for a Day", "What's the Story, Maury?", "Smell of Fear", "Scoot on Over", "Reeftown's Got Talent!"	Maury
6	"I Don't Know What I'm Doin' (I'm Just Doin' It)"	"Dunk the Artist", "Washed Away", "One Big Ocean Part 3: "The Fixer-Upper"", "Puffy", "The Thing from Above the Reef", “Mo's Sunburn”	Dunk
7	"I Never Knew About You"	"Crabulous", "Denny's New Shell", "Cloning Around", "Dolphin Games", "My Son, The Frogfish", "From Ray to Zee", “Imagin-Ocean”, “The End of the Ocean”, "Pole-to-Pole Part 3: The Whistling Whale"	Splash and Bubbles
8	"Keep It Clean"	"Cleaner of the Kelp", "Kelp Forest Keepers", "Guess Who?", "Mrs. Tidy", "Seal Sitters", "The Job Search"	Tidy
9	"My Best Friend Ever"	"Partner Pals", "A New ‘Spin’", "The Sea Sparkles", "Pole-to-Pole Part 2: Pebbles"	Splash and Bubbles
10	"One Big Ocean"	"One Big Ocean Part 4: "No Place Like Home"", "Clubhouse Clash", "The Big Shake", "Pole-to-Pole Part 1: Migration Vacation"	Flo, Polly, Bell, Polly And Bell's Sibling #1, and Polly And Bell's Sibling #2
11	"One Small Ripple"	"Pearlene", "One Big Ocean Part 3: "The Fixer-Upper"", "A Day for Papa", "Whitebeard"	Ripple and her brothers
12	"Only In The Ocean"	"Oblo From Down Below", "Bubbles' Little Friend", "Ultimate Hide & Seek", “Gush's White Whale”, "Pole-to-Pole Part 4: The Big Krill"	Splash, Bubbles, Dunk and Ripple
13	"Reeftown Rangers"	"The Greatest Treasure of All", "Here Comes the Hammerhead", "The Treasure Trove", "Chompy's New Foods", "The House Hunt", "Stormy Waters", "Tyke And Seek", “Antarctic Ranger”	Splash, Bubbles, Dunk and Ripple
14	"Rhythm of the Reef"	"I've Got Rhythm?", "One Big Ocean Part 4: "No Place Like Home"", "Raise the Reef", "Pole-to-Pole Part 4: The Big Krill"	Everyone in Reeftown
15	"Yucky"	"Double Bubbles", "A Fish Called Mo", "One Big Ocean Part 2: "Riding the Currents"", "The Sand is Grand", "Oblo from Down Below", "Catching Some ZZZs"	Bubbles

== Home media ==
Region	Title	Release date	Running time	Aspect ratio	Notes
1	‘’One Big Ocean’’	June 12, 2018	1.2 minutes	1:78:1	
1	‘’The Kelp Forest’’	May 21, 2019		1:78:1	

== Awards and nominations ==
Year	Award	Category	Recipients and nominees	Result	Refs
2017	44th Annie Awards	Outstanding Achievement, Voice Acting in an Animated TV/Broadcast Production	Leslie Carrara-Rudolph for "I Only Have Eyespots for You"/"Double Bubbles"	Nominated	
