= Eliza Roberts (actress) =

American casting director and producer

- Born: Eliza Garrett; Los Angeles, California, US
- Occupations: Actress, casting director, film producer, screenwriter, acting coach
- Years active: 1973–present
- Spouse: Eric Roberts (m. 1992)
- Children: Keaton Simons
- Parents: David Rayfiel (father); Lila Garrett (mother)
- Relatives: Leo F. Rayfiel (grandfather)

Eliza Roberts, born Eliza Garrett, is an American casting director, actor, producer, screenwriter, and acting coach. Married to actor Eric Roberts, she is also his talent manager.

== Early life and education ==
Eliza Garrett was born in Los Angeles. She is the daughter of screenwriters David Rayfiel and Lila Garrett.

At 18, she received her diploma.

== Career ==
=== Actress ===
In 1973, she left everything behind to pursue her acting career. Her first film role was in Schlock, released in 1973, where she starred alongside John Landis, who also directed the film. In 1978, she was rehired by the same director and appeared in the comedy National Lampoon's Animal House. During the filming, she was expecting her first child, Keaton.

In 1994, she portrayed Lara Lor-Van, Superman’s mother, in an episode of Lois & Clark: The New Adventures of Superman. In 1996, she played Miranda in a Doctor Who franchise film.

In 2021, she starred alongside her husband in The Tasmanian Devil, directed by Hussain Ahmad. For this, she won two awards, including Best Actress at the Toronto Independent Film Festival in 2022.

In 2023, she co-produced the film My Last Best Friend, which won Best Feature Film at the Athens Digital International Film Festival in Greece.

=== Casting director ===
Her first experience as a casting director was for the CBS sitcom Baby... I'm Back!. This series was created by her mother, Lila Garrett, and Mort Lachman. She resumed this role eight years later for the shows You Again? and Throb, and in 1990 for the series Midnight Caller, among others.

=== Producer ===
In 2012, she started her film production career with the movie Letting Go, in which she also acted. She went on to produce both short films and feature films, often casting herself, her husband, or her mother in roles.

== Personal life ==
From her first marriage to producer James Simons (Malcolm in the Middle), she has two children: Keaton Simons (born in 1978), a musician, and Morgan, a pastry chef.

In 1986, she met Eric Roberts on a plane while he was still dating Kelly Cunningham. They split in 1991, and the same year, Eric and Eliza began dating and married on August 16, 1992.

In 1995, a dispute occurred with her husband at their home, leading to his arrest and detention for hitting her on the head. He posted his own bail of $50,000 to be released. Eliza gave Eric an ultimatum: he had to get clean [from cocaine] if he didn't want to lose her. The court also mandated that Eric undergo an 18-month rehabilitation program.

As Eric's manager, Eliza revitalized his career.

Roberts maintains a good relationship with her stepdaughter, actress Emma Roberts.

In the film industry, she is the godmother of Mason Ewing.

== Philanthropy ==
Eliza Roberts advocates for child protection alongside actor and author Steve Pemberton and producer Sharon LeCoque.
