= Keaton Simons =

American musician

- Keaton Simons

Background information
- Born: July 20, 1978 (age 47)
- Origin: Los Angeles, California, U.S.
- Genres: Rock; soul
- Occupations: Singer, songwriter
- Label: Best Revenge
- Website: keatonsimons.com

Keaton Simons (born July 20, 1978) is an American recording and performing artist. He is signed to Best Revenge Records, an independent label he created in 2012. His music has been featured on shows like Sons of Anarchy, Hollywood Heights, Private Practice, NCIS: Los Angeles, Crash, Suits, American Dad!, Harper's Island, and The Cleaner.

In the spring of 2013, Simons released his second full-length album Beautiful Pain on Best Revenge Records. The album was co-produced with Mikal Blue and mastered by Gavin Lurssen of Lurssen Mastering. It includes songs Simons co-wrote with Jason Mraz, Jason Reeves, Glen Phillips, Mikal Blue, and others. With the exception of drums, which are played by Robin DiMaggio, the United Nations' musical directo, all instruments on Beautiful Pain were played by Simons.

Additional featured artists on the record include Alex Al (bass), Lenny Castro (percussion), Zac Rae (keys), Tyler Hilton (piano, vocals), Tower of Power's Bill Churchville (trumpet, trombone), and Sean Hill (saxophone). Simons' debut EP Currently was released on Maverick Records in 2004 and his debut Can You Hear Me, a full-length album, was released on CBS Records in 2008. He toured nationally and internationally, opening for Coldplay, Train, Guster, and REO Speedwagon amongst others. He has also worked as a writer, musical director, singer, bassist, and guitarist with notable acts like Chris Cornell, Gnarls Barkley, Snoop Dogg, Josh Kelley, and Tre Hardson.

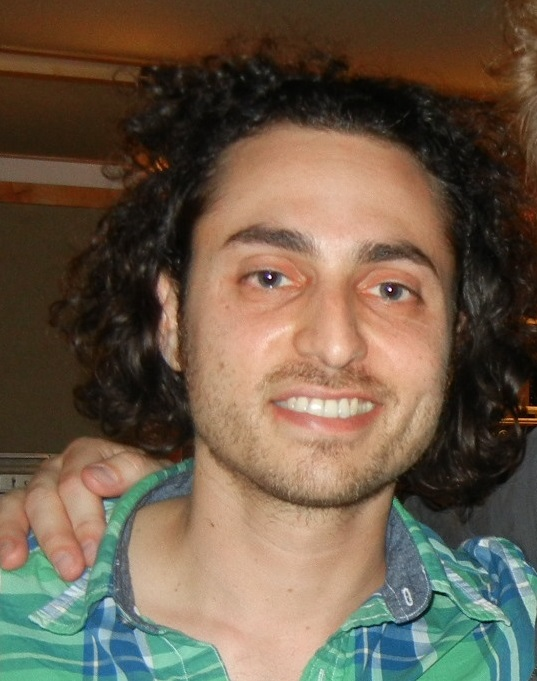
Simons in 2011

In 2011, Simons appeared on VH1's Celebrity Rehab with Dr. Drew alongside his stepfather, actor Eric Roberts, who was a patient. A performance of his song “Unstoppable” on the show had over 10,000 iTunes downloads in only two days.

He has made guest appearances on The Late Late Show with Craig Ferguson, Malcolm in the Middle, and American Dreams. He appeared in the feature film Hollywood Dreams. He made a cameo in the 2013 season finale of Showtime's Californication; he was on screen with David Duchovny and Maggie Grace. Duchovny wrote songs for Simons' 2015 album Hell or Highwater while sitting in on sessions with Simons. Simons has the distinction of being on the set of a major motion picture before birth. His mother, Eliza Roberts, then Eliza Garrett, was pregnant with him when she appeared as "Brunella" in National Lampoon's Animal House.

Simons lives in California and Nashville. He plays lead guitar with Brett Young.
