= Eric Roberts =

American actor (born 1956)

- Roberts in 2025
- Born: Eric Anthony Roberts; April 18, 1956 (age 70); Biloxi, Mississippi, U.S.
- Occupation: Actor
- Years active: 1974–present
- Works: Full list
- Spouse: Eliza Garrett (m. 1992)
- Partners: Sandy Dennis (1980–1985); Kelly Cunningham (1988–1991)
- Children: Emma Roberts
- Relatives: Julia Roberts (sister); Lisa Roberts Gillan (sister); David Rayfiel (father-in-law); Lila Garrett (mother-in-law); Daniel Moder (brother-in-law)

Eric Anthony Roberts (born April 18, 1956) is an American actor. He has amassed more than 700 credits and is one of the most prolific English-speaking screen actors, acting in 74 films in 2017 alone.

Roberts's career began with a leading role in King of the Gypsies (1978) for which he received his first Golden Globe Award nomination. He also received a Golden Globe nomination for his role as Paul Snider in Bob Fosse's Star 80 (1983). Roberts's performance in Runaway Train (1985), as prison escapee Buck McGeehy, earned him a third Golden Globe nod and a nomination for the Academy Award for Best Supporting Actor.

Notable films Roberts has appeared in include Raggedy Man (1981), The Pope of Greenwich Village (1984), The Coca-Cola Kid (1985), Best of the Best (1989), The Ambulance (1990), Final Analysis (1992), The Specialist (1994), The Cable Guy (1996), It's My Party (1996), Cecil B. Demented (2000), National Security (2003), A Guide to Recognizing Your Saints (2006), The Dark Knight (2008), The Expendables (2010), Lovelace (2013), Inherent Vice (2014), The Human Centipede 3 (2015), and Babylon (2022).

On television, his performances in the drama miniseries In Cold Blood (1997) and the sitcom Less than Perfect (2002–2005) have earned him Satellite Award nominations, winning Best Supporting Actor for the latter. His other varied television work includes being the only non-British actor to play the Master in the 1996 Doctor Who television film, the Stalked by My Doctor (2015–2021) Lifetime television film series, as well as recurring roles on the NBC drama Heroes (2007–2010), the CBS soap opera The Young and the Restless (2010–2011), the legal drama Suits (2014–2019), and the HBO series The Righteous Gemstones (2022).

== Early life ==
Eric Anthony Roberts was born in Biloxi, Mississippi, on April 18, 1956, to Betty Lou Bredemus and Walter Grady Roberts, one-time actors and playwrights, who met while touring with a production of George Washington Slept Here for the armed forces. In 1963, they co-founded the Atlanta Actors and Writers Workshop in Atlanta off Juniper Street in Midtown. They ran a children's acting school in Decatur, Georgia. Roberts's mother became a church secretary and real estate agent, and his father was a vacuum cleaner salesman. Roberts's younger siblings, Julia Roberts (from whom he was estranged until 2004) and Lisa Roberts Gillan, are also actors.

In 1971, Roberts's parents filed for divorce, which was finalized in early 1972. He stayed with his father, who died of cancer in March 1977, in Atlanta. After the divorce, his sisters moved with their mother to Smyrna, a suburb of Atlanta. In 1972, their mother married Michael Motes. In 1976, they had a daughter, Nancy Motes, who died February 9, 2014, at age 37, of an apparent drug overdose. Michael Motes was abusive and often unemployed. In 1983, Roberts's mother divorced Motes, citing "cruelty"; she later said that marrying him was the biggest mistake of her life.

== Career ==
He made his acting debut in 1974, appearing on the soap opera How to Survive a Marriage. He also appeared on the NBC daytime soap opera Another World originating the role of Ted Bancroft from February 14 to June 17, 1977.

Roberts received Golden Globe Award nominations for his early starring roles in King of the Gypsies (1978) and Star 80 (1983). He was nominated for the Academy Award for Best Supporting Actor in 1985 for his role as the escaped convict Buck in the film Runaway Train; the award went to Don Ameche for Cocoon. In 1987, he won the Theatre World Award for his Broadway debut performance in Burn This.

Roberts's other starring roles included Paul's Case (1980), Raggedy Man (1981), The Pope of Greenwich Village (1984), The Coca-Cola Kid (1985), Nobody's Fool (1986), Best of the Best (1989), By the Sword (1991), Final Analysis (1992), Best of the Best 2 (1993), The Specialist (1994), The Immortals (1995), It's My Party (1996), La Cucaracha (1998), and Purgatory (1999).

He appeared in the 1996 Doctor Who television film as a paramedic, Bruce, whose body is possessed by the recurring villain the Master. Bruce's wife, who is killed by the Master, was played by Roberts's wife Eliza Garrett. He also co-starred in the 1996 television miniseries version of In Cold Blood, in the role of Perry Smith; he was nominated for a Satellite Award for Best Actor – Miniseries or Television Film. He starred in C-16 for its entire 1997 to 1998 run. He starred opposite John Ritter in the movie Tripfall in 1998. He played the Archangel Michael in The Prophecy II (1997).

Roberts co-starred on the ABC situation comedy Less than Perfect. He appeared in an episode of CSI: Miami as Ken Kramer, a murderer on death row convicted of killing a young couple. Another notable TV appearance was the episode "Victims" of Law & Order: Special Victims Unit where he played Sam Winfield, a former cop turned vigilante. In the same year, he was also guest-starred on The L Word as Gabriel McCutcheon, the father of Shane McCutcheon.

Roberts voiced the Superman villain Mongul in the animated series Justice League, and reprised his role in Justice League Unlimited in the episode "For the Man Who Has Everything". He performed the voice of Dark Danny in Nickelodeon's Danny Phantom. He appeared in the first season of Heroes as Thompson, an associate of Mr. Bennet. He then reprised the role in the third-season episode "Villains" and in the fourth-season "The Wall".

=== 2000–2008 ===
In 2000, Roberts played a serial killer in The Flying Dutchman. In 2002, he portrayed an FBI detective in Ja Rule's music video for his song "Down Ass Bitch", as well as its sequel "Down 4 U".

In 2003, Roberts also appeared in The Killers' music video for their song "Mr. Brightside", later reprising the role in the music video for their 2012 single "Miss Atomic Bomb".

In 2005, he appeared in the music videos for Mariah Carey's "We Belong Together" and "It's Like That".

In 2006, he starred in the drama movie A Guide to Recognizing Your Saints. The movie was a success and earned $2,035,468 at the box-office and holds a 75% rating on Rotten Tomatoes. He appeared in the video for Akon's "Smack That", featuring Eminem. The same year, he had a role in the romantic comedy film Phat Girlz, starring Mo'Nique, which generated $7,401,890 in theaters worldwide. He had a major role in the British-German-American martial arts action film DOA: Dead or Alive, based on the famous videogame of the same name, which grossed $7.5 million on a budget of $30 million.

In early January 2007, Roberts starred in the two-part miniseries Pandemic as the mayor of Los Angeles. In 2007, he appeared in the video for Godhead's "Hey You". He appeared as a panelist on the television game show Hollywood Squares.

On July 18, 2008, he appeared in The Dark Knight as Sal Maroni, a Gotham City Mafia boss who hires The Joker to kill Batman and a renegade mob accountant.

=== 2009–2011 ===
In February 2009, Oscar nominee Mickey Rourke, who starred with Roberts in The Pope of Greenwich Village, said he hoped that Roberts would soon be offered a role which would resurrect his career in the way that The Wrestler rejuvenated Rourke's. He portrayed Seth Blanchard on the second season of the Starz series Crash, from 2009. In 2009, Roberts appeared as himself in "Tree Trippers", a season five episode of Entourage. He is portrayed as a mushroom and drug fanatic as he gives the boys mushrooms and joins them in Joshua Tree National Park to trip as they contemplate Vince's next movie decision. The same year, he appeared in the independent movie The Chaos Experiment, starring Val Kilmer which had a limited theatrical release, playing to small audiences on two screens for one week in Grand Rapids, and for one week in nearby Lansing. He also appeared in the independent movie Rock Slyde, starring Patrick Warburton, Andy Dick, Rena Sofer, and Elaine Hendrix. He had the main role in the action movie The Butcher. He was acted in the psychological thriller film Royal Kill. He also appeared in the Canadian-American thriller Bloodwork.

It was announced in June 2010 that he would be joining the cast of the CBS soap opera The Young and the Restless starting July 12. The following month saw the release of the action film The Expendables in which Roberts plays a lead villain. It was directed by and starred Sylvester Stallone, with Jason Statham, Jet Li, Steve Austin, Gary Daniels, Dolph Lundgren, Randy Couture, Terry Crews, David Zayas, and Mickey Rourke. The film is about a group of elite mercenaries called The Expendables (Stallone, Statham, Li, Lundgren, Couture, and Crews) who are on a mission to overthrow dictator General Garza (Zayas) in Vilena, an island in the Gulf of Mexico. It is revealed that an ex-CIA officer James Munroe (Roberts) is keeping Garza in power as a figurehead for his own profiteering operations. With his two deadly bodyguards Dan Paine (Austin) and The Brit (Daniels), they become a major obstacle in the way of The Expendables. Later that year, he appeared with Steve Austin and Gary Daniels, his co-stars from The Expendables, in the 2010 action film Hunt to Kill. In October 2010, he played the major role in the American family movie First Dog, which received positive reviews. December 2010 saw the premiere of the fourth season of Celebrity Rehab with Dr. Drew, which documented Roberts's struggle with dependency on medical marijuana. His wife Eliza and his stepson Keaton Simons appeared in episode 6 to discuss the effects of his addiction on their lives.

In 2011, he guest-starred in USA Network's Burn Notice season 5 finale ("Fail Safe") as an "off the books" spy recruiter. In the same year, he acted in the drama and family film Shannon's Rainbow, based on Mowod's own experiences seeing his brother rehabilitate an injured horse and win a championship horse race. Later that year he acted in the horror comedy anthology film Chillerama, consisting of four stories, with each segment being an homage to a different genre and style. The movie was acclaimed by critics and has gained a cult following.

=== 2012–2015 ===
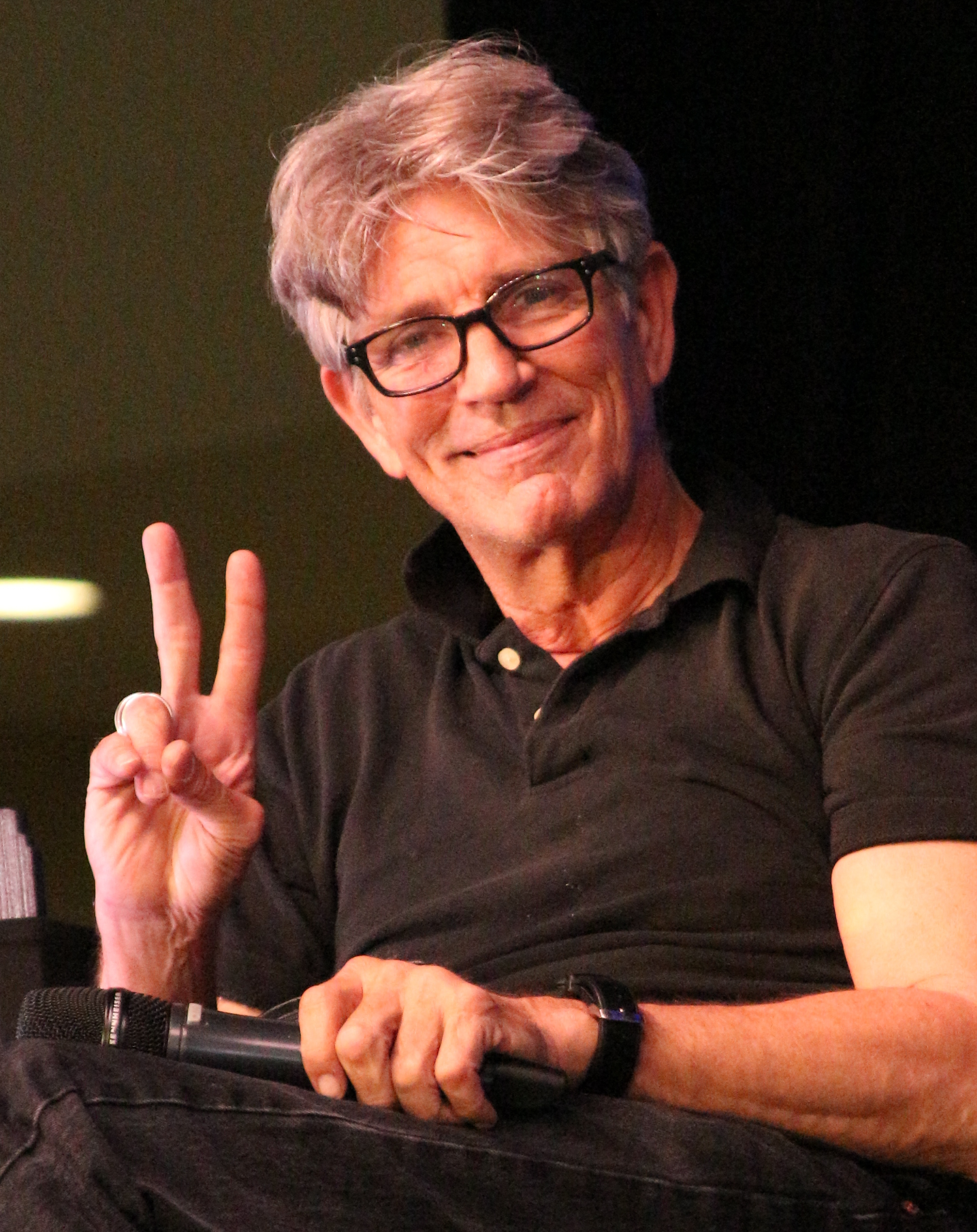
Roberts at the 2015 Florida Supercon

Roberts starred in the 2012 mystery thriller Deadline, playing the role of politically incorrect reporter Ronnie Bullock. He appeared in the horror film Snow White: A Deadly Summer, directed by David DeCoteau. He is featured as Uncle Shadrack, head of a Romani family, in 2012's The Finder on FOX. He had a recurring role in the TV series The Finder as a gypsy who had the title of king among a gypsy community in southern Florida. The same year, he was starred in the catastrophe movie The Mark. He also appeared in the Christmas comedy film Christmas in Compton, starring Keith David and Omar Gooding, which received positive reviews.

On February 18, 2013, he was featured in independent children's film A Talking Cat!?!, directed by David DeCoteau. In 2013, he had a small role in the film Lovelace, a biopic film about adult film actress Linda Lovelace. The film had its world premiere on January 22, 2013, at the 2013 Sundance Film Festival and opened in a U.S. limited release on August 9, 2013. The same year, he was starred in the movie Pop Star, including the actors Christian Serratos, Robert Adamson, Ross Thomas and Rachele Brooke Smith. He had also in the drama film Before I Sleep, which received good critics and premiered in competition at the Heartland Film Festival on October 19, 2013. On November 1, 2013, he had a major role in the thriller drama film Assumed Killer, starring and produced by Casper Van Dien. The movie received good review and had the film two stars out of five. On November 24, 2013, he had voiced in the short animated movie Dante's Hell Animated.

In 2014, he appeared in the neo-noir period comedy-drama film Inherent Vice. The drama film Starcrossed, co-starring Mischa Barton, premiered at the San Diego International Film Festival on September 28, 2014. This was followed by a limited theatrical release in Los Angeles in May 2016. He had also a role in the small-budget indie film The Opposite Sex, starring Kristin Chenoweth, Mena Suvari, Jennifer Finnigan, and Geoff Stults, which received favorable reviews.

Between 2014 and 2015, Roberts played the recurring character Charles Forstman in the TV legal drama Suits.

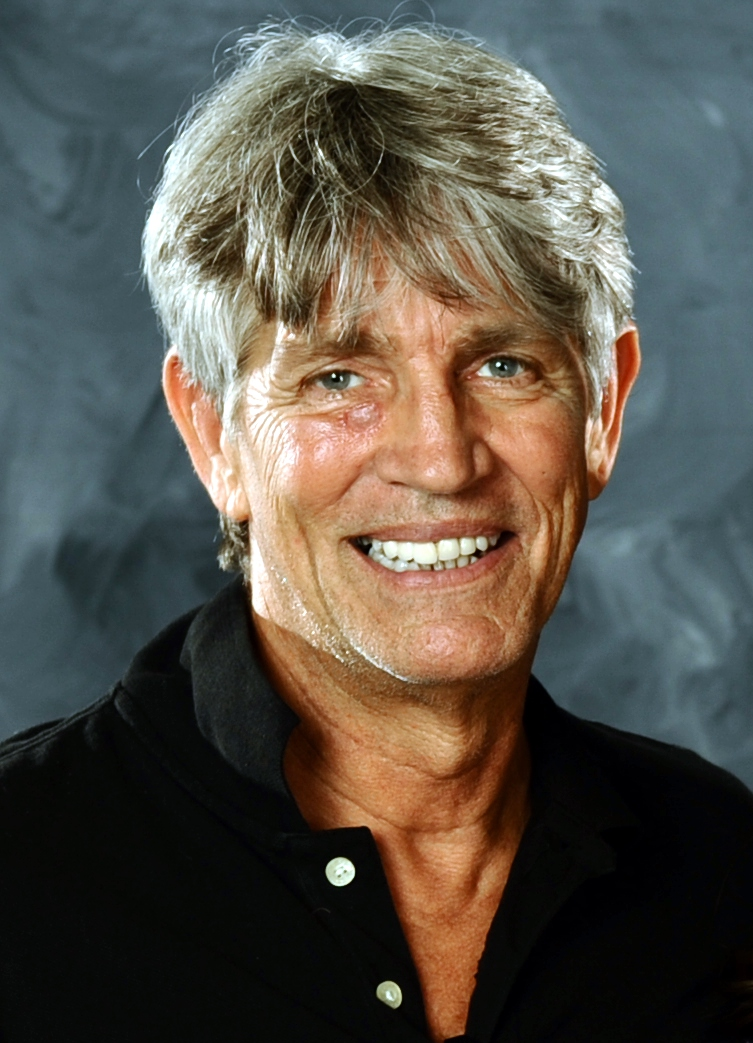
Roberts in 2015

In 2015, he appeared in season 5 of Lost Girl, a Canadian TV show on Showcase, as the main character, Bo's, father. In 2015 he appeared in the Rihanna video "Bitch Better Have My Money" and in Chris Cornell's video for "Nearly Forgot My Broken Heart".

=== 2016–2019 ===
The Nigerian comedy drama movie A Trip to Jamaica, starring Eric Roberts, Ayo Makun, Funke Akindele, Nse Ikpe Etim, and Dan Davies, had its worldwide premiere on September 25, 2016, in Lagos State. In November 2016, the film was reported to have grossed 168 million naira, breaking the previous record set by 30 Days in Atlanta. It also broke records for the first film to hit 35 million in first weekend, the first film to hit 62 million in its first week, the fastest film to gross 100 million (17 days) and the fastest film to gross 150 million (six weeks). It opened at the Odeon Cinemas in London in December 2016 and became the highest-grossing film that weekend in London while also becoming the highest per screen average film in the UK during its limited run. It won the Africa Entertainment Legends Award (AELA) for Best Cinema Film of 2016 and received four nominations at the 2017 Africa Magic Viewers Choice Awards, including categories for best actress in a comedy, best writer, best movie (West Africa) and best actor in a comedy. The award show was held in March 2017 in Lagos State. The same year, Roberts was featured in season 4 of the hit American TV show Brooklyn Nine-Nine; he portrayed the character of Jimmy Figgis. He played Robert Avery in Grey's Anatomy.

In 2017, he had a major role in the horror thriller film The Institute, alongside James Franco and Pamela Anderson.

In 2018, he appeared in the third series of UK Channel4 reality show Celebrity Island with Bear Grylls where he completed the 4 weeks on the island. The same year, he also featured in the video of Enrique Iglesias's latest track "El Baño" as a bartender. He had a role in the drama film Papa, alongside Robert Scott Wilson, Paul Sorvino, Daryl Hannah, Mischa Barton, Frankie Avalon, Ann-Margret, and Michael Madsen which received favorables reviews. In 2018, he acted in the movie Head Full of Honey which stars Matt Dillon.

In a 2018 Vanity Fair interview, Roberts traced his prolific filmography to when he stopped getting consistent offers from major film studios and started doing B movies. "I start making a bunch of B movies—bam bam bam bam bam bam—one after the other, and then suddenly two, three years have passed, and I made like 30 films in two, three years," Roberts recalled. He was executive producer for the film Beverly Hills Bandits, which he also acted in with Ron Jeremy and Natasha Alam.

In 2019, he starred in the crime thriller drama Night Walk, starring Mickey Rourke. He had a major role in the action movie The Reliant, alongside Kevin Sorbo. He also appears on the sci-fi movie The Immortal Wars: Resurgence. He acted in the crime/thriller 90 Feet from Home, including Dean Cain. He also played a supporting role in the family movie A Karate Christmas Miracle. Also in 2019, 23 years after initially playing the role, Roberts reprised his version of the Master in licensed audio dramas produced by Big Finish Productions. He made his debut in series 5 of the spinoff series, The Diary of River Song. Later that year, he appeared in the finale of Ravenous, once more working opposite Paul McGann's Eighth Doctor.

=== 2020–present ===
In 2020, he starred in several movies including Reboot Camp, Angels Fallen, The Unbreakable Sword, Deported, Collision Earth, Hayalet : 3 Yasam and Top Gunner. Furthermore, he starred in the DC Comics short movie Pamela & Ivy and appeared in the fan-made movie Gambit: Playing for Keeps.

In January 2021, Roberts played the Master in Masterful, an audio drama celebrating the 50th anniversary of the Master's debut. In March 2021, he appeared in his own spin-off series, Master! as well. The same year, he took part in the horror movie Escape to the Cove, appeared in the acclaimed short drama The Sleepless, guest starred again in season 17, episode 14 on the TV show Grey's Anatomy, acted in the comedy Peach Cobbler, starred in the TV movie Mommy's Deadly Con Artist. He was also involved in the drama movie After Masks, the horror film 616 Wilford Lane and the comedy Mr. Birthday. In 2022, he co-starred with Lana Wood in Dog Boy, and as a recurring character in the second season of the HBO series The Righteous Gemstones In 2023, he was a guest star at Season 2 South Wind: On the Edge (created by Miloš Avramović) together with Miloš Biković and William Baldwin.

In 2022, following the Russian invasion of Ukraine, Roberts announced his support for Ukraine. He says he was "one of the biggest stars" in Russia, however, he said, "I was canceled right away and couldn't work there. But we're so disappointed in Putin, I wouldn't want to go there anyway. But that was half my income, from working in Russia. So I go to other places now."

In September 2024, Roberts was announced as one of the celebrities competing on season 33 of Dancing with the Stars. He was partnered with Britt Stewart. Roberts's memoir, Runaway Train: or, The Story of My Life So Far, was published through St. Martin's Press on September 17, 2024. It was co-written with Vanity Fair contributor Sam Kashner.

== Personal life ==
=== Ancestry ===
On a 2023 episode of Finding Your Roots featuring his sister Julia, it was revealed that their biological paternal great-great-grandfather's surname was actually Mitchell, not Roberts. Eric Roberts is a distant cousin of fellow actor Edward Norton.

=== Relationships and family ===
A 1989 profile of actress Sandy Dennis in People says she had a live-in relationship with Roberts for five years in a seven-bedroom house she rented in Connecticut. The relationship began several years after her 1974 parting from boyfriend Gerry Mulligan, a jazz musician who had lived with Dennis in the same house (whose Connecticut location was identified as Westport or Wilton in different People magazine articles).

In 1981, some months after Roberts began living with Dennis, he was in a debilitating car accident near their home. His ordeal was described by People magazine years later as "a month-long hospital stay after a bad car accident in 1981." Leaving the Wilton house he lived in with Dennis, Roberts went for a Jeep ride with his girlfriend's German Shepherd. When the dog seemed to lean out too far, Roberts tried to get hold of him. He let go of the steering wheel, and the car ended up hitting a tree. He was in a coma for three days. Dennis, an animal lover who cared for many dogs and cats, was relieved to learn her German Shepherd was not injured in the accident. Roberts recovered and his live-in relationship with Dennis lasted a few more years. Author James Spada claimed that it came to an end because of his affair with actress Ellen Barkin, while Roberts cited Dennis's refusal to start an animal shelter for some 100 stray cats living in the couple's shared home as the reason for their split. In his 2024 autobiography Runaway Train, Roberts wrote that he had impregnated Dennis, but she got an abortion.

Roberts broke off engagements with Dennis and actress Dana Wheeler-Nicholson. He has a daughter, Emma, from a live-in relationship with Kelly Cunningham; Emma was born on February 10, 1991. She eventually became an actress as well, making her major-film debut at age 10 in the 2001 drama Blow. After Roberts's relationship with Cunningham, he married Eliza Garrett (daughter of screenwriters David Rayfiel and Lila Garrett) in 1992. His stepson, Keaton Simons, is a singer-songwriter, and his stepdaughter, Morgan Simons, is a chef. Roberts became a grandfather for the first time in December 2020 when Emma gave birth to her first child, a son named Rhodes, with actor Garrett Hedlund.

On January 12, 2001, Roberts visited The Howard Stern Radio Show with Garrett, during a segment called "The Gossip Game" with Mike Walker of the National Enquirer. He confirmed that he and his sister, Julia, had been estranged for several years. The source of the estrangement had been his past drug abuse and her siding with his ex-girlfriend over the custody of his daughter. In 2004, he told People magazine that he and his sister reconciled when he visited her in the hospital after she gave birth to twins.

=== Legal issues ===
In December 1987, Roberts was arrested after police found him banging on a woman's apartment door in Manhattan's Upper West Side. He was charged with criminal trespass, possession of cocaine and marijuana, and second-degree assault after he punched a police officer. In February 1988, he pleaded guilty to harassment and was sentenced to six months on probation. His possession and assault charges were dropped.

In February 1995, Roberts was arrested in Los Angeles for shoving his wife Eliza into a wall.

== Bibliography ==
- — (2024). Runaway Train: or, The Story of My Life So Far. co-written with Sam Kashner. New York: St. Martin's Press. ISBN 978-1-250-27532-5.
