= List of Muppet Babies (1984 TV series) episodes =

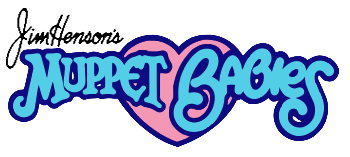

Muppet Babies (also known as Jim Henson's Muppet Babies) is an American animated television series, produced by Jim Henson Productions and Marvel Productions, that aired from September 15, 1984, to November 2, 1991, on CBS.

== Series overview ==
Season	Episodes	Originally released	
Season	Episodes	First released	Last released
1	13	September 15, 1984	December 8, 1984
2	13	September 14, 1985	December 7, 1985
3	16	September 13, 1986	December 27, 1986
4	18	September 19, 1987	January 16, 1988
5	13	September 10, 1988	December 3, 1988
6	18	September 16, 1989	January 13, 1990
7	8	September 15, 1990	November 3, 1990
8	8	September 14, 1991	November 2, 1991

== Episodes ==
=== Season 1 (1984) ===
No.	Title	Written by	Song	Original release date
1	"Noisy Neighbors"	Jeffrey Scott	"Sleep Rockin'"	September 15, 1984
The babies struggle to keep Animal quiet so as not to awaken their neighbor, a police officer who works the night shift.
2	"Dental Hyjinks"	Jeffrey Scott	"Loose Tooth Boogie"	September 22, 1984
The babies try to pull out Fozzie's loose tooth, so he won't have to go to the dentist.
3	"Who's Afraid of the Big Bad Dark?"	Jeffrey Scott	"Good Things Happen in the Dark"	September 29, 1984
After watching a monster movie a very frightened Baby Beaker and a very tired Baby Bunsen come to seek comfort in the nursery. The babies try to cure Beaker of his fear of the dark. The last thing any of the babies expect is to be chased by the dreaded slime monster. Guest characters: Bunsen and Beaker
4	"Raiders of the Lost Muppet"	Jeffrey Scott	"Best Friends"	October 6, 1984
While playing hide and seek, Animal vanishes, and the babies search the house for him.
5	"Scooter's Hidden Talent"	Jeffrey Scott	"Dream for Your Inspiration"	October 13, 1984
The other babies all have special talents, but Scooter can't figure out his. Guest characters: Bunsen and Beaker
6	"The Case of the Missing Chicken"	Jeffrey Scott	"Camilla"	October 20, 1984
Gonzo panics when he can't find his stuffed chicken Camilla and he thinks she has gone missing. Fozzie is the prime suspect. Guest characters: Bunsen and Beaker (fantasy sequence only)
7	"Eight Take-Away One Equals Panic"	Jeffrey Scott	"Table for One"	October 27, 1984
Panic ensues in the nursery when the babies overhear Nanny saying she needs to get rid of one of them.
8	"What Do You Want to Be When You Grow Up?"	Jeffrey Scott	"It's Up to You"	November 3, 1984
Kermit struggles with deciding what he wants to be when he grows up.
9	"Close Encounters of the Frog Kind"	Jeffrey Scott	"Practice Makes Perfect"	November 10, 1984
Kermit's little nephew, Robin, comes to visit and escapes his bowl. Guest characters: Bunsen with Beaker (fantasy sequence only), and Robin
10	"Gonzo's Video Show"	Jeffrey Scott	"I Can't Help Being a Star"	November 17, 1984
After Nanny lends them a video camera, the babies try to make their own movies, ultimately deciding to make their own version of Star Wars. Note: The episode was shown as a primetime special on December 18, 1984. The broadcast received a 9.9 Nielsen rating with a share of 15%.
11	"Fun Park Fantasies"	Jeffrey Scott	"Merry Go Round"	November 24, 1984
The babies try to sleep while imagining what the amusement park they'll be visiting the next day will be like.
12	"From a Galaxy Far, Far Away"	Jeffrey Scott	"Rocket to the Stars"	December 1, 1984
The babies conclude the creature that climbed into the nursery is an alien and try to return her to Neptune.
13	"Good Clean Fun"	Jeffrey Scott	"Keep Your Animal Clean"	December 8, 1984
After breaking a lamp, the babies try to make it up to Nanny, but create more messes in the process. Guest characters: Bunsen and Beaker

=== Season 2 (1985) ===
No.	Title	Written by	Song	Original release date
14	"Once Upon an Egg Timer"	Jeffrey Scott	"Show Us the Real You"	September 14, 1985
When Rowlf loses his voice, the others take turns telling stories of searching for it. Guest characters: Bunsen and Beaker
15	"Piggy's Hyper-Activity Book"	Jeffrey Scott	"Music is Everywhere"	September 21, 1985
The babies amuse themselves by working their way through an activity book.
16	"Fozzie's Last Laugh"	Jeffrey Scott	"Wocka Wocka Wocka!"	September 28, 1985
Fozzie considers giving up comedy.
17	"The Great Cookie Robbery"	Jeffrey Scott	"Trackin'"	October 5, 1985
While Gonzo secretly munches away at a box of cookies, the other babies tell stories to keep their minds off their growling stomachs.
18	"Out-of-This-World History"	Jeffrey Scott	"Yankee Doodle Rock"	October 12, 1985
The babies wander their way through history with the assistance of one of Nanny's books.
19	"Snow White and the Seven Muppets"	Jeffrey Scott	"Snow White Blues" & "America the Beautiful"	October 19, 1985
The babies put on their own version of Snow White but Piggy is frustrated when she doesn't gets lead role. Guest characters: Bunsen and Beaker
20	"I Want My Muppet TV!"	Jeffrey Scott	"TV Maniacs"	October 26, 1985
When the TV breaks, the babies make their own programs. Guest characters: Bunsen and Beaker
21	"Musical Muppets"	Jeffrey Scott	Various bits by each Muppet including "The Weirdo Troll", "On the Range" & "How to Tell a Chicken Joke"	November 2, 1985
Rowlf enters a song writing contest which inspires everyone to try out song writing. Guest characters: Bunsen and Beaker.
22	"What's New at the Zoo?"	Jeffrey Scott	"Animals Are My Favorite People"	November 9, 1985
The babies tell Rowlf the positive things about zoos, worrying Gonzo about being thrown in the zoo, when he realizes that there is no way of telling what kind of animal he is.
23	"The Great Muppet Cartoon Show"	Jeffrey Scott	"We Love Cartoons"	November 16, 1985
The babies make their own cartoon shows. Note: Among the antics, Piggy draws up a parody of Pinocchio & Gonzo turns into a clay figure similar to Gumby
24	"The Muppet Museum of Art"	Jeffrey Scott	"Art is for Your Heart"	November 23, 1985
Nobody can go to the art museum because Skeeter sprains her ankle, So the babies create their own art museum in the nursery for her.
25	"By the Book"	Barry O'Brien & Bob Smith	"Someone's Gonna Fix It"	November 30, 1985
The babies take turns narrating stories from their favorite books.
26	"When You Wish Upon a Muppet"	Chuck Lorre	"Wishes Have a Way"	December 7, 1985
The babies imagine their fondest wishes coming true. Note 1: The film clip shown after Muppet wish is from The Great Muppet Caper. Strangely, many of the muppets who appeared in Muppet Babies, aren't in that scene. Note 2: This is the last episode to feature Howie Mandel as the voices of Skeeter and Animal.

=== Season 3 (1986) ===
No.	Title	Written by	Song	Original release date
27	"Pigerella"	Jeffrey Scott	"Check Me Out"	September 13, 1986
Piggy takes the blame and punishment for Scooter and Skeeter's mess, leaving her to imagine herself as Cinderella. Note: Starting from this episode, Dave Coulier takes over the role of Animal, and Frank Welker takes over the role of Skeeter.
28	"The Best Friend I Never Had"	Jeffrey Scott	"Nobody's Perfect"	September 20, 1986
With the aid of Scooter's computer, the babies try to create their perfect friends.
29	"The Weirdo Zone"	Jeffrey Scott	"Semi-Weirdo"	September 27, 1986
The babies try to get in touch with their inner weirdness in order to understand Gonzo.
30	"Muppets in Toyland"	Jeffrey Scott	"I Never Get Tired of Toys"	October 4, 1986
Scooter's new robot seems like the best toy ever, until it starts taking hostages.
31	"The Muppet Broadcasting Company"	Jeffrey Scott	"Let's Hear It for Your Ears"	October 11, 1986
When the power goes out, the babies make their own radio programs. Guest characters: Bunsen and Beaker.
32	"Kermit Goes to Washington"	Jeffrey Scott	"Jailbirds"	October 18, 1986
Nanny instructs the babies to create a set of rules for the nursery which leads them to experiment with various forms of government.
33	"Fozzie's Family Tree"	Jeffrey Scott	"Amadogus"	October 25, 1986
The babies take a look at their ancestors to learn more about who they are.
34	"The Daily Muppet"	Jeffrey Scott	"The Daily Muppet"	November 1, 1986
After Nanny's newspaper is ruined by the rain, the babies make their own for her. Guest character: Bunsen and Beaker
35	"Scooter's Uncommon Cold"	Jeffrey Scott	"Get Well Soon"	November 8, 1986
When Scooter gets sick, the babies imagine going inside him to aide his body in fighting the germs. Guest character: Bunsen and Beaker
36	"Treasure Attic"	Jeffrey Scott	"Pirates"	November 15, 1986
The babies set out on an expedition to the attic to recover Nanny's missing treasure. Note: This is the only episode where none of the Babies sing. The song is sung by the Pirettes.
37	"Around the Nursery in 80 Days"	Jeffrey Scott	"Flyin' Away"	November 22, 1986
To convince Nanny not to go on vacation, the babies build the world's biggest attractions in the nursery.
38	"Fine Feathered Enemies"	Jeffrey Scott	"Remember to Love"	November 29, 1986
Polly the talkative parrot that Nanny leaves in the nursery causes fights to erupt between the babies.
39	"Muppet Goose"	Jeffrey Scott	"Make a Nursery Rhyme"	December 6, 1986
Nanny tries to get the babies to sleep by telling them nursery rhymes.
40	"Bad Luck Bear"	Jeffrey Scott	"Good Luck"	December 13, 1986
Fozzie breaks a mirror and struggles to get rid of his bad luck.
41	"Of Mice and Muppets"	Sindy McKay & Larry Swerdlove	"Playin' in the City"	December 20, 1986
Kermit and Rowlf spend a long night trying to recapture PeeWee, Officer Caruthers's pet mouse after Rowlf accidentally lets him out of his cage.
42	"Back to the Nursery"	Star Kaplan & Maia Mattise	"Runnin' Out of Time"	December 27, 1986
After Fozzie ruins one of Nanny's photos, the babies pretend to travel back in time to take a new one.

=== Season 4 (1987–88) ===
No.	Title	Written by	Song	Original release date
43	"Muppetland"	Sindy McKay & Larry Swerdlove	"Imagination Land"	September 19, 1987
The babies are invited to Bunsen's birthday party at a theme park, and while waiting for the actual event, they pretend to build a theme park with each baby creating their own land.
44	"Water Babies"	Barbara Beck & Stephen Robertson	"There's a Fish That Looks a Lot Like Me"	September 26, 1987
After playing mine tunnel, the babies explore the ocean with the help of a fish tank.
45	"The Incredible Shrinking Weirdo"	Sindy McKay & Larry Swerdlove	"Being Small Isn't Bad at All"	October 3, 1987
Gonzo is convinced he is getting smaller. Note: This episode features a scene from The Muppet Show, where a live-action Kermit interacts with an animated Gonzo.
46	"Where No Muppet Has Gone Before"	Kathy Selbert	"Guiding Star"	October 10, 1987
Bunsen and Beaker come over for a sleepover and teach the babies about outer space. The babies then have fantasies about being in space, once again. Guest characters: Bunsen and Beaker
47	"Journey to the Center of the Nursery"	Sindy McKay & Larry Swerdlove	"Underground"	October 17, 1987
When Fozzie drops his skate key down the vent, the babies travel to the centre of earth to find it. Note: This is the last episode animated by Toei Animation.
48	"This Little Piggy Went to Hollywood"	Sindy McKay & Larry Swerdlove	"The Biggest Little Pig"	October 24, 1987
Once again, Piggy dreams about her future as a Hollywood star. Note: This is the first episode animated by AKOM instead of Toei Animation.
49	"My Muppet Valentine"	Star Kaplan & Maia Mattise	"You're Special to Me"	October 31, 1987
When Nanny forgets Rowlf's valentine cookie, the others' attempts to cheer him up but just seem to make Rowlf feel worse.
50	"Invasion of the Muppet Snackers"	Sindy McKay & Larry Swerdlove	"Give Food a Chance"	November 7, 1987
The babies worry how they'll eat the foul thing Nanny is working on in the kitchen.
51	"Twinkle Toe Muppets"	Sindy McKay & Larry Swerdlove	N/A	November 14, 1987
The babies try to teach Scooter to dance while Piggy and Skeeter argue over whether dancing for Scooter should be beautiful or fun.
52	"Weirdo for the Prosecution"	Sindy McKay & Larry Swerdlove	N/A	November 21, 1987
Gonzo is put on trial after Skeeter accuses him of breaking the cookie jar.
53	"Muppet Island"	Rich Fogel & Mark Seidenberg	N/A	November 28, 1987
While Nanny cleans the hall carpet, the babies are trapped in the nursery, leading them to imagine themselves on a deserted island.
54	"The Frog Who Knew Too Much"	Rich Fogel & Mark Seidenberg	N/A	December 5, 1987
Kermit struggles not to reveal Nanny's secret to the others.
55	"Beach Blanket Babies"	Sindy McKay & Larry Swerdlove	"He's the Most"	December 12, 1987
The babies help Fozzie in overcoming his fear of water.
56	"Old MacKermit Had a Farm"	Rich Fogel & Mark Seidenberg	N/A	December 19, 1987
The babies try to figure out where muffins come from. Guest characters: Bunsen and Beaker
57	"Adventures in Muppet-Sitting"	Star Kaplan & Maia Mattise	N/A	December 26, 1987
The babies try to keep Robin and Animal safe and out of trouble. Note: Final appearance of Robin Guest characters: Robin
58	"The House That Muppets Built"	Ken Koonce & David Wiemers	N/A	January 2, 1988
When Piggy's dollhouse is destroyed, she searches for a new one. Note: A clip from The $25,000 Pyramid is featured, along with a voice cameo from host Dick Clark.
59	"Masquerading Muppets"	Rich Fogel & Mark Seidenberg	"Costume Party"	January 9, 1988
The babies prepare for a costume ball but Piggy and Skeeter argue over the queen costume.
60	"Nanny's Day Off"	Hank Saroyan & Jeffrey Scott	"Riding the Wagon Trail"	January 16, 1988
The babies declare it Nanny's Day and give her the day off while they take over the cooking and cleaning, and the most important job of finishing her big surprise.

=== Season 5 (1988) ===
No.	Title	Written by	Song	Original release date
61	"Muppets Not Included"	Sindy McKay & Larry Swerdlove	"Gizmo"	September 10, 1988
The babies find a strange object belonging to Nanny and try to figure out what it is. Note: Dr. Teeth makes a cameo in the "Celebrity Circles" sequence.
62	"Beauty and the Schnoz"	Sindy McKay & Larry Swerdlove	"Look a Little Bit Closer"	September 17, 1988
Gonzo tries to make himself attractive in Piggy's eyes.
63	"The Pig Who Would Be Queen"	Hank Saroyan	N/A	September 24, 1988
The babies create a picture box fairy tale with Piggy as the heroine.
64	"Is There a Muppet in the House?"	Sindy McKay & Larry Swerdlove	"No One Believes in Ghosts"	October 1, 1988
Rowlf's description of a scary movie he watched makes everyone toss and turn during a stormy naptime. Things gets worse when some of the babies start vanishing, and they believe that Animal had found a secret passage.
65	"Slipping Beauty"	Lois Becker & Mark Stratton	"We Miss You"	October 8, 1988
The babies tell the story of Sleeping Beauty to Piggy over a walkie-talkie after she gets the chickenpox.
66	"Muppet Baby Boom"	Sindy McKay & Larry Swerdlove	"B-A-B-Y Baby"	October 15, 1988
The babies prepare to look after the neighbor's "Baby".
67	"Scooter by Any Other Name"	J.R. Young	"Look at Me Now"	October 22, 1988
With Gonzo's assistance, Scooter experiments with different personalities. Guest character: Beaker (cameo in music sequence)
68	"He's a Wonderful Frog"	Sindy McKay & Larry Swerdlove	"He's My Hero"	October 29, 1988
The babies try to convince Kermit not to leave forever while he prepares to visit Robin.
69	"Elm Street Babies"	Tony Marino	"Sandman"	November 5, 1988
The babies reveal the strange dreams they're having, all of which feed into each other's dreams.
70	"Plan 8 from Outer Space"	Lois Becker & Mark Stratton	"That's What Nannies Do"	November 12, 1988
Convinced that space aliens are abducting nannies, the babies set out to rescue the nannies, and ensure theirs isn't the next one to vanish.
71	"Junkyard Muppets"	Sindy McKay & Larry Swerdlove	"We Want Your Stuff"	November 19, 1988
A mess in the nursery leaves Fozzie and Piggy searching for their missing possessions, while Gonzo discovers the cave of the closet trolls.
72	"The Air Conditioner at the End of the Galaxy"	Lois Becker & Mark Stratton	"Keep Your Cool"	November 26, 1988
After the air conditioner breaks, the babies imagine themselves in the jungle while searching for a cool spot.
73	"Bug-Busting Babies"	Hank Saroyan	"Bugbusters"	December 3, 1988
Gonzo leads a team into Scooter's Computer to catch the bug messing up his program.

=== Season 6 (1989–90) ===
No.	Title	Written by	Song	Original release date
74	"This Old Nursery"	J.R. Young	"Caveman Ways"	September 16, 1989
The babies find a time capsule in the wall and imagine what the people who used to live in the nursery might have been like.
75	"And Now a Word from Our Muppets"	Sindy McKay & Larry Swerdlove	"Come See Nanny"	September 23, 1989
When Nanny has a garage sale, the babies create advertisements to sell her products.
76	"Six-to-Eight Weeks"	Sindy McKay & Larry Swerdlove	"We've Been Waiting for You"	September 30, 1989
The babies imagine what their new playhouse will be like, while waiting for it to arrive in the mail.
77	"The Green Ranger"	Mark Stratton and Lois Becker	"Green Ranger"	October 7, 1989
Kermit wonders what it takes to be a hero after his favorite cowboy show is cancelled.
78	"Not Necessarily the Babies"	J.R. Young	"You Can't Stop the News"	October 14, 1989
The babies learn why grown-ups watch the news.
79	"Comic Capers"	Sindy McKay & Larry Swerdlove	"We Love the Funnies"	October 21, 1989
The babies amuse themselves by wandering the comic section of the Sunday paper. Note: Guest appearance by Stan Lee.
80	"Faster Than a Speeding Weirdo"	Hank Saroyan	"I'll Be Blue for You"	October 28, 1989
Gonzo's careless daredevil stunt causes his stuffed chick Camilla to get severely damaged.
81	"Skeeter and the Wolf"	Hank Saroyan & Jeffrey Scott	"Peter and the Wolf"	November 4, 1989
Skeeter leads a team into the attic to search for Nanny's record.
82	"Romancing the Weirdo"	Jeffrey Scott	"It's Fun to Write"	November 11, 1989
Gonzo finds a typewriter and creates a detective/adventure story.
83	"The New Adventures of Kermo Polo"	Mark Stratton and Lois Becker	"Right Stuff"	November 18, 1989
Nanny tells the babies about the great explorers in history, leading to Kermit imagining himself as "Kermo Polo".
84	"Goosetown Babies"	Hank Saroyan	"Goosetown"	November 25, 1989
Gonzo and Animal search the Mother Goose rhymes to see what's wrong with them. Note: Last episode to feature the 1986–1989 music in the title card.
85	"It's Only Pretendo"	Sindy McKay & Larry Swerdlove	"The Great Unbeatable Me"	December 2, 1989
Piggy and Gonzo go a little crazy competing for high scores in a video game. Note 1: Some of the footage is taken from the video game Fantasy Zone Note 2: First episode since "Dental Hyjinks" to use different music for the title card, and the music is now composed by Robert Irving and Hank Saroyan.
86	"Quoth the Weirdo"	Sindy McKay & Larry Swerdlove	"Making a Rhyme"	December 9, 1989
The babies share their favorite poems with their new friend, Bean. Guest character: Bean Bunny
87	"Operators Are Standing by"	Hank Saroyan & J.R. Young	"It's the Bees"	December 16, 1989
Animal hangs the phone up on someone, and the others wonder who it was. Guest characters Statler and Waldorf
88	"Babes in Troyland"	Mark Stratton and Lois Becker	"Monster of My Dreams"	December 23, 1989
Scooter teaches the others about Greek mythology. Note: The live action clip of a monster is from the X-rated film Flesh Gordon.
89	"Puss N' Boots N' Babies"	Hank Saroyan & J.R. Young	"Don't You Wish You Were a Kitty Cat?"	December 30, 1989
The babies and Nanny babysit Officer Caruther's pet cat, giving the babies a chance to learn about kittens. Note: Unlike most live-action sequences, a real cat was pasted into the animated world. Guest character: Bean Bunny
90	"The Muppet of Invention"	Sindy McKay & Larry Swerdlove	"Nose for the Future"	January 6, 1990
Statler and Waldorf encourage the babies to make inventions of their own. Guest characters: Statler and Waldorf
91	"A Punch Line to the Tummy"	Jeffrey Scott	"Words Can Hurt"	January 13, 1990
Fozzie tries to record his jokes to hear if they're funny or not, but all he hears is the others insulting him. Note: Guest appearances by John Ritter, Whoopi Goldberg, and Dave Coulier.

=== Season 7 (1990) ===
No.	Title	Written by	Song	Original release date
92	"Muppet Babies: The Next Generation"	Sindy McKay & Larry Swerdlove	"The Future is Counting on You" "Theodore Space Gal" (Jetsons Parody)	September 15, 1990
The babies try to imagine what the future will be like, and end up performing parodies of multiple space programs. Note: The Jetsons Intro Guest character: Bean Bunny
93	"Buckskin Babies"	Hank Saroyan & J.R. Young	"Pecos Weirdo", "We're Pals"	September 22, 1990
The babies imagine themselves as folk heroes of the old west. Guest character: Bean Bunny (fantasy sequence only)
94	"Sing a Song of Superheroes"	Hank Saroyan & J.R. Young	Various parodies of opera numbers.	September 29, 1990
Nanny's water is shut off and the babies go in search of it while performing superhero operatic numbers in exaggerated garb. Note: Last episode of the show to be aired in syndication. Guest character: Bean Bunny
95	"Gonzee's Playhouse Channel"	Sindy McKay & Larry Swerdlove	"Na Na Numbers"	October 6, 1990
The babies start their own TV Channel Note: Among the parodies is a parody of Sesame Street. Guest character: Bean Bunny
96	"Kermit Pan"	Hank Saroyan & J.R. Young	"Animal Gator"	October 13, 1990
The babies recreate a whacked-out approximate version of Peter Pan for Bean Bunny's benefit. Guest character: Bean Bunny
97	"Whose Tale Is It, Anyway?"	Sindy McKay & Larry Swerdlove	"I'm Only One Bunny"	October 20, 1990
Piggy becomes jealous of Bean's friend Janice, who is able to read before all the other tots, causing a fight over who will play the role of Mother Rabbit when Janice announces she will read "Peter Rabbit". Note: First and only appearance in the show of Janice. Guest characters: Bean Bunny and Janice
98	"...At the Movies"	Hank Saroyan & J.R. Young	N/A	October 27, 1990
After Uncle Statler and Waldorf announce they will open their own movie theater, the Muppet Babies imagine jumping into their favorite movies. Note: Johnny 5 from Short Circuit helps Scooter find a movie that fits him. Guest characters: Statler and Waldorf, plus Bean Bunny
99	"In Search of the Bronzed Beetle"	Hank Saroyan & J.R. Young	"Faraway Places Are Calling Me"	November 3, 1990
When Uncle Statler and Waldorf's old trunk arrives a beetle brooch goes missing, so the Babies go on a fantasy search for it. Guest characters: Statler and Waldorf, plus Bean Bunny

=== Season 8 (1991) ===
No.	Title	Written by	Song	Original release date
100	"The Transcontinental Whoo-Whoo"	Hank Saroyan & J.R. Young	"Simon Says"	September 14, 1991
The babies build a transcontinental railroad across the nursery and more. Guest characters: Statler and Waldorf, plus Bean Bunny
101	"Get Me to the Perch on Time"	Hank Saroyan & J.R. Young	"Lou"	September 21, 1991
An injured carrier pigeon recuperates in the nursery while the babies travel the world delivering the mail. Note: Last appearance of Bean Bunny. Guest character: Bean Bunny
102	"Bearly Alone Babies"	Hank Saroyan & J.R. Young	"We're Not Scared"	September 28, 1991
While Nanny locks up in anticipation of a storm, Fozzie sets traps for a burglar. Guest characters: Statler and Waldorf
103	"Remote Control Cornballs"	Hank Saroyan & J.R. Young	"What's Bugging You?"	October 5, 1991
Bunsen and Beaker bring over their TV transducter and accidentally mix up everyone's favorite shows. Note: Final appearances of Bunsen and Beaker. Guest characters: Bunsen and Beaker.
104	"Nice to Have Gnome You"	Hank Saroyan & J.R. Young	"Just Read a Book"	October 12, 1991
Piggy searches the labyrinth for her missing library book. Note: Featuring clips from Labyrinth and The Witches.
105	"Happy Birthday, Uncle Piggy"	Lois Becker & Mark Stratton	"It's Hard to Be As Wonderful As Me"	October 19, 1991
The babies try to create a perfect surprise party for Uncle Statler. Guest characters: Statler and Waldorf
106	"Hats!, Hats!, Hats!"	Sindy McKay	"Under a Hat"	October 26, 1991
Statler and Waldorf bring hats to the Nursery. Note: Last appearances of Statler and Waldorf. Guest characters: Statler and Waldorf
107	"Eight Flags Over the Nursery"	Hank Saroyan & J.R. Young	"Baby Land"	November 2, 1991
A new amusement park will open in five years, and, when deciding not to wait that long, the babies imagine their own wacky amusement park. Note: Featuring clips from Little Muppet Monsters.
