= Lady Gaga and the Muppets Holiday Spectacular =

2013 American television special

- Title card
- Directed by: Gregg Gelfand
- Presented by: Tom Kane
- Starring: Lady Gaga; The Muppets
- Country of origin: United States
- Original language: English

Production
- Executive producer: Salli Frattini
- Producer: Eric Conte
- Running time: 90 minutes
- Production companies: Lincoln Square Productions; The Muppets Studio

Original release
- Network: ABC
- Release: November 28, 2013

Lady Gaga and the Muppets Holiday Spectacular is a Thanksgiving television special with American singer Lady Gaga and the Muppets. The 90-minute program aired on ABC on November 28, 2013, with guest stars Joseph Gordon-Levitt, Elton John and RuPaul and an appearance by Kristen Bell. It was the second Gaga Thanksgiving special on ABC, after A Very Gaga Thanksgiving in 2011. The singer had previously collaborated with the Muppets on media appearances and in her shows.

The special featured songs from Gaga's third studio album, Artpop, and duets with the guest stars. Critics gave the special mixed reviews, with some praising Gaga for being relatable in the show. Other reviewers were disappointed with its lack of production ideas, other than as a promotion for Artpop. It had lower ratings than other Thanksgiving specials, with a total of 3.62 million viewers and a 0.9 rating in the adult age 18–49 demographic.

== Synopsis ==
Announcer Tom Kane explains to Pepe the King Prawn that the special is being filmed for Lady Gaga, the latter then appears and explains why she invited the Muppets and then performs "Venus". After Statler and Waldorf's review of the performance, Kristen Bell asks for Gaga's autograph. This annoys Miss Piggy who was planning her own finale and enlists the Muppets to hold auditions. Gaga performs "Applause", followed by "Bennie and the Jets" and "Artpop" with Elton John (with the Muppets joining them for the latter). After discussing ideas for the finale, Gaga performs "Manicure" and the Muppets talk about the most inappropriate gifts they ever received. Kermit the Frog joins Gaga in a duet of "Gypsy", and Joseph Gordon-Levitt duets on "Baby, It's Cold Outside". Kermit's friendship with Gaga angers Miss Piggy; after a performance of "Fashion!" by Gaga and RuPaul, Piggy bemoans the attention paid to the singer. Although she dreams of singing "Santa Baby", she is upstaged in her dream by Youthful Praise. After a trailer for the upcoming Muppets Most Wanted, Gaga asks Piggy to suggest a finale and reprises "Applause" with the Muppets.

== Production ==
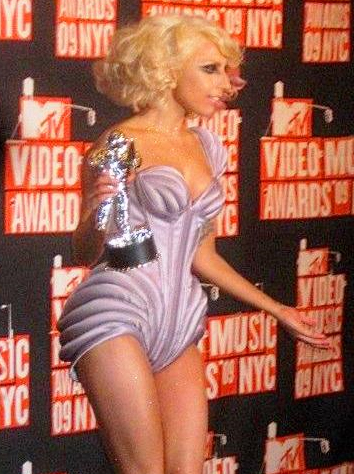
Lady Gaga at the 2009 MTV Video Music Awards, where Kermit the Frog was her date

In October 2013, the American Broadcasting Company (ABC) announced a 90-minute special entitled Lady Gaga and the Muppets' Holiday Spectacular. It was the second Thanksgiving television special on ABC by Gaga, after A Very Gaga Thanksgiving in 2011. The singer collaborated with the Muppets for the special, which aired on November 28, 2013. "I was so excited when ABC called me about doing a holiday special this year. I knew it just wouldn't be a complete night of laughter and memories without the Muppets! Can't wait to see the gang again, and I hope Miss Piggy's still not mad about Kermit ... We're just friends," Gaga said about the special. Guest stars included Joseph Gordon-Levitt, Elton John and RuPaul, with an appearance by Kristen Bell. Gaga performed several songs from her third studio album, Artpop. The singer had collaborated twice with the Muppets in the past; in 2009 Kermit the Frog was her date at the 2009 MTV Video Music Awards, and she featured Jim Henson's Creature Shop pieces on the Monster Ball Tour (2009–2011).

The special was described in press releases as "an avant-garde twist on the classic holiday variety show as Lady Gaga goes backstage with the Muppets, making a performance dream come true for the multi-platinum singer-songwriter when they combine forces to sing holiday favorites and Lady Gaga hits". It was confirmed that holiday classics like "Deck the Halls" and "Jingle Bells" would be performed by the Muppets, as well as songs from Artpop. A promotional tie-in with the special was the trailer for Muppets Most Wanted, in which Gaga made a cameo appearance. Kory Grow of Rolling Stone called the special a "fitting move" for the singer, since she was releasing Artpop and the Muppets frequently collaborated with celebrities.

The special was acquired by Channel 5 in the United Kingdom, with Dayna Donaldson of the network describing it as "a high energy and truly unique musical show full of fun". After its broadcast, it was obtained by Netflix Canada for 13 months of streaming. Previews of the show, uploaded on Gaga's Instagram account, showed the singer performing "Applause" and planning a party for the special's finale.

== Reception ==
=== Ratings ===
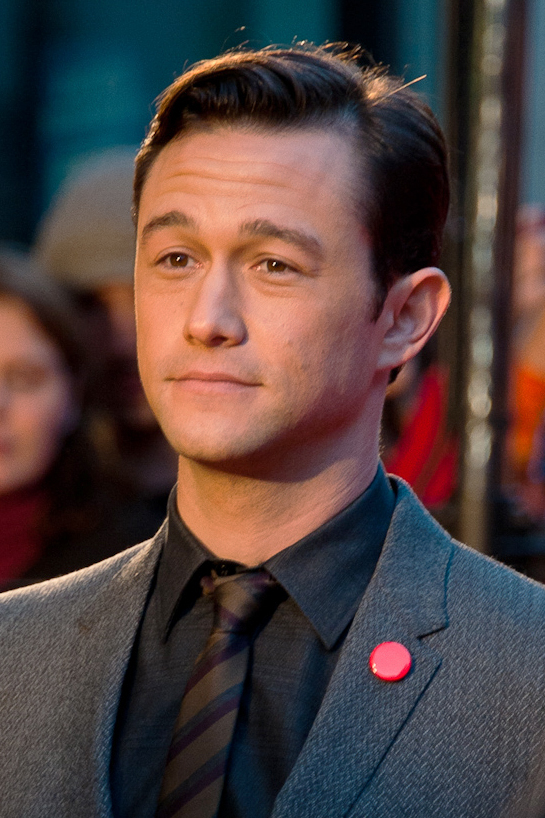
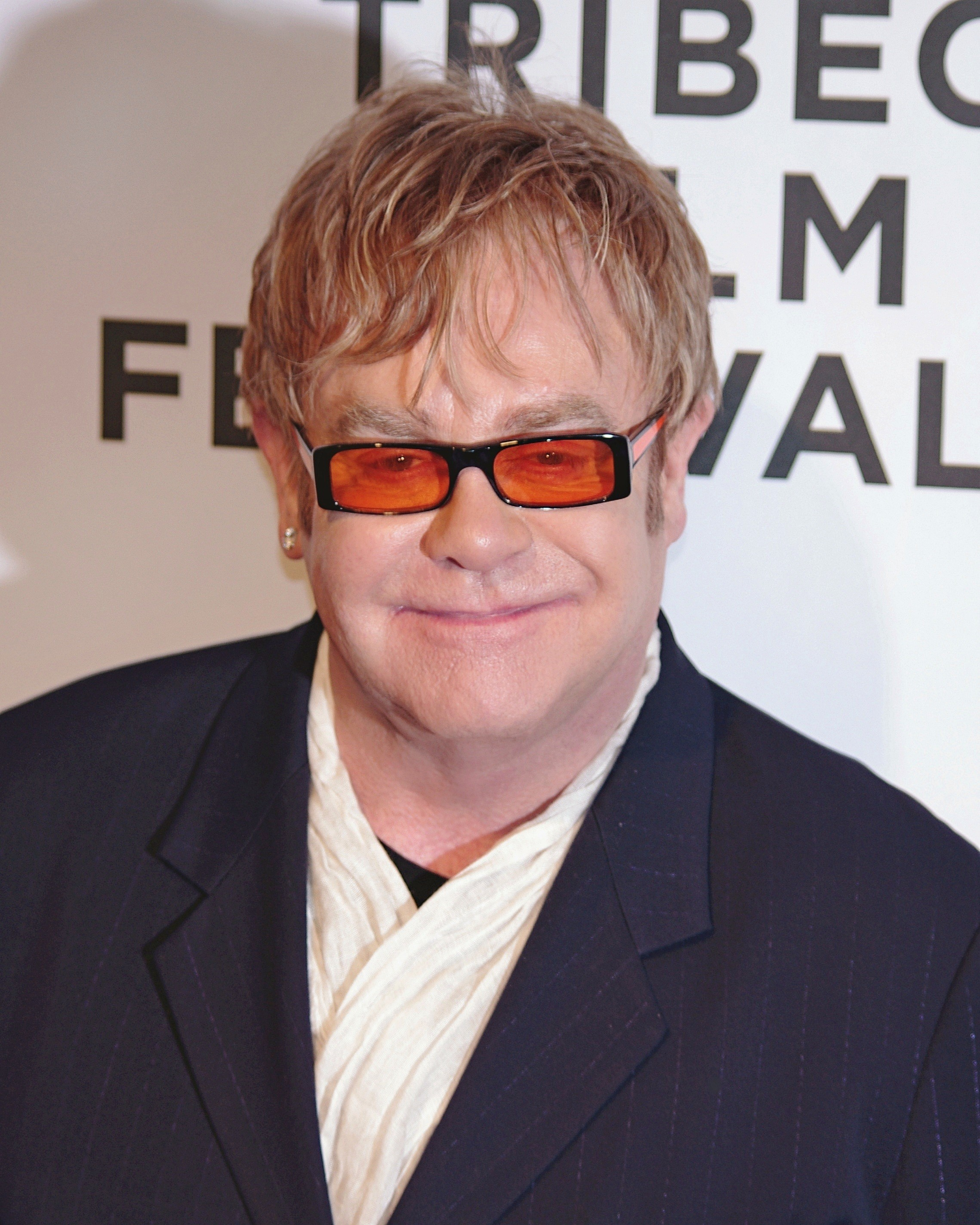
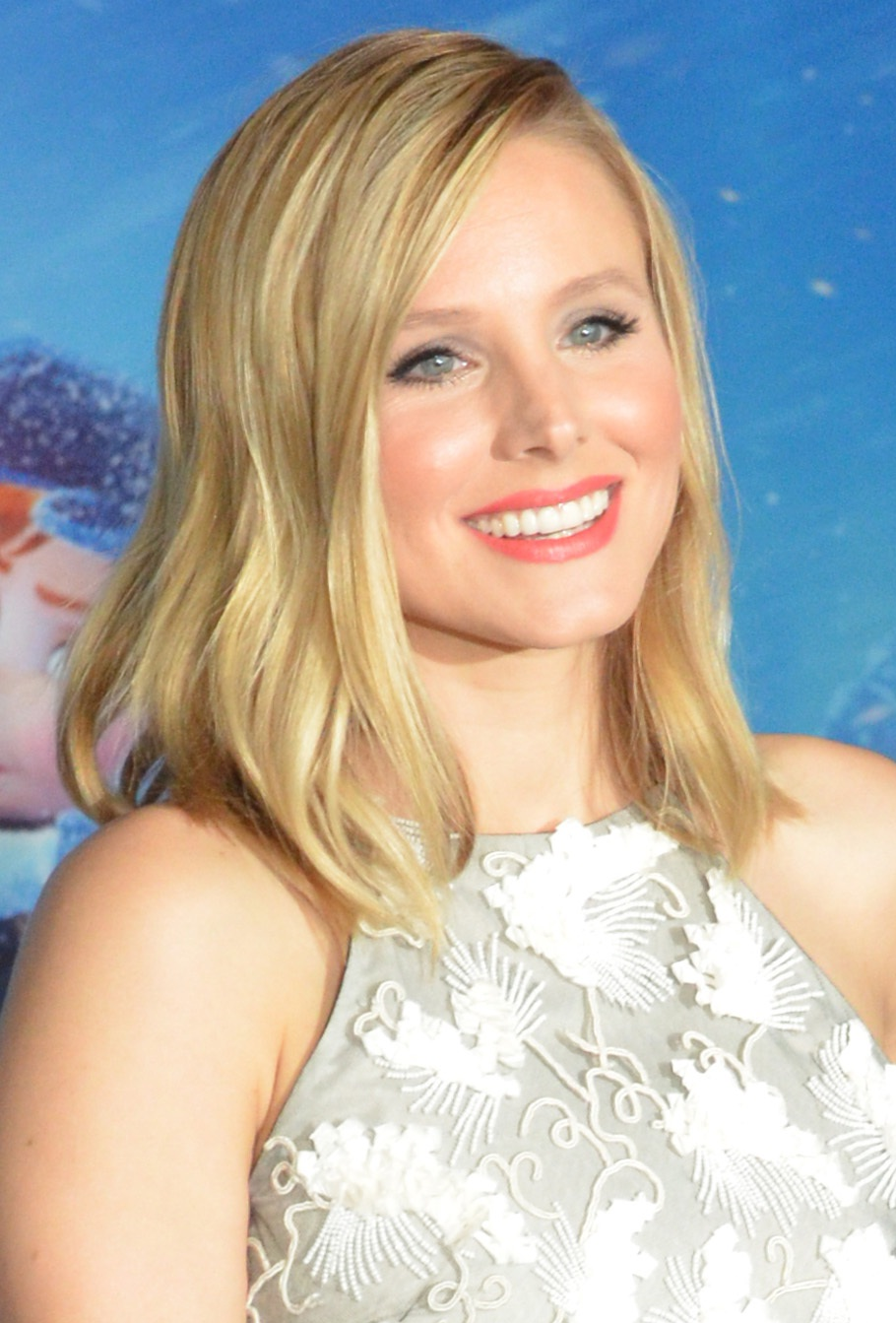
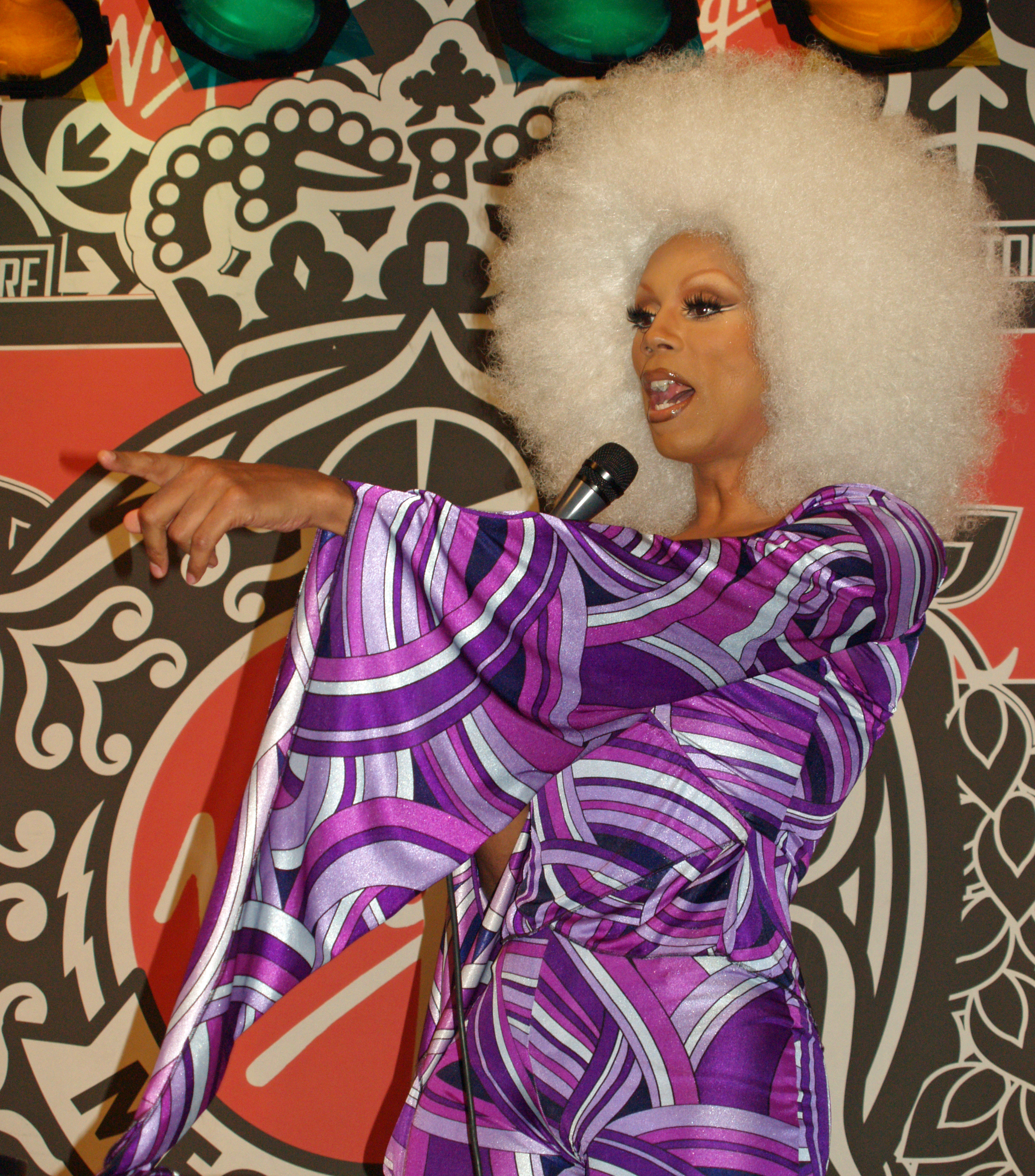
Special guests included (clockwise) Joseph Gordon-Levitt, Elton John, RuPaul, and Kristen Bell.

The special had 3.62 million viewers and a 0.9 rating in the adult age 18-49 demographic. Its rating was lower than A Very Gaga Thanksgiving, which had a 1.6 rating in the same demographic and 5.4 million viewers. The total rating was the same as Glee, which was concurrently broadcast on Fox. It was down by 25% than the 2012 Thanksgiving special, Bad 25. The rating was adjusted to 1.0 by Nielsen ratings. In comparison, ABC's annual telecast of A Charlie Brown Thanksgiving before Gaga's special was watched by 5.4 million viewers and had a 1.6 rating in the 18–49 demographic.

=== Critical response ===
According to Marissa G. Muller of Rolling Stone, Gaga "was at her most accessible during the show, sharing the difficulties of life on the road and her love of the holidays – specifically, how she grew up watching the Muppets and has had a long love for Kermit. The whole affair was relatively conservative for Gaga and weirdly progressive for the Muppets". Muller wrote that the special was aired at an opportune moment for Gaga, since Artpop's sales had dropped 82 percent in its second week and the show was hoped to woo back her audience. She called the opening performance of "Venus" one of its top moments. Mark Graham wrote for VH1 that Gaga had a lack of relatability at that point in her career: "To her credit, [she] seems to have recognized this flaw in her brand strategy and has been working overtime of late to humanize herself ... [Anyone] who watches the cable premiere of Lady Gaga & The Muppets Holiday Spectacular ... will definitely gain a new appreciation for [her]". Maricela Gonzalez of Entertainment Weekly called Lady Gaga and the Muppets' Holiday Spectacular a "cross-promotional commercial", enabling Gaga to promote Artpop and enhancing the Muppets' popularity. Gonzalez described it as "equal parts warm, fuzzy, cynical, and depressed by consumerism overtaking the so-called 'holiday spirit'. But why fret? It's Lady Gaga and the Muppets!"

Myles McNutt of The A.V. Club gave the special a grade of C, criticizing it as a mere promotional vehicle for Gaga with the Muppets feeling like a last-minute addition. The production was unable to balance Gaga's album promotion with a Muppets holiday special: "Nothing in Lady Gaga & The Muppets' Holiday Spectacular destroys the sanctity of the Muppets ... However, the potential for a Muppets holiday special was never given room to materialize amidst a Lady Gaga concert special designed to sell her new album. The choice to combine the two may have reached out to a broader audience, but the incongruence of the special's various parts ... was bound to frustrate a sizable portion of that audience." Todd Martens of the Los Angeles Times agreed, criticizing the special's commercial nature; he also said its songs were "less fit for a Muppet-like music special, and no one seemed willing to stray too far from the show's message of selling a product. Rather than aim for holiday timelessness, this was self-promotion, with the Muppets often coming to Gaga's world than the other way around." Billboard's Chris Willman also gave it a negative review, citing the show's palpably-low budget and its dialogue, guest appearances, Gaga's lip-syncing and production: "If the 90 seemingly endless minutes of Lady Gaga and the Muppets Holiday Spectacular had a predecessor, it might be the long-suppressed Star Wars Christmas Special [sic], though nothing here was so outrageously wrong (or right) that people will still be bootlegging this one in 35 years' time. At least there was a familiar 'why is this happening?' question hovering over the star-crossed proceedings, albeit without the benefit of any guest stars as seriously wacky as that one's to show up and redeem the incongruousness. We knew Bea Arthur - we were friends with Bea Arthur - and RuPaul, you're no Bea Arthur."

== Personnel ==
Credits adapted from the special itself.

- Lady Gaga as herself
- Tom Kane as the Announcer

=== Muppet performers ===
- Steve Whitmire as Kermit the Frog, Beaker, Rizzo the Rat, Statler and Lips
- Eric Jacobson as Miss Piggy, Fozzie Bear, Animal and Sam Eagle
- Dave Goelz as Gonzo, Bunsen Honeydew, Waldorf, Zoot and Albert the Rabbit
- Bill Barretta as Rowlf the Dog, Dr. Teeth, Swedish Chef, Pepe the King Prawn, Bobo the Bear and Big Mean Carl
- David Rudman as Scooter and Janice
- Matt Vogel as Camilla the Chicken, Floyd Pepper, Lew Zealand and Norman the Sheep
- Peter Linz as Walter

=== Guest appearances ===
- Kristen Bell as herself
- Joseph Gordon-Levitt as himself
- Elton John as himself
- RuPaul as himself
- Youthful Praise as themselves

== See also ==
- List of Thanksgiving television specials
