= Muppet Babies (1984 TV series) =

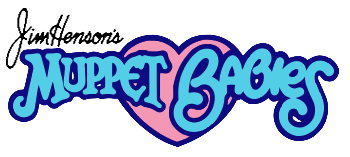
- Also known as: Jim Henson's Muppet Babies
- Genre: Fantasy; Comedy; Adventure; Musical
- Created by: Jim Henson
- Based on: The Muppet Show by Jim Henson
- Developed by: Jeffrey Scott
- Written by: Jeffrey Scott (seasons 1–3); Sindy McKay; Larry Swerdlove; Hank Saroyan; J.R. Young
- Directed by: Hank Saroyan
- Voices of: Frank Welker; Laurie O'Brien; Greg Berg; Russi Taylor; Katie Leigh; Howie Mandel (seasons 1–2); Dave Coulier (seasons 3–8); Barbara Billingsley
- Theme music composer: Hank Saroyan; Rob Walsh
- Opening theme: "Muppet Babies"
- Ending theme: "Muppet Babies" (instrumental) (season 1) "Little Muppet Monsters theme" (instrumental) (seasons 2–8)
- Composers: Rob Walsh (seasons 1–6); Robert Irving (seasons 7–8); Hank Saroyan (seasons 7–8)
- Country of origin: United States
- Original language: English
- No. of seasons: 8
- No. of episodes: 107 (list of episodes)

Production
- Executive producers: Margaret Loesch (seasons 1–6); Lee Gunther (seasons 1–5); Jim Henson (seasons 5–7); Michael K. Frith (seasons 6–8); Joe Taritero (seasons 6–8)
- Producers: Bob Richardson (seasons 1–7); John Ahern (seasons 1–5); Robert Shellhorn (seasons 5–6); Roy Allen Smith (seasons 6–8)
- Running time: 25 minutes
- Production companies: Marvel Productions; Henson Associates (1984–1986) (seasons 1–3); Jim Henson Productions (1987–1991) (seasons 4–8)

Original release
- Network: CBS
- Release: September 15, 1984 – November 2, 1991

Related
- The Muppet Show (1976–1981); Little Muppet Monsters (1985); Muppet Babies (2018–2022)

Jim Henson's Muppet Babies, commonly known by the shortened title Muppet Babies, is an American fantasy comedy animated television series produced by Marvel Productions for Jim Henson Productions. The show portrays toddler versions of the Muppets living together in a nursery under the care of a woman known as Nanny, involving the concepts of the power of imagination and creative problem-solving. The show's main target group is for children aged 2–5. The idea of presenting the Muppets as children appeared in a dream sequence in The Muppets Take Manhattan (1984), released two months before Muppet Babies debuted. The idea was a success, and it transformed into a spin-off.

The show aired from September 15, 1984, to November 2, 1991, as part of the Saturday-morning cartoons lineup on CBS. The show received universal acclaim for its animation, visuals, writing, humor, educational values, and appeal to younger and older audiences. It spawned a successful merchandise and won seven Daytime Emmy Awards (including four consecutive awards for Outstanding Animated Program), as well as a Humanitas Prize. Due to its popularity, the show remained on television in the United States for a decade, but is unable to stream on Disney+ due to copyright and licensing fees regarding the film and television footage used in episodes.

The rights are now held by The Walt Disney Company following the company's acquisition of The Muppets franchise in 2004. A reboot of the series premiered on Disney Jr. on March 23, 2018.

== Premise ==
Promotional artwork for the series, featuring (clockwise from bottom-left) Baby Animal, Baby Skeeter, Baby Scooter, Baby Fozzie, Baby Piggy, Baby Kermit, Baby Gonzo, and Baby Rowlf

The series stars Kermit the Frog, Miss Piggy, Fozzie Bear, Animal, Scooter, Skeeter, Rowlf the Dog, and Gonzo as toddlers. Supporting characters include Bunsen Honeydew, Beaker, and Camilla in the form of Gonzo's stuffed chick. In the final two seasons, Bean Bunny and Statler and Waldorf made regular appearances. Several Muppets made guest appearances, including Janice as an older preteen and Kermit's nephew Robin as a tadpole.

The Muppet Babies live in a large nursery watched over by Nanny, who is seen only from the neck down. The babies' imaginary games transition from the nursery into scenes that become "real" to the babies, such as outer space and the past. The fantasies have the babies interact with live-action backgrounds, old films and photos, engravings, and hand-drawn backgrounds. The babies used their imaginations to have their own adventures based on everyday things and toys around them. They also use their imaginations to solve a problem.

In post-credits scenes, the babies are doing something related to the episode's plot. Their activities (mostly Gonzo's) are interrupted by Animal who crashes the scene in a comedic way and calls "Go bye-bye!"

== Cast ==
- Frank Welker as Baby Kermit, Adult Kermit (looped dialogue, episode 45), Baby Beaker, Baby Skeeter (Seasons 3–8), Camilla, Irma/Charlie (episode 12), The Chief Inspector of Scotland Yard (episode 31), Polly the Parrot (episode 38), Bosko the Snowman (episode 100)
- Laurie O'Brien as Baby Piggy, Captain Black Wig (episode 36)
- Greg Berg as Baby Fozzie, Adult Fozzie (looped dialogue, episode 45), Baby Scooter
- Russi Taylor as Baby Gonzo, Baby Robin, Aunt Fanny, and Camilla (occasionally)
- Katie Leigh as Baby Rowlf, Mrs. Mitchell
- Howie Mandel (Seasons 1–2) as Baby Skeeter, Baby Animal, Baby Bunsen
- Dave Coulier (Seasons 3–8) as Baby Animal, Baby Bunsen, Baby Bean Bunny, Janice, Uncle Statler and Waldorf, Camilla (occasionally), Himself (episode 91)
- Barbara Billingsley as Nanny

=== Additional ===
- Peter Cullen as Smoggy the Bear (episode 33), Football-Playing Bear (episode 33), Sor-Elbow (episode 33)
- Pat Fraley as Announcer
- Tress MacNeille as Skater Ka

== Episodes ==
Season	Episodes	Originally released	
Season	Episodes	First released	Last released
1	13	September 15, 1984	December 8, 1984
2	13	September 14, 1985	December 7, 1985
3	16	September 13, 1986	December 27, 1986
4	18	September 19, 1987	January 16, 1988
5	13	September 10, 1988	December 3, 1988
6	18	September 16, 1989	January 13, 1990
7	8	September 15, 1990	November 3, 1990
8	8	September 14, 1991	November 2, 1991

== Production ==
=== Origin ===
The idea for the show was created by Jim Henson and his staff, originating in Jim Henson's art department. During the creation of Sue Venning's Muppet Show Bill, Henson suggested to include the Muppets as "tiny little selves, in other words, as babies." The book was not changed, but the idea was described as "charming". Afterwards, the staff, including Michael K. Frith, created character designs of the Muppets as toddlers. After Frith showed a sketch of Baby Piggy to Henson, Henson decided to turn it into a line of merchandise. Throughout 1983, several marketers featured prototype versions of the Muppet Babies on merchandise such as infant and toddler clothing, nursery decor and diapers while Henson was developing toddler versions of the characters.

During production of The Muppets Take Manhattan, Miss Piggy's original fantasy sequence was written on the screenplay. Because Henson was enthused about the Muppet Babies, he convinced Frank Oz to include them in the film, replacing the original fantasy sequence. Despite Oz's dislike of the idea, he thought that the idea was brilliant. Shortly afterwards, the art department asked the workshop to create models of the puppets of the Muppet Babies. The staff of the workshop favored the idea and decided to include them in the film. The scene was shot on August 28, 1983. It is considered to be one of the most difficult scenes to shoot during production of the film, as the puppeteers had to perform the baby versions of the characters by using their "stubby little limbs." The film was released on July 13, 1984. The idea was a success, and it received very favorable reviews from fans. A music video of Henson's self-directed "I'm Gonna Always Love You", combined with scenes of the film and new footage, was created for MTV.

=== Development and writing ===
After filming of The Muppets Take Manhattan was completed, Henson felt that the brief scene featuring the Muppet Babies could be developed into a children's television series. Meanwhile, network executives and several others suggested Henson Associates to transform the Muppet Babies into a Saturday-morning cartoon. Although budgeting and scheduling conflicts prevented the idea from becoming a live-action series, CBS's former vice president of children's programming Judy Price looked at the "cute qualities" of the Muppet Babies in The Muppets Take Manhattan and thought the series would be successful in animation. After the concept of the series was created on March 10, 1984, Price granted permission to Henson and his staff for its proposal on April 13. Henson was skeptical, as he initially stepped away from Saturday-morning cartoons. However, he liked the idea a lot that he decided to create the show for something better.

Henson visited nearly every major studio in California while exploring the potential of an animated series. Henson chose to work with Marvel Productions after a meeting with Marvel Productions' vice president of network development Hank Saroyan and his team, including Bob Richardson and Jeffrey Scott, citing that he was impressed by their ability to adapt "challenging source material." Production commenced with Scott as head writer and Richardson and Saroyan as showrunners. Most animators from Marvel Productions thought the series would be a disaster, believing that transferring from live-action to animation could possibly not match the success of The Muppet Show. Richardson, producer, director, and developer of the series, proceeded with caution to market the audience, welcoming "the challenge of capturing the spirit of the characters with their distinctive personalities as babies."

Scott was tasked to incorporate the concept into the series, creating a series bible with major input from Richardson and Saroyan. Many development meetings with Henson were held in Los Angeles and New York City, where some creative ideas were discussed. For simplicity and to increase the potential for interactions, they decided to use the nursery as the setting like The Muppets Take Manhattan for all of them to be together. To focus on the "unique Muppet world", Nanny was only seen from the neck down to represent the kids' view of an adult. Henson and Marvel Productions agreed to implement the core theme of the power of creativity and encouragement of imagination. As the series needed another female character to contrast with Baby Piggy's "bombastic personality" and provide more feminine empowerment, Scooter's twin sister Skeeter was exclusively created for the show. All of the writing scripts for the show were done in Marvel Productions, with Jeffrey Scott writing all episodes of the first season. After Scott left the series by the third season, Saroyan, Sindy McKay, Larry Swerdlove, Mark Stratton, Lois Becker, and J. R. Young wrote the remaining episodes of the series. Richardson and Saroyan continued to work together until contractual issues led to Richardson's departure after the sixth season.

=== Casting and recording ===
Looking for new actors to "capture [the] spirit" of the Muppet Babies by bringing "zest and personality to the role at the same time", several actors auditioned for the series. While studying with Daws Butler, Greg Berg based his voice impressions of Baby Fozzie on Frank Oz's rendition of Fozzie and Baby Scooter on Robin, particularly his song "Halfway Down the Stairs". Laurie O'Brien nearly did not audition for the series. O'Brien's agent Herb Tannen called her during an afternoon to ask her to voice "Miss Piggy as a child." O'Brien responded that she had a "little girl's voice in [her] bag of tricks and figured [she] could probably add Miss Piggy's idiosyncrasies to [the] voice." Tannen answered that she could do the voice and the other three Muppets, scheduling the appointment at 10:45 a.m. for the next day. As O'Brien was busy rehearsing a drama she wrote, she did not want to go to the audition. Tannen convinced her to come to the audition by stating to her that it is a "game changer." Not owning a videocassette recorder at the time, O'Brien rented The Muppet Movie and brought it to her friend's house and played it on the recorder. O'Brien took the recorder and recorded a few sections of Miss Piggy's lines that represented her tone and attitude, practicing the lines several times with her "million dollar little girl's voice". On the day of her audition, O'Brien brought the recorder to the audition, listening to it when she lost Miss Piggy's rhythms and tone.

Russi Taylor, who was a "crazy" fan of The Muppet Show and Gonzo, wanted to be Baby Gonzo and auditioned for him. Howie Mandel voiced Baby Animal, Baby Bunsen, and Baby Skeeter. After the second season, Mandel left the show, and his roles were given to Frank Welker as Baby Skeeter and Dave Coulier as Baby Animal and Baby Bunsen. Finalizing the cast for Nanny, Saroyan brought in Barbara Billingsley, who was immediately loved by the cast. The first time the cast met her, they were worried and thought they had to behave, but Billingsley had fun as much as the cast did.

Recording sessions were held in various recording studios in Los Angeles. In the first session, Henson and Saroyan told the cast to "make the characters [their] own and above all to have fun[.]" Several recording sessions had to be stopped due to the laughter of the cast.

=== Designs and animation ===
By the start of production, several artists developed character models of the Muppet Babies, but most of them were deemed unusable. After analyzing character design issues, the team hired Frith to sketch what the characters should look like to solve the issues. Moving forward quickly, other design elements were incorporated into the show.

Henson's idea for its animation was to combine genres and ignore "hard-and-fast rules." Characters and backgrounds were created by artists of Marvel Productions. Scott proposed an idea to incorporate live-action footage, including public domain footage and clips from films released at the time, into the show to emphasize the power of the Muppet Babies' imaginations. According to Scott, it was an idea for a series he has been wanting to do for a while. Another idea was proposed to transform the backgrounds from the nursery to the fantasies of the characters that ranged from painted and drawn backgrounds to live-action footage and still photos. It was considered easy for Henson to secure the rights to films such as Star Wars and Raiders of the Lost Ark since he was friends with George Lucas, Steven Spielberg, and other Hollywood filmmakers. In one instance at 3:30 a.m., Henson and Saroyan left a development meeting and called with a phone from Saroyan's office in Los Angeles to Lucas in his hotel room in Hong Kong to grant permission to use footage from Star Wars, getting a film print of Star Wars within 48 hours.

From the first season to the fifth episode of the fourth season, the series' overseas production was from Toei Animation, which cost $30,000 per episode. In February 1985, the Japanese yen started to rise against the US dollar, and as a result, Toei Animation raised the cost to $50,000. AKOM was selected as an alternate, cheaper animation studio, animating the rest of the series.

=== Music ===
Alan O'Day and Janis Liebhart were involved with the music of the series. While Liebhart was on a phone call with her old friend Saroyan, Saroyan mentioned to her that music was slated for each episode and asked if she would submit a song. Liebhart responded that she barely remembered the Muppets and never watched children's shows. Saroyan explained the characters to her and stated that the first episode needed a 1950s-styled song for the next day, suggesting to also call O'Day. Not owning a home studio, Liebhart called O'Day and told him that they could "collaborate and get it done using his studio by the next afternoon." After Saroyan explained them about the first episode on a phone call, O'Day and Liebhart wrote their first song "Sleep Rockin'" for Baby Animal and submitted in the "next afternoon." O'Day and Liebhart wrote over 100 songs for the series. The theme song and "Rocket to the Stars" were written by Hank Saroyan and Rob Walsh; "Merry-Go-Round", "Dreams for Your Inspiration", "Camilla", and "Best Friends" were written by Scott Brownlee. The choices were finalized by Henson and CBS.

The songwriting team was committed to many challenges, including the limited vocal range of a voice actor singing in a character's voice and character pairings that would not harmonize well together. Getting a lot of help from Richardson and Saroyan, O'Day and Liebhart would receive the script and the direction of the style, finding a "common ground" for melodies and knowing which characters to blend with. They invented mysterious voices Pee Wee and Wee Wee to enforce a melody underneath the Muppet Babies.

Some of the voice actors had no singing experience and training prior to the production of the series, including Taylor, who was not trained as a singer, and Mandel, who needed a professional singer to help keep him on key. Recording sessions of music started out with the cast singing in the same room. Proving to be unsuccessful, the cast started to record the songs individually. Liebhart was the vocal coach of the cast; Liebhart and Saroyan provided background vocals of the songs. Due to Berg unable to sing high notes as Baby Fozzie, Saroyan had to fill in several times. The seventh season episode "Sing a Song of Superheroes" had nine minutes of songs that required extra recording studio work.

The songs mainly compose kiddie lyrics and familiar music genres. Themes of the songs include individuality, friendship, and art. "Amadogus" (a parody of "Rock Me Amadeus" by Falco), a song featured in the third season episode "Fozzie's Family Tree", was released as a single in 1987 to promote the album Music is Everywhere. The song was chosen as a Featured Pick by Cashbox, stating that the "playful tune could garner notoriety as a novelty hit." Bill Wedo of The Morning Call called the song "particularly funny", but stated that "kids will enjoy it [while] adults will find it a riot." Dee Ann Rexroat of The Gazette called the song as the "best-of-show honors" of the live show Muppet Babies' Live!.

== Themes ==
The show focuses on the central ideas of the power of imagination and creative problem-solving to promote an educational concept of creativity. Hank Saroyan considered the idea as Jim Henson's vision for children to "believe that anything is possible." The techniques of imaginations contributed to the show, such as live-action footage and photographic backgrounds, was stated to interconnect ideas, stories, and characters in a dramatic play. D.W. Winnicott, a psychoanalytic theorist, described the show as "the intermediate area... allowed to the infant between primary creativity and objective perception based on reality-testing." Author Marsha Kindle described the show's techniques as the "kind of transgressive identification across other borders" and a "specialty."

Other frequent themes involve books and reading, facing fears, finding new ways to play with old toys, imagining adulthood, and facing common childhood firsts. Diane LaBlanc of The Defender analyzed that the moral of the first-season episode "Scooter's Hidden Talent" is finding and developing "inspiration and talent". In the book Playing with Power in Movies, Television, and Video Games, the sixth-season episode "The Green Ranger" was analyzed for its transmedia intertextuality, commodified masquerade, obsolescence, and death to address readers who are concerned about children's interactions on Saturday-morning shows. The seventh-season episode "Sing a Song of Superheroes" included popular opera arias to interest younger viewers in opera. The episode also served as an unofficial tribute to Jim Henson.

== Release ==
=== Broadcast ===
Muppet Babies premiered on September 15, 1984, at 9:00 am (EST) as part of the Saturday-morning lineup on CBS. During the 1984–1985 television season, the show competed with NBC's The Smurfs. The first-season episode "Gonzo's Video Show" was shown as a primetime special on December 18, 1984.

Due to success of the first season, CBS ordered an additional program to be paired with the second season of the series. For a brief run in the second season, the program became Muppets, Babies, and Monsters, and a second half-hour was dedicated to a new show called Little Muppet Monsters. This show featured live-action puppets and cartoons starring the adult Muppet characters. The program premiered on September 14, 1985. At the time, the program faced competition with ABC's Ewoks & Star Wars Droids Adventure Hour. After three episodes, CBS canceled Little Muppet Monsters. At the time of cancellation, over nine episodes were in various stages of production. CBS filled the spot vacated by the program with new episodes of Muppet Babies for an hour. When they ran out, CBS substituted episodes from the previous season.

In the 1987–1988 television season, Muppet Babies was expanded to three episodes after CBS pulled Garbage Pail Kids before it aired due to controversy. On July 11, 1988, Broadcasting Magazine announced that the series would be syndicated on Claster Television for the 1989–1990 television season. The show officially debuted on the network on September 18, 1989. The show continued in re-runs on the network until 1992. On October 5, 1992, the show started airing in re-runs on Nickelodeon. The show continued in re-runs on the network until December 31, 1998. On April 1, 1999, it was announced the series would air as part of Odyssey Network's rebrand. The show reran on Odyssey Network from April 4, 1999, to March 2000. In Canada, it aired on YTV, and later Treehouse TV.

=== Home media ===
A number of Muppet Babies episode were released on VHS between 1988 and 1999 in the United States. Kraft Foods offered two Muppet Babies tapes sponsored by Kraft Marshmallows in 1989. Buena Vista Home Video released Explore with Us, Let's Build, and Time to Play on January 29, 1993, pricing at $12.99 per tape. The home video series, Yes, I Can, was released with Yes, I Can Learn and Yes, I Can Help on June 16, 1995 and Yes, I Can Be a Friend on August 11, 1995 as part of Jim Henson's Preschool Collection, pricing at $12.99 per tape. The series focused on Robin the Frog, who asks his uncle Kermit for assistance in different chores he was struggling with. Each tape included two Muppet Babies episodes. In 1999, Interactive Learning Group released three Muppet Babies tapes for the Video Buddy interactive video play system, pricing at $15.95 per tape.

In 2003, four episodes were made available, in uncut form, as bonus DVDs with 10-inch Muppet Babies plush toys distributed by Toy Play: "The Daily Muppet", "Eight Take Away One Equals Panic", "Piggy's Hyper-Activity Book", and "Gonzo's Video Show". There have been no plans announced of other DVD releases of Muppet Babies. In 2023, animator Guy Gilchrist confirmed that Muppet Babies would least likely be available for streaming due to copyright and trademark difficulties.

== Reception ==
=== Critical response ===
Throughout the show's run, it received universal acclaim from critics. After its debut, David Bianculli of Knight-Ridder Newspapers commented that it is one of the two Saturday-morning cartoons that "sound promising [compared to the other two programs]" and praised the show as a "wonderful addition to the Saturday-morning roster." Mike Hughes of Garnett News Service ranked the show as one of the two best Saturday-morning shows of 1984, describing the Muppet Babies as "cute" and the script as "fresh and funny". He praised the script as "much better than [other Saturday-morning shows]." In his "On TV" review on The Reporter Dispatch issue from October 21, 1984, he also commented that the writing "ranks up" with The Adventures of Rocky and Bullwinkle and Friends and Danger Mouse. Steve McKerrow of The Evening Sun stated that the show is a "standout" to "cheaply-executed" Saturday-morning cartoons and described it as a "cartoon outgrowth [...] that makes [the audience] wish all children's programs could be this good." He also stated that it is the "kind of show that puts the bulk of the Saturday line-up to shame". He praised the show as "clever" and "honestly funny", commenting that the show takes a "floor-level, child's-eye view of the world". He also praised the Muppet Babies as "well and colorfully animated". Later, on his article from September 28, 1985, he commented that the program Muppets, Babies & Monsters is a "welcome addition to the [Saturday-morning] lineup."

Television critic Rick Forchuk reviewed that the show is "vastly better than [any primetime shows] in [the 1984–1985 television season]." He described the show as "different" and a "throwback to a different time". He also praised the animation as "superb, three dimensional, and vivid" and the plot and stories as "unpredictable" and "exciting as anything". He concluded that it is a "great show for adults [and] kids." Walt Belcher of The Tampa Tribune commented that the show is "[one of the] few bright spots [of Saturday-mornings]" and described it as "pleasant". In her initial review, Ellen Klein of Kids 'N' TV criticized its visuals as "not startling", but commented that the show has "enough originality to make it stand out to other Saturday-morning cartoons". In her revised review from 1985, she gave it a perfect 4 out of 4 stars, welcoming Muppets, Babies & Monsters as an exception to the Saturday-morning trend "full of robots, monsters, wrestlers, ghosts, and super-powered Galactic Guardians [that appealed] to older children." She described the series as "fun", "inventive", and "exciting without being threatening or scary." She concluded that the series is "one of the best [on Saturday-mornings]." Howard Rosenberg of The Los Angeles Times stated that Muppets, Babies & Monsters was the "best Saturday-morning kid [program]", describing it as "wonderful". Ron Weiskind of Pittsburgh Post-Gazette called the show the "most imaginative cartoon on the tube these days." Bill Wedo of The Morning Call commented that the songs "manage [Henson's magic to entertain children and adults]." Susan Stewart of Detroit Free Press rated the series a perfect four stars, reviewing that it is a "vast improvement over [the] first-generation Muppets."

The show was also well received by fans and audiences. In a Critics-at-Large review from May 5, 1985, Maria E. Allman from Hamburg, New York, called the show a "clever offering" and praised Baby Kermit, Baby Piggy, and Baby Gonzo for providing "humor and antics". She concluded that it is a "treat" and a "relief" for "parents and grandparents who have grown tired of the unappetizing fare and superhero junk[...]" In 1986, a survey in Woodrow Wilson School and Nellie F. Bennett School stated that their children's top-ranked show was Muppets, Babies & Monsters.

=== Ratings ===
Muppet Babies proved highly popular with audiences. In the 1984–1985 television season, the show was ranked as the most popular Saturday-morning cartoon on CBS and in the top five of 42 network shows. It was also ranked fifth on the most popular Saturday-morning show of the season. On December 18, 1984, the primetime broadcast of "Gonzo's Video Show" received a 9.9 Nielsen rating with a share of 15%. In 1985, the program Muppets, Babies & Monsters was rated No. 1 on CBS. After the program was replaced by two episodes of Muppet Babies, the ratings increased from the previous season. The series remained as CBS's number-one Saturday-morning show. As of 1986, it was the second most popular children's programming among the top 30, attracting more than four million audiences on each week.

Ratings decreased by the end of the series. In the 1990–1991 television season, the show only garnered a 2.4 Nielsen household rating with a 14% share. Despite the decrease in ratings, the show garnered a 4.6 Nielsen rating with a 55% share in the 2-11 age group and a 4.9 Nielsen rating with a 63% share in the 6-11 age group.

=== Accolades ===
Between 1985 and 1991, Muppet Babies gained twelve awards from 27 nominations, including four consecutive Daytime Emmy Awards for Outstanding Animated Program. On August 1, 1985, the show became the first recipient to receive an award for Outstanding Animated Program at the Daytime Emmy Awards. It continued to win the category until 1989, holding a record for the most wins in the category (tied with Arthur). In 1985, Jeffrey Scott received a Humanitas Prize for the first-season episode "Eight Take Away One Equals Panic", which earned him a $10,000 prize.

List of awards and nominations
Year	Award	Category	Nominee(s)	Result	Ref.
1985	12th Daytime Emmy Awards	Outstanding Animated Program		Won	
1985	12th Daytime Emmy Awards	Outstanding Film Sound Editing	Robert T. Gillis; Richard C. Allen; Ron Fedele; Michael L. DePatie; Richard Bruce Elliott; Michael Tomack	Won	
1985	10th Humanitas Awards	Children's Animation Category	Jeffrey Scott (For "Eight Take Away Equals Panic")	Won	
1986	13th Daytime Emmy Awards	Outstanding Animated Program		Won	
1986	13th Daytime Emmy Awards	Outstanding Achievement in Music Direction and Composition	Rob Walsh	Nominated	
1986	13th Daytime Emmy Awards	Outstanding Film Sound Editing	Robert T. Gillis; Alison Cobb; Michael Tomack; Michael L. DePatie; Ron Fedele; Richard Bruce Elliott; Richard C. Allen	Nominated	
1986	13th Daytime Emmy Awards	Outstanding Film Sound Mixing	Bill Thiederman; Bob Minkler; Lee Minkler	Nominated	
1986	8th Youth in Film Awards	Exceptional Family Animation Series or Specials		Won	
1987	14th Daytime Emmy Awards	Outstanding Animated Program		Won	
1987	14th Daytime Emmy Awards	Outstanding Film Sound Mixing	Bill Oliver; Paul Aronoff	Nominated	
1987	14th Daytime Emmy Awards	Outstanding Film Sound Editing	Ron Fedele; Michael Tomack; Jim Blodgett; Steven C. Brown; David Hankins; Warren Taylor; Alison Cobb; Richard C. Allen	Nominated	
1988	CINE Competition	Animation	Jim Henson	Won	
1988	15th Daytime Emmy Awards	Outstanding Animated Program		Won	
1988	15th Daytime Emmy Awards	Outstanding Film Sound Mixing	Jeffrey J. Haboush; Greg P. Russell	Nominated	
1988	15th Daytime Emmy Awards	Outstanding Film Sound Editing	Richard C. Allen; Ron Fedele; Rusty Tinsley; Billy B. Bell; Scott A. Tinsley	Nominated	
1988	13th Humanitas Awards	Children's Animation Category	Star Kaplan; Maia Mattise (For "My Muppet Valentine")	Nominated	
1989	16th Daytime Emmy Awards	Outstanding Animated Program		Nominated	
1989	16th Daytime Emmy Awards	Outstanding Performer in a Children's Series	Barbara Billingsley	Nominated	
1989	16th Daytime Emmy Awards	Outstanding Film Sound Editing	Al Breitenbach; Ron Fedele; Richard C. Allen; Steven D. Williams; Kenneth R. Burton	Won	
1989	16th Daytime Emmy Awards	Outstanding Film Sound Mixing	Jeffrey J. Haboush; Greg P. Russell	Won	
1989	22nd NAACP Image Awards	Outstanding Comedy Series		Won	
1990	17th Daytime Emmy Awards	Outstanding Performer in a Children's Series	Barbara Billingsley	Nominated	
1990	17th Daytime Emmy Awards	Outstanding Achievement in Film Editing	Al Breitenbach	Nominated	
1990	17th Daytime Emmy Awards	Outstanding Film Sound Mixing	Andy D'Addario; Jeffrey J. Haboush	Nominated	
1990	17th Daytime Emmy Awards	Outstanding Film Sound Editing	Al Breitenbach; Ron Fedele; Steven D. Williams; Kenneth R. Burton; Jackson Schwartz; Dean G. Manly	Nominated	
1990	23rd NAACP Image Awards	Outstanding Comedy Series		Won	
1991	16th Humanitas Awards	Children's Animation Category	Jeffrey Scott (For "Romancing the Weirdo")	Nominated	

=== Honors ===
Muppet Babies was voted "Top Cartoon of the Childhood Days" by the Irvin Hall newspaper's weekly review of the Pennsylvania State University in 2007. In January 2009, IGN named Jim Henson's Muppet Babies as the 31st-best in the Top 100 Best Animated TV Shows.

== Impact and legacy ==
Muppet Babies was known to start a trend of relaunching popular cartoon characters as younger versions of themselves. This trend can be seen in numerous TV series such as A Pup Named Scooby-Doo, The Flintstone Kids, Tom & Jerry Kids, Jungle Cubs (based on characters from Disney's The Jungle Book) and Baby Looney Tunes.

As of 2000, approximately 300,000 animation cels of the show were stored by the Jim Henson Company Archives off-site.

In 2007, a specific case dedicated to the show was added in The Jim Henson Exhibit in Leland, Mississippi.

== Other media ==
=== Albums ===
The first album, Rocket to the Stars, was released in July 1985 by Parker Brothers Music on LP and cassette. It featured an outer space adventure with eleven original songs starring the Muppet Babies characters. The songs and dialogue were mixed by Hank Saroyan, Rob Walsh, and Geni Jackson at Wilder Brothers Studio. It was reissued on July 20, 1987, by Columbia Records. The album, renamed Rock It to the Stars, was re-released in September 1993 by Jim Henson Records on CD and cassette. Sandra Tompkins of The Fresno Bee called the album an "exciting Oz-like journey", praising the songs as "catchy sing-alongs". Peter Fawthrop of AllMusic gave the album four out of five stars, praising the songs and voices, but criticized the storybook format of the album, including the "dramatic lengths" and "loaded dialogue". The second album, Music is Everywhere, was released on July 20, 1987, by Columbia Records on LP and cassette. Doug Hoagland of The Fresno Bee praised the music as "catchy".

=== Comics ===
In 1985, Marvel Comics produced a monthly comic book of the Muppet Babies with their Star Comics imprint, drawn by Marie Severin. The idea was created by Guy Gilchrist, who submitted approximately twenty samples to Jim Henson, along with a multi-panel strip. The series lasted for 26 issues. The last two issues, #25 (May 1989) and #26 (July 1989), were drawn by Nate Butler. In 1992, Harvey Comics acquired the rights to produce Muppet Babies comics and produced a further three issues (restarting at issue #1).

The Muppet Babies also appeared in Star Comics Digest (also known as Star Comics Magazine). This comic was printed in digest-size format, and features a number of reprinted short stories in each issue. The series itself lasted for thirteen issues from 1986 until 1988. The Muppet Babies appeared in some, but not all, of the issues.

=== Live performances ===
Muppet Babies had three live performances produced between 1986 and 1990. They were produced by Bob Shipstad and VEE Corporation. Each tour involved 16 cast members, eight crew members, concession staff, and support office staff. All of the voices and music were pre-recorded, and the costumes were designed and produced in Henson Associates to retain authenticity. Muppet Babies Live! premiered on August 28, 1986, at Ohio Center in Columbus, Ohio. The same premise followed with Muppet Babies' Magic Box in 1987 and Muppet Babies' Where's Animal? in 1988, which ended in May 1990 after 40 cities. The production values built in Minneapolis, including the sets, properties, costumes, and lightings, cost $1 million.

Professional dancers auditioned in New York City, Los Angeles, and Minneapolis to fill in roles. Approximately 600 people auditioned for the live performances per year. The cast would rehearse in Minneapolis for up to 10 hours per day in three weeks. Andrew Carl Wilk, director of the live performances, stated that directing them from prerecorded voices to costumes and movements was difficult. The production stage would be constructed with sets, properties, and lighting for four to seven hours for each destination. The dancers were transported by a chartered bus on each Monday and had a day off on each Tuesday. When the tours ended, they traveled back to their homes across the United States six times.

The live performances received critical acclaim. In her review of Muppet Babies' Live!, Sara Ann Conkling of Special to the Free Press praised Hank Saroyan's sketches as "full of color, sound, and activity." She also described the dancers as "remarkably agile" and added that the "special lighting effects added to the sense of wonderment." Dee Ann Rexroat of The Gazette commented that Muppet Babies' Live! is not "something parents have to suffer through", calling the live show "well produced" and "cute" and the sets and costumes as "quite imaginative". Dave Tianen of Green Bay Press-Gazette commented that Muppet Babies' Live! is "colorful, fast-paced, gentle, bright, tuneful, and mercifully short." In his review of Muppet Babies' Magic Box, Bill Wedo of The Morning Call reviewed that the show was "true to the original", praising the scene changes as "quick and clever". He also praised the Star Trek skit as the "beauty of the show", stating that "grown-ups can find kid stuff entertaining, too." In her review of Muppet Babies' Where's Animal?, Esther Benenson of Richmond Times-Dispatch commented that parents "[will] have trouble getting excited about the plot" and have a "hard time adjusting to the piercingly high voice of Baby Piggy", describing the plot as "sparse" and praising some of the medleys as "entertaining".

== 2018 reboot ==
On October 26, 2016, it was announced that a reboot of the series began production. As opposed to the traditional animation of the original show, the reboot used CGI and is targeted to children ages 4–7 with each episode consisting of two 11-minute stories. Mr. Warburton, creator of Cartoon Network's Codename: Kids Next Door, served as the executive producer while former SpongeBob SquarePants writer Eric Shaw served as the story editor. A reboot of the series premiered on Disney Junior on March 23, 2018.

== Other appearances ==
In 1987, the live-action version of the lead characters appeared, in the form of an old home movie, during A Muppet Family Christmas. The segment itself was cut from American and Canadian home video releases due to copyright licensing issues with "Santa Claus Is Comin' to Town".

In 1990, Baby Kermit, Piggy, and Gonzo made small appearances in the drug prevention television special Cartoon All-Stars to the Rescue.

== See also ==
- List of animated spin-offs from prime time shows
- Sesame Beginnings
