= Little Muppet Monsters =

1985 television series

- Created by: Jim Henson
- Starring: Jim Henson; Frank Oz; Jerry Nelson; David Rudman; Richard Hunt; Camille Bonora; James Kroupa
- Voices of: Greg Berg; Bob Bergen; Richard Hunt; Hal Rayle; Frank Welker
- Country of origin: United States
- No. of episodes: 3 (10 unaired)

Production
- Executive producers: Margaret Loesch; Lee Gunther; Diana Birkenfield
- Production locations: Manhattan, New York City
- Running time: 30 minutes
- Production companies: Marvel Productions; Henson Associates

Original release
- Network: CBS
- Release: September 14 – September 28, 1985

Related
- Muppet Babies (1984–91); Muppets Tonight (1996–98)

Little Muppet Monsters is an American Saturday morning television series featuring the Muppets that aired three episodes on CBS in 1985. The first season of Muppet Babies did so well in the ratings that CBS decided to expand the series from a half-hour to an hour, pairing Muppet Babies with Little Muppet Monsters. They called the hour-long package Muppets, Babies and Monsters.

== Plot ==
The show was anchored by three young Muppet monsters: Tug (performed by Richard Hunt), Molly (performed by Camille Bonora), and Boo (performed by David Rudman). The three have started their own basement show after an incident where Scooter has them put in the basement after Molly and Boo played water polo in the living room. They are joined by Nicky Napoleon (performed by James Kroupa) and his Emperor Penguins as their music act.

== Production ==
Storyboard director Scott Shaw discussed the show in MuppetZine issue #3 (Winter 1993). "The concept of this second half-hour was neither simple nor particularly well-developed," he said. "A trio of new (live-action) Muppet Monster Kids, working from the basement of the adult Muppets' home, create their own television station which broadcasts only to the TV sets in the house upstairs. Their 'shows' were such regular segments as "Pigs in Space: The Animated Series", "Kermit the Frog, Private Eye", "Muppet Sport Shorts" with Animal, "Gonzo's Freaky Facts and Oddball Achievements," and "Fozzie's Comedy Corner", among others.

Although thirteen episodes were produced (most of which were incomplete at the time of cancellation), only three of them ever aired. According to Muppet performer Kathryn Mullen, and the Henson Company archives, Marvel Productions failed to deliver the full season's animated segments in time for airing. CBS responded by rerunning episodes of Muppet Babies to fill the second half hour until Marvel finished the series' animated segments. Due to high ratings from the Muppet Babies reruns, the network decided not to pick up the remaining episodes of Little Muppet Monsters. The three completed episodes never appeared on television after their initial air dates. Plans to officially re-release the three episodes have not been made.

Despite its quick cancellation, the theme song to Little Muppet Monsters lived on; the instrumental version of the song became the closing theme for Muppet Babies and remained so until the show ended in 1991.

In 1991, segments of the animated "Pigs in Space" and "Kermit the Frog, Private Eye" from the second episode of Little Muppet Monsters titled "Space Cowboys" were re-shown in the final episode of Muppet Babies titled "Eight Flags Over the Nursery".

== Cast ==
=== Muppet performers ===
- Richard Hunt as Tug Monster, Scooter, and Janice
- Camille Bonora as Molly Monster
- David Rudman as Boo Monster
- Jim Henson as Kermit the Frog and Dr. Teeth
- Frank Oz as Miss Piggy, Fozzie Bear, and Animal
- Jerry Nelson as Floyd Pepper
- Dave Goelz as Gonzo the Great and Zoot
- Pam Arciero as Penguin
- Cheryl Blalock as Cow, Raggmopp
- Michael Earl Davis as Penguin
- Jim Kroupa as Nicky Napoleon
- Noel MacNeal as Rat, Cow, Magic Book
- Kathryn Mullen as Penguin, Rat
- Martin P. Robinson as Rat, Cow, Walrus

=== Animated segments voice cast ===
- Greg Berg as Fozzie Bear, Dr. Julius Strangepork
- Bob Bergen as Dr. Bunsen Honeydew, Captain Link Hogthrob
- Richard Hunt as Beaker, Animated Muppet Shorts Narrator
- Hal Rayle as Animal, Gonzo the Great, Miss Piggy
- Frank Welker as Kermit the Frog, Chicken Who Crossed the Road, Banana Nose Maldonado (episode 1), Milo Sockdrawer (episode 3)

== Episodes ==
No.	Title	Original release date
1	"In the Beginning"	September 14, 1985
2	"Space Cowboys"	September 21, 1985
3	"The Great Boodini"	September 28, 1985

=== Unaired Episodes ===
- Hi, Mars
- Monster Measles
- Gonzo's Talent Hunt
- Can't Stop the Music
- Boo Monster Ace Reporter
- Feels Like Rain
- Foo-Foo Phooey
- Penguin for a Day
- Gunko
- Mail-Order Guest

== Crew ==
- Hank Saroyan – Producer, Voice Director

== Creators ==
- Characters designed by: Michael K. Frith
- Tug built by: Ed Christie
- Molly built by: Joanne Green
- Boo built by: Rollie Krewson
