= The Muppets Take Manhattan =

1984 film by Frank Oz

- Theatrical release poster
- Directed by: Frank Oz
- Screenplay by: Frank Oz; Tom Patchett; Jay Tarses
- Story by: Tom Patchett; Jay Tarses
- Based on: The Muppet Show by Jim Henson
- Produced by: David Lazer
- Starring: Jim Henson; Frank Oz; Dave Goelz; Steve Whitmire; Richard Hunt; Jerry Nelson; Art Carney; James Coco; Dabney Coleman; Gregory Hines; Linda Lavin; Joan Rivers
- Cinematography: Robert Paynter
- Edited by: Evan Lottman
- Music by: Ralph Burns (score); Jeff Moss (songs)
- Production companies: Henson Associates; Delphi II Productions
- Distributed by: Tri-Star Pictures
- Release date: July 13, 1984
- Running time: 94 minutes
- Country: United States
- Language: English
- Budget: $8 million
- Box office: $25.5 million

The Muppets Take Manhattan is a 1984 American musical comedy film directed by Frank Oz, the third theatrical film featuring the Muppets. The film stars Muppet performers Jim Henson, Oz, Dave Goelz, Steve Whitmire, Richard Hunt, Jerry Nelson, as well as special appearances by Art Carney, James Coco, Dabney Coleman, Gregory Hines, Linda Lavin, Liza Minnelli, Joan Rivers, and Brooke Shields. Filmed in New York City during the prior summer, it was released theatrically in the United States on July 13, 1984, by Tri-Star Pictures. A fantasy sequence in the film introduced the Muppet Babies characters.

The Muppets Take Manhattan was the first film to be directed solely by Oz, who previously co-directed The Dark Crystal with Henson. The film received mostly positive reviews from critics with praise for its puppetry, humor, songs and characters but criticism for some of its writing. The film was a box office success, grossing $25.5 million on a budget of $8 million.

== Plot ==
The Muppets perform their theatrical production of Manhattan Melodies for their graduating class at Danhurst College, and encouraged by the audience's enthusiastic response, decide to take the show to Broadway, certain they will become instant stars. Arriving in Manhattan, the group meet producer Martin Price, but are interrupted by the police, who have arrived to arrest him as a wanted con artist, whose real name is Murray Plotsky. The Muppets try other producers for several months to no avail, depleting both their morale and their finances. Thinking they are becoming a burden to Kermit when he snaps at them, the rest of the Muppets agree to go their separate ways to find work, though Miss Piggy secretly remains in Manhattan to keep an eye on Kermit. Though disappointed by the development, Kermit vows to make the show a hit and enlists the assistance of diner owner Pete, his aspiring fashion designer daughter Jenny, and the diner's staff of rats led by Rizzo.

Kermit's attempts to promote the show fail, while he learns from letters received from his friends that Scooter works at a Cleveland, Ohio movie theater; Fozzie has joined some other bears hibernating in Maine but cannot sleep; Dr. Teeth and the Electric Mayhem have a gig in Pittsburgh, Pennsylvania, performing in a retirement home; Gonzo and Camilla are trying to make a successful water skiing act in Michigan; and Rowlf is working at a dog kennel in Delaware. In Central Park, Jenny comforts Kermit about his setbacks, while an envious Piggy watches. While she is distracted, Piggy's purse is stolen but she gives chase and, in the ensuing chaos, reunites with Kermit, and takes a job at Pete's. During a carriage ride, Piggy has a fantasy in which she, Kermit and a few other Muppets are babies, but wakes up when Kermit says the carriage had stopped.

Kermit receives a letter from producer Bernard Crawford, who is interested in the musical. However, Kermit discovers the letter was actually written by his son Ronnie, who is eager to prove himself as a producer and believes that Manhattan Melodies is a worthwhile endeavor. His father reluctantly agrees to support him. Thrilled that the show will then be ready in two weeks, Kermit heads back to the diner but is so distracted that he walks into oncoming traffic and is struck by a passing taxi knocking him unconscious.

Piggy summons the rest of the Muppets back to New York, and informs them that Kermit has disappeared. At the hospital, Kermit has lost his memory. He finds his way to Madison Avenue where he meets a trio of frogs in the advertising business, Bill, Gil and Jill; he joins them, taking the name Phil. The rest of the Muppets search in vain for Kermit throughout the week while rehearsing for the show, and on opening night reluctantly accept that the show will have to go on without him. Meanwhile, Bill, Gil, Jill and "Phil" have ended up at Pete's diner, and Kermit's friends recognize Phil as Kermit when he unknowingly taps out "Together Again" on glasses of water. At the Biltmore Theatre, "Phil" still does not remember his friends, but when he ridicules the idea of being in love with Piggy, she karate chops him in a fit of rage, bringing Kermit's memory back. As they hurriedly prepare for the opening number, the Muppets ask Kermit if their new friends can watch from backstage. Kermit instead works them all into the show as supernumerary actors.

The show is a smash hit, culminating in what is intended to be a staged wedding between Kermit and Piggy's characters, until Miss Piggy swaps out Gonzo with an ordained minister. Kermit hesitates but accepts.

== Cast ==
=== Live-action cast ===
- Louis Zorich as Pete, the owner and chef of Pete's Diner.
- Juliana Donald as Jenny, Pete's kind daughter, a waitress and aspiring fashion designer.
- Lonny Price as Ronnie Crawford, Bernard's son and an aspiring Broadway producer.
- Gates McFadden as Nancy, the secretary to Martin Price.
- Graham Brown as Mr. Wrightson, the stuffy manager of the perfume store where Miss Piggy briefly works.

=== Muppet performers ===
- Jim Henson as Kermit the Frog, Rowlf the Dog, Dr. Teeth, the Swedish Chef, Waldorf, The Muppet Newsman, Baby Kermit, Baby Rowlf and Ernie
- Frank Oz as Miss Piggy, Fozzie Bear, Animal, Sam Eagle, Baby Piggy, Baby Fozzie, Bert and Cookie Monster
- Jerry Nelson as Floyd Pepper, Camilla the Chicken, Lew Zealand, Crazy Harry, Pops, Dog Construction Worker and Bear
- Richard Hunt as Scooter, Janice, Statler, Black Dog, Baby Scooter and Beaker
- Dave Goelz as Gonzo the Great, Chester the Rat, Bill the Frog, Zoot, a Penguin, Jim the Dog, Baby Gonzo, Dr. Bunsen Honeydew and Bear
- Steve Whitmire as Rizzo the Rat and Gil the Frog
- Kathryn Mullen as Jill the Frog
- Karen Prell as Yolanda the Rat and Frank the Dog
- Brian Muehl as Tatooey the Rat
- Bruce Edward Hall as Masterson the Rat and Beth Bear

=== Cameo guest stars ===
- Frances Bergen as Mr. Winesop's receptionist
- Bernie Brillstein as a theatrical producer.
- Art Carney as Bernard Crawford, a renowned theatrical producer and Ronnie's father.
- James Coco as Mr. Skeffington, a man who leaves his dog at the kennel where Rowlf works.
- Dabney Coleman as Murray Plotsky, a con artist posing as a theatrical producer named Martin Price.
- Elliott Gould as a police officer at Pete's Diner. Gould previously appeared as a cameo in The Muppet Movie.
- Gregory Hines as a roller skater whose skates are borrowed by Miss Piggy.
- Dr. Cyril Jenkins as the minister performing Kermit and Miss Piggy's wedding.
- Mayor Edward I. Koch as himself
- John Landis as Leonard Winesop, a known theatrical producer.
- Linda Lavin as Kermit's doctor, who diagnoses his amnesia.
- David Lazer as a customer at Sardi's
- Liza Minnelli as herself
- Joan Rivers as Eileen, a perfume saleswoman who works with Piggy.
- Brooke Shields as a Pete's Diner patron
- Vincent Sardi Jr. as himself

== Production ==
Under the working title of Muppet Movie III, Jim Henson initially planned to film in late spring 1983. Having directed The Great Muppet Caper and The Dark Crystal back-to-back, Henson decided to serve as executive producer while David Lazer served as producer. Upon selecting fellow Muppet performer and The Dark Crystal co-director Frank Oz to handle directorial duties, Henson stated, "I was looking at the year ahead and I thought my life was very busy and I thought maybe it was a time to have Frank directing one of these."

The first draft titled The Muppets: The Legend Continues, written by Muppet Caper screenwriters Jay Tarses and Tom Patchett, was dismissed by Oz for being "way too over jokey". After being given Henson's encouragement to tinker with the script, Oz revised the screenplay in an effort to develop the "oomph of the characters and their relationships". Once the script was completed and the sets were built, special consultant David Misch was brought in to write cameos for some guest star appearances. Originally, this list of guest stars contained Dustin Hoffman, Steve Martin, Michael Jackson, Lily Tomlin, Richard Pryor and Laurence Olivier, to name a few. According to Misch, Hoffman was going to play a Broadway producer and planned to do an imitation of film producer Robert Evans (The Godfather), which he later did in the 1997 film Wag the Dog. However, at the last minute, Hoffman decided that the role could be offensive to Evans and dropped out, following which all the other big names left as well. Because of the dropped cameos, Misch and Oz ended up rewriting most of the dialogue.

== Music ==
The Muppets Take Manhattan: The Original Soundtrack

Soundtrack album by The Muppets
- Released: 1984
- Genre: Soundtrack
- Length: 28:27
- Label: Warner Bros.

The Muppets chronology
The Great Muppet Caper: The Original Soundtrack (1981)	The Muppets Take Manhattan: The Original Soundtrack (1984)	The Muppet Christmas Carol: Original Motion Picture Soundtrack (1992)

Professional ratings
Review scores
Source	Rating
Allmusic	4.5/5 stars

The Muppets Take Manhattan: The Original Soundtrack contains all of the songs written by Jeff Moss and prominent score cues composed by Ralph Burns from the film, as well as several portions of dialogue and background score. The album reached No. 204 on Billboard's Bubbling Under the Top LPs chart and was nominated for a Grammy Award for Best Recording for Children, but lost to Shel Silverstein's audio edition of Where the Sidewalk Ends.

This is the only Muppet film soundtrack that has not been released on CD. However, three tracks from the album can be found on the 2002 compilation album The Muppet Show: Music, Mayhem, and More. A new version of "Together Again (Again)" was performed in the 2014 film Muppets Most Wanted and its soundtrack.

Jeff Moss was nominated for an Academy Award for Best Original Song Score for the music he composed for The Muppets Take Manhattan, but lost to Purple Rain by Prince.

Side A
No.	Title	Writer(s)	Artist(s)	Length
1.	"Together Again"	Jeff Moss	Kermit and Friends	2:54
2.	"You Can't Take No for an Answer"	Jeff Moss	Dr. Teeth	2:00
3.	"Saying Goodbye"	Jeff Moss	Kermit and Friends	3:06
4.	"Rat Scat (Something Cookin')"	Jeff Moss	Rizzo the Rat	1:18
5.	"Together Again (Carriage Ride)"	Jeff Moss (arr. Ralph Burns)	Kermit the Frog, Miss Piggy, Statler and Waldorf	1:07
6.	"I'm Gonna Always Love You"	Jeff Moss	The Muppet Babies	2:55
7.	"William Tell Overture"	Gioachino Rossini (arr. Ralph Burns)	The Chickens	0:59
Total length:				14:19

Side B
No.	Title	Writer(s)	Artist(s)	Length
1.	"Looking for Kermit"	Ralph Burns	Instrumental	1:42
2.	"Right Where I Belong"	Jeff Moss	Kermit and the Muppets	2:12
3.	"Somebody's Getting Married/Waiting for the Wedding"	Jeff Moss	The Muppets	2:36
4.	"He'll Make Me Happy"	Jeff Moss	Miss Piggy, Kermit and the Muppets	2:10
5.	"The Ceremony"	Jeff Moss	Miss Piggy, Kermit and the Muppets	1:10
6.	"Closing Medley (Final Credits)"	Jeff Moss (arr. Ralph Burns)	The Muppets	4:18
Total length:				14:08

== Release ==
=== Marketing ===
The Muppets Take Manhattan was adapted by Marvel Comics in 1984, as the 68-page story in Marvel Super Special #32. The adaptation was later re-printed into a three-issue limited series, released under Marvel's Star Comics imprint (November 1984 – January 1985). The film's script was adapted into comic form by writer Stan Kay with art by Dean Yeagle and Jacqueline Roettcher. Unlike in the film, the comic depicts Gonzo, Floyd Pepper, Animal, Janice, Dr. Teeth, and Zoot in their outfits from The Muppet Show.

Additionally, a book-and-record set of the film was released in the form of a vinyl record through the Muppet Music Records label.

=== Re-release ===
In celebration of the film's 40th anniversary, The Muppets Take Manhattan returned to theaters for two days on August 13 and 16, 2024.

=== Home media ===
Unlike Henson's previous films (The Muppet Movie, The Great Muppet Caper, and The Dark Crystal), The Muppets Take Manhattan was originally released by Tri-Star Pictures and not produced by ITC Films, mainly because ITC was suffering from extreme financial difficulties at the time. Thus, unlike the previous films, the distribution rights to The Muppets Take Manhattan remained under control of Sony Pictures Home Entertainment, who re-issued the film on home media in partnership with The Jim Henson Company in 1998 (as Sony distributed Henson Company-owned works on home video at the time as part of the Henson-Sony partnership which formed Jim Henson Pictures) but did not revert to The Walt Disney Company in 2004. Because of this, it is one of three Muppet films (along with Muppets from Space and the direct-to-video feature Kermit's Swamp Years) whose home video and television distribution rights are still controlled by Sony Pictures, and not the Walt Disney Studios.

The Muppets Take Manhattan was first released on VHS and the now defunct CED Videodisc format by CBS/Fox Video in 1985, which then re-issued it in 1991, followed by a re-release from Columbia TriStar Home Video and Jim Henson Home Entertainment on June 1, 1999. The 1999 VHS contained a slightly edited cut from previous versions, possibly derived from the television broadcast version. Cuts include removal of the audio from the Tri-Star Pictures logo, Gonzo's grunts are missing in the most recent re-releases, the scenes of Animal shouting "Bad man!" to Mr. Price, the sound of Kermit's panting for breath immediately after leaving Leonard Winesop's office, removal of the words "Oh my God" in one scene, and scenes with Miss Piggy hitting the purse snatcher.

A DVD version was re-released on June 5, 2001, with the cuts from the 1999 VHS version restored. It was re-released alongside Muppets from Space on a double feature DVD by Sony Pictures Home Entertainment on June 9, 2008. A Blu-ray edition was re-released on August 16, 2011, and contains the same bonus features as the DVD. A 4K remaster of the film was re-released on October 24, 2023, on 4K Ultra HD Blu-ray, making it the first film that features the Muppets to receive a 4K Ultra HD Blu-ray re-release.

== Reception ==
=== Box office ===
On its opening weekend, The Muppets Take Manhattan grossed $4.4 million, ranking in fifth place at the box office. The film ultimately earned $25.5 million in the United States and Canada, placing it as the second highest-grossing G-rated film of 1984 (behind a re-issue of Walt Disney Productions' Pinocchio).

=== Critical reaction ===
Review aggregator Rotten Tomatoes reports that 85% of 26 critics have given the film a positive review, with an average rating of 7/10. The site's consensus stated that "If it's not quite as sharp as The Muppet Movie, The Muppets Take Manhattan is still a smart, delightfully old-fashioned tale that follows the formula established by the first two movies -- a madcap adventure assisted by a huge group of human stars." On Metacritic, the film has a score of 64 out of 100 based on 9 critics, indicating "generally favorable reviews".

Roger Ebert of the Chicago Sun-Times gave The Muppets Take Manhattan three stars (out of four), stating in his review that "the plot of [the] movie has been seen before." However, Ebert went on to say that just about everything in the film was enjoyable and that Kermit finally solves his long-lasting identity crisis. Gene Siskel of the Chicago Tribune gave the film 3 1/2 stars (out of four) writing it was "a most enjoyable backstage musical, culminating, as you probably have heard, with a wedding ceremony between you-know-who and you-know-who." Variety positively stated: "The Muppets Take Manhattan is a genuinely fun confection of old-fashioned entertainment that will appeal to both children and their parents, weaned on Henson's syndicated tv series." Sheila Benson of the Los Angeles Times, who expressed disappointment in The Great Muppet Caper, felt the Muppets "have found their footing adroitly now; the emphasis is back on real values and identifiable emotions." In his annual Movie Guide, Leonard Maltin gave the film a three star rating (out of four) as well citing that the film is an "enjoyable outing with bouncy songs, [with a] nice use of N.Y.C. locations."

Gary Arnold of The Washington Post described the film as being "progressively lackluster", finding the Muppets' disbandment to be a "misbegotten juncture that the script proceeds to unravel, losing a unified storytelling thread while keeping tabs on the scattered troupe until the inevitable reunion." He further felt the film lacked "rousing musical numbers", in which he blamed Henson and Oz for pinning "everything on a poorly calculated and staged marital spectacular, as Miss Piggy finally cons Kermit to the altar -- a terminally sappy bad idea to begin with." Vincent Canby of The New York Times wrote: "This may be only an impression, based on the fact that the past always looks greener than the present, but The Muppets Take Manhattan seems just a little less extraordinaire than the two other features." Kathleen Carroll of the New York Daily News gave the film a 2½ star rating out of four, remarking that "despite the contribution of such well known actors as Mayor Koch, The Muppets Take Manhattan is strangely flat. It's no wonder that the Muppets' severest critics, the grumpy Waldorf and Statler, are less than pleased with this mushy movie. Watching Miss Piggy and "Kermie" cuddle together in a hansom cab, Waldorf grimly notes, 'They're in love.' Growls Statler: 'Kind of makes you sick, doesn't it?'." Rob Salem of The Toronto Star, remarked that "the Muppet charm has been as stretched as far is it can go. Now that the pig and the frog are blissfully wedded, it's time to lay them to rest. Better that Jim Henson and associates continue to branch out, as they did with The Dark Crystal, into new and very different stories and characters. Otherwise, in Muppet Movie IV, they'll be forced to deal with the reality of married life between a pretend pig and a phony frog. And that could get a little tricky."

== Abandoned follow-up series ==
On February 7, 2019, it was announced that Once Upon a Time showrunners Edward Kitsis and Adam Horowitz were working with actor Josh Gad on a TV series titled Muppets Live Another Day, set after the film's events, for Disney+. The series was to focus on the Muppets, who disbanded some time after the film's events, reuniting after Rowlf disappears. However, on September 9, 2019, it was announced that the series had been scrapped due to creative differences following an executive change at The Muppets Studio.
