= Greg Berg =

American voice actor

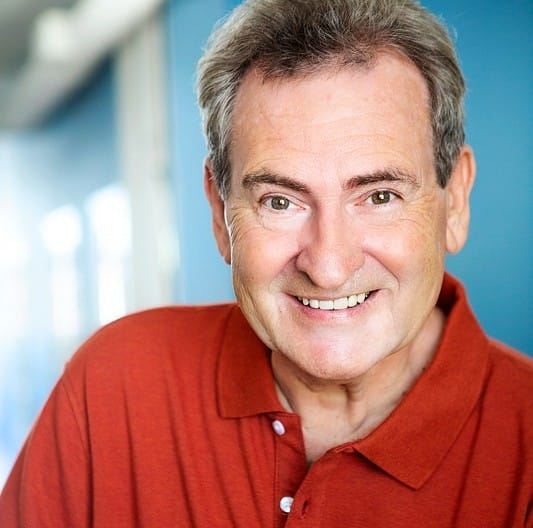
- Born: Brooklyn, New York, U.S.
- Occupation: Voice actor
- Years active: 1982–present

Greg Berg is an American voice actor known for his roles in animation, video games, and film. He is recognized for voicing Baby Fozzie and Baby Scooter in Muppet Babies and for stepping in as the voices of Donatello and Bebop in Teenage Mutant Ninja Turtles. He also provided the voice of Igor in Transformers: Dark of the Moon and contributed to video game titles such as EverQuest II and Hitman: Absolution.

Berg has spoken about the evolution of the voice acting industry, highlighting the increasing role of technology while emphasizing the continued importance of human performance. He has credited industry veterans Daws Butler and Harvey Lembeck as mentors who helped shape his approach to voice acting.

== Filmography ==
=== Anime ===
Year	Title	Role	Notes
1998	Flint the Time Detective	Pteri	2 episodes; English dub
2002	The Cat Returns	Additional Voices	English dub

=== Film ===
Year	Title	Role	Notes
1984	Revenge of the Nerds	Larry Fine Robot	Uncredited
1988	Pound Puppies and the Legend of Big Paw	Beamer (voice)	Direct-to-video
1988	Normality	Monster Voices (voice)	
1990	Box-Office Bunny	Audience (voice)	Short Film
1995	Toy Story	Local Announcer (voice)	
2002	Highway	Alligator Boy	
2003	Rockfish	Mutant Animal (voice)	Short Film
2004	Gopher Broke	Gopher (voice)	Short Film
2005	Here Comes Peter Cottontail: The Movie	Montresor (voice)	Direct-to-video
2005	Chicken Little	Additional Voices (voice)	
2006	The Wild	Vulture (voice)	
2009	Gnomes & Trolls: The Secret Chamber	Sneaky (voice)	English Dub
2009	Ojai Bums	Alan	Short Film
2011	Transformers: Dark of the Moon	Igor (voice)	
2011	The Muppets	Stage Manager (voice)	Uncredited
2015	Concussion	Sportscaster	Uncredited
2016	Trolls	(Additional voice)	
2018	Gnomes & Trolls: The Forest Trail	Sneaky (voice)	English Dub

=== Television ===
Year	Title	Role	Notes
1982	The Book of Lists	Alexander Haig / Gerald Ford	Episode: "Pilot"
1982	Robotman & Friends	Robotman (voice)	
1983	CHiPs	Messenger in Gorilla Suit	Episode: "Hot Date"; uncredited
1984	The Love Boat	Additional Voices	Episode: "Vicki and the Fugitive/Lady in the Window/Stolen Years/Dutch Treat: Part 1"
1984	Knots Landing	Billy	2 episodes
1984	Partners in Crime	Voice	Episode: "Fantasyland"
1984–1991	Muppet Babies	Fozzie / Scooter (voice)	107 episodes
1985	Dallas	(voice)	Episode: "Dead Ends"
1985	Jim Henson's Little Muppet Monsters	Fozzie Bear / Dr. Julius Strangepork (voice)	Episode: "In the Beginning"
1986	Silver Spoons	Cabbie	Episode: "The Way We Weren't"
1986	Who's the Boss?	Robot (voice)	Episode: "The Christmas Card"; uncredited
1987	Married... with Children	Commercial Actor (voice)	Episode: "But I Didn't Shoot the Deputy"
1989–1991	Teenage Mutant Ninja Turtles	Donatello / Bebop / Sluggo (voice)	8 episodes
1989–1994	Garfield and Friends	Judge (voice)	8 episodes
1990	The Simpsons	Rory (voice)	Episode: "Bart vs. Thanksgiving"
1990	Moe's World	Bird Sounds (voice)	TV movie
1990–1991	Night Court	Young Bob Hope / Additional Voices (voice)	2 episodes; uncredited
1991	Yo Yogi!	Huckleberry Hound / Moe Wendell / Joe Wendell (voice)	10 episodes
1992	Bob	Additional Voices (voice)	Episode: "Terminate Her"; uncredited
1992	Sibs	(voice)	Episode: "The Eleanor Roosevelt Story"; uncredited
1994	Count DeClues' Mystery Castle	Talking Statue	TV movie
1994	Sliders	Gilligan on TV (voice)	Episode: "The King Is Back"; uncredited
1998	The Rat Pack	Eddie Cantor / Newscaster (voice)	TV movie; uncredited
1999	Sorority	Dean Tinker	
2006	Avatar: The Last Airbender	Pong (voice)	Episode: "City of Walls and Secrets"
2006	American Dad!	(voice)	Episode: "The Best Christmas Story Never Told"
2012	The Untold History of the United States	President Jimmy Carter / Gen. Curtis LeMay (voice)	2 episodes

=== Video games ===
Year	Title	Role	Notes
1994	Cyberia	Voices	
1995	Normality	Fatty	
1996	Shattered Steel	Voices	
2001	Monsters, Inc.	Fungus	
2002	Monsters, Inc. Scream Arena	Fungus	
2004	EverQuest II	18 characters	
2006	Desperate Housewives: The Game	Dr. Arthur Henrikson	
2009	Tom Clancy's H.A.W.X		
2009	inFamous	Male Pedestrian	
2011	Shadows of the Damned	Demons	
2012	Hitman: Absolution	Chris / Chicago Cops / Blackwater Guards	
2013	Lightning Returns: Final Fantasy XIII	Additional Voices	

=== Radio ===
- Rick Dees Morning Show L.A. and (Worldwide) Weekly Top 40 - John Revolting, others (20 year
