= Beaker (Muppet) =

Muppet character

- The Muppets character
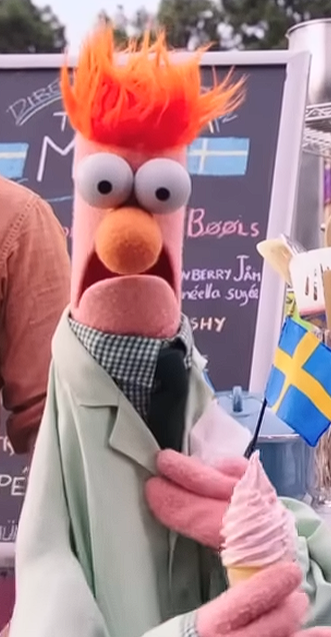
- First appearance: The Muppet Show (episode 202; 1977)
- Created by: Jim Henson
- Performed by: Richard Hunt (1977–1992); Steve Whitmire (1992–2016); David Rudman (2017–present)

In-universe information
- Species: Muppet
- Gender: Male
- Occupation: Assistant scientist, test subject
- Nationality: American

Beaker is a Muppet character from the sketch comedy television series The Muppet Show. He is the shy, long-suffering assistant of Dr. Bunsen Honeydew, and is also similarly named after a piece of laboratory equipment.

During the first season of The Muppet Show, Dr. Honeydew presented the Muppet Labs segments by himself; Beaker was added as his lab assistant from the second season on. Beaker has bulging eyes that can light up, a shock of red hair, and a drawbridge mouth which serves as a frown. He was originally puppeteered and voiced by Richard Hunt until Hunt's death in 1992, when the role was taken over primarily by Steve Whitmire. After Whitmire was fired in 2016, David Rudman took over the character.

Beaker is a magnet for disaster; he routinely experiences mishaps such as being blown up, electrocuted, eaten by large monsters, or afflicted with awkward side effects caused by Honeydew's experiments. Beaker communicates in a nervous, high-pitched squeak that sounds like "Mee-mee-mee-mee". In books and merchandise, the sound is spelled "Meep". In Muppets from Space, he "meeps" Honeydew's line "sadly temporary". Rarely he can say normal words, such as "Bye-bye." Otherwise, his tone or expression helps to communicate his meaning. This helps Beaker communicate to his viewers directly without having to speak any real words at all.

== Appearances ==
Beaker rapidly became a favorite with audiences, who both sympathized with and enjoyed laughing at his humorous sufferings. Occasionally, Beaker was able to take revenge, particularly in a segment when he inadvertently made numerous copies of himself and spent the rest of the episode chasing Dr. Honeydew around the theater. (This segment of "Muppet Labs" was from the Mac Davis episode.) In the 2008 TV special, A Muppets Christmas: Letters to Santa, Beaker is even more fortunate when he tests a wish machine and gets the company of model Petra Němcová, who can speak his meeping language, and not only refuses Honeydew's order to send her back, but then also successfully teleports away with her to apparently enjoy his first wish for the rest of the story.

Beaker has also appeared as a musical performer, singing "Danny Boy", "Carol of the Bells", and "Habanera" with the Swedish Chef and Animal, and "Feelings" and "Dust in the Wind" solo. He also sang "Ode to Joy" with his clones who were accidentally formed by Honeydew's copying machine. The "Danny Boy" performance was marked by the Chef's singing in his trademark gibberish and Animal's inability to remember anything but the first three words. For "Feelings", Animal had to shush the increasingly unruly crowd (who tormented the Muppets throughout the episode) so Beaker could finish: "QUIET!!...Thank you." In the 2011 film The Muppets, Beaker sang a comedic a cappella version of Nirvana's "Smells Like Teen Spirit" as part of a barbershop quartet with Sam the Eagle, Rowlf the Dog and Link Hogthrob. Because of Disney's designation of the Muppets franchise as being for family audiences, Beaker was given a crucial role replacing the song's more questionable lines like "a mulatto" and "my libido" with "mee-mee-mee-mo."

The two scientists were later incorporated into the Muppet Babies animated series. Howie Mandel (during early seasons) and Dave Coulier voiced Bunsen, and Frank Welker provided Beaker's squeaky meeps. Unlike his puppet counterpart, Baby Beaker can smile. An animated Beaker was also voiced by Richard Hunt, his usual performer during that period, when he appeared in the short lived Little Muppet Monsters series.

Beaker was performed by Kevin Clash in The Muppet Show Live, as all live scenes that featured him also featured Kermit, who was a higher priority for Steve Whitmire to play. Additionally, for his appearance at The Game Awards 2019, Beaker was performed by Peter Linz due to David Rudman being unavailable to attend.

== In popular culture ==
In a 2004 Internet poll sponsored by the BBC and the British Association for the Advancement of Science, Beaker and Dr. Bunsen Honeydew were voted Britain's favourite cinematic scientists. They beat Mr. Spock, their closest rival, by two-to-one, winning a third of the total votes.

Beaker features in an episode of WWE Raw, assisting Santino Marella ringside in his match with Jack Swagger by providing him with a special energy drink formulated by Dr. Honeydew. In the same episode, Beaker gets bullied by Christian Cage and is revealed to be distantly related to WWE wrestler Sheamus.

UK politicians Danny Alexander and Ed Miliband have both been disparagingly likened to Beaker in appearance. Moreover, it was revealed in an interview in 2021 that Manic Street Preachers drummer Sean Moore was nicknamed "Beaker" while at school.

== Filmography ==
- The Muppet Show (1977–1981) (TV)
- The Muppet Movie (1979)
- The Great Muppet Caper (1981)
- The Muppets Take Manhattan (1984)
- Muppet Babies (1984–1991) (TV) (voiced by Frank Welker)
- A Muppet Family Christmas (1987) (TV)
- The Muppets at Walt Disney World (1990) (TV)
- The Muppet Christmas Carol (1992) – Appearance as Charity collector
- Muppet Treasure Island (1996) – Appearance as Dr. Livsey's assistant
- Muppets Tonight (1996–1998) (TV)
- Muppets from Space (1999)
- It's a Very Merry Muppet Christmas Movie (2002) (TV)
- The Muppets' Wizard of Oz (2005) (TV)
- Studio DC: Almost Live (2008) (TV)
- A Muppets Christmas: Letters to Santa (2008) (TV)
- The Muppets (2011)
- Lady Gaga and the Muppets Holiday Spectacular (2013) (TV)
- Muppets Most Wanted (2014)
- The Muppets (2015–2016) (TV)
- Muppet Babies (2018–2022) (TV) (voiced by Matt Danner)
- Muppets Now (2020) (Disney+)
- Muppets Haunted Mansion (2021) (Disney+) – Appearance as a Staring Bust
- The Muppet Show (2026) (TV)

== See also ==
- Beaker (disambiguation)
- Muppet Mobile Lab
