= Scooter (Muppet) =

Muppet character

- The Muppets character
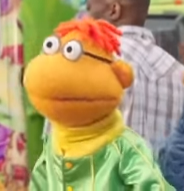
- First appearance: The Muppet Show (1976)
- Created by: Jim Henson
- Performed by: Principal performers; Richard Hunt (1976–1992); David Rudman (2008–present); see all below

In-universe information
- Species: Muppet human
- Gender: Male
- Occupation: Gofer / Stage manager
- Nationality: American

Scooter is a Muppet character from the sketch comedy television series The Muppet Show, known for being the backstage stage manager, utility stage crew member, and general all-around "gofer". He was originally performed by Richard Hunt until his death in 1992, and is currently performed by David Rudman.

== Characteristics ==
Scooter is orange with a darker orange sprout of hair. In keeping with the jokes about bespectacled Muppets such as Dr. Bunsen Honeydew, Scooter's eyes are actually the lenses of his glasses. Hunt based Scooter's personality on his own self from when he was younger.

A few things have been revealed about Scooter's family. As cited in Of Muppets and Men, when pressed about his family, he explained that his mother was a parrot but he did not know about his father. Scooter's uncle J.P. Grosse is a humanoid Muppet, suggesting that Scooter is meant to be one as well.

In the animated series Muppet Babies, he was redesigned as a brainy, computer-knowledgeable child and given a tomboyish twin sister named Skeeter, who never appeared as a live-action Muppet. However, she later appears as an adult in the Muppet Show comic series story arc "Family Reunion".

== Roles ==
Originally, Scooter got his job as a "gofer" because his rich uncle J. P. Grosse owned the theatre, and he maintained it through a combination of efficiency and nepotism. Originally, Scooter would often use his family connection to his advantage, making unreasonable demands on his uncle's behalf.

His antagonistic role was gradually discarded, and he became a legitimate assistant to Kermit, with the two becoming friends. Eventually, his job was often closer to that of a stage manager, or even that of a subordinate producer, and he would do whatever he could to help Kermit to (albeit unsuccessfully) keep order among the Muppets.

In the second through fourth seasons, Scooter featured in the cold openings, where he would enter the guest star's dressing room to tell them that there are only "fifteen seconds to curtain." However, the number of seconds sometimes changed. In the dressing room, a gag or short comical sketch would occur before the opening theme song. For the fifth season, a new style of cold opening featuring Pops replaced this format.

Scooter sometimes helped Miss Piggy to get Kermit to be romantically interested in her. He was also on good terms with Fozzie Bear, being less annoyed with his jokes than most people, and they performed duets and double acts onstage in a few episodes.

His relationship with Floyd Pepper, who frequently appeared backstage, may be comparable to Hunt's relationship with Jerry Nelson. The two puppeteers frequently collaborated, with the elder Nelson helping the younger Hunt to develop his performing abilities from the start. Hunt and Nelson were also known for being vocally talented, and Scooter sat in with the band on occasion (as a vocalist or guest musician). Scooter and Floyd's rendition of "Mr. Bass Man" symbolizes Hunt and Nelson's relationship.

Scooter has appeared in most Muppet films and television specials. In The Muppet Movie, Scooter acts as The Electric Mayhem's manager. In The Great Muppet Caper, he was a resident of the Happiness Hotel. In The Muppets Take Manhattan, he was among the core group who attended college together and struggled to put their show on. In this appearance, he was the treasurer of the group, and later took a leadership role in Kermit's brief, amnesia-fueled absence, making decisions for the group to follow. Also, Scooter made an appearance in the pre-show queue at the Disney attraction, Muppet*Vision 3D, formerly located at Disney's Hollywood Studios.

After his original performer's death in 1992, Scooter was not seen again until 1999 when he had a cameo in Muppets from Space, with one line of dialogue. He had somewhat larger roles in subsequent productions, beginning with It's a Very Merry Muppet Christmas Movie (2002). In The Muppets' Wizard of Oz (2005), he played the Wizard's assistant. He also took on supporting roles in the second Studio DC: Almost Live special (2008) and in A Muppet Christmas: Letters to Santa (2008).

Scooter later appears in The Muppets (2011) where he is working at Google and on his way to the TED conference, iPad in hand, when he is first seen. Just as in The Muppets Take Manhattan, Scooter here appears as a leading figure of the Muppets – he spearheads the clean-up and repairs of the Muppet Studio, and even takes over hosting duties for Kermit at one point. He has also been promoted to stage manager, a role he reprises in Muppets Most Wanted when the Muppets go on a world tour.

In the TV show The Muppets, he is the talent coordinator on Up Late with Miss Piggy.

He has a prominent role in Muppets Now, co-hosting Pepe's Unbelievable Game Show as well as having the responsibility of uploading the series onto Disney+ on time.

== Casting history ==
Scooter was first performed by Richard Hunt (1976–1992) until his death. Unlike most major Muppets, Scooter has been performed by seven different people. After a seven-year retirement following Hunt's death, the character went through a series of short-lived performers (1999–2005) before finding a new performer in David Rudman (2008–present).

Main Performers:

- Richard Hunt: The Muppet Show – Muppet*Vision 3D
- David Rudman: Studio DC: Almost Live – present

Alternate Performers:

- Greg Berg: Muppet Babies
- Adam Hunt: Muppets from Space (Voice only)
- Matt Vogel: Muppet RaceMania (voice)
- Brian Henson: It's a Very Merry Muppet Christmas Movie – Muppets Party Cruise
- Rickey Boyd: The Muppets' Wizard of Oz
- Ogie Banks: Muppet Babies 2018 revival
