= The Great Muppet Caper =

1981 film directed by Jim Henson

- Theatrical release poster by Drew Struzan
- Directed by: Jim Henson
- Written by: Tom Patchett; Jay Tarses; Jerry Juhl; Jack Rose
- Based on: The Muppet Show by Jim Henson
- Produced by: David Lazer; Frank Oz
- Starring: Jim Henson; Frank Oz; Dave Goelz; Jerry Nelson; Richard Hunt; Steve Whitmire; Charles Grodin; Diana Rigg; John Cleese; Robert Morley; Peter Ustinov; Jack Warden
- Cinematography: Oswald Morris
- Edited by: Ralph Kemplen
- Music by: Joe Raposo
- Production companies: ITC Entertainment; Henson Associates
- Distributed by: Universal Pictures; Associated Film Distribution (Note: The film's distribution rights were purchased by The Jim Henson Company from ITC Entertainment in August 1984. The film rights were then acquired by Walt Disney Studios upon their parent company's acquisition of the Muppets franchise in 2004; the film has since been reissued under the Walt Disney Pictures banner for home media releases. Universal Pictures retains theatrical distribution in the United States due to prior contractual obligations with the former Associated Film Distribution and ITC, but the film's ownership and copyright are controlled by Disney.) (North America); ITC Film Distributors Limited (United Kingdom and Ireland)
- Release dates: 26 June 1981 (United States); 30 July 1981 (United Kingdom)
- Running time: 98 minutes
- Countries: United Kingdom; United States
- Language: English
- Budget: $14 million
- Box office: $31.2 million (United States)

The Great Muppet Caper is a 1981 musical heist comedy film directed by Jim Henson (in his feature directorial debut). It is the second theatrical film featuring the Muppets. The film stars Muppet performers Henson, Frank Oz, Dave Goelz, Jerry Nelson, Richard Hunt, and Steve Whitmire, as well as Charles Grodin and Diana Rigg, with special cameo appearances by John Cleese, Robert Morley, Peter Ustinov, Peter Falk, and Jack Warden. The film was produced by ITC Entertainment and The Jim Henson Company and distributed by Universal Pictures. In the plot, the Muppets are caught up in a jewel heist while investigating a robbery in London.

The Great Muppet Caper was released by Universal Pictures and Associated Film Distribution on 26 June 1981 in the United States and on 30 July 1981 in the United Kingdom. The film received positive reviews from critics and grossed $31.2 million against a $14 million budget. It is the only Muppets feature film directed by Henson. Shot in the United Kingdom in 1980, the film was released shortly after the fifth and final season of The Muppet Show.

== Plot ==
Kermit the Frog and Fozzie Bear are newly hired investigative reporters at The Daily Chronicle, and Gonzo the Great is their photographer. After failing to cover a jewel theft from prominent fashion designer Lady Holiday, the three are fired. Kermit convinces their boss to let them travel to London to interview Lady Holiday, but they get no funds for the trip. As a result, they travel in the airplane's cargo hold. As the plane passes over London, they are thrown out in crates without parachutes, and they stay at the rundown Happiness Hotel, which a local refers to as “a place to park your carcasses,” where they meet the other Muppets.

Meanwhile, three of Lady Holiday's models, Carla, Darla and Marla, conspire with Lady Holiday's “irresponsible parasite” of a brother, Nicky, to steal a valuable necklace while Nicky and Lady Holiday are at dinner. Miss Piggy, an aspiring fashion model, surprises Lady Holiday at her office and is hired as a receptionist. Kermit arrives at the office and mistakes Piggy for Lady Holiday. Both are immediately taken with each other, so when Kermit asks to interview her about the robbery over dinner, Piggy agrees and does not tell him her true identity.

That night Kermit and Piggy, along with Fozzie and Gonzo who insisted on joining, have dinner at the expensive Dubonnet Club, arriving just before Lady Holiday and Nicky. While dancing, Kermit becomes even more infatuated with Piggy and Nicky falls for her after Lady Holiday recognizes her. When Nicky and the models succeed at stealing the necklace, Piggy's lie is exposed. Later that night, Gonzo develops the film he shot at the club and finds a photo of Nicky and the models stealing the necklace, but when the door to their makeshift darkroom is thrown open, the negative is spoiled.

The next day, Kermit and Piggy argue in a park about her deception, but eventually reconcile. At Lady Holiday's fashion show, one of the models fakes an injury and Nicky tells Piggy to go on in her place, giving the thieves the opportunity to frame Piggy for stealing the necklace. Piggy is arrested and Kermit vows to prove her innocence. Gonzo overhears Nicky and the models plotting to steal Lady Holiday's most valuable jewel, the Fabulous Baseball Diamond, and tells the rest of the Muppets who all agree to help free Piggy after Fozzie gives an inspiring speech about justice and truth. Kermit visits Piggy in jail, posing as her lawyer, and tells her of their plan. She tells him she loves him and they kiss.

The night of the robbery, Piggy breaks out of prison and steals a cement mixer to get to The Mallory Gallery, where the Diamond is displayed, but it runs out of gas. Just then, a motorcycle falls out of a passing van, which Piggy breaks the fourth wall to call “an unbelievable coincidence.” The rest of the Muppets get into the Gallery just in time to catch Nicky and the models. The Muppets play keep away with the Diamond, but Nicky eventually secures it and holds Kermit at gunpoint. Just then, Piggy bursts through a stained glass window on the motorcycle and subdues the thieves until the police arrive. As the police lead Nicky away, she tells him she wants to be with Kermit.

The Chronicle, with their story about the robberies on its front page, pays for Kermit, Fozzie, Gonzo and the rest of the Muppets to fly home. As before, they travel in the plane's cargo hold and are thrown out as it passes over the United States, but this time, they all parachute to safety.

== Cast ==
- Diana Rigg as Lady Holiday, a famous British fashion designer who has been the victim of a jewel heist
- Charles Grodin as Nicky Holiday, Lady Holiday's evil brother
- Michael Robbins as Henderson, the Mallory Gallery's security guard
- Peter Hughes as Stanley, a maître d' at the Dubonnet Club
- Peggy Aitchison as a prison guard
- Tommy Godfrey as a bus conductor
- Erica Creer as Marla, one of the Flowered Sox, Nicky's henchwomen.
- Kate Howard as Carla, one of the Flowered Sox, Nicky's henchwomen.
- Della Finch as Darla, one of the Flowered Sox, Nicky's henchwomen.

=== Cameo guest stars ===
- John Cleese as Neville, the easily-bored but occasionally entertainable lord of 17 Highbrow.
- Joan Sanderson as Dorcas, Neville's wife.
- Robert Morley as the British gentleman on the park bench
- Peter Ustinov as the cement-truck driver (his vehicle is stolen by Miss Piggy, after he denies her a ride to the Mallory Gallery).
- Jack Warden as Mike Tarkanian, editor-in-chief of The Daily Chronicle; also former college roommate of Fozzie's and Kermit's (unnamed) father.
- Peter Falk (uncredited) as a homeless watch-salesman.
- Jim Henson as a man photographed in the restaurant
- Richard Hunt as a cab driver in the opening musical sequence

=== Muppet performers ===
- Jim Henson as Kermit the Frog, Rowlf the Dog, Dr. Teeth, Waldorf, The Swedish Chef, The Muppet Newsman and Zeke
- Frank Oz as Miss Piggy, Fozzie Bear, Animal, Sam Eagle and Gramps
- Dave Goelz as Gonzo, Beauregard, Zoot, Dr. Bunsen Honeydew and Lubbock Lou
- Jerry Nelson as Floyd Pepper, Pops, Lew Zealand, Louis Kazagger, Crazy Harry and Slim Wilson
- Richard Hunt as Scooter, Statler, Sweetums, Janice, Beaker and Bubba
- Steve Whitmire as Rizzo the Rat and Lips
- Louise Gold as Annie Sue and Lou
- Kathryn Mullen as Gaffer the Cat
- Caroll Spinney as Oscar the Grouch

== Production ==
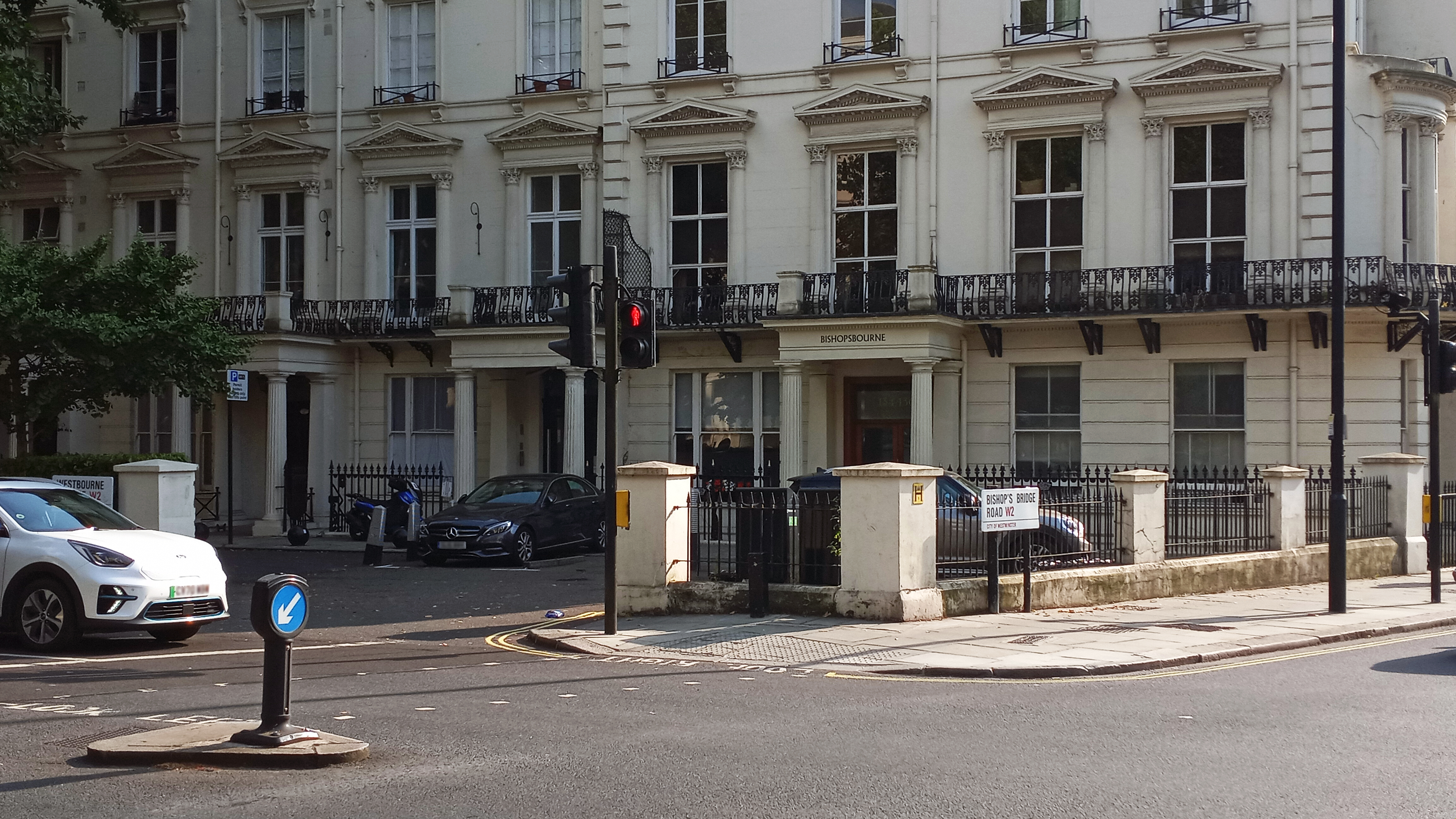
The "Bishopsbourne" building at Westbourne Terrace in the City of Westminster (pictured in 2024), used for the exterior shots of The Happiness Hotel

Development on the script for a second Muppets film began during the production of the fifth season of The Muppet Show. Henson wanted the film to be an homage to movie musicals of the past, "to have the fun and joy of those earlier films"; he also wanted Kermit in the role of a reporter-turned-detective, with a rival vying for the affections of Miss Piggy. A first draft of the script was completed by May 1980, and several titles were considered for the project—including Muppet Mania, A Froggy Day in London, The Rocky Muppet Picture Show, and The Great Muppetcapade (suggested by Henson's daughter Lisa)—before The Great Muppet Caper was chosen.

Filming began in the autumn of 1980 and ended in the early winter of 1981, over a period of twenty weeks.

The scene in which the cast of Muppets ride bicycles through Battersea Park, an evolution of the special effect of Kermit riding a bicycle from 1979's The Muppet Movie, was accomplished by puppeteer Faz Fazakas and Henson's son Brian through a combination of radio-controlled bicycles (some of which were attached to each other with rods), and marionette rigging. To achieve the effect of Miss Piggy swimming underwater, puppet designer Caroly Wilcox and the New York Muppet workshop created waterproof puppets made of compressed urethane foam, which did not soak up water like a typical foam Muppet would; to prevent the flocking from being damaged by the water, the flocking was glued and cured into place by baking. The material, however, was still prone to tearing, so around 40 different heads and seven different bodies were created for Miss Piggy. If one of the heads experienced damage during a take, it would be replaced by another, and the Muppet designers reportedly enjoyed destroying the discarded heads after each take.

== Release ==
The Great Muppet Caper was theatrically released on June 26, 1981, in the United States and on 30 July 1981 in the United Kingdom. In celebration of the film's 40th anniversary, The Great Muppet Caper was re-released into theaters for two days on August 8 and 11, 2021. The film also will return to theaters to celebrate the film's 45th anniversary in 2026, via Fathom Events.

=== Home media ===
The film was first released on Betamax, VHS, and LaserDisc in 1982 by 20th Century-Fox Video. On 29 January 1993, Buena Vista Home Video, under the Jim Henson Video label, re-released the film on VHS and LaserDisc.

It was reissued on VHS and released on DVD for the first time by Columbia TriStar Home Video and Jim Henson Home Entertainment on 1 June 1999. It was later released on DVD by Columbia TriStar Home Entertainment and Jim Henson Home Entertainment on 10 July 2001.

After The Walt Disney Company's acquisition of the Muppets in 2004, the film rights to The Great Muppet Caper were acquired by Disney; the film was reissued under the Walt Disney Pictures banner in home media formats and was re-released by Buena Vista Home Entertainment on DVD on November 29, 2005, as part of the Kermit's 50th Anniversary Edition line. Disney released The Great Muppet Caper on Blu-ray and DVD, alongside Muppet Treasure Island, on 10 December 2013. The film now streams in 4K Ultra HD on Disney+.

== Reception ==
=== Box office ===
After the success of The Muppet Movie (1979), and with good reviews, the film was expected to be a hit but grossed only half the amount of its predecessor. The film ultimately earned $31.2 million in the United States. The New York Times reported that one studio president had thought the use of the word "caper" in the title was a mistake due to the flagging success of caper movies at the time.

It is the fifth-highest grossing Muppet film behind The Muppets (2011), The Muppet Movie (1979), Muppets Most Wanted (2014) and Muppet Treasure Island (1996).

=== Critical response ===
Roger Ebert of the Chicago Sun-Times gave the film a two star rating (out of four), writing "...Henson and his associates haven't developed a screenplay that pays attention to the Muppet personalities. Instead, they ship them to England and dump them into a basic caper plot, treating them every bit as much like a formula as James Bond." He concluded his review by stating that "the lack of a cutting edge hurts this movie. It's too nice, too routine, too predictable, and too safe." Similarly, Sheila Benson of the Los Angeles Times felt the "Muppets don't belong in a caper movie. They are interpreters of character, relationship and the human condition. (Of the first film's writers, Jerry Juhl and Jack Burns, only Juhl remains, now collaborating with Jack Rose; Tom Patchett and Jay Tarses are the other pair of writers credited. You can frequently scent trouble, or at least a lack of cohesion, as the list of writers mounts.) Somebody let the air out of the jokes and the originality out of the melodies, which this time are by Joe Raposo."

Gene Siskel of the Chicago Tribune awarded the film three out of four stars, particularly singling out Miss Piggy for her "fabulous personality, a genuine star quality". However, he felt the film suffers "from a case of the we-know-we're-cute-so-we-can-get-by-with-anything disease. The disease manifests itself in the script that forever interrupts itself with jokes about the movie we're watching ... I expect the screenwriters to try to write a seamless story. Anybody can interrupt the action of a movie for gratuitous remarks such as these, but it's a very cheap laugh." Todd McCarthy, reviewing for Variety, wrote that The Great Muppet Caper "possesses all the charm of the first installment", in which he applauded Henson for showing "a sure hand in guiding his appealing stars through their paces." Vincent Canby of The New York Times compared the romantic chemistry between Kermit the Frog and Miss Piggy to that of Nelson Eddy and Jeanette MacDonald, in which he praised both characters as the "real stars" of the film.

The film holds a 78% approval rating based on 27 reviews on Rotten Tomatoes, with an average score of 6.5/10. The site's consensus says "The Great Muppet Caper is overplotted and uneven, but the appealing presence of Kermit, Miss Piggy and the gang ensure that this heist flick is always breezily watchable." On Metacritic, it has a score of 70 out of 100, indicating "generally favorable reviews". Audiences polled by CinemaScore gave the film an average grade of "A" on an A+ to F scale.

After the May 2021 death of co-star Charles Grodin, a number of writers called attention to his performance in the film. Robert Taylor of Collider wrote, "It's tough for a human actor to leave much of an impression in a Muppet movie. Their screen time is usually limited (often to just a cameo) and tends to consist of playing second banana to the Jim Henson-birthed lunacy. But in The Great Muppet Caper, Grodin employs his considerable comedy chops to more than hold his own, and he feels like a natural fit with the Muppet mayhem going on around him." Matthew Dessem wrote in Slate that "Hollywood is going to continue making movies, they say, and birds will continue to sing, and spring will continue to be lovely, and jewel thieves will continue to fall head over heels for pigs who are working as receptionists at posh British houses of fashion while attempting to launch their modeling careers. But a light has been extinguished, a greatness has gone out of the world, and it's fair to wonder if any other actor will ever embody pure, untamed desire for Miss Piggy the way Charles Grodin did. He was sensational."

== Music ==
The songs and score for the film were written and composed by Joe Raposo. In 1982, Raposo was nominated for an Academy Award for Best Original Song for "The First Time It Happens" but lost to "Arthur's Theme (Best That You Can Do)" by Burt Bacharach, Carole Bayer Sager, Christopher Cross and Peter Allen from Arthur.

In 1981, Miss Piggy won the Youth in Film Award for Best Young Musical Recording Artist for her performance of "The First Time It Happens", becoming the first, and only, non-human recipient in the history of the award.

=== Soundtrack ===
The Great Muppet Caper: The Original Soundtrack

Soundtrack album by The Muppets
- Released: 1981
- Genre: Soundtrack
- Length: 36:46
- Label: Atlantic

The Muppets chronology
| The Muppet Movie: Original Soundtrack Recording (1979) | The Great Muppet Caper: The Original Soundtrack (1981) | The Muppets Take Manhattan: The Original Soundtrack (1984) |

Professional ratings
Review scores
| Source | Rating |
|---|---|
| AllMusic | 3/5 stars |

The Great Muppet Caper: The Original Soundtrack contains all of the songs from the film, as well as several portions of dialogue and background score. The album reached #66 on Billboard's Top LPs and Tapes chart in 1981.

Track listing

All tracks are written by Joe Raposo.

| No. | Title | Artist(s) | Length |
|---|---|---|---|
| 1. | "The Main Title" (Instrumental) | | 2:48 |
| 2. | "Hey a Movie!" | Kermit the Frog, Fozzie Bear and The Great Gonzo | 2:44 |
| 3. | "The Big Red Bus" (Instrumental) | | 1:25 |
| 4. | "Happiness Hotel" | The Muppets | 3:07 |
| 5. | "Lady Holiday" (Instrumental) | | 1:13 |
| 6. | "Steppin' Out with a Star" | Kermit the Frog, Fozzie Bear and The Great Gonzo | 2:32 |
| 7. | "The Apartment" (Instrumental) | | 0:54 |
| 8. | "Night Life" | Dr. Teeth and the Electric Mayhem | 2:58 |
| 9. | "The First Time It Happens" | Kermit the Frog and Miss Piggy | 4:13 |
| 10. | "Couldn't We Ride" | The Muppets | 3:08 |
| 11. | "Piggy's Fantasy" | Stuart Kale and Kermit the Frog | 3:58 |
| 12. | "The Heist/The Muppet Fight Song/Muppets to the Rescue" (Instrumental) | | 3:47 |
| 13. | "Homeward Bound" (Instrumental) | | 0:52 |
| 14. | "Finale: Hey a Movie!" | The Muppets | 1:30 |
| 15. | "Finale: The First Time It Happens" | Kermit the Frog and Miss Piggy | 1:37 |
| Total length: | | | 36:46 |

== Bibliography ==
- Jones, Brian Jay (2013). Jim Henson: The Biography. New York: Ballantine Books. ISBN 9780345526113.
