= Dr. Bunsen Honeydew =

Muppet character

- The Muppets character
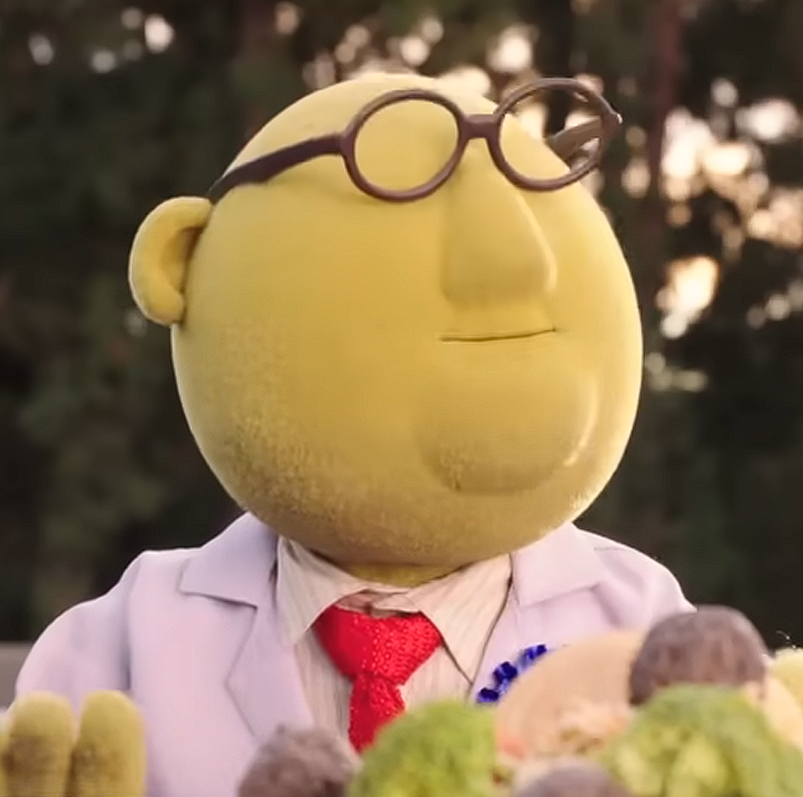
- First appearance: The Muppet Show (episode 108)
- Created by: Jim Henson
- Performed by: Dave Goelz (1976–present)

In-universe information
- Species: Muppet
- Gender: Male
- Title: Doctor (Ph.D.)
- Occupation: Scientist, inventor
- Nationality: American

Dr. Bunsen Honeydew is a Muppet character from the sketch comedy television series The Muppet Show, created and performed by Dave Goelz. He is a bald, yellow-green skinned, bespectacled, lab-coated scientist who presented periodic science segments from "Muppet Labs, where the future is being made today." The character has no eyes, only completely transparent, lensless glasses, giving the appearance of a stereotypical absent-minded intellectual. Bunsen's experiments usually cause great harm to his very nervous and long-suffering assistant Beaker, a nearly mute Muppet with a shock of reddish hair.

Bunsen's first name is derived from Robert Bunsen, after whom the Bunsen burner was named. His last name is a reference to the honeydew melon, which his head resembles, as well as to Honeywell Labs, a technology company which aired TV commercials ("That someday is today ... at Honeywell") well-known at the time of The Muppet Show.

Some of the inventions that were created and tested included: edible paper clips, all-purpose tenderizer, exploding hats, a gorilla detector, hair-growing tonic, a banana sharpener, a robot politician (played by Peter Ustinov), and an electric nose warmer. In response to the ancient quest of alchemy to turn lead into gold, Honeydew created a device that turned gold into cottage cheese. However, his various inventions and experiments almost always malfunction or backfire with Beaker being the victim.

== Appearance ==
Dr. Bunsen Honeydew's moniker is derived from the traditional piece of lab equipment, the Bunsen burner, plus the fact that his head was shaped and colored like a honeydew melon. He was rumored to be modeled after Lew Grade, whose company ITC Entertainment produced The Muppet Show. Henson responded in a Judy Harris interview:

Bunsen Honeydew was not specifically Lew Grade when we did him. It would have been easy to make him much more like Lew Grade if we had tried to and, in retrospect, I wish that we had. The character that owns the Muppet theatre only appeared a couple of times and I always — in looking back — wished that I had made that to look just like Lew Grade because he's very caricaturable.

Bunsen's performer Dave Goelz took inspiration for Bunsen's myopic work style from colleagues he knew throughout Silicon Valley while Goelz worked at Hewlett-Packard. One of his most endearing features is his lack of visible eyes, despite the fact that he wears glasses. Occasionally, Honeydew removes his glasses to clean them, or lifts them as if to get a better look at things, which is something of a running gag. Bunsen's eyes have only been seen once, during a sequence in The Great Muppet Caper. His appearance in Muppet Babies uses the shadow of his glasses' frames as a stand-in for eyes, which move to indicate his emotions, however the character model itself has no eyes.

Films where he appeared in major roles include The Muppet Movie (1979), The Muppet Christmas Carol (1992), Muppet Treasure Island (1996), Muppets from Space (1999), It's a Very Merry Muppet Christmas Movie (2002), and The Muppets' Wizard of Oz (2005) with Beaker. He also appeared in a small supporting role with Beaker in The Great Muppet Caper (1981) and A Muppets Christmas: Letters to Santa (2008), though in The Muppets Take Manhattan (1984) Bunsen and Beaker only appeared as background characters in the wedding scene. A scene with them was deleted.

In the Halloween 2011 episode of WWE Raw, Bunsen developed a specially formulated energy drink that provides strength, agility and fresher smelling breath to those who take it. He had Beaker go deliver it to Santino Marella for his match against Jack Swagger.

The duo appear in the 2011 feature film The Muppets, where they have been apparently working at CERN with the Large Hadron Collider after The Muppet Show ended. Their big CERN scene was deleted, as well as a scene with a bowling ball. Both Bunsen and Beaker appear in the follow-up feature film Muppets Most Wanted (2014) with a substantially larger role than the previous film including a featured invention of theirs, a big bomb-attracter vest. Bunsen and Beaker also appear in the 2015 TV series The Muppets, as the heads of the props and special effects department, and in Muppets Now as the hosts of "Muppet Labs Field Test".

== Fictional biography ==
Bunsen graduated from Carnegie Mellonhead University (a spoof of Carnegie Mellon University) and was employed as an assistant to Dr. Pinhole Burns. He is the founder of Muppet Labs.

Both scientists were later incorporated into the Muppet Babies animated series. Howie Mandel and Dave Coulier voiced Bunsen, and Frank Welker provided Beaker's squeaky meeps. Bunsen made an appearance in Little Muppet Monsters, voiced by Bob Bergen. Following Richard Hunt's death in 1992, the role of Beaker was taken over by Steve Whitmire. Whitmire performed that role until 2016.

In a 2004 Internet poll sponsored by the BBC and the British Association for the Advancement of Science, Beaker and Dr. Bunsen Honeydew were voted Britain's favourite cinematic scientists. They beat Mr. Spock, their closest rival, by a margin of 2 to 1 and won 33 percent of the 43,000 votes cast.

== Popular culture ==
- Honeydew (along with Beaker) was featured on the #19 Dodge Dealers Dodge Intrepid of Jeremy Mayfield in the 2002 Tropicana 400 in an advertising campaign in which he and his fellow Muppets were featured on a select few race cars.
- Honeydew made an appearance in the Family Guy episode "Jungle Love", with Peter Griffin as a meeping assistant rather than Beaker.
- Honeydew and Beaker make special appearances at The Game Awards 2019, where they promote the fictional Untitled Beaker Game, a parody of House House's Untitled Goose Game.

== Filmography ==
- The Muppet Show (1976–1981) (TV)
- The Muppet Movie (1979)
- The Great Muppet Caper (1981)
- The Muppets Take Manhattan (1984)
- Muppet Babies (1984–1991) (TV) (voiced by Howie Mandel, Dave Coulier)
- A Muppet Family Christmas (1987) (TV)
- The Muppets at Walt Disney World (1990) (TV)
- The Muppet Christmas Carol (1992) – Appearance as Charity collector
- Muppet Treasure Island (1996) – Appearance as Dr. Livesey
- Muppets Tonight (1996–1998) (TV)
- Muppets from Space (1999)
- It's a Very Merry Muppet Christmas Movie (2002) (TV)
- The Muppets' Wizard of Oz (2005) (TV) – Appearance as Himself
- Studio DC: Almost Live (2008) (TV)
- A Muppets Christmas: Letters to Santa (2008) (TV)
- The Muppets (2011)
- Lady Gaga and the Muppets Holiday Spectacular (2013) (TV)
- Muppets Most Wanted (2014)
- The Muppets (2015–2016) (TV)
- Muppet Babies (2018–2022) (TV) (voiced by Eric Bauza)
- Brain Games (2020) (TV)
- Muppets Now (2020) (Disney+)
- Muppets Haunted Mansion (2021) (Disney+) – Appearance as a Staring Bust
- The Muppet Show (2026) (TV)

== See also ==
- Muppet Mobile Lab
- Mad scientist
