= The Muppets discography =

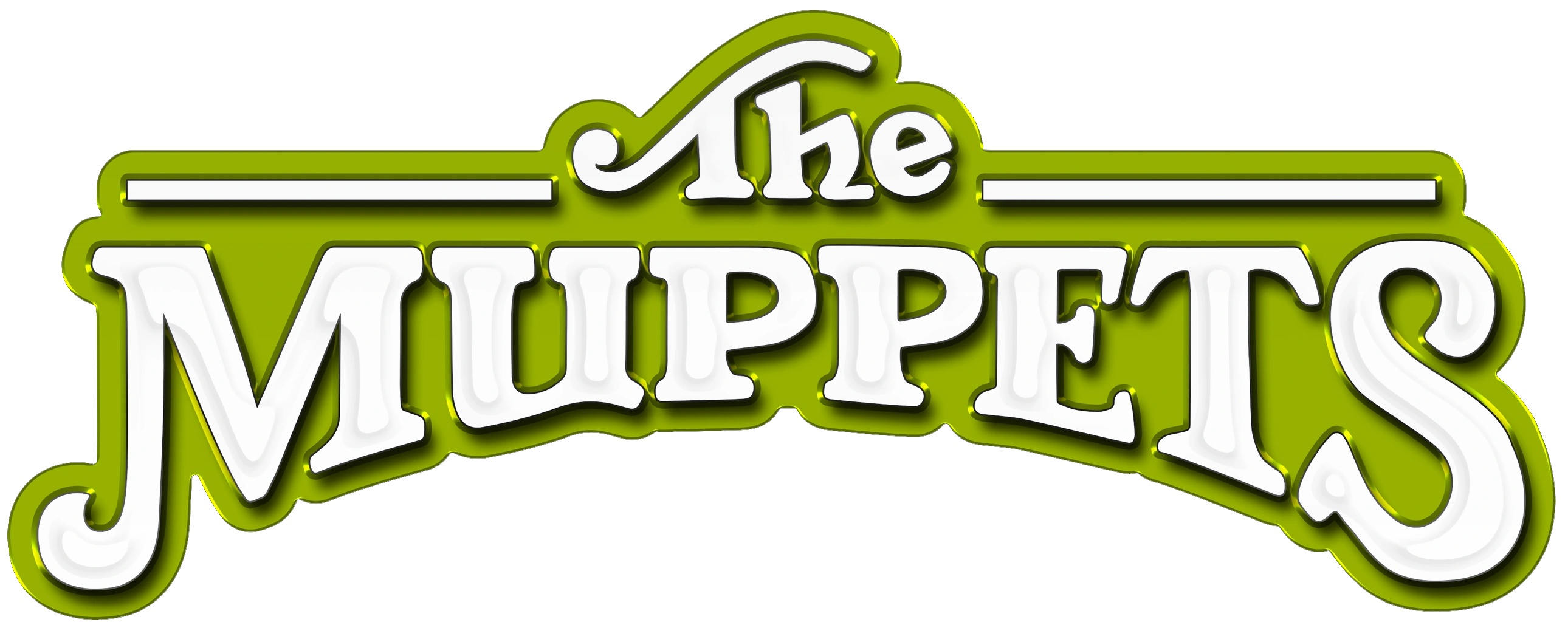
- Studio albums: 16
- Extended plays: 2
- Compilation albums: 4
- Singles: 8
- Music videos: 5
- Other appearances: 2

The discography of the Muppets, an American puppet ensemble group originally created by Jim Henson, includes of sixteen studio albums, four compilation albums, one extended play, eight singles, two "featured artist" singles and five music videos. Of the studio and compilation albums, three are soundtracks from seasons of The Muppet Show and seven of eight motion pictures. The soundtrack to the sixth film, Muppets from Space was orchestral as opposed to derivative compositions performed by the characters. Walt Disney Records has served as the primary record label for musical projects by the Muppets since 2004, and has also reissued earlier albums.

The Muppets are also known for numerous songs from their films and television series, some of which, including "Rainbow Connection", "Bein' Green", "The Muppet Show Theme", "Man or Muppet", and their rendition of "Mah Nà Mah Nà", have become acclaimed and a prevalent part of contemporary pop culture, with several adaptations from other artists of varying genres. Not all discography has been performed by the group as an ensemble cast; some characters such as Kermit the Frog, Rowlf the Dog, and Dr. Teeth and the Electric Mayhem, have gone on to perform solo compositions.

== Studio albums ==
List of studio albums, with selected chart positions, sales figures and certifications
Title	Album details	Peak chart positions								Sales	Certifications
Title	Album details	US	US Digital	US Kid Albums	US Soundtracks	AUS	NZ	UK	UK Soundtracks	Sales	Certifications
The Muppet Show	Released: May 19, 1977; Label: Arista Records / Pye Records; Formats: LP	153	—	—	—	39	8	1	—		BPI: Gold
The Muppet Show 2	Released: February 6, 1978; Label: Arista Records / Pye Records; Formats: LP	—	—	—	—	—	—	16	—		BPI: Silver
The Muppet Movie: Original Soundtrack Recording	Released: July 13, 1979; Label: Atlantic Records (later re-released by Walt Disney Records); Formats: LP, Tape, CD	32	—	—	—	31	45	—	—	US: 1,000,000 (Note: According to The Importance of Jim Henson, sales of the album reached to more than one million sales in 1980. For unknown reasons, the album was not certified Platinum by RIAA.)	RIAA: Gold; BPI: Silver
John Denver and the Muppets: A Christmas Together	Released: October 1979; Label: RCA Records (later re-released by Windstar Records and LaserLight Digital); Formats: LP, Tape, CD	26	—	—	—	—	—	—	—		RIAA: Platinum
The Great Muppet Caper: The Original Soundtrack	Released: 1981; Label: Atlantic Records; Formats: LP	66	—	—	—	—	—	—	—		
The Muppets Take Manhattan: The Original Soundtrack	Released: 1984; Label: Warner Bros. Records; Formats: LP	204 (Note: The album did not chart on Billboard 200. It peaked at No. 204 on the Bubbling Under the Top LPs.)	—	—	—	—	—	—	—		
The Muppet Christmas Carol: Original Motion Picture Soundtrack	Released: 1992; Label: Jim Henson Records (later re-released by Walt Disney Records); Formats: CD, LP	189	—	—	—	—	—	—	—		
Ol' Brown Ears Is Back	Released: April 6, 1993; Label: Jim Henson Records; Formats: CD; Artist: Rowlf the Dog	—	—	—	—	—	—	—	—		
Muppet Beach Party	Released: May 25, 1993; Label: Jim Henson Records; Formats: CD	—	—	—	—	—	—	—	—		
Kermit Unpigged	Released: September 27, 1994; Label: Jim Henson Records; Formats: CD	—	—	—	—	—	—	—	—		
The Muppet Treasure Island: Original Motion Picture Soundtrack	Released: February 6, 1996; Label: Angel Records; Formats: CD	—	—	—	—	—	—	—	—		
Muppets from Space: The Ultimate Muppet Trip	Released: July 13, 1999; Label: Sony Wonder; Formats: CD	—	—	—	—	—	—	—	—		
Muppets from Space: Original Motion Picture Score	Released: August 24, 1999; Label: Varèse Sarabande; Formats: CD	—	—	—	—	—	—	—	—		
Best of the Muppets featuring The Muppets' Wizard of Oz	Released: May 17, 2005; Label: Walt Disney Records; Formats: CD	—	—	—	—	—	—	—	—		
The Muppets: A Green and Red Christmas	Release date: October 17, 2006; Re-release date: November 1, 2011; Label: Walt Disney Records; Formats: CD, digital download	—	—	—	—	—	—	—	—		
The Muppets: Original Soundtrack	Release date: November 22, 2011; Label: Walt Disney Records; Formats: CD, digital download	38	11	—	4	57	—	—	—		
Muppets Most Wanted: Original Soundtrack	Release date: March 18, 2014; Label: Walt Disney Records; Formats: CD, digital download	68	—	—	4	—	—	—	—		
The Electric Mayhem (The Muppets Mayhem: Music From the Disney+ Original Series)	Release date: May 10, 2023; Label: Walt Disney Records; Formats: LP, digital download; Artist: Dr. Teeth and the Electric Mayhem	—	—	1	10	—	—	—	37		
"—" denotes a recording that did not chart or was not released in that territory.

== Compilation albums ==
List of studio albums, with selected chart positions, sales figures and certifications
Title	Album details	Peak chart positions					Sales	Certifications
Title	Album details	US	US Rock	US Kid Albums	US Digital	CAN	Sales	Certifications
Jim Henson's The Muppet Show Music Album	Released: 1979; Label: PYE Records; Formats: Vinyl and cassette; Released in: UK, France, Australia, Greece, Ireland, Yugoslavia, Spain, Portugal	—	—	—	—	—		
Muppet Hits	Released: 1993; Label: BMG Kidz/ Jim Henson Records; Formats: CD and cassette	—	—	—	—	—		
Muppet Hits Take 2	Released: 1994; Label: BMG Kidz/Jim Henson Records; Formats: CD and cassette	—	—	—	—	—		
The Muppet Show: Music, Mayhem and More!	Released: 2002; Label: Rhino Records; Formats: CD	—	—	—	—	—		
Muppets: The Green Album	Released: August 23, 2011; Label: Walt Disney Records; Formats: CD, Digital download; Artist: Various	8	1	1	5	14	US: 30,000	
"—" denotes a recording that did not chart or was not released in that territory.

== EPs ==
Year	Album details
2008	A Muppets Christmas: Letters to Santa (Soundtrack from the TV Special): Released: 23 November 2009; Label: Walt Disney Records; Format: Digital download
2021	Muppets Haunted Mansion (Original Soundtrack): Released: 8 October 2022; Label: Walt Disney Records; Format: Digital download

== Singles ==
Year	Single	Peak chart positions				Album
Year	Single	US	CAN	NZ	UK	Album
1977	"The Muppet Show Theme"	—	—	—	—	The Muppet Show
1977	"Halfway Down the Stairs"	—	—	—	7	The Muppet Show
1977	"Mahna Mahna"	—	—	7	—	The Muppet Show
1977	"The Muppet Show Music Hall" (EP)	—	—	—	19	
1978	"For What It's Worth"	—	—	—	—	The Muppet Show 2
1979	"Rainbow Connection"	25	—	29	—	The Muppet Movie
1979	"Movin' Right Along"	—	—	—	—	The Muppet Movie
1979	"Have Yourself a Merry Little Christmas"	—	—	—	—	John Denver and the Muppets: A Christmas Together
1979	"The Peace Carol"	—	—	—	—	John Denver and the Muppets: A Christmas Together
1981	"The First Time It Happens"	—	—	—	—	The Great Muppet Caper
2009	"Pöpcørn"	—	—	—	—	
2009	"Bohemian Rhapsody"	—	—	—	32	
2009	"I Believe" (Note: performed by Kermit and Tiffany Thornton)	—	—	—	—	
2011	"Muppet Show Theme Song" (Note: performed by OK Go)	—	14	—	—	Muppets: The Green Album
2011	"The Muppet Show Theme"	—	—	—	182	The Muppets: Original Soundtrack
2011	"Man or Muppet"	—	—	—	121	The Muppets: Original Soundtrack
"—" denotes releases that did not chart

== Music videos ==
Year	Song	Album	Label
2002	"Keep Fishin'"	Maladroit	Geffen Records
2009	"Bohemian Rhapsody"	Bohemian Rhapsody (Muppets Version)	Walt Disney Records
2009	"Pöpcørn"	Pöpcørn	Walt Disney Records
2011	"Muppet Show Theme Song"	Muppets: The Green Album	Walt Disney Records
2012	"All I Need is Love"	Cee Lo's Magic Moment	Elektra Records

== Other appearances ==
Year	Album	Song(s)	Label(s)
2009	My Christmas	"Jingle Bells"	Universal Music Group / Decca Records
2012	Cee Lo's Magic Moment	"All I Need is Love"; Credited as Disney's The Muppets	Elektra Records

== See also ==
- Sesame Street discography
- List of The Muppets productions
