= Music of Sesame Street =

Music of the television show Sesame Street

Music has been a part of the children's television show Sesame Street since its debut on PBS in 1969. For the first time, music was used as a teaching tool on a TV program for children; the songs written and performed on the show fulfilled specific purposes and supported its curriculum. The music on Sesame Street consisted of many styles and genres, but was consistent and recognizable so that it could be reproduced. The producers recorded and released dozens of albums of music; many songs became "timeless classics". In order to attract the best composers and lyricists, CTW allowed songwriters to retain the rights to the songs they wrote, which allowed them to earn lucrative profits. Sesame Street Book & Record, recorded in 1970, went gold and won a Grammy. As of November 2019, Sesame Workshop has partnered with Warner Music Group's Arts Music division to reform Sesame Street Records to make the music of Sesame Street fully available.

Sesame Street's songwriters included the show's first music director Joe Raposo, Jeff Moss, and Christopher Cerf, and scriptwriters like Tony Geiss and Norman Stiles. Raposo and his musical team created a huge amount of music for the show, including dozens of unique songs per show. Raposo was inspired by the goals of Sesame Street, especially in the early days of the show's production, and composed hundreds of curriculum-inspired songs. Raposo won three Emmys and four Grammys for his work on the show. The show's theme music, "Can You Tell Me How to Get to Sesame Street?", which has been called "a "siren song for preschoolers", was written by Raposo, director Jon Stone, and writer Bruce Hart. Raposo also wrote "Bein' Green," "Somebody Come and Play" and "C is for Cookie". "Sing" became a hit for The Carpenters in 1973. Moss wrote "I Love Trash", which was included on the first album of Sesame Street songs, and "Rubber Duckie", which was performed by the Boston Pops Orchestra and hit #11 on the US Billboard Hot 100 chart in 1971, "I Don't Want to Live on the Moon" and "People in Your Neighborhood".

Artists like Barbra Streisand, Lena Horne, Dizzy Gillespie, Paul Simon, and Jose Feliciano have recorded Raposo's Sesame Street songs. By 2021, Sesame Street had been honored with 11 Grammys.

== Purpose ==
Sesame Street, from its earliest planning and development stages before its debut on PBS in 1969, has used music as a teaching tool. The show's creators recognized that children responded to commercial jingles, so they wanted to use their characteristics, which included repetition, clever visuals, brevity, and clarity, in what they presented to young viewers. For the first time in children's television, the show's songs fulfilled a specific purpose and supported its curriculum. The show's creators understood that music and sound effects provided a direct means of teaching children basic skills, and that children learned more effectively when new material was accompanied by a song. Co-creator Joan Ganz Cooney observed in her proposal for the new show, written in 1967, that children had an "affinity for commercial jingles", so many of the show's songs were constructed like television ads. Critic Peter Hellman put it this way: "If [children] could recite Budweiser jingles from TV, why not give them a program that would teach the ABCs and simple number concepts?"

Cover art of Sesame Street Book and Record (Columbia/CBS, 1970), the first album of Sesame Street music

The music on Sesame Street consisted of many styles and genres, but it retained its own distinctive sound, which was consistent and recognizable so that it could be reproduced. "There was no other sound like it on television", Jon Stone, the show's first director, said. Music was used to encourage children's dual-attention abilities by allowing them to attend to the show's action even when not actively watching. In order to be effective, however, Gerald S. Lesser, who supervised research for Sesame Street, stated that because music and sound effects naturally evokes physical participation, they need to be carefully integrated with visual movement. As a result, the songwriters avoided pairing music with static visual presentations. Auditory cues in the form of music or sound effects signaled the entrance of a character or the end and beginning of a sequence.

The producers recorded and released its musical content early in the show's history, to reinforce its curriculum lessons for children when they were not watching it, and for entertainment. Recording albums of the substantial amount of music written for the show, along with publishing books, was the first attempts to generate income and to fund the show and other projects of the Children's Television Workshop (the CTW, later renamed the Sesame Workshop, or the SW), the organization that oversaw the production of Sesame Street.

Many of the songs written for the show have become what writer David Borgenicht called "timeless classics". In order to attract the best composers and lyricists, CTW allowed songwriters to retain the rights to the songs they wrote. For the first time in children's television, the writers earned lucrative profits, which helped the show sustain public interest. Sesame Street Book & Record, recorded in 1970, the first of dozens of albums made up of Sesame Street songs, was also the show's first cast album. The album went gold and won a Grammy. The final track "Rubber Duckie", written by Jeff Moss, was released as a single, appeared on the United States' Billboard Hot 100 chart, and was nominated for a Grammy. The Boston Pops performed with the show's cast in a television special that aired in 1971.

== Songs and songwriters ==
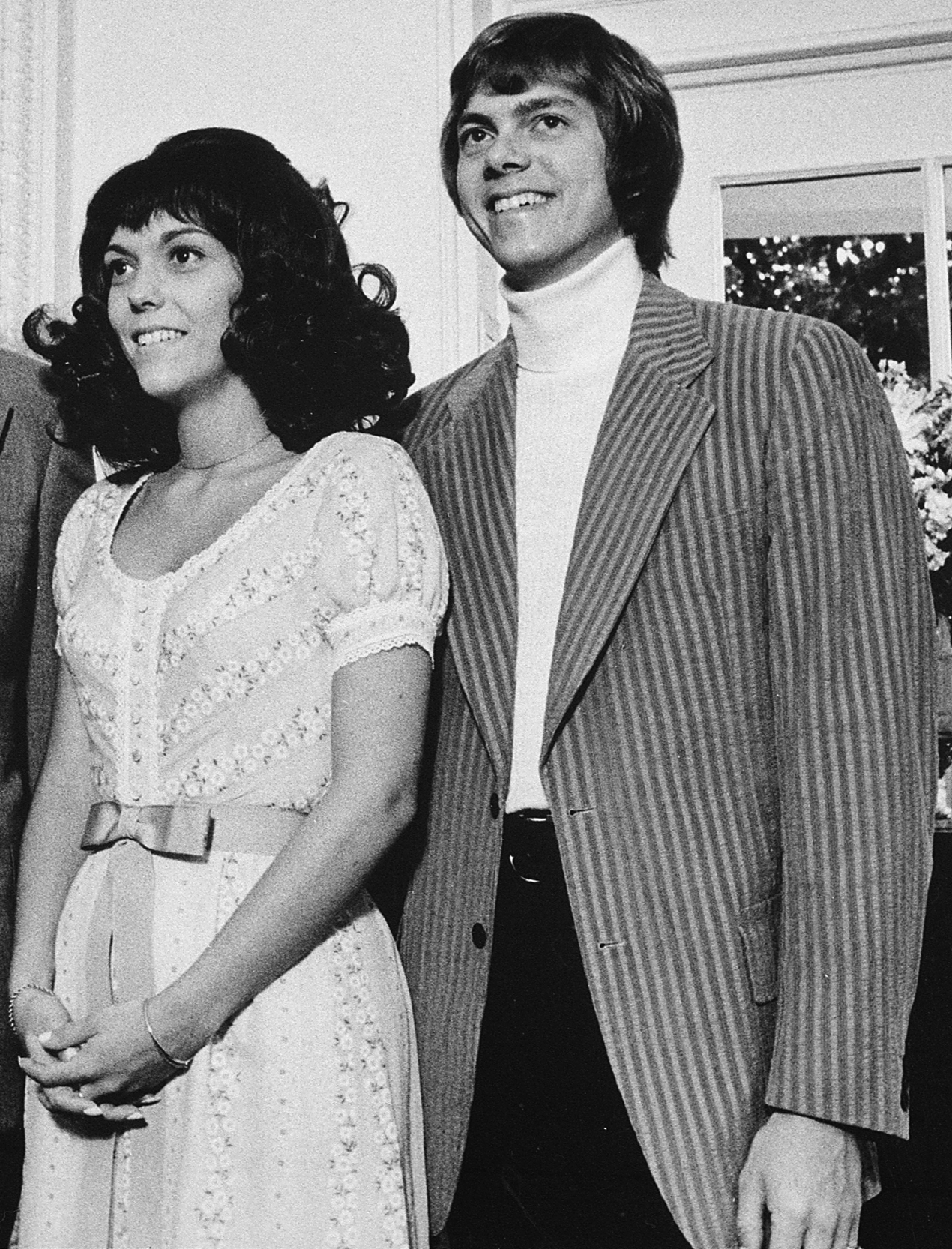
The Carpenters, one of the many artists who recorded music from Sesame Street.

Sesame Street's songwriters included the show's first music director Joe Raposo; Jeff Moss, whom Michael Davis called a "gifted poet, composer, and lyricist"; and Christopher Cerf; whom Louise Gikow called "the go-to guy on Sesame Street for classic rock and roll as well as song spoofs". Scriptwriters such as Tony Geiss, who wrote approximately 150 songs for the show, and Norman Stiles often also wrote their own lyrics to accompany their scripts.

Raposo was brought to Sesame Street by producer Tom Whedon, who was his friend and college roommate, and by Stone, who had worked with Raposo on other productions. Stone found Raposo's music brilliant, melodic, and sophisticated, yet simple enough for children to recognize and sing. According to writer Michael Davis, Sesame Street's signature sound grew out of sessions with a seven-piece band consisting of a keyboardist, drummer, electric bass player, guitarist, trumpeter, a winds instrumentalist, and a percussionist. One of these musicians was drummer Danny Epstein, who became the show's music coordinator in 1970 and performed for the show since its inception. Stone reported that a typical recording session with Raposo, which would often last three days, was "an on-the-fly, off-the-cuff experience".

Raposo and his musical team created a huge amount of music in order to accompany 130 episodes a year, which often included dozens of unique songs per show. Raposo, who wrote over 2,000 compositions for Sesame Street, called it a "sausage factory". Raposo was inspired by the goals of Sesame Street, especially in the early days of the show's production, and responded by composing, as Davis put it, "a stack" of curriculum-inspired songs. Davis also stated, "In the early days of production, nobody 'got' the gestalt of Sesame Street faster or better than Raposo". The show's researchers reported that they enjoyed working with Raposo, and he enjoyed working with them. They also reported that he would change his songs based upon the researchers' needs and suggestions, and on the goals of the show's curriculum. Raposo won three Emmys and four Grammys for his work on the show.

Raposo wrote the music to the theme music, which Davis called "jaunty" and "deceptively simple". Stone and writer Bruce Hart were listed as the song's lyricists; Stone considered the song "a musical masterpiece and a lyrical embarrassment". Epstein was responsible for bringing in jazz musician Toots Thielemans to play harmonica for the song. The song's arrangement has changed about six times, but the words have remained the same throughout the years. This became what Davis called a "siren song for preschoolers".

Epstein called Moss "a true gentleman", and Cooney called him "a true music visionary". He wrote "I Love Trash" for Oscar the Grouch, which was included on the first album of Sesame Street songs. One of Moss' best-known compositions for the show was Rubber Duckie; it was performed by Henson for the Muppet Ernie and also appeared on the album. The song was performed by the Boston Pops Orchestra and hit #11 on the US Billboard charts in 1971, and became a hit in Germany in 1996. Moss also wrote "I Don't Want to Live on the Moon" and "People in Your Neighborhood". Epstein called his music "simple" but "not simplistic". Moss co-wrote over 70 songs with Raposo.

Raposo also wrote Bein' Green in 1970, again performed by Henson, but this time for Kermit the Frog. Davis calls it "Raposo's best-regarded song for Sesame Street", and it has been recorded by several singers, including Frank Sinatra, Van Morrison and Ray Charles. Raposo's other notable songs written for the show include "Somebody Come and Play" and "C is for Cookie". "Sing", which Epstein called "a monument", became a hit for The Carpenters in 1973. Barbra Streisand, Lena Horne, Dizzy Gillespie, Paul Simon, and Jose Feliciano also recorded Raposo's Sesame Street songs.

By 2019, 180 albums had been produced, and Sesame Street had been honored with 11 Grammys. In 2010, Time Magazine compiled a list of the Top Ten celebrity songs to be featured on the show. The list included older artists such as Smokey Robinson, Johnny Cash and Cab Calloway as well as newer performers like Norah Jones and Feist. In late 2018, SW announced a multi-year agreement with Warner Music Group's Arts Music division to re-launch Sesame Street Records in the U.S. and Canada. For the first time in 20 years, "an extensive catalog of Sesame Street recordings" was made available to the public in a variety of formats, including CD and vinyl compilations, digital streaming, and downloads.

== Sesame Street Records ==
Sesame Street Records
- Product type: Music
- Current owner: Sesame Workshop; Arts Music
- Introduced: 1974
- Markets: North America

Sesame Street Records is a label of Sesame Workshop, distributed by Arts Music, that was revived in 2019. The label existed previously from 1974 to 1984 as an independent label.

Children's Television Workshop (CTW; now Sesame Workshop) started releasing Sesame Street albums in 1970. Sesame Street Records label started in 1974. The label was discounted in 1984. CTW continued issuing Sesame Street music in partnership with labels including parody-titles like Sesame Road and Born to Add, which spoofed Abbey Road and Born to Run.

Sesame Street Records in the U.S. and Canada was relaunched in November 2019 via a multi-year agreement with Warner Music Group's Arts Music division. The full catalog of Sesame Street recordings would be fully available for the first time in 20 years in various formats. The catalog was released via streaming and download platform at the time of the announcement. The first releases in 2019 were the Letters series on September 21 then All-Time Favorites series followed in November with a new holiday compilation. The label plans to origin cover songs and parodies outside the series and thematic compilations around the show's various topics.

== See also ==
- List of songs from Sesame Street
- Sesame Street discography

== Works cited ==
- Borgenicht, David (1998). Sesame Street Unpaved. New York: Hyperion Publishing. ISBN 0-7868-6460-5
- Davis, Michael (2008). Street Gang: The Complete History of Sesame Street. New York: Viking/Penguin. ISBN 978-0-670-01996-0
- Gikow, Louise A. (2009). Sesame Street: A Celebration— Forty Years of Life on the Street. New York: Black Dog & Leventhal Publishers. ISBN 978-1-57912-638-4.
- Lesser, Gerald S. (1974). Children and Television: Lessons From Sesame Street. New York: Vintage/Knopf/Random House Books. ISBN 0-394-71448-2
