= Sesame Street discography =

This is a list of recordings released by the TV series Sesame Street. Many of the early Columbia and CTW (Children's Television Workshop) releases have been re-released on the Sony Wonder label, and later by The Orchard and Warner Music Group.

== 1970s ==
- 1970 - The Sesame Street Book & Record: Original Cast (a.k.a. Sesame Street 1) (Columbia CS 1069) / 1974 (CTW 22064) (US #23, 54 weeks)
- 1970 - The Sesame Street Carry About Box Set (Columbia) / (CRA)
- 1970 - Susan Sings Songs From Sesame Street (Scepter SPS-584) (US #86, 13 weeks)
- 1970 - Bob McGrath from Sesame Street (Affinity 1001) (US #126, 11 weeks)
- 1971 - Sesame Street 2 - Original Cast (Warner Bros. BS 2569) / 1975 (CTW 22074) (US #78, 10 weeks)
- 1971 - The Muppet Alphabet Album (Columbia CC 25503) / 1996 - Sing The Alphabet (Sony Wonder 67747-67748) / 2008 (Koch Records)
- 1971 - The Muppet Alphabet Album Carry About (CRA) / 1990 - The Sesame Street Alphabet Album (Golden)
- 1971 - The Year of Roosevelt Franklin a.k.a. My Name is Roosevelt Franklin (Columbia C 30387) / 1974 (CTW 22067)
- 1972 - Havin' Fun With Ernie and Bert (Columbia CC 25506)
- 1972 - Havin' Fun With Ernie and Bert Carry About (CRA)
- 1973 - Sesame Street Concert/On Stage - Live! (Columbia KC 32343) / 1975 (CTW 22075)
- 1974 - Bert's Blockbusters (CTW 22051)
- 1974 - Letters ...and Numbers, Too! (CTW 22055)
- 1974 - Ernie's Hits (CTW 22056)
- 1974 - Sing the Hit Songs of Sesame Street (CTW 22057)
- 1974 - "C" Is For Cookie (CTW 22058) / 1995 - "C" is for Cookie: Cookie's Favorite Songs (Sony Wonder)
- 1974 - Big Bird Sings (CTW 22059)
- 1974 - Somebody Come and Play a.k.a. Play-Along Songs (CTW 22060)
- 1974 - Let a Frown Be Your Umbrella (CTW 22061)
- 1974 - Pete Seeger and Brother Kirk Visit Sesame Street (CTW 22062)
- 1974 - Grover Sings The Blues (CTW 22066)
- 1974 - Sesame Mucho! (CRA 25507) / 1979 - Welcome! (CTW 22091)
- 1974 - Bob McGrath Sings For All The Boys and Girls
- 1975 - Bert & Ernie Sing-Along (CTW 22068)
- 1975 - The Count Counts! (CTW 22069)
- 1975 - Sesame Street Monsters! (CTW 22071) / 1996 - Monster Melodies (Sony Wonder)
- 1975 - Merry Christmas from Sesame Street (CTW 25516) / 1995 - A Sesame Street Christmas (Sony Wonder) / 2008 (Koch Records)
- 1976 - Just Friends (CTW)
- 1976 - Letters ABCD (CRA) / (CTW)
- 1976 - Letters EFGH (CRA) / (CTW)
- 1976 - Letters IJKL (CRA) / (CTW)
- 1976 - Letters MNOP (CRA) / (CTW)
- 1976 - Letters QRST (CRA) / (CTW)
- 1976 - Letters UVW (CRA) / (CTW)
- 1976 - Letters XYZ (CRA) / (CTW)
- 1977 - Let Your Feelings Show! (CTW 22076)
- 1977 - Signs! (CTW 22077)
- 1977 - Happy Birthday from Sesame Street (CTW 22078) / 1992 (Golden) / 2004 (Sony Wonder)
- 1977 - Numbers! (CTW 22079) / 1995 (Sony Wonder)
- 1977 - Letters, Numbers and Signs 3-LP Box Set (CTW 160)
- 1977 - Big Bird Leads The Band (CTW 22080)
- 1977 - The Sesame Street Fairy Tale Album (CTW 22081)
- 1977 - Sleepytime Bird (CTW 22082) / 1990 - Sleepytime on Sesame Street (Golden)
- 1977 - Aren't You Glad You're You? (CTW 22083)
- 1977 - Bob Sings! (CTW 22084)
- 1977 - What Time Is It On Sesame Street? (CTW 25517)
- 1977 - Sesame Street Gold! (CTW 79001)
- 1978 - Sesame Street Story Time (CTW 22086)
- 1978 - On The Street Where We Live - Block Party! (CTW 22087)
- 1978 - David: Daydreamin' On A Rainy Day (CTW 25518)
- 1978 - Fair Is Fair (CTW 22088)
- 1978 - Sing, Sang Song Singalong (CTW 25520)
- 1978 - Sesame Street Silver - 10th Anniversary Album (CTW 79002)
- 1978 - Sesame Street Fever soundtrack (CTW)
- 1979 - At Home With Ernie and Bert (CTW)
- 1979 - Every Body's Record (CTW)
- 1979 - Anne Murray Sings for the Sesame Street Generation (CTW)
- 1979 - The Stars Come Out On Sesame Street (CTW)
- 1979 - Sesame Disco (CTW)
- 1979 - Dinah! Pays a Visit to Sesame Street—I've Got A Song (CTW)

== 1980s ==
- 1980 - In Harmony: A Sesame Street Record (Warner Bros) (US #156)
- 1980 - The People in Your Neighborhood (CTW)
- 1980 - Big Bird's Birdtime Stories (CTW)
- 1980 - Christmas Eve on Sesame Street (CTW)
- 1980 - Love (CTW)
- 1980 - Sesame Street Treasury (Columbia House)
- 1981 - Bert & Ernie Side By Side (Golden)
- 1981 - Camping in Canada
- 1981 - Getting Ready For School (CTW)
- 1981 - Sesame Country (CTW)
- 1981 - Big Bird Discovers the Orchestra (CTW)
- 1981 - Grin and Giggle With Big Bird (CTW)
- 1981 - Sesame Count (CTW) / 1992 (Golden)
- 1982 - Big Bird Presents Hans Christian Andersen
- 1982 - For The First Time
- 1982 - Exercise! (CTW)
- 1982 - Just Friends
- 1982 - Just the Two of Us
- 1982 - Sesame Street Sing-Along! (CTW) / 1993 - A Sesame Street Sing-Along (Golden)
- 1983 - Surprise!
- 1983 - The Gang's All Here
- 1983 - Born To Add: Great Rock & Roll (CTW) / 1993 (Golden) / 1995 (Sony Wonder)
- 1983 - The Best of Big Bird (Golden)
- 1983 - The Best of Ernie (Golden)
- 1983 - The Best of Bert (Golden)
- 1983 - The Best of Grover (Golden)
- 1983 - The Best of Cookie Monster (Golden)
- 1983 - The Best of Oscar the Grouch (Golden)
- 1983 - The Best of The Count (Golden)
- 1984 - Sesame Street Christmas Sing-Along (CTW) / 1993 - Merry Christmas: A Sesame Street Sing-Along (Golden)
- 1985 - Sesame Street Presents Follow That Bird Soundtrack (RCA)
- 1986 - Bounce Along with Big Bird (Golden) / 1996 (Sony)
- 1986 - Christmas on Sesame Street (CBS)
- 1987 - The Best of Sesame Street (Sight & Sound)

== 1990s ==
- 1990 - Put Down the Duckie! (Golden)
- 1991 - Bob's Favorite Street Songs (A&M)
- 1991 - Jim Henson: A Sesame Street Celebration (Golden)
- 1992 - Sing: Songs of Joe Raposo (Golden)
- 1993 - Sesame Road (Golden) / 1995 (Sony Wonder)
- 1993 - We Are All Earthlings (Golden)
- 1994 - Sesame Street Celebrates! (Golden)
- 1994 - Cheep Thrills (Golden)
- 1995 - Sesame Street Platinum: All-Time Favorites (Sony Wonder) / 2008 (Koch Records)
- 1995 - The Bird is the Word! Big Bird's Favorite Songs (Sony Wonder)
- 1995 - Splish Splash: Bath Time Fun (Sony Wonder)
- 1996 - Bert and Ernie's Greatest Hits (Sony Wonder)
- 1996 - Big Bird's Band Plays Together (Sony Wonder)
- 1996 - Rosita's Block Party (Sony Wonder)
- 1996 - Sing-Along Travel Songs (Sony Wonder)
- 1996 - Silly Songs (Sony Wonder) / 2009 (Koch Records)
- 1996 - Dreamytime Songs (Sony Wonder)
- 1997 - Hot! Hot! Hot! Dance Songs (Sony Wonder) / 2008 (Koch Records)
- 1997 - Sesame Street Platinum Too (Sony Wonder)
- 1997 - The Count's Countdown (Sony Wonder)
- 1997 - Oscar's Trashy Songs (Sony Wonder)
- 1997 - The Best Of Elmo (Sony Wonder) / 2008 (Koch Records)
- 1997 - Elmo's Favorite Sing-Alongs (Sony Wonder)
- 1997 - Kids' Favorite Songs (Sony Wonder) / 2008 (Koch Records)
- 1998 - Fiesta Songs! (Sony Wonder)
- 1998 - Elmopalooza! (Sony Wonder) / 2008 (Koch Records)
- 1998 - Elmo's Lowdown Hoedown (Sony Wonder)
- 1998 - Elmo Saves Christmas (Sony Wonder) / 2008 (Koch Records)
- 1998 - Elmo Says BOO! (Sony Wonder)
- 1999 - The Adventures of Elmo in Grouchland (Sony Wonder)

== 2000s ==
- 2000 - CinderElmo (Sony Wonder)
- 2001 - Elmo & the Orchestra (Sony Wonder)
- 2001 - Kids' Favorite Songs 2 (Sony Wonder)
- 2003 - Songs from the Street: 35 Years of Music (Sony Wonder)

== 2010s ==
- 2010 - Sesame Street Old School Volume 1 (Koch Records)
- 2010 - Sesame Street Old School Volume 2 (Koch Records)
- 2011 - Sesame Street Music: Amazon Sampler (Amazon.com/Sesame Workshop)
- 2011 - Sesame Street Christmas Collection (Sesame Workshop)
- 2012 - Sesame Street Valentine's Collection (Sesame Workshop)
- 2012 - A Special Sesame Street Christmas: Soundtrack from the Emmy Nmminated Special (Legend Group Records)
- 2012 - Elmo's Dance Party (Sesame Workshop)
- 2012 - Sunny Days Collection (Sesame Workshop)
- 2012 - Travel Songs (Sesame Workshop)
- 2012 - Summer Games Collection (Sesame Workshop)
- 2012 - Back to School Collection
- 2012 - Halloween Collection
- 2012 - Giving Thanks Collection
- 2013 - Holiday Classics
- 2014 - V is for Valentine
- 2014 - Lyrical Letters
- 2015 - Keep Christmas with You (Mormon Tabernacle Choir)

== Unreleased 1974 Sesame Street record albums ==
- Bob and Susan Sing Songs from Sesame Street
- Tu Me Gustas (I Like You)
- Sesame Street Zoo

== See also ==
- The Muppets discography
