= Sesame Street Fever =

Disco album featuring the characters of Sesame Street

Soundtrack album and concept album by Sesame Street and Robin Gibb
- Released: August 1978
- Recorded: May 1978
- Studios: CBS 30th Street, New York City; Mediasound, New York City
- Genres: Disco, Children's music
- Length: 32:02
- Label: Children's Television Workshop
- Producer: Joe Raposo

Sesame Street Fever is a concept album made by the cast of Sesame Street in 1978. It follows the characters as a love of disco sweeps Sesame Street.

The album heavily parodies Saturday Night Fever, and the cover features Grover in the place of John Travolta, and Ernie, Bert, and Cookie Monster in the place of the Bee Gees.

Bee Gee Robin Gibb also appears on the album, and according to the LP's liner notes, "appears courtesy of his children Melissa and Spencer Gibb".

The recording was released in the LP, cassette, and eight-track audio formats; it has never been commercially released on compact disc (except for a 1991 Japanese re-release) but is available to download on Amazon, iTunes and file sharing sites. Singles of "Sesame Street Fever"/"Trash" and "Doin' the Pigeon"/"Rubber Duckie" were released as promotional items.

A follow-up album, Sesame Disco! was released in 1979.

== Track listing ==
All songs were written by Joe Raposo:

1. "Sesame Street Fever" by Robin Gibb, Bert, Count von Count, Big Bird, Ernie, Cookie Monster
2. "Doin' The Pigeon" - Bert & The Girls (preceded by a short hidden track that features Bert and Ernie debating the dance craze)
3. "Rubber Duckie" - Ernie & His Rubber Duckie
4. "Trash" - Robin Gibb
5. "C Is For Cookie" - Cookie Monster & The Girls (preceded by a conversation between Cookie Monster and Robin Gibb)
6. "Has Anybody Seen My Dog?" - Marty & Grover (Cookie Monster makes a brief cameo.)
- Both "Doin' The Pigeon" and "Has Anybody Seen My Dog?" have overextended instrumental outros (the former's is broken up with one more singing of the chorus by the girls), possibly to help pad the album's sides.

== Personnel ==
- Robin Gibb – vocals
- Frank Oz – vocals
- Jerry Nelson – vocals
- Caroll Spinney – vocals
- Jim Henson – vocals
- Maeretha Stewart – vocals
- Ullanda McCullough – vocals
- Yvonne Lewis – vocals
- Jack Cavari – guitar
- Jeff Layton – guitar
- Cliff Morris – guitar
- Herb Bushler – bass guitar
- Richard Crooks – drums
- David Horowitz – keyboards
- Pat Rebillot – keyboards
- George Devons – percussion
- Jimmy Maelen – conga
- Joe Shepley – trumpet
- Alan Raph – trombone
- Lou Marini – single-reed instruments
- Dave Tofani – baritone saxophone
- Paul Gershman – strings
- Harold Kohon – strings
- Joe Malin – strings
- Gene Orloff – strings
- Matt Raimondi – strings
- Gerald Tarack – strings
- Jesse Levy – cello
- Kermit Moore – cello
- Michael DeLugg - engineer

== Chart performance ==
The album ended up being a surprise commercial success both in terms of chart performance and sales. It peaked at #75 on Billboard's Pop Albums Chart, and was certified Gold by the RIAA.

== See also ==
- Sesame Street discography
