= Kermit Unpigged =

1994 The Muppets album

Studio album by The Muppets
- Released: September 27, 1994
- Recorded: 1993–1994
- Genre: Comedy
- Length: 37:38
- Label: Jim Henson Records, BMG Kidz
- Producer: Robert Kraft; John Boylan

The Muppets chronology
Muppet Beach Party (1993)	Kermit Unpigged (1994)	Muppet Treasure Island: Original Soundtrack (1996)

Professional ratings
Review scores
Source	Rating
AllMusic	4.5/5 stars
Music Week	3/5 stars

Kermit Unpigged is a comedy album released by The Jim Henson Company through BMG Kidz in 1994, and the last album released by Jim Henson Records. The record's title is a parody of the MTV series MTV Unplugged, and the cover is a parody of Eric Clapton's Unplugged album cover as well. The album consists of Kermit the Frog and the other Muppets getting lost at a recording studio and encountering celebrities including Linda Ronstadt, with whom Kermit sings "All I Have to Do Is Dream", Vince Gill who sings "Daydream" with Kermit, Jimmy Buffett who sings "Mr. Spaceman" with Gonzo, and Ozzy Osbourne with whom Miss Piggy sings "Born to Be Wild". The album ends with the Muppets meeting back up and singing The Beatles song "All Together Now". Comedian Lily Tomlin also makes appearances as her character Ernestine.

The album reached #20 on Billboard's Top Kid Audio chart.

"Daydream" reached number 65 on the Canadian Country charts.

== Track listing ==
No.	Title	Writer(s)	Length
1.	"She Drives Me Crazy" (Kermit the Frog and Miss Piggy)	Roland Gift; David Steele	4:54
2.	"Daydream" (Vince Gill and Kermit the Frog)	John Sebastian	3:05
3.	"On Broadway" (George Benson, Clifford and the Rhythm Rats)	Barry Mann; Cynthia Weil; Jerry Leiber; Mike Stoller	4:16
4.	"All I Have to Do Is Dream" (Linda Ronstadt and Kermit the Frog)	Boudleaux Bryant	4:05
5.	"Born to Be Wild" (Ozzy Osbourne and Miss Piggy)	Mars Bonfire	3:28
6.	"Mr. Spaceman" (Jimmy Buffett, The Great Gonzo and Rizzo the Rat)	Roger McGuinn	2:56
7.	"Bein' Green" (Don Henley and Kermit the Frog)	Joe Raposo	3:54
8.	"Wild Thing" (Animal, Floyd Pepper and Kermit the Frog)	Chip Taylor	3:54
9.	"Can't Get Along Without You" (Kermit the Frog and Robin)	Robert Kraft; John Boylan	3:38
10.	"All Together Now" (The Muppets with Harry Smith)	John Lennon; Paul McCartney	3:18

== Personnel ==
The Muppet performers

- Kevin Clash – Clifford
- Dave Goelz – The Great Gonzo, Bunsen Honeydew
- Jerry Nelson – Robin, Floyd Pepper
- Steve Whitmire – Kermit the Frog, Rizzo the Rat, Beaker
- Frank Oz – Miss Piggy, Fozzie Bear, Animal

Musicians

- Bill Barretta
- Gerry Beckley
- Michael Botts
- John Boylan
- Nick Brown
- Michael Bruno
- John Capek
- Jennifer Condos
- Tim Drury
- Kevin Dukes
- Bruce Gaitsch
- Bob Glaub
- Andrew Gold
- Armand Grimaldi
- Warren Ham
- Robert Kraft
- Gary Mallaber
- Gunnar Nelson
- Matthew Nelson
- Doug Norwine
- Sid Page
- Alan Pasqua
- Scott Plunkett
- Michael Ronstadt
- Frank Simes
- Neil Stubenhaus
- David Lawrence – string arrangements

Technical personnel

- Robert Kraft – producer
- John Boylan – producer
- Guy DeFazio – engineer, mixing
- Dave Schiffman – assistant engineer
- Paul Grupp – mixing
- Roland Alvarez – assistant engineer
- Ric Wilson – mastering
- Lisa Bauman – production coordinator
- Teri Weigel – production coordinator
