= Ol' Brown Ears Is Back =

1993 album by Rowlf the Dog

Studio album by Rowlf the Dog
- Released: April 6, 1993
- Recorded: January 1984
- Genre: Pop; comedy
- Length: 27:37
- Label: Jim Henson Records; BMG Kidz
- Producer: Jim Henson; Robert Kraft

The Muppets chronology
The Muppet Christmas Carol: Original Soundtrack (1992)	Ol' Brown Ears Is Back (1993)	Muppet Beach Party (1994)

Ol' Brown Ears Is Back is an album released by The Jim Henson Company through BMG Kidz in 1993. The album consists of 14 songs recorded by American puppeteer Jim Henson as the Muppet character Rowlf the Dog. Although released three years after Henson's death, the tracks were recorded in 1984. It was released in CD and cassette form, with the latter including a poster.

The album's title is a reference to Frank Sinatra's 1973 album Ol' Blue Eyes Is Back.

== Songs ==
Ol' Brown Ears Is Back features Jim Henson performing songs as Muppet Rowlf the Dog. The tracks include "Lydia the Tattooed Lady", a song composed by Harold Arlen and Yip Harburg that first appeared in the 1939 film At the Circus, in which it was performed by Groucho Marx; "Eight Little Notes", a song that includes a rendition of "Für Elise" by Ludwig van Beethoven; "Halfway Down the Stairs" and "Cottleston Pie" by author A. A. Milne, the latter originally appearing as a poem in Milne's Winnie-the-Pooh stories; "Bein' Green", originally performed by Henson as Kermit the Frog on The Muppet Show; and "New York State of Mind" by Billy Joel.

== Reception ==
Lynne Heffley of the Los Angeles Times reviewed the album positively, calling it "a treasure for Henson fans and a family listening treat."

== Track listing ==
No.	Title	Writer(s)	Length
1.	"Lydia, the Tattooed Lady"	Harold Arlen, Yip Harburg	2:08
2.	"Eight Little Notes"	Larry Grossman, Hal Hackady, Ludwig van Beethoven	2:25
3.	"I Never Harmed an Onion"	Alan L. Grey, Ginger Joan Grey, Moe Jaffe	1:26
4.	"Halfway Down the Stairs"	A. A. Milne, Harold Fraser-Simson	2:53
5.	"Memory Lane"	Abe Burrows	1:32
6.	"Cottleston Pie"	A. A. Milne	1:38
7.	"Bein' Green"	Joe Raposo	2:27
8.	"Carbon Paper"	Abe Burrows	1:40
9.	"Garden Song"	David Mallett	2:47
10.	"New York State of Mind"	Billy Joel	2:41
11.	"When"	Abe Burrows	1:22
12.	"You and I and George"	Red Kelly	1:36
13.	"Wishing Song"	Paul Tracey	2:02
14.	"Old Dog Trey"	Walt Kelly	2:27

== Personnel ==
- Rowlf the Dog – primary artist
  - Jim Henson – piano, producer, vocals
- Derek Scott – piano
- Chris Boardman – arranger, associate producer, conductor
- Robert Kraft – producer
- Sandy De Crescent – orchestra contractor
- Nancy Fogarty – editing, music editor
- Larry Grossman – creative consultant
- Dave Collins – mastering
- Dave Hunt – engineer
- Dennis Sands – engineer, mixing
- Tom Hardisty – assistant engineer
- Brandon Harris – assistant engineer
- Charles Paakkari – assistant engineer
- Jonathan Rutley – assistant engineer
- Theo Panagopoulos – art direction
- Corey Edmonds Millen – design
- John Barrett – photography
