= Merry Christmas from Sesame Street =

1975 album by Sesame Street

Studio album and christmas album by Sesame Street cast
- Released: 1975
- Genre: Children
- Label: Children's Records of America
- Producer: Jon Stone

Professional ratings
Review scores
Source	Rating
The Harvard Crimson (Eric B. Fried; Susie Spring)	(favorable)

Merry Christmas from Sesame Street is a children's Christmas album featuring characters from Sesame Street and released in 1975 by the Children's Television Workshop and Children's Records of America (#CTW 25516). The album was nominated for the 1976 Grammy Awards, but lost to another Sesame Street album, Bert & Ernie Sing-Along.

Some of the songs and stories were used in the special, Christmas Eve on Sesame Street, three years later. The album was partially re-released in 1995 as A Sesame Street Christmas, although some of the tracks were altered to remove characters who were no longer on the show, and replace them with newer characters.

== Cast ==
- Northern Calloway as David
- Emilio Delgado as Luis
- Will Lee as Mr. Hooper
- Loretta Long as Susan, Smart Tina
- Sonia Manzano as Maria
- Bob McGrath as Bob
- Roscoe Orman as Gordon, Hardhead Henry Harris
- Caroll Spinney as Big Bird, Oscar the Grouch
- Frank Oz as Cookie Monster, Grover, Bert
- Jerry Nelson as The Count, Herry Monster, Snuffle-upagus
- Fran Brill as Prairie Dawn
- Jim Henson as Ernie

== Album ==
No.	Title	Performers	Length
1.	"Sesame Street Christmas Overture" (Instrumental)	The Sesame Street Festival Orchestra	—arr—
2.	"We Wish You a Merry Christmas" (traditional, arr. Sam Pottle, special lyrics: David Axelrod)	Sesame Street Cast
3.	"Deck the Halls Medley (Deck the Halls; Jingle Bells; White Christmas; Winter Wonderland" (trad.; trad.; Irving Berlin; Bernard - Smith)	Sesame Street Cast
4.	"I Hate Christmas" (Axelrod - Pottle)	Oscar
5.	"A Christmas Story" (Joseph A. Bailey)	Mr. Hooper; Ernie; Bert
6.	"Have Yourself a Merry Little Christmas" (Martin - Blane)	Bert and Ernie
7.	"The Twelve Days of Christmas" (traditional)	Sesame Street cast
8.	"It's Beginning to Look a Lot Like Christmas Medley (It's Beginning to Look a Lot Like Christmas; Silver Bells; The Christmas Song; Santa Claus Is Comin' to Town" (Meredith Willson; Livingston - Evans; Torme - Wells; Gillespie - Coots)	Big Bird; Susan and Gordon; Bob; Grover
9.	"The Night Before Christmas on Sesame Street" (Axelrod - Pottle)	David
10.	"Saludo" (traditional)	Maria and Luis
11.	"Arrurru Song" (traditional)	Maria and Luis
12.	"All I Want for Christmas Is My Two Front Teeth" (Don Gardner)	The Count
13.	"A Christmas Pageant" (Jon Stone - Sam Pottle)	Bert; Ernie; Prairie Dawn; Herry; Grover; Cookie Monster
14.	"Keep Christmas with You" (Axelrod - Pottle)	Susan; Gordon; Big Bird; Luis; David; Bob; Prairie Dawn; Ernie
15.	"We Wish You a Merry Christmas (Reprise)" (trad.)	Sesame Street Cast
Total length:			—arr—
