= The Muppet Show (album) =

1977 soundtrack album

Soundtrack album by the Muppets
- Released: May 19, 1977
- Recorded: 1976–1977
- Genre: Soundtrack
- Label: Pye, Arista (USA)
- Producer: Jack Burns

The Muppets chronology
The Muppet Show (1977)	The Muppet Show 2 (1978)

Professional ratings
Review scores
Source	Rating
AllMusic	4.5/5 stars

The Muppet Show is the first soundtrack album released from the TV show of the same name. It reached number one in the UK Albums Chart in the week ending 25 June 1977. In 1979, the album won The Grammy Award for Best Album for Children.

== Overview ==
The album includes selected songs from Season 1 of the Muppet Show as well as comedy sketches and various unlisted short skits, including interjections by Muppet characters Statler and Waldorf.

== Reception ==
In its posthumous review, Allmusic found the album "a lost treasure with all those Jim Henson characters brimming with life. Even without the visuals, this LP has all the trappings of their successful variety show of the late '70s, when the Muppets were at the height of their popularity."

== Track listing ==
Side A

1. "The Muppet Show Theme" (Henson, Pottle)
2. "Mississippi Mud" (Barris, Cavanaugh)
3. "Mahna Mahna" (Umiliani)
4. "The Great Gonzo Eats a Rubber Tyre to the Flight of the Bumblebee" (R. Korsakov)
5. "Mr. Bass Man" (J. Cymbal)
6. "Cottleston Pie" (A. A. Milne, Haynie)
7. "The Amazing Marvin Suggs and His Muppaphone Play Lady of Spain" (D. Scott / E. Reaves, T. Evans)
8. ”Pachalafaka” (I. Taylor)
9. "Lydia the Tattooed Lady" (Harburg, Arlen)
10. "Halfway Down the Stairs" (A. A. Milne, F. Simson)

Side B

1. "Tenderly" (Lawrence, Gross)
2. "I'm in Love with a Big Blue Frog" (Braunstein)
3. "Tit Willow" (Gilbert, Sullivan)
4. "Veterinarian Hospital – Soap Opera" (D. Scott)
5. "Simon Smith and His Amazing Dancing Bear" (Newman)
6. "What Now My Love" (Delanoe, Becaud, Sigman)
7. "A Monologue by Fozzie Bear" (D. Scott)
8. ”Hugga Wugga” (Henson, Raposo)
9. "Trees" (Kilmer, Rasbach)
10. "Sax and Violence" (Henson)
11. "Bein' Green" (J. Raposo)

(Writer credits from original 1977 UK vinyl release)

== Muppet performers ==
- Jim Henson as Kermit the Frog, Dr. Teeth, Rowlf the Dog, Swedish Chef, Waldorf, and The Newsman
- Frank Oz as Fozzie Bear, Miss Piggy, Animal, Sam the Eagle, and Marvin Suggs
- Jerry Nelson as Floyd Pepper, Robin the Frog, Country Trio, and Uncle Deadly
- Richard Hunt as Scooter, Sweetums, Statler, Wayne, and Mildred
- Dave Goelz as Gonzo, Zoot, Bunsen Honeydew, and Muppy
- Eren Ozker as Hilda, Wanda, and Janice
- John Lovelady as Crazy Harry and Nigel
- Fran Brill as Mary Louise

== Charts ==
=== Weekly charts ===
Chart (1977)	Peak position
Australian Albums (Kent Music Report)	39
New Zealand Albums (RMNZ)	8
UK Albums (OCC)	1

=== Year-end charts ===
Chart (1977)	Position
UK Albums (OCC)	22

== Certifications ==
Region	Certification	Certified units/sales
United Kingdom (BPI)	Gold	100,000^{^}
^{^} Shipments figures based on certification alone.
