= The Muppet Alphabet Album =

The Muppet Alphabet Album (The Sesame Street Alphabet Album)

Studio album by Sesame Street
- Released: 1971
- Recorded: 1971
- Genre: Children's
- Label: Columbia
- Producer: Jim Henson, Joe Raposo, Jeff Moss, Jerry Juhl

The Muppet Alphabet Album is an educational album based on the children's television series Sesame Street. It was first released in 1971 by Columbia, then reissued in 1976. Afterwards, it was reissued by Golden Music in 1990, followed by Sony Wonder in 1996, and by Koch Records in 2008. The latest reissues rename the album to Sing the Alphabet, and include Elmo singing a rendition of the song "ABC-DEF-GHI" in place of the original opening. The album features one song or sketch for each letter in the alphabet, performed by a variety of Sesame Street characters from the time. Each of the songs utilizes a different musical style.

Jim Henson, one of the album's producers, included a short description of the project on the album jacket of the initial release: "The idea is very simple – a little song or skit about each of the twenty-six letters of the alphabet..". A short history of the production process was later posted to a posthumous blog representing his estate.

For the third season of Sesame Street, multiple tracks from the album were adapted as segments for the show, with the Muppet characters lip-syncing to the original audio.

== Side A ==
1. "ABC-DEF-GHI" - Elmo* (Sing the Alphabet reissues only)
2. "The Opening" (pre-Sing the Alphabet releases only)
3. "The Sound of the Letter A" - Big Bird*
4. "Oscar's B Sandwich" - Oscar the Grouch (and Farley)
5. "C is for Cookie" - Cookie Monster*
6. "Dee, Dee, Dee" - Ernie*
7. "E - What's My Letter" - Guy Smiley and Prairie Dawn*
8. "Four Furry Friends" - Grover, Herry Monster, Oscar the Grouch and Cookie Monster
9. "Two G Sounds", with Grover and George*
10. "Hee Hee Ha Ha", - Harvey Kneeslapper, Herry Monster and Big Bird
11. "I Stand Up Straight and Tall" - Grover*
12. "J Friends", with the Anything Muppets*
13. "K - Herbert's Silly Poem" - Herbert Birdsfoot
14. "La La La", with Bert and Ernie*
15. "M-M-M Monster Meal", with Cookie Monster and Herry Monster*
16. "The Noodle Story" - Big Bird and Oscar the Grouch

An asterisk indicates a track that was performed on the Sesame Street series.

== Side B ==
1. "Would You Like to Buy an O?" - Ernie and Lefty the Salesman*
2. "P - My Favorite Letter" - Anything Muppets*
3. "The Question Song" - Grover and Little Girl*
4. "The R Machine" - Bert and Ernie
5. "Sammy the Snake" - Sammy the Snake*
6. "The Tale of Tom Tattertall Tuttletut" - Herbert Birdsfoot and the Anything Muppets
7. "U Lecture" - Professor Hastings (and Ernie)
8. "Very, Very Special Letter" - Big Bird
9. "The National Association of W Lovers" - Bert*
10. "X Marks the Spot!" - Sherlock Hemlock*
11. "Y - Just Because" - Grover and Little Girl
12. "The Zizzy Zoomers" - Anything Muppets*
13. "Madrigal Alphabet"* (Sing the Alphabet releases only)
14. "The Closing" (pre-Sing the Alphabet releases only)

An asterisk indicates a track that was performed on the Sesame Street series.

== Muppet Performers ==
- Caroll Spinney - Big Bird and Oscar the Grouch
- Jim Henson - Ernie, Guy Smiley, J Friend #2, Zizzy Zoomer #1, Tom Tattertall Tuttletutt, and Anything Muppet #2
- Frank Oz - Bert, Grover, Cookie Monster, Lefty the Salesman, Harvey Kneeslapper, Professor Hastings, J Friend #4, Zizzy Zoomer #3, and Anything Muppet #3
- Jerry Nelson - Herry Monster, Herbert Birdsfoot, Sherlock Hemlock, Farley, George, J Friend #1, Zizzy Zoomer #2, Sammy the Snake, Ambercrombie the Ant, "What's My Letter?" Announcer, and Anything Muppet #1
- Fran Brill - Prairie Dawn, Little Girl, Singer, and J Friend #3
- Jerry Juhl - Queen (uncredited)
- Joe Raposo - Additional Voices (uncredited)
- Jeff Moss - Additional Voices (uncredited)
- Kevin Clash - Elmo
