= Seth MacFarlane Sings the Muppets =

Studio album by Seth MacFarlane
- Released: September 18, 2026
- Studios: Skywalker Sound (Skywalker Ranch); The Newman Stage (Fox Studios)
- Genres: Traditional pop; easy listening; swing; big band; children's
- Length: 46:36
- Labels: Republic; Verve; Fuzzy Door; Walt Disney
- Producers: Joel McNeely; Seth MacFarlane

Seth MacFarlane chronology
Lush Life: The Lost Sinatra Arrangements (2025)	Seth MacFarlane Sings the Muppets (2026)

Singles from Seth MacFarlane Sings the Muppets
- 1. "Bein' Green" Released: August 11, 2026; 2. "Happiness Hotel" Released: September 4, 2026

Seth MacFarlane Sings the Muppets is the tenth studio album by American actor and singer Seth MacFarlane. The album was released on September 18, 2026, through Republic Records, Verve Records, and Walt Disney Records. It is a collection of covers of songs originally recorded and performed by the Muppets in their various films and television series. The album is preceded by its lead single, a cover of Kermit the Frog's "Bein' Green", and a second single featuring a cover of "Happiness Hotel".

== Background and production ==
The album was recorded at Skywalker Ranch featuring a combined orchestra of London and Los Angeles musicians conducted by John Wilson. The album was arranged by Andrew Cotte. At the 2026 D23 convention, MacFarlane explained that, as a lifelong Muppets fan, he wanted to reimagine the songs in the easygoing big-band style of the 1940s and 1950s rather than trying to modernize them.

The first single, "Bein' Green", released on August 11, 2026, along with the announcement of the album. The second single, "Happiness Hotel", released on September 4, 2026.

MacFarlane previously covered "Halfway Down the Stairs" (track 13) as Peter Griffin on Family Guy, during the season 17 episode "You Can't Handle the Booth!". He also covered "The First Time It Happens" (track 14) on his 2017 album In Full Swing.

== Release ==
The album was released on September 18, 2026, which coincides with the 50-year anniversary of The Muppet Show.

== Track listing ==
Seth MacFarlane Sings the Muppets track listing
No.	Title	Writer(s)	Originally from	Length
1.	"Together Again"	Jeff Moss	The Muppets Take Manhattan	2:34
2.	"Somebody's Getting Married"	Moss	The Muppets Take Manhattan	2:44
3.	"Couldn't We Ride"	Joe Raposo	The Great Muppet Caper	2:58
4.	"Bein' Green"	Raposo	Sesame Street	4:10
5.	"Hey, a Movie!"	Raposo	The Great Muppet Caper	2:35
6.	"Right Where I Belong"	Moss	The Muppets Take Manhattan	2:58
7.	"I’m Going to Go Back There Someday"	Paul Williams; Kenneth Ascher	The Muppet Movie	5:26
8.	"Happiness Hotel"	Raposo	The Great Muppet Caper	2:31
9.	"Rainbow Connection"	Williams; Ascher	The Muppet Movie	4:25
10.	"Movin' Right Along" (featuring Liz Gillies)	Williams; Ascher	The Muppet Movie	3:06
11.	"Steppin’ Out with a Star"	Raposo	The Great Muppet Caper	2:39
12.	"I Hope That Somethin’ Better Comes Along"	Williams; Ascher; MacFarlane^{[a]}	The Muppet Movie	2:57
13.	"Halfway Down the Stairs"	A. A. Milne; Harold Fraser-Simson	The Muppet Show	3:07
14.	"The First Time It Happens"	Raposo	The Great Muppet Caper	4:28
Total length:				46:44

=== Note ===
- ^{^[a]} signifies an additional lyricist.

== Personnel ==
Credits are adapted from the album's liner notes.

=== Musicians ===
- Seth MacFarlane – vocals
- Andrew Cottee – arrangement
- John Wilson – conducting
- John Mills – concertmaster
- Tereza Stanislav – concertmaster
- Ciaran McCabe – second violin
- Jessica Guideri – second violin
- Charlie Lovell-Jones – violin
- Roberto Ruisi – violin
- Mike Traino – violin
- Jens Lynen – violin
- Steve Wilkie – violin
- Tamara Hatwan – violin
- Michael Siess – violin
- Misha Vayman – violin
- Alyssa Park – violin
- Luanne Homzy – violin
- Gallia Kastner – violin
- Sara Parkins – violin
- Josefina Vergara – violin
- Maya Magub – violin
- Grace Oh – violin
- Hana Kim – violin
- Camille Miller – violin
- Luke Turrell – first viola
- Robert Brophy – first viola
- Vicci Wardman – viola
- Jonah Sirota – viola
- Shawn Mann – viola
- Aaron Oltman – viola
- Jonathan Aasgaard – first cello
- Andrew Shulman – first cello
- Tim Lowe – cello
- Charlie Tyler – cello
- Ben Lash – cello
- Jacob Braun – cello
- Leah Hansen – cello
- Philip Nelson – first bass
- Mike Valerio – first bass
- David Grossman – bass
- Marcia Dickstein – harp
- Charlotte Ashton – first flute
- Ben Smolen – first flute
- Amy Tatum – flute
- Jenni Olson – flute
- Tom Blomfield – first oboe
- Eder Rivera – first oboe
- Benjamin Mellefont – first clarinet
- Stuart Clark – first clarinet
- Dan Higgins – clarinet, tenor saxophone, first saxophone
- Jonathan Sacdalan – clarinet
- Rose Corrigan – first bassoon
- Sal Lozano – saxophone
- Brian Scanlon – saxophone
- Rusty Higgins – saxophone
- Chad Smith – saxophone
- Dylan Hart – first French horn
- Laura Brenes – French horn
- Teag Reaves – French horn
- Russell Bennett – first trumpet
- James Davison – trumpet
- Mike Davis – trumpet
- Chris Snead – trumpet
- Andy Wood – first trombone
- Alex Iles – first trombone
- Jon Stokes – trombone
- Tom Dunnett – trombone
- Pete North – trombone
- Ryan Dragon – trombone
- Alan Kaplan – trombone
- Ido Meshulam – trombone
- Wade Culbreath – percussion, timpani
- Larry Koonse – guitar
- Peter Erskine – drums
- Chuck Berghofer – upright bass
- Tom Ranier – piano, celeste
- George Doering – banjo

=== Technical and creative ===
- Seth MacFarlane – production
- Joel McNeely – production
- Rich Breen – co-production, recording, mixing
- Joy Fehily – executive production
- Dave Collins – mastering
- Dann Thompson – stage recording
- Christine Sirois – stage recording
- Danielle Adams – Pro Tools operation
- Larry Mah – Pro Tools operation
- Mark Graham – music preparation
- John Wilson – musician contracting
- Gina Zimmitti – musician contracting
- Whitney Martin – musician contracting
- Victor Pesavento – music librarian
- Allison Calleri – production coordination
- Casey Brewer – production coordination
- Matthew Svoboda – production coordination
- Joe Spix – art direction, design
- Kristen Sorace – art direction, design
- Paul Mann – cover illustration

== Charts ==
Chart performance for Seth MacFarlane Sings the Muppets
Chart (2026)	Peak position
UK Jazz & Blues Albums (Official Charts)	10
US Top Jazz Albums (Billboard)	13
US Top Traditional Jazz Albums (Billboard)	11

== Release history ==
Release history and formats for Seth MacFarlane Sings the Muppets
Region	Date	Format(s)	Label	Ref.
Various	September 18, 2026	Digital download; streaming; CD; vinyl	Republic; Verve; Fuzzy Door Productions; Walt Disney	
