= Guy Smiley =

Character from Sesame Street

- Sesame Street character
- First appearance: 1969 (as Sonny Friendly)
- Created by: Jim Henson
- Performed by: Jim Henson (1969–1990); Eric Jacobson (2005–present)

In-universe information
- Species: Anything Muppet
- Gender: Male

Guy Smiley is a fictional character on Sesame Street who was dubbed "America's favorite game show host". His skits are among those on the show that parody commercial media. Smiley has also hosted This Is Your Lunch and Here Is Your Life, a parody of This Is Your Life. Guests who were profiled included a loaf of bread, a tooth and a tree (all aimed at teaching children how things are made). He has also hosted pageants for numbers and letters.

Joan Ganz Cooney cited the character as one of her favorites of original performer Jim Henson, although it was his least favorite to perform, as the character had a boisterous voice which proved too hard on his throat. Due to this, the character's dialogue was usually pre-recorded so that Henson could do multiple takes without straining his throat.

The character was mostly discontinued upon Henson's death in 1990.

== Game shows ==
Smiley has hosted many game show skits, such as:

- Can You Guess? — a satire of To Tell The Truth — Three Muppets, a father, mother and son, each announce themselves as "the mother of this family", and Grover (then called "Billy Monster") has to guess which is the true mother. (The Smiley character was then named "Big Bob".)
- Pick Your Pet — a blindfolded little girl Muppet, Betty Lou, must choose one of three animals (one a monster) as her own pet without being able to see any of them, after asking each of them how they would behave in her home as her pet and listening to their answers. (The Smiley character was then named "Sonny Friendly".)
- The Mr. and Mrs. Game — the first skit in which the host was named Guy Smiley, this satire of The Newlywed Game featured a monster couple. The object was for the wife to guess her husband's favorite color, food and sport without being told in advance, after Betty Lou took him into a soundproof booth so he couldn't hear his wife's answers.
- The Remembering Game — a spoof of Concentration, two contestants try to match prizes on a four-space board. In its one appearance, Cookie Monster and an Anything Muppet named Bill Smith didn't like the prizes they had "won", so they traded prizes after Cookie had won an airplane and Bill had won a cookie.
- What's My Part? — a spoof of What's My Line? — Three blindfolded celebrities had to identify a body part before all three of them were disqualified (by asking a question that had a "no" answer). The first segment, featuring a nose, starred panelists Cookie Monster, Bennett Snerf and Arlene Frantic as noseless monsters. (The latter two were Muppet parodies of longtime What's My Line? panelists Bennett Cerf and Arlene Francis). None of them guessed right and the nose won the game. The second segment, featuring a foot, starred Snerf, Frantic, and Professor Hastings as Anything Muppets with human features. Professor Hastings won the game by accident after he complains his foot fell asleep.
- What's My Letter? – Based on the sixth track from the 1971 Sesame Street record The Muppet Alphabet Album, this sequence featured Smiley challenging Prairie Dawn to guess a particular letter of the alphabet.
- Get Wordy - a spoof of Jeopardy!, Smiley reads a meaning of a phrase and contestants have to guess what the phrase is.
- Mystery Guest — a spoof of a term used on What's My Line? — The contestants, (Cookie Monster, Don Music and Sherlock Hemlock), must guess who the Mystery Guest is. In this clip, it was the letter X, but nobody guessed correctly, and it turned out that the letter X belonged in the exit sign. After the contestants left, The announcer blurts "You sure fooled them, X." It ran once.
- Beat the Time — a spoof of Beat the Clock — The contestant must bring in a number of things that rhyme with the key word or contain something. In one segment, Cookie Monster must find three things that rhyme with "rain", and will win a cookie if successful before the arrow on the clock reaches zero. Cookie manages to find a cane he stole from an old man, a chain holding a monster (Frazzle) and, at the last second, arrives onto the stage by smashing through the wall with a train (the same train he rode in "The Ballad of Casey McPhee"). It ran for four segments. Another segment involved the Count, where the Count has to bring in two things that come from the sky (his thunder and lightning when he counts). This is the one where Smiley reveals his real name to be Bernie Liederkranz. In the next segment, Elmo had to three things that starts the SN sound. He found a snack of nuts and raisins he stole from a business man, A sneaker worn by Telly, and a Snuffleupagus. Elmo successfully did it before the arrow on the clock reaches zero, And Elmo's prize also started with a SN sound: A snowman wearing a Snorkel.
- Bring that Thing - a spoof of a term used on Beat the Clock - The contestants are Stevie and Jonathan Martians (AKA The Yip-Yips). The Martians must find three things in 30 seconds that helps them see at night. They found flashlight, A lamp, and they used their spaceship to bring the Moon. The grand prize of a jar of fireflies.
- To Tell a Face — a spoof of To Tell the Truth — A Baby must figure out who is real person out of three panelists. It ran for seven segments.
- The Triangle Is Right — A spoof on the title The Price Is Right — Every question is answered with the response, "A triangle" (a possible indirect reference to the real-life quiz show scandals of the '50s). It was short-lived.
- What's My Job? — another spoof of What's My Line? - The three contestant monsters have to figure out what the person's job is. Round 1 was a firefighter, Round 2 was a dentist, and Round 3 was another game show host named Sonny Friendly (who thinks Guy Smiley is a guest). They argued at the end leaving with Guy Smiley remarking "This whole thing was a rotten idea! Who put this man on the show?" His suit was provided by Sierra Lagoon, while Sonny Friendly's suit was provided by Frederick La Frensworth.
- Say the Word — a spoof of The $25,000 Pyramid - The contestants are Chet O'Leary and Maurice Monster. Guy gives Chet the word "STOP" but Chet cannot say that word but give out clues to Maurice Monster on the word. He tickles Maurice Monster until Maurice yells "STOP!" and Guy Smiley blurted "That's right. You said the word STOP! Congratulations!"
- Name that Sound! — a spoof of Name That Tune There were two skits.
  - Grover: Grover has to guess the three sounds (Such as a train whistle, a dog barking, and faucet dripping). He got them all right, but after he guessed the faucet dripping, it got flooded.
  - Honker: A Honker has to figure out the sounds but since Guy Smiley couldn't understand them, the Honker brings in things that have been mentioned by the sounds (Such as a cow, a horse, and a fire engine).
- Dialing for Prizes Movie — a spoof of Dialing for Dollars The lucky contestant is Mr. Lucky. And the lucky word is "Fur". And the prizes are furry monsters.
- Here is Your Life — a spoof of This is Your Life - Guy Smiley honors the contestant (usually a certain object) They include:
  - an oak tree
  - a loaf of bread
  - a tooth
  - a right foot sneaker
  - a painting of a bowl of fruit
  - a house (2102 Shady Lane)
  - a carton of eggs
- The Letter of the Day Pageant — a spoof of Miss America Pageant in which all letters compete. The letter S can swim; the letter C addresses herself as the letter C; and the letter T can tap dance. Up came the vowel finalists, A, E, I, O, and U. The letter E wins the pageant, and Guy Smiley sings him a song about the letter E to honor the winner.
- The How Many Game - an unknown spoof. The Two Headed Monster are the contestants in a Guy Smiley game show. The screen reveals the number 2. They have only 30 seconds to find two things. But they found 1 bowling ball, three cows, and four sheep. They found out they have two heads.
- Happiness Begins at 40 - The contestants are The Sad Family from Miserable Falls, Colorado. They enter the studio sobbing dramatically, but gradually counts up to 40 to improve their emotion. They become happy when they reach to the number 40. When they become joyful, Guy Smiley remarks "Well, I guess this proves that Happiness does begin at 40."

== Other appearances ==
In Sesame Street's premiere season (1969–70), Smiley sang Allie Wrubel and Herb Magidson's 1937 song "Gone with the Wind" while a strong wind was blowing away a tree, a house, a woman, and ultimately his clothes. This segment was also dubbed in Spanish for international broadcasts.

Also that season, Smiley hosted the first segment of "The Answer Lady", featuring an elderly woman named Granny Fanny Nesselrode who claimed she had the answer to everything but never gave the best answer to any question sent in by a viewer. Smiley was later replaced by a regionally accented Muppet host who bore some resemblance to him.

Smiley did make some appearances that didn't have anything notable to do with his hosting career. When Cookie Monster was in a bakery chewing up items that rhymed with the word "buy", Smiley came in announcing he was "Guy Smiley, star of daytime television". At this point, Cookie couldn't remember that it was a pie he was after, and the repeated use of words that did rhyme with "pie" did nothing to jog his memory. The scene ended with him wrongly realizing that the rhyming item was "GUY!", and chasing Smiley around the bakery, trying to eat his hand off.

He also appeared in a sketch featuring Grover as an Elevator Operator. It was to teach kids to face the front of an elevator. In this sketch, "Mr. Smiley" (as Grover calls him) is also voiced by Jim Henson, but with a different voice than that of his game show personality.

In one movie theatre skit with Bert and Ernie, using Smiley as a one-line extra, the character is puppeted by Richard Hunt.

Additionally, Guy Smiley appeared as a background character in the Sesame Street music video "Exit" performed by Little Chrissy, where he and Bert are seen going out together through the appropriately-placed "EXIT" door as Chrissy sings.

In a counting skit, Guy Smiley also took his entire studio audience to lunch, hoping there would be a big enough table. While there was a table for the 39 members of the audience, there was no available table for 40, forcing Smiley to sit outside and be sent the bill later.

Guy Smiley also appeared in Alphabet Chat doing a commercial for Bow Wow Chow while Mr. Chatterly was trying to do a lecture about the letter R.

He also appeared in On Vacation With Guy Smiley, in which he tried to photograph various animals in the jungle, but his loud voice kept scaring them off. At least until a tiger (Martin P. Robinson) came along, roaring and scaring away Guy's guide (Richard Hunt), but the tiger took the camera and took Guy's picture with the other animals. His pith helmet was provided by Zimbabwe After Six.

Smiley shows up as a non-speaking background extra (wearing an odd, unusually stern expression) along with many other Muppets in the musical skit "Some/None".

Guy Smiley also hosted the banquet meeting of things that begin with SH sound. Including a shirt, a shovel, a shrimp, a sheep with a shepherd, and even a short sized king.

== Casting history ==
- Jim Henson: Sesame Street Season 1 (1969) – Season 21 (1990)
- Don Reardon: CD-ROM games (voice only)
- Eric Jacobson: Sesame Street Presents: The Body (2005) – present

== International ==
Sesame Street is localized for international markets, where Smiley is often renamed. In Portugal, for example, he's "Carlos Luz", a play on words with the name of television presenter Carlos Cruz. In the Netherlands, he is called "Henk Glimlach", "glimlach" meaning "smile". In Germany, he appears simply as "Robert", possibly after Robert Lembke, a game show host.
