= The Muppets Mayhem (soundtrack) =

2023 soundtrack album by Dr. Teeth and the Electric Mayhem

The Muppets Mayhem (Music from the Disney+ Original Series)
- Digital release soundtrack album cover art

Soundtrack album by Dr. Teeth and the Electric Mayhem
- Released: May 10, 2023
- Recorded: 2022–2023
- Genre: Rock
- Length: 1:30:07
- Label: Walt Disney
- Producer: Linda Perry

The Muppets chronology
Muppets Most Wanted (Original Motion Picture Soundtrack) (2014)	The Muppets Mayhem (Music from the Disney+ Original Series) (2023)

Singles from The Muppets Mayhem (Music from the Disney+ Original Series)
- 1. "Can You Picture That?" Released: September 9, 2022; 2. "Rock On" Released: April 21, 2023

The Muppets Mayhem (Music from the Disney+ Original Series) is the soundtrack to the comedy musical television series The Muppets Mayhem based on the Muppet musical group, Dr. Teeth and the Electric Mayhem. The soundtrack features eight original songs as well as seven covers of popular hits as featured in the series. Grammy-nominated songwriter Linda Perry, who also wrote two of the original songs, served as the executive music producer. The series features original score composed by Mick Giacchino and produced by his father Michael Giacchino.

The album was preceded by two lead singles: "Can You Picture That?" released at the D23 Expo on September 9, 2022, and "Rock On" released on April 21, 2023. Walt Disney Records released a series soundtrack album digitally and on streaming on May 10, 2023. The soundtrack reached number 1 on the Billboard Kid Albums chart—the first time the Muppets have ever topped a Billboard chart—and peaked at number 10 on the Soundtracks chart, earning 5,000 album-equivalent units in its first week.

== Reception ==
The Muppets Mayhem soundtrack received a positive review from Daps Magic who commented that "The soundtrack for The Muppets Mayhem is a wonderful release that is a lot of fun to listen to and is really well done. It is fun to listen to while working or working out and will definitely make any new or old Muppets fan smile!"

== Track listing ==
The Muppets Mayhem (Music From the Disney+ Original Series)
No.	Title	Writer(s)	Length
1.	"Rock On"	Hannah Friedman, Dan Pinnella	3:06
2.	"Gotta Be"	Ed Mitchell, Steve Morrell	3:06
3.	"True Colors" (Cyndi Lauper cover)	Billy Steinberg, Tom Kelly	3:37
4.	"The Sound of Us"	Gabriel Mann, Jeannie Lurie	2:45
5.	"Have a Little Faith in Me" (John Hiatt cover)	John Hiatt	3:00
6.	"Join Together" (The Who cover)	Pete Townshend	2:39
7.	"We Are One" (featuring Ringo Starr on drums)	Linda Perry	3:38
8.	"Can You Picture That?" (originally from The Muppet Movie)	Paul Williams, Kenneth Ascher	2:46
9.	"God Only Knows" (The Beach Boys cover)	Brian Wilson, Tony Asher	2:55
10.	"On Our Way"	Nicholas C. Rowe	2:26
11.	"Bridge Over Troubled Water" (Simon & Garfunkel cover)	Paul Simon	3:46
12.	"Rock and Roll All Nite" (Kiss cover)	Paul Stanley, Gene Simmons	3:00
13.	"Gonna Get There"	Perry, Jeff Yorkes	3:21
14.	"Believe in Us" (Extended Edition)	Brian Mazzaferri, Bill Prokopow, Packy Lundholm	4:39
15.	"Makin' Mayhem" (featuring Sofia Carson)		0:36
16.	"All You Need Is Love" (The Beatles cover)	Lennon–McCartney	3:30
17.	"MAYHEM!"		2:39
18.	"The Muppets Mayhem Medley"		2:39
19.	"Marshmallucinations"		4:50
20.	"Nora's Medley"		1:55
21.	"Zoot's Suits"		1:21
22.	"The Muppets Mayhem End Credits"		1:01
Total length:			1:03:02

== Chart performance ==
Weekly chart performance for The Muppets Mayhem (Music From the Disney+ Original Series)
Chart (2023)	Peak position
UK Soundtrack Albums (OCC)	37
US Kid Albums (Billboard)	1
US Soundtrack Albums (Billboard)	10
US Top Album Sales (Billboard)	29
US Top Current Album Sales (Billboard)	23

== The Electric Mayhem ==
The Electric Mayhem
- Vinyl release cover art

Studio album by Dr. Teeth and the Electric Mayhem
- Released: May 12, 2023
- Recorded: 2022–2023
- Genre: Rock
- Length: 43:42
- Label: Walt Disney
- Producer: Linda Perry

The Electric Mayhem is the debut studio album by Dr. Teeth and the Electric Mayhem that featured the first fourteen tracks from the original soundtrack album. It was released by Walt Disney Records as a vinyl LP on May 12, 2023, two days after the series' premiere. The packaging of the album consisted of a cover art by Matt Taylor and layout by Sean Tejaratchi, and two colored 180-gram vinyl LPs: translucent blue/purple swirl and psychedelic green. The latter was released as an exclusive edition from Target Corporation. The album itself is shown on the season finale "We Will Rock You".

=== Track listing ===
The Electric Mayhem
No.	Title	Length
1.	"Rock On"	3:06
2.	"Gotta Be"	3:06
3.	"True Colors" (Cyndi Lauper cover)	3:37
4.	"The Sound of Us"	2:45
5.	"Have a Little Faith in Me" (John Hiatt cover)	3:00
6.	"Join Together" (The Who cover)	2:39
7.	"We Are One" (featuring Ringo Starr on drums)	3:38
8.	"Can You Picture That?" (originally from The Muppet Movie)	2:46
9.	"God Only Knows" (The Beach Boys cover)	2:55
10.	"On Our Way"	2:26
11.	"Bridge Over Troubled Water" (Simon & Garfunkel cover)	3:46
12.	"Rock and Roll All Nite" (KISS cover)	3:00
13.	"Gonna Get There"	3:21
14.	"Believe in Us"	3:45
Total length:		43:42

== Charts ==
Weekly chart performance for The Electric Mayhem
Chart (2023)	Peak position
UK Soundtrack Albums (OCC)	37
US Vinyl Albums (Billboard)	10

== Credits ==
Credits adapted from album liner notes

Album credits

- Executive music producer: Linda Perry
- Vocal producers: Ed Mitchell, Steve Morrell, Eldad Guetta
- Music supervisor: Kier Lehman
- Music coordinator: James Cartwright
- Executives in charge of music: Dawn Soler and Peter DiCecco
- Mastering: Mike Bozzi
- Track production: Bill Prokopow, Packy Lundholm, Brian Mazzaferri (tracks 1, 4, 10, 14), Ed Mitchell, Steve Morrell (tracks 2–3, 5–6, 11–12), Linda Perry (tracks 7, 9, 13), Sean Fitzgerald (track 8)
- Incidental music production: Mick Giacchino
- Mixing: Rick Ruggieri, Bill Prokopow, Packy Lundholm, Linda Perry, Sean Fitzgerald
- Assistant engineer: Luis Flores

Performer credits

- Muppet performers: Bill Barretta as Dr. Teeth, Matt Vogel as Floyd Pepper, David Rudman as Janice, Eric Jacobson as Animal, Dave Goelz as Zoot, and Peter Linz as Lips.
- All instruments: Steve Morrell (tracks 2–3, 5–6, 11–12)
- Electric guitar, acoustic guitar (10 only), organ: Packy Lundholm (tracks 1, 4, 10, 14)
- Saxophones: Hannah Friedman (track 1), Leon Silva (track 7)
- Horns: David Ralicke (track 1)
- Synthesizers: Bill Prokopow (track 4), Packy Lundholm (tracks 1, 4, 10, 14)
- Orchestra: Bill Prokopow (track 14)
- Brass: Niv Toar (track 4), Bill Prokopow (track 10–14)
- B3 organ (7), additional instruments (9): Linda Perry
- Tenor saxophone: Matt Bauder (track 8), Colin Kupka (track 9)
- Trumpets: Sean Erick (track 9), Wayne Bergeron (track 22), Matt Bauder (track 8)
- Guitar: Joshua Ray Gooch (track 7), Joseph Guese (track 9), Eli Pearl (track 13), Andrew Synowiec (track 22)
- Bass: Billy Mohler (tracks 7, 9, 13), Packy Lundholm (tracks 1, 4, 10, 14), Abe Laboriel (track 22)
- Drums: Ringo Starr (track 7), Ben LeCourt (track 9), Kiel Feher (track 13), Packy Lundholm (tracks 1, 4, 10, 14), Bernie Dresel (track 22)
- Horns arranged by: The Regiment Horns (track 7), Linda Perry (track 13)
- Drums recorded by Bruce Sugar (track 7)
- Keys: Dylan Meek (track 9)
- Baritone saxophone, tenor saxophone, clarinet: Colin Kupka (track 9)
- Violin: Elyssa Samsel
- Piano: Ben Darwish (track 13), Packy Lundholm (tracks 1, 4, 10, 14)
- Gospel choir: Bill Prokopow, Packy Lundholm, Brian Mazzaferri (track 14)
- Percussion: Bernie Dresel (track 22)
