= Pat Collins (film critic) =

American film critic

- Born: 1943 (age 82–83); Chelmsford, Massachusetts, U.S.
- Occupation: Film critic
- Spouses: Joe Raposo (m. 1976; died 1989); William Sarnoff (m. 1994)
- Children: 4

Pat Collins (born 1943) is an American retired film critic and three-time Emmy winner for WWOR-TV. Collins was an entertainment editor and film critic for Good Morning America and the CBS Morning News and from 1973–1977, hosted the Pat Collins Show on WCBS-TV, for which she won two local Emmy Awards.

== Personal life ==
Collins is married to William Sarnoff. She had previously been married to Joe Raposo from January 1976 until his death in 1989. They had two children together, as well as two children from his previous marriage. In 1983, she authored a book, How to Be a Really Nice Person. She announced her retirement from WWOR in November 2012.
