= Aren't You Glad You're You? (album) =

Aren't You Glad You're You

Studio album by Sesame Street cast
- Released: January 1, 1977
- Recorded: 1976
- Genre: Children's music
- Length: 31:19
- Label: Sesame Workshop

Aren't You Glad You're You? is an album made by the cast of Sesame Street in 1977.

== Track listing ==
No.	Title	Artist	Length
1.	"My Name"	Bob, Gordon, Maria & Susan	3:13
2.	"Believe in Yourself"	Big Bird, Bob, Gordon & Susan	3:37
3.	"Special"	Bob	2:02
4.	"Wonderful Me"	Oscar	2:21
5.	"Me/Yo"	Gordon & Maria	1:40
6.	"Cookie Disco"	Cookie Monster	2:38
7.	"Aren't You Glad You're You?"	Big Bird & Bob	1:55
8.	"Proud"	Little Jerry & the Monotones	1:42
9.	"I'd Like to Tell a Story"	Olivia	3:20
10.	"Don't You Know You're Beautiful"	Bob & Three Monsters	2:51
11.	"Walk Down the Street"	Gordon, Maria & Susan	2:40
12.	"This Frog"	Cast of Thousands & Kermit the Frog	3:22
Total length:			31:19
