= Elmo & the Orchestra =

Studio album by Sesame Street
- Released: 2001
- Genre: Children's
- Label: Sony

Elmo & the Orchestra is a CD by the cast of Sesame Street, which won a Best Musical Album for Children Grammy in 2001.

== Track listing ==
1. Introduction
2. Symphony No. 40 in G Minor, K550, 1st Movement – Wolfgang Amadeus Mozart
3. 24 Caprices Opus No.1
4. Sabre Dance
5. Serenade No. 13 in G Major, Eine Kleine Nachtmusik, K525, 1st Movement – Wolfgang Amadeus Mozart
6. Peer Gynt Suite No. 1, Morning Mood – Edvard Grieg
7. Water Music Suite No. 2 in D Major, Alla Hornpipe – George Frideric Handel
8. J'aime Percussion
9. Waltz Opus 64 No. 1
10. Piano Concerto No. 21 in C Major, K467, 2nd Movement – Wolfgang Amadeus Mozart
11. Thunderstorm from "Symphony No. 6 in F Major, Pastoral" – Ludwig van Beethoven
12. Flight of the Bumblebee – Nikolai Rimsky-Korsakov
13. Carnival of the Animals, Swan – Camille Saint-Saëns
14. The Nutcracker Suite, Dance of the Sugar Plum Fairies – Pyotr Ilyich Tchaikovsky
15. Can-Can – Jacques Offenbach
16. Lullaby – Johannes Brahms
17. Symphony No. 94 in G Major, Surprise, 2nd Movement – Franz Joseph Haydn
18. Ride of the Valkyries – Richard Wagner
19. Blue Danube Waltz – Johann Strauss, Jr.
20. Symphony No. 5 in C Minor, 1st Movement – Ludwig van Beethoven

== See also ==
- Sesame Street discography
