= Muppet Beach Party =

1993 The Muppets album

Studio album by The Muppets
- Released: January 1, 1993
- Recorded: 1993
- Genre: Comedy
- Length: 33:25
- Label: Jim Henson Records, BMG Kidz

The Muppets chronology
Ol' Brown Ears is Back (1993)	Muppet Beach Party (1993)	Kermit Unpigged (1995)

Professional ratings
Review scores
Source	Rating
AllMusic	4.5/5 stars

Muppet Beach Party is a music and comedy record released by The Jim Henson Company through BMG Kidz in 1993. The album consisted of the Muppets having an all-day beach party and performing popular songs, mostly from the 1960s. Similar to The Muppet Show albums from the late 1970s, the album divides song tracks with Muppet dialogue. It was released in CD and cassette form, with the latter including a poster with lyrics on the opposite side.

The album was the first full-length Muppet album to feature Steve Whitmire as Kermit the Frog's new voice after the death of Jim Henson.

== Track listing ==
No.	Title	Writer(s)	Artist(s)	Length
1.	"Surfin' U.S.A."	Chuck Berry, Brian Wilson	Kermit the Frog and Clifford	3:10
2.	"Wooly Bully"	Domingo Samudio	Gonzo the Great, and Rizzo the Rat	2:18
3.	"Under the Boardwalk"	Kenny Young, Arthur Resnick	Clifford with the Surf Rats	3:24
4.	"Sugar Shack"	Keith McCormack, Fay Voss	The Great Gonzo and Rizzo the Rat	2:31
5.	"Itsy Bitsy Teenie Weenie Yellow Polka Dot Bikini"	Paul Vance, Lee Pockriss	Kermit	2:36
6.	"Limbo Rock"	Jon Sheldon, Billy Strange	The Muppets	2:26
7.	"Papa-Oom-Mow-Mow"	Carl White, Al Frazier, Sonny Harris, Turner Wilson Jr.	Clifford, Kermit, and Rockapella as the Giant Clams	3:15
8.	"Kokomo"	Mike Love, Scott McKenzie, Terry Melcher, John Phillips	Kermit	3:36
9.	"Surfin'"	Brian Wilson, Mike Love	The Surf Rats, featuring Buzz the Wharf Rat	2:48
10.	"Walkin' on Sunshine"	Kimberley Rew	Clifford with The Great Gonzo and Rizzo the Rat	2:40
11.	"Fun, Fun, Fun"	Brian Wilson, Mike Love	Robin the Frog and the Frog Scouts	2:19
12.	"Wipe Out"	The Surfaris	Animal	2:22

== Personnel ==
- The Muppets – Primary Artist
- Steve Whitmire – Kermit the Frog and Rizzo the Rat
- Frank Oz – Miss Piggy, Fozzie Bear and Animal
- Kevin Clash – Clifford
- Dave Goelz – Gonzo the Great
- Jerry Nelson – Robin the Frog
- Walt Harrah – Vocals
- Angie Jaree – Vocals
- Bob Joyce – Vocals
- David Joyce – Vocals
- Tampa Lann – Vocals
- Myrna Matthews – Vocals
- Rockapella – Vocals
- Randy Crenshaw – Vocal Arrangement, Vocals
- Nick Brown – Guitar
- George Doering – Guitar
- Ken Wild – Bass
- Michael Bruno – Percussion
- Ralph Humphrey – Drums
- Bill Reichenbach Jr. – Horn Arrangements, Trombone
- Gary Grant – Trumpet
- Jerry Hey – Trumpet
- Dan Higgins – Saxophone
- Mike Lang – Keyboards
- Dan Stein – Associate Producer, Keyboards, Sound Design
- Michael K. Frith – Art Direction
- Theo Panagopoulos – Art Direction
- Brian Bonehead Kinkead – Assistant Engineer
- James McIlvery – Assistant Engineer
- Dave McNair – Engineer
- Michael Golub – Engineer
- Rob Seifert – Engineer
- Bill Straus – Engineer
- Dennis Sands – Engineer/Mixer
- Ric Wilson – Mastering

== Other appearances ==
- 1980: "Surfin' U.S.A." was performed by Kermit and his frog henchmen in episode 518 of The Muppet Show.
- 1993: The Muppets' renditions of "Kokomo" and "Wipe Out" were made into music videos. "Kokomo" was included in 1994's Muppet Sing Alongs: It's Not Easy Being Green, and both videos aired on Nickelodeon.
