= Sesame Disco =

Studio album by Sesame Street
- Released: 1979
- Genre: Children, disco
- Label: Children's Television Workshop

Sesame Disco is an album made by the cast of Sesame Street in 1979. It was nominated for a Grammy Award for Best Recording for Children. The album sold more than 500,000 copies. The show promoted the album by having singers perform the songs at malls, in conjunction with a traveling set exhibit.

== Critical reception ==
Professional ratings
Review scores
Source	Rating
AllMusic	4/5 stars

AllMusic wrote that "the music on this record is wonderful... The session band is loaded with players who sound like they are right off disco sessions, while others in the cast play with enthusiastic fervor, as if their heads were full of jingling coins based on the sounds they were making."

== Track listing ==
1. "What Makes Music?" – The Entire Cast
2. "Me Lost Me Cookie at the Disco" – Cookie Monster & the Girls
3. "The Happiest Street in the World" – Big Bird, the Kids & the Girls
4. "Sing" – The Girls
5. "Disco Frog" – Kermit the Frog & the Girls
6. "Doin' the Trash" - Oscar the Grouch & the Girls
7. "Bein' Green" – Kermit the Frog & the Girls
8. "The Happiest Street in the World (Reprise)" - The Kids & the Girls

== See also ==
- Sesame Street discography
