= Halfway Down (poem) =

Poem by A. A. Milne

Ernest Shepard illustration for "Halfway Down".

"Halfway Down" is a poem by A. A. Milne, included in the 1924 collection When We Were Very Young. A "juvenile meditation", Zena Sutherland comments in Children & Books that both the poem and Ernest Shepard's illustration "has caught the mood of suspended action that is always overtaking small children on stairs." Christopher Robin, the child in Milne's Winnie the Pooh stories, is the presumed narrator of the poem.

== "Halfway Down the Stairs" ==
A song was created from the poem by Harold Fraser-Simson, who put many of Milne's poems to music.

"Halfway Down the Stairs" was used in the first season of The Muppet Show. The performance was staged in the middle of a flight of stairs, and became the most significant performance of the season for Kermit the Frog's nephew Robin the Frog. The sequence was reshot for a few different countries' broadcast of the tenth episode, with guest Harvey Korman.

The song was included on the LP The Muppet Show and later released as a single (backed with Mahna Mahna), which reached no. 7 on the UK Singles Chart in 1977. The sequence was refilmed for inclusion in Top of the Pops. The track was also included on the CD The Best of The Muppets and the VHS Playhouse Video: Children's Songs and Stories.

Jerry Nelson, who served as Robin the Frog's performer, sang the song at Jim Henson's memorial service during a segment where various Muppet performers sang Henson's favorite songs as their characters.

Rowlf the Dog sang a cover of this song in his album, Ol' Brown Ears is Back. American singer Amy Lee of the band Evanescence sang a cover of the song which was included on the 2011 album Muppets: The Green Album.

In 2019, a cover of this song was sung in the Family Guy episode "You Can't Handle the Booth!". In the episode, the show's main character Peter Griffin gets stuck in the banister slats of his staircase and dejectedly sings the song to pass the time. Series creator and voice actor Seth MacFarlane would later perform the song again for his 2026 album Seth MacFarlane Sings The Muppets.

== Text ==
Halfway down the stairs
Is a stair
Where I sit.
There isn't any
Other stair
Quite like
It.
I'm not at the bottom,
I'm not at the top;
So this is the stair
Where
I always
Stop.

Halfway up the stairs
Isn't up
And isn't down.
It isn't in the nursery,
It isn't in the town.
And all sorts of funny thoughts
Run round my head:
"It isn't really
Anywhere!
It's somewhere else
Instead!"
