= C Is for Cookie =

1971 song by Joe Raposo and performed by Cookie Monster

- Album cover the 1995 re-release

Song by Cookie Monster (Frank Oz)

from the album The Muppet Alphabet Album
- Written: 1971
- Genre: Children's
- Length: 1:29
- Label: Hal Leonard
- Songwriter: Joe Raposo
- Producer: Jim Henson

"C Is for Cookie", by Joe Raposo, is a song about the letter C performed by Cookie Monster (Frank Oz), a Muppet character from the preschool television series Sesame Street. It was first performed in Season 3, although it had been released on The Muppet Alphabet Album. Along with Kermit's "Bein' Green" and Ernie's "Rubber Duckie", it is one of the show's most recognizable songs. The original version was made in 1971 and was one of the few Sesame Street sketches directed by Jim Henson.

== History ==
According to the Muppet Central article on the "Songs from the Street" boxed set, "In 1971, Jim Henson and his performers teamed with Jerry Juhl, Joe Raposo and Jeff Moss to write a sketch on each letter of the alphabet". C Is For Cookie derives from this project. Actress Candice Bergen lip-syncs the song when she visited Sesame Street.

A version was included on Sesame Street Fever. A 12" promo single included disco remixes by Larry Levan and Roy Thode.

In 1993, a new operatic version was taped, featuring opera singer Marilyn Horne as Cleopatra, in an Egyptian setting with a pyramid made entirely out of cookies in the background. At the end of the song once "Cleopatra" is carried away out of sight, Cookie Monster appears in Egyptian attire and pulls a cookie off the pyramid, causing it to collapse with a huge crash while he eats it.

Since then, several authorized and unauthorized versions of the song have been produced, including "funky" and "sweet" versions released on the 2003 record Cookie Monster & the Girls. Laura Pace's review of the home video Elmo's World: The Street We Live On noted 'the bizarreness of "C is for Cookie" done in Aida-style opera'. A short reprise of the song is also performed by Cookie Monster and the cast of Sesame Street on the 1975 album Bert & Ernie Sing-Along. In addition, since the advent of YouTube, there have also been recordings of the song, regular and operatic, in reverse, under such titles as "C Is For Cookie Reversed" or "Cheese Good For Fleas" (which is what the phrase "C is for Cookie" sounds like dubbed backwards).

Sheet music of the song has been published by the Hal Leonard Corporation, Sheet Music Plus, and others. The toy "Letter of the Day Cookie Jar" features Cookie Monster saying a short phrase about each letter. For "C", he says "C is for Cookie". He also adds that a donut is a 'C' if you eat part of it.
