= Sam Pottle =

American composer (1934–1978)

Samuel H. Pottle (May 8, 1934 – July 4, 1978) was an American composer, conductor, and musical director involved in many theatrical and television productions. Born in New Haven, Connecticut, he is perhaps best remembered for his work on Sesame Street and The Muppet Show, having co-written the iconic Muppet Show theme song for the latter. However, Pottle was also involved with many theatrical productions in the 1960s and 1970s. His principal collaborators were David Axelrod and Tom Whedon, although he also worked with other lyricists. He replaced Joe Raposo as musical director for Sesame Street from season 6 through season 9.

== Career ==
Pottle graduated from Yale in 1955. At Yale he was president of the Yale Dramatic Association, and in 1954 he wrote the music for the Dramat's successful original musical, Stover at Yale. His father was Frederick A. Pottle, Sterling Professor of English at Yale.

He died on July 4, 1978, from a heart attack while on holiday in Great Barrington, Massachusetts. His partner, writer Charles Choset, dedicated the 1982 plays Letters to Ben and The Messiah to him. His remains were donated to medical science.

== Credits ==
=== Theatre ===
- All Kinds of Giants (off Broadway) (1961) book and lyrics by Tom Whedon
- Money, a Musical Play for Cabaret (1963) with book and lyrics by David Axelrod and Tom Whedon
- The Mad Show (1966) Broadway theatre - conductor
- Keep Tightly Closed in a Cool Dry Place (La MaMa Experimental Theatre Club, 1968) - composer
- Cry for Us All (Broadway, 1970) - musical supervisor
- The Meehans (1977) - composer

=== Television ===
==== Sesame Street ====
- Musical director
- Composer
  - "What's the Name of That Song?" (with David Axelrod) - 1974
  - "City-Country Song" (with Emily Kingsley) - 1974
  - "Mary Had a Bicycle" (with David Korr) - 1974
  - "I Just Adore Four" (with Joseph A. Bailey) - 1974
  - "Numerical Correspondence Song" (with David Korr and David Axelrod) - 1974
  - "The Subway" (with Grace Hawthorne) - 1974
  - "Swamp Mushy Muddy" (with Norman Stiles and David Axelrod) - 1974
  - "Beep" (with Emily Kingsley) - 1974
  - "Happy / Sad" (with Gene Moss) - 1974
  - "Women Can Be" (with Carol Hall) - 1974
  - "Wonder Child" (with David Axelrod) - 1974
  - "A Very Simple Dance" (with Carol Hall) - 1974
  - "Counting Is Wonderful" (with Emily Kingsley and David Axelrod) - 1975
  - "I Want a Monster to Be My Friend" (with Robert Pierce) - 1975
  - "Frazzle" (with David Axelrod) - 1975
  - "Fur" (with David Axelrod) - 1975
  - "Monster Lullaby" (with David Axelrod) - 1975
  - "Keep Christmas With You (All Through the Year)" (with David Axelrod) - for Merry Christmas from Sesame Street, 1975
  - "I Hate Christmas" (with David Axelrod) - for Merry Christmas from Sesame Street, 1975
  - "Elevator Song" (with Ray Sipherd) - 1976
  - "It's Funny" (with David Korr) - 1976
  - "The Transylvania Polka" (with Tony Geiss) - 1976
  - "Madame Schwartzhead Blending" (with David Axelrod) - 1976
  - "This Frog" (with David Axlerod) - 1976
  - "One Way" (with Christopher Cerf) - 1976
  - "Bus Stop" (with David Axelrod) - 1976
  - "A Song from Kermit" (with David Axelrod) - 1976
  - "I Love a March" (with Carol Hall) - 1976
  - "Ah, For the Joys of the Countryside" (with David Axelrod) - 1976
  - "Proud of Me" (with Carol Hall) - 1976
  - "Just Around the Corner" (with David Axelrod and Ray Sipherd) - 1976
  - "Furry Blue Mommy of Mine" (with David Axelrod) - 1977
  - "Cookie Disco" (with Christopher Cerf) - 1977
  - "Feelin' Good/Feelin' Bad" (with David Axelrod) - 1977
  - "Sound It Out" (with Sara Compton) - 1977
  - "Cry" (with Sara Compton) - 1977
  - "I Got a Song" (with David Axelrod) - 1977
  - "Sing After Me" (with Tony Geiss) - 1977
  - "Beginning, Middle, End" (with David Korr) - 1977
  - "Count Up To Nine" (with David Axelrod) - 1977
  - "This is my J" (with David Axelrod) - 1977
  - "Three Waltzing Chickens" (with David Axelrod) - 1977
  - "Disco D" (with Tony Geiss) - 1978
  - "Pigeons on Parade" (with Tony Geiss) - 1978
  - "David's Street Fever" (with Northern Calloway) - 1979 (posthumous)
  - "Six of One" (with Alan Menken) - 1979 (posthumous)
  - "Without People" (with Alan Menken) - 1981 (posthumous)

==== The Muppet Show ====
- Composer
  - "The Muppet Show Theme" (with Jim Henson) - 1976

=== Other works ===
- Composer
  - "Dear Lord and Father of Mankind" (text by John Greenleaf Whittier) for SATB choir and piano, publ. Trigon Music, 1972
  - "Jabberwocky" (text from Lewis Carroll's poem of the same name) for SATB choir, piano, harpsichord and small instruments, publ. Trigon Music, 1972
  - "We'll Find America" (with David Axelrod) - 1975
