= Bert & Ernie Sing-Along =

Studio album by Bert and Ernie
- Released: 1975
- Genre: Children
- Length: 39:36
- Label: Sesame Street

Professional ratings
Review scores
Source	Rating
Allmusic	(3/5)

Bert and Ernie Sing Along is a Sesame Street album released in 1975 that involved the entire cast of humans and Muppets doing a sing-along in Bert and Ernie's bathroom. The songs and dialog were recorded exclusively for this album. A year later, however, elements of this album were re-imaged into a television storyline for the Sesame Street TV program (episode #900). The album was scripted by Joseph A. Bailey and originally conceived as a radio program. Bailey worked on the televised version of the story as well.

The album cover is a little misleading as it shows a happy Bert with Ernie at a piano with sheets of music, while Bert, throughout the album, is mostly anything but happy with the situation.

The entire album was released on CD for the first time on the 3-disc set Old School: Volume 1, with other Sesame Street albums The Sesame Street Book & Record, and Big Bird Sings!

== Album's storyline ==
The album starts out with one of the rare times we hear Bert taking a bath. As he does so, he is heard singing "Yankee Doodle". Eventually, Ernie comes in and pushes their piano into the bathroom and decides to join in, much to Bert's dismay. He starts playing music, which accompanies Bert singing in protest of the whole thing ("I Refuse to Sing Along"), with Ernie, in counterpoint, trying to persuade him to sing along.

After the song, and just as it seems Bert is going to get Ernie and the piano out, David joins them, followed by Gordon and Bob, then by Luis, Maria, and Susan. They would start off by singing "I've Been Working on the Railroad" then Bob, Luis, Maria, and David would do "Old MacDonald Had a Farm". At this point, Bert would start asking for a towel, conceding his bath to be over, but is either ignored or turned down by others because they couldn't access one for him. Over the course of side one, various other Muppets (The Count, Grover, Cookie Monster, Herry Monster, Prairie Dawn, etc.) join the sing-along. A couple of times during the sing-along, The Count tries to sing "Bats in My Belfry", but is justly thrown in the shower.

Side two starts with Luis kicking off something called "What's the Name of That Song", where everybody, including Bert, contributes trying to guess what it is, but they end the song unsuccessfully. David then does a song called "A Very Simple Dance", where he got the whole group involved clapping their hands, stomping their feet, turning around, touching their toes, pulling their ears, flapping their arms, stretching up high, and all falling down.

After various antics, at the end of the album, Bert finally sings along with the rest of the cast in "Sing".

The album ends with "Stars and Stripes Forever" in the distance, as Ernie suddenly remembers he also invited the University of Michigan marching band. At that, the door opens and we can hear the band clearer, along with everyone else's sheer delight at their presence, as the album finally fades out.

== Track listing ==
=== Side one ===
No.	Title	Length
1.	"I Refuse to Sing Along"	3:47
2.	"I've Been Working on the Railroad"	1:12
3.	"Old MacDonald Had a Farm"	2:04
4.	"A Really Good Feeling"	2:21
5.	"Bats in My Belfry"	2:05
6.	"Row, Row, Row Your Boat"	0:46
7.	"I'll Give You a Song"	0:13
8.	"Oscar Don't Allow"	1:30
9.	"Limerick Song"	3:15
10.	"On Top of Old Smokey"	1:28
11.	"Living Hand in Hand"	2:58

=== Side two ===
No.	Title	Length
1.	"What's the Name of That Song?"	3:13
2.	"A Very Simple Dance"	2:33
3.	"Morningtown Ride"	2:35
4.	"Everyone Likes Ice Cream"	1:41
5.	"C is for Cookie"	1:15
6.	"Peanuts"	1:24
7.	"John Jacob Jingleheimer Smith"	0:58
8.	"She'll Be Coming 'Round the Mountain"	1:38
9.	"Finale: What's the Name of That Song? (Reprise)"	2:30
10.	"Real Finale: Sing"	1:38
11.	"The Big Finish!: Stars and Stripes Forever"	0:45

== See also ==
- Sesame Street discography
