= Happy Birthday, Cookie Monster =

1986 children's book by Felice Haus

- Author: Felice Haus
- Illustrator: Carol Niclaus
- Language: English
- Genre: children's literature
- Publisher: Random House Children's Books
- Publication date: 1986
- Publication place: United States
- ISBN: 0-394-88182-6

Happy Birthday, Cookie Monster is a children's book written by Felice Haus, with illustrations by Carol Nicklaus, published in 1986 by Random House. The book features Cookie Monster, a character from the PBS children's television series Sesame Street. The book was honored as an International Reading Association Children's Choice.

The book was reissued as part of the Step into Reading series, in Step 1, meant for 4-to 8-year-old children. Cookie Monster's birthday is November 2.

The plot is that Cookie finds himself sad on his birthday after eating all his birthday cake before his party. He doesn't know what he will feed his guests. When his guests arrive, they all bring a cake. In the end, they all have a good time, especially Cookie Monster.

The plot summary on the back of this book reads: "It is Cookie Monster's birthday. He bakes a yummy cake. But he eats it all before the party begins! Now he has no cake to give his friends. What will he do? Find out in this funny story."
