= Robert Kraft (composer) =

American songwriter

- Born: United States
- Genre: Film score
- Occupations: Songwriter, film composer, record producer

Robert Kraft is a songwriter, film composer, recording artist and record producer. He co-produced the 2016 Score: A Film Music Documentary about film composers and the evolution of Hollywood film music.

== Education ==
Kraft attended the Lawrenceville School, graduating in 1972, and graduated cum laude from Harvard University in 1976.

== Recording and songwriting ==
Kraft has worked extensively in the recording industry, producing or co-producing such artists as Linda Ronstadt, Dr. John, Bette Midler, Celia Cruz, Tito Puente, Johnny Mathis, Bruce Willis, Jimmy Buffett, Don Henley, George Benson, Ozzy Osbourne, Southside Johnny, Albert Collins, Vonda Shepard, and Melissa Manchester. His songs have been recorded by The Manhattan Transfer, Bette Midler, Roberta Flack, Los Lobos, Diane Schuur, Bruce Willis, Joy Enriquez, Dr. John, and Kermit the Frog. As a solo artist and with his band, Robert Kraft and The Ivory Coast, he has released four albums on RCA, RSO, and Sonic Edge Records. In October 2013, Milan Records released “Consensual Sets”, a compilation of Kraft's greatest hits from 1979 to 1989. In November 2013, VIVID SOUNDS released a boxed set of Kraft's five original CDs, including "Robert Kraft Live at the Newport Jazz Festival, Town Hall NYC, 1980."

== Film music ==
In 1989, Kraft co-produced the Academy Award-winning song, "Under The Sea", plus the Grammy Award-winning double-platinum soundtrack of The Little Mermaid, along with co-authors Howard Ashman and Alan Menken. In 1992, Kraft was nominated for an Academy Award, a Grammy Award, and a Golden Globe Award for co-writing "Beautiful Maria of My Soul", the theme song from the Warner Bros. feature, The Mambo Kings. Kraft was also the film's composer and Executive Music Producer, producing the Gold soundtrack, which spent four weeks at Number One on Billboard's Latin Music chart. In 1999, Kraft was nominated for a second Golden Globe for co-writing the song, "How Can I Not Love You" for the 20th Century Fox film, Anna and the King, with songwriter Kenneth "Babyface" Edmonds and film composer George Fenton. Kraft also co-produced the long-charting soundtrack on Billboard's Jazz charts, Swing Kids.

As a writer, Kraft's other feature film credits include executive producer, story co-author (with Bruce Willis) and score co-composer (with Michael Kamen) on the Tri-Star film, Hudson Hawk. He produced the Grammy-nominated soundtrack for the Jim Henson Productions' film, The Muppet Christmas Carol, and composed the score to the Warner Bros. feature, Seven Minutes in Heaven. Kraft was songwriter and musical producer on Adventures in Babysitting and Heartbreak Hotel. His television credits include co-writing theme songs for Who's The Boss? and Day by Day, as well as writing new themes for Wide World of Sports and songs for Fame.

Kraft composed the music for the ballet, "Thriller", choreographed by Matthew Diamond. (World Premier, Jacob's Pillow August 1981.) In 1992 Kraft founded the record label, Jim Henson Records, and as the vice president of music at Jim Henson Productions, inaugurated their music division.

== Fox Filmed Entertainment ==
Kraft was the chief executive of Fox Music Inc. from 1994 until October 2012, supervising the scores and soundtracks for over 300 Fox Filmed Entertainment motion pictures. These soundtracks include Titanic, Moulin Rouge!, Avatar, Slumdog Millionaire, and Life of Pi, Once, Juno, Black Swan, and Alvin and the Chipmunks. Kraft's division, Fox Music, also supervised the music for "Ally McBeal" and "X-Files", as well as shows "24", "American Dad!", "Family Guy", and "The Simpsons". Since 1994, television soundtracks from Fox Music have included the worldwide platinum albums from "Ally McBeal" and "X-Files", plus hit compilations from "Buffy the Vampire Slayer", "Dark Angel", "The Simpsons", "Roswell" and "24".

Since Kraft became chief executive in 1994, Fox Music was responsible for the worldwide sales of over 60 million albums, producing 3 Platinum, 6 Multi-Platinum and 6 Gold records. Under his leadership, Fox Music garnered 10 Academy Award nominations, winning 4 Academy Awards, 20 Golden Globe nominations (including 5 Golden Globe Awards), 61 Emmy nominations with 11 wins, and 49 Grammy nominations including 14 Grammy Awards.

== Other projects ==
In 1994, Kraft was elected to the National Academy of Recording Arts and Sciences' board of governors, Los Angeles Chapter. In 1995, Kraft became a member of the Music Branch of the Academy of Motion Picture Arts and Sciences. Kraft was honored with the City of Hope Spirit of Life Award in 2002, and with the T.J. Martell Foundation's Spirit of Excellence in the Arts Award in 2010. As co-chairman of the Grammy Host Committee for the 2001 Grammy Awards in Los Angeles, Kraft and co-chair Tim Leiweke raised money to support Grammy In The Schools. In addition, Kraft founded entermusic.org in 2001, a Music Mentoring organization affiliated with Hamilton High School in Los Angeles.

Kraft is the Berklee College of Music Visiting Professor of Music and Media, (International campus-Valencia, Spain); He is also an executive board member of the World Soundtrack Academy, where he was awarded the World Soundtrack Academy Industry Award for 2012, and is on the board of the International Radio Festival, where he won the International Radio Festival Lifetime Achievement Award for 2012. In 2022, Kraft was elected to the Academy of Motion Picture Arts and Sciences’ Music Branch Executive Committee. In May 2024, Kraft was appointed the inaugural Ambassador to Hollywood at SOCAN (the Society of Composers, Authors and Music Publishers of Canada). In this role, he supports music creators, strengthens industry connections in Los Angeles, and provides career guidance for Canadian film and TV composers.

== Kraftbox Entertainment ==
In 2013, Kraft founded Kraftbox Entertainment. The film, "SCORE! The Film Music Documentary", co-produced by Kraft, premiered at film festivals around the world in 2016, and, upon its 2017 release, entered the iTunes documentary chart at #1, where it stayed for 4 weeks.

Other Kraftbox projects include When Albums Ruled the World, a documentary broadcast on BBC 4 (February 2013). In 2014, Kraft co-produced the hit Off-Broadway one-man show, "The Lion", starring Benjamin Scheuer. In 2015, Kraft signed singer, songwriter, and trumpeter Spencer Ludwig to Warner Bros. Records, and became Spencer's manager. Spencer's first WB Records single, "Diggy" (released July 2016) was the theme song for Target's Fall 2016 ad campaign.
