= Hiroshi Suzuki =

Hiroshi Suzuki may refer to:

- Hiroshi Suzuki (swimmer) (鈴木 弘; born 1933), Japanese swimmer
- Hiroshi Suzuki (trombonist) (1933–2020), Japanese trombonist
- Hiroshi Suzuki (鈴木 寛; born 1966), better known as Papaya Suzuki, Japanese actor, dancer and television personality
- Hiroshi Suzuki (bobsledder) (鈴木 寛; born 1973), Japanese bobsledder
- Hiroshi Suzuki (baseball) (鈴木 博志; born 1997), Japanese baseball player
- Hiroshi Suzuki (cinematographer), on films such as Love Letter
- Hiroshi Suzuki, CEO of the Japanese corporation Hoya Corporation
- Hiroshi Suzuki, CEO of the Japanese corporation skip Ltd.
- Hiroshi Suzuki, President & CEO of the Toshiba Samsung Storage Technology Corporation
- Hiroshi Suzuki (diplomat), Japanese diplomat and ambassador to the United kingdom
- Hiroshi Suzuki (silversmith), Japanese-born silversmith
