= The Muppet Show 2 =

Soundtrack album by The Muppets
- Released: February 6, 1978
- Recorded: 1977
- Genre: Soundtrack
- Label: Pye Records; Arista (USA)
- Producer: Jim Henson and Peter Harris

The Muppets chronology
The Muppet Show (1977)	The Muppet Show 2 (1978)	The Muppet Movie: Original Soundtrack Recording (1979)

The Muppet Show 2 is the second soundtrack album released from the TV show of the same name. It follows the same format of sketches and songs as the first album, but also includes guest-star appearances by Bernadette Peters and Peter Sellers.

== Track listing ==
=== Side A ===
1. "The Muppet Show Theme"
2. "Baby Face"
3. "There's a New Sound"
4. "A Monologue by Fozzie Bear"
5. "Cuanto Le Gusta"
6. "Who?"
7. "Time in a Bottle"
8. "An Editorial by Sam the Eagle"
9. "Borneo"
10. "At the Dance"
11. "Upidee"
12. "Just One Person" (with Bernadette Peters)

=== Side B ===
1. "Happy Feet"
2. "Pigs in Space"
3. "I'm Five"
4. "Sea Chantey"
5. "New York State of Mind"
6. "The Pig Calypso"
7. "When"
8. "A Gypsy's Violin" (with Peter Sellers)
9. "Wishing Song"
10. "Animal Sings Gershwin"
11. "For What It's Worth"
12. "We Got Us"
13. "Closing Theme"
- The album also ends with Kermit locking up the theater after everyone is assumed to be out, and he and Miss Piggy leave for dinner. After about 30 seconds, it is revealed that Fozzie Bear was forgotten about and is left locked in the theater with the lights out. He then starts plaintively repeating "Help". On the original vinyl recording, the side ended in a locked groove loop, so his 'Help' would repeat indefinitely.

== Muppet performers ==
- Jim Henson as Kermit the Frog, Rowlf the Dog, Link Hogthrob and Waldorf
- Frank Oz as Fozzie Bear, Miss Piggy, Animal and Sam Eagle
- Jerry Nelson as Floyd Pepper, Robin, and Dr. Strangepork
- Richard Hunt as Scooter, Statler and Janice
- Dave Goelz as Gonzo and Zoot
- Louise Gold as Zelda Rose and others

== Weekly charts ==
Chart (1978)	Peak position
UK Albums Chart	16

== Certifications ==
Region	Certification	Certified units/sales
United Kingdom (BPI)	Silver	60,000^{^}
^{^} Shipments figures based on certification alone.
