= Bein' Green =

1970 song written by Joe Raposo, originally performed by Jim Henson as Kermit the Frog

- Kermit the Frog singing "Bein' Green" in episode 219 of The Muppet Show

Song by Kermit the Frog (Jim Henson)
- Published: 1970
- Songwriter: Joe Raposo

"Bein' Green" (also known as "It's Not Easy Bein' Green") is a song written by Joe Raposo, originally performed by Jim Henson as Kermit the Frog on both Sesame Street and The Muppet Show (in the episodes "Peter Ustinov" and "Peter Sellers"). It later was covered by Ray Charles, Frank Sinatra, Van Morrison, and other performers. "Bein' Green" is considered the signature song of Kermit the Frog.

== Background ==
In the Muppets version, Kermit begins by lamenting his green coloration, expressing that green "blends in with so many ordinary things" and wishing to be some other color. But by the end of the song, Kermit recalls positive associations with the color green, and concludes by accepting and embracing his color.

== Versions ==
- Jim Henson as Kermit the Frog, various Muppet productions, starting with The Sesame Street Book & Record in 1970, until 1990 following Henson's death
- Steve Whitmire as Kermit the Frog, various Muppet productions (1990–2016)
- Thurl Ravenscroft, 1970 album Rubber Duckie and Other Songs From Sesame Street
- Frank Sinatra, 1971 album Sinatra & Company, this recording would later be used on Sesame Street in an animated insert by Étienne Delessert.
- Lena Horne, 1971 album Nature's Baby
- Urbie Green, 1972 album Bein' Green
- Buddy Rich, 1972 album Stick It
- Van Morrison, 1973 album Hard Nose the Highway
- Stan Kenton, 1973 7.5 on the Richter Scale, titled "It's Not Easy Bein' Green"
- Della Reese, 1973 album Let Me in Your Life
- John Leyton, 1973 eponymous album
- Diana Ross, 1974 album Live at Caesars Palace
- Arthur Fiedler and the Boston Pops Orchestra, 1974 album You Will Be My Music
- Ray Charles, 1975 album Renaissance; this version gained popularity because of an episode of The Cosby Show, and Charles then sang a duet with Kermit on Sesame Street and The Cher Show as well as sang the song on the 1989 special Sesame Street... 20 Years & Still Counting
- Jackie McLean, 1978 album New Wine in Old Bottles
- Mary O'Hara, 1981 album Colours
- Hiroshi Suzuki, 1982 album Now in the Night
- Keith Harris and Orville the Duck, 1983 single
- William Roy, 1986 single "When I Sing Alone"
- Helen Merrill feat. Stan Getz, 1989 album Just Friends
- Wilford Brimley, 1989 MDA Labor Day Telethon
- Mandy Patinkin, 1990 album Dress Casual
- Caroll Spinney as Big Bird, 1990 Jim Henson memorial service
- Bob McGrath, 1991 album Bob's Favorite Street Songs
- Rowlf the Dog, 1993 album Ol' Brown Ears is Back
- Jill O'Hara, 1993 album Jill O'Hara, titled "Green"
- Shirley Horn, 1993 album Light Out of Darkness (A Tribute to Ray Charles)
- Don Henley with Kermit, 1994 album Kermit Unpigged
- Mike Campbell, 1994 album Easy Chair Jazz
- Vanessa Rubin, 1995 album Vanessa Rubin Sings
- Johnny Lytle, 1997 album Easy Easy, completely instrumental
- Don Rickles, 1997 Muppets Tonight episode 205
- Tony Bennett, 1998 album The Playground
- Alan Muraoka, 2000 Evening at Pops
- Calvin Ray Johnson and Kermit 2001 The Jerry Lewis MDA Labor Day Telethon
- Caroll Spinney as Oscar the Grouch, 2005 episode Sesame Street,(with altered Grouchy lyrics by Christine Ferraro)
- Mark Murphy, 2005 album 'Once To Every Heart', (Verve Records)
- Audra McDonald, 2006 album Build a Bridge
- Sophie Milman, 2007 album Make Someone Happy
- Matthew White, Music and Sweet Poetry Agree
- Take 6, 2008 album The Standard
- Abelardo Montoya, 2009 episode in Spanish "Ser Verde" Plaza Sésamo
- Andrew Bird, 2011 tribute/cover album Muppets: The Green Album
- Brenna Whitaker, 2015 album We Love Disney
- Imelda May and the RTÉ Concert Orchestra at a televised live event to mark the centenary of the 1916 Easter Rising
- Matt Vogel as Kermit the Frog, 2018 The Jim Henson Retrospectacle Live in Concert
- Matt Vogel as Kermit the Frog and Elvis Costello, 2019 TV special Sesame Street's 50th Anniversary Celebration
- Jazz at Lincoln Center Orchestra, 2019 album Jazz for Kids
- Suzzy Roche and Lucy Wainwright Roche 2020 album I Can Still Hear You.
- Matt Vogel as Kermit with Lucas Ross on banjo, 2024 UMD College of Arts and Humanities' Dean's Lecture Series'
- Eric Jacobson as Oscar the Grouch and Cynthia Erivo, 2024 on "Sesame Street's YouTube channel (uses altered lyrics from Season 36 version)."
- Seth MacFarlane, 2026 album Seth MacFarlane Sings the Muppets

== Memorial ==
The song was sung by Big Bird (Caroll Spinney) at the two memorial services for Jim Henson in 1990.

== In politics ==
In September 2021, UK Prime Minister Boris Johnson mentioned the song while giving an address about climate to the United Nations General Assembly, saying that Kermit was wrong and "it is easy to be green".

== See also ==
- "Rainbow Connection"
