= Jim Henson Records =

- Parent company: The Jim Henson Company
- Founded: 1992; 33 years ago
- Defunct: 1994; 31 years ago
- Genre: Soundtrack, Children's
- Country of origin: United States
- Location: United States

Jim Henson Records was an American record company established in 1992 by The Jim Henson Company in an agreement with Bertelsmann Music Group. Robert Kraft was selected to run the label. The first album released by Jim Henson Records was the soundtrack to the film The Muppet Christmas Carol in 1992.

== See also ==
- List of record labels
