= Joe Raposo =

American composer (1937–1989)

Joe Raposo OIH

Background information
- Born: Joseph Guilherme Raposo; February 8, 1937; Fall River, Massachusetts, U.S.
- Died: February 5, 1989 (aged 51) Bronxville, New York, U.S.
- Genres: Jazz, blues
- Occupations: Composer; lyricist; songwriter; pianist; music director
- Instruments: Vocals, keyboards
- Years active: 1965–1989
- Spouse: Pat Collins (m. 1976)

Joseph Guilherme Raposo, OIH (February 8, 1937 – February 5, 1989) was an American composer and songwriter. He is best known for his work on the children's television series Sesame Street, for which he wrote the theme song, and several notable songs, including "Bein' Green", "C Is For Cookie" and "Sing" (later a #3 hit for The Carpenters). He also wrote music for other television shows including The Electric Company, Shining Time Station and the sitcoms Three's Company and The Ropers, including their theme songs. Additionally, he composed scores for three Dr. Seuss television specials produced by DePatie–Freleng Enterprises: Halloween Is Grinch Night (1977), Pontoffel Pock, Where Are You? (1980), and The Grinch Grinches the Cat in the Hat (1982).

== Early life and education ==
Raposo was born in Fall River, Massachusetts, as the only child of Joseph Soares Raposo and Maria "Sarah" da Ascenção Vitorino Raposo, who immigrated to the U.S. from São Miguel (Azores), Portugal. Within his family, he was known by the nickname "Sonny". His father, Joseph Sr., was a musician proficient in classical guitar, violin, flute, and piano, and also worked as a music teacher. He was Raposo’s first music instructor.

Raposo graduated from B.M.C. Durfee High School in Fall River and received his undergraduate degree from Harvard College in 1958, where he composed music for several Hasty Pudding Club productions. He later studied at the École Normale de Musique de Paris under the tutelage of Nadia Boulanger.

== Career ==
=== Early years ===
Raposo worked in musical theater both before and after his involvement with the Children's Television Workshop and Sesame Street. It was in the context of musical theater that he first met future collaborator Jim Henson. During the mid-1960s, Raposo performed in piano bars in Boston and served as a pianist and music director for a jazz trio at WNAC-TV in Boston.

Raposo moved to New York City in 1965. He served as the musical supervisor and arranger for the original off-Broadway 1967 production of You're a Good Man, Charlie Brown, and contributed additional music to the show. He also composed the theme music for WABC-TV's The 4:30 Movie. The piece, titled "Moving Pictures," was later used for other movie presentations on WABC-TV and other ABC owned-and-operated stations.

=== Sesame Street ===
Raposo is widely recognized for his work on Sesame Street, composing songs for the program from its debut in 1969 through the mid-1970s, and again during the 1980s. He wrote the show's theme song "Can You Tell Me How to Get to Sesame Street?", as well as several of its most well-known songs, including "Bein' Green", "C Is for Cookie", and "Sing". A version of "Sing" recorded by The Carpenters in 1973 reached number 3 on the Billboard Hot 100 chart. Raposo also composed much of the background music used in the show’s film segments and frequently performed the vocals for these pieces.

In addition to his musical work, Raposo portrayed various uncredited stock characters on Sesame Street during the early 1970s. According to his son, Nicholas Raposo, in a 2002 interview, these performances typically involved humorous, unnamed roles featured in short film segments. Raposo also provided voice-overs for select animated segments.

The Sesame Street character Don Music featured a framed, autographed promotional photograph of Raposo displayed in his fictional studio.

One of Raposo's compositions for Sesame Street, titled "The Square Song", was used in the 1977 film Close Encounters of the Third Kind.

=== Other work in children's television ===
In 1971, the Children's Television Workshop launched The Electric Company, a television program designed to support reading instruction for children who had aged out of Sesame Street. Raposo served as the musical director for the show's first three seasons and continued to contribute songs throughout its run until 1977. Raposo performed comedic characters for film segments on The Electric Company, similar to his earlier work on Sesame Street.

Raposo performed several character voices in the television special Pontoffel Pock, Where Are You?.

The HBO animated adaptation of Madeline, for which Raposo composed the music and songs in collaboration with Judy Rothman, was broadcast four months after his death. Around the same time, the animated series The Smoggies, for which Raposo composed the theme song, premiered in Canada.

=== Additional film, stage and other television work ===
Although primarily known for his work in live-action and animated children's television, Joe Raposo had aspirations to become a composer for Broadway musicals.

In 1962, Raposo composed music for A Man’s a Man, using Eric Bentley’s English-language translations of song texts and poems from Bertolt Brecht’s play Man Equals Man. The production was staged at the Loeb Drama Center in Cambridge, Massachusetts, and later at the Masque Theatre in New York City. Portions of the performance were broadcast on CBS, and the full production was recorded and released in 1974.

In the 1970s, Raposo composed the original score for the animated film Raggedy Ann & Andy: A Musical Adventure. He subsequently collaborated with playwright William Gibson on a stage musical about Raggedy Ann. This production became the first theatrical performance from a United States company to be staged in the Soviet Union following the resumption of cultural exchanges between the two nations. The musical later had a limited Broadway run in 1986.

Raposo also worked with lyricist Sheldon Harnick on a musical adaptation of the 1946 film It's a Wonderful Life. Titled A Wonderful Life, the musical was first performed at the University of Michigan in 1986 and later staged at Arena Stage in Washington, D.C., in 1991. A concert version was performed on Broadway for one night on December 12, 2005, featuring Brian Stokes Mitchell, David Hyde Pierce, and Judy Kuhn.

In addition to his work in theater and children’s programming, Raposo composed theme music for several television sitcoms, including Ivan the Terrible, Three’s Company, The Ropers, and Foot in the Door. He also composed scores for films such as The Possession of Joel Delaney (1972), Savages (1972), and Maurie (1973), as well as for documentaries, including Peter Rosen’s America Is, for which he also served as on-screen narrator.

== Musical style and influences ==
Raposo was a fan of Spike Jones. Raposo composed several pieces for Sesame Street influenced by Jones, frequently featuring instruments such as kazoo, siren whistles, bulb horns, and tenor banjos. One of Raposo's compositions, "Doggy Paddle," includes him imitating the sounds of barking dogs during the instrumental section, referencing the musical style of the barking dog chorus in "Memories Are Made of This" by Spike Jones and His City Slickers.

Raposo's songwriting often reflected themes of introspection, particularly related to life and nature. While he was widely known for his upbeat compositions in major keys, he also demonstrated skill in arranging original blues, country, and jazz pieces, frequently incorporating melancholic lyrical content within otherwise cheerful songs.

Classically trained as a conductor and arranger, Raposo developed his piano technique while at École Normale de Musique in Paris. His compositions featured recurring elements such as optimistic lyrical references and the use of piccolo and glockenspiel. A notable aspect of Raposo's musical technique was his ability to replicate the sound and style of a 20th-century player piano in live performance.

== Personal life ==
Raposo was married twice. From his first marriage, he had two sons, Joseph and Nicholas. From his second marriage to Pat Collins, he had a son, Andrew, and a daughter, Elizabeth.

Raposo maintained a close friendship with Frank Sinatra. In 1973, Sinatra recorded four of Raposo's songs for his album Ol’ Blue Eyes Is Back. Sinatra initially intended the album to consist entirely of Raposo’s compositions, but the record label limited the inclusion to four tracks. Broadcaster Jonathan Schwartz said that Sinatra admired Raposo and actively promoted his music. During the 1960s, Sinatra frequently attended gatherings hosted by Raposo and his first wife, Susan, at their New York apartment. In his memoir, Schwartz recounted that Sinatra was particularly impressed by Raposo's piano skills and often referred to him with phrases such as "Raposo at the piano" or "the genius".

== Death and legacy ==
Raposo died on February 5, 1989, in Bronxville, New York, from non-Hodgkin lymphoma, three days before his 52nd birthday.

According to individuals who knew him, Raposo had a strong preference for sweets, particularly cookies. Following his death, Collins-Sarnoff held a memorial reception that featured milk and cookies.

Raposo was the subject of a memorial documentary titled Sing! Sesame Street Remembers Joe Raposo and His Music, which aired in April 1990 and was hosted and directed by Sesame Street producer Jon Stone. A tribute album honoring his contributions to Sesame Street, Sing: Songs of Joe Raposo was released in 1992.

In 1998, a collection of his manuscripts was donated by Collins to the Georgetown University Library.

== Credits and lectures ==
Film Scores – Composer

- Steinbeck in Memoriam (1966)
- The Frog Prince (1971) (TV movie)
- The Possession of Joel Delaney (1972)
- Savages (1973)
- Big Mo (1974)
- Raggedy Ann & Andy: A Musical Adventure (1977)
- The Great Muppet Caper (1981)

Television – Musical Director and/or Composer/Lyricist/Producer

- Sesame Street (1969–1989)
- The Electric Company (1971–1974)
- Visions (1974–1979)
- Metromedia Television (1967–1969)

Theme Songs – Composer or Composer/Lyricist

- Sesame Street
- The Electric Company
- Three's Company
- We'll Get By
- The Ropers
- Shining Time Station
- Madeline
- Steampipe Alley
- The Dr. Fad Show
- CBS Morning News television specials – Music Director/Composer
- America Is (CBS – Emmy Award for Outstanding Children's Program)
- Curious George
- Pontoffel Pock (Dr. Seuss)
- Cabbage Patch Kids' First Christmas TV Special – Composer/Lyricist
- A Wonderful Life, with Sheldon Harnick
- Raggedy Ann, with William Gibson
- You're a Good Man Charlie Brown, incidental music with Charles Schulz and Clark Gesner
- Half a Sixpence, with Tommy Steele
- Play It Again, Sam, with Woody Allen
- House of Flowers, incidental music with Harold Arlen and Truman Capote
- The Mad Show, with David Steinberg and Linda Lavin
- The Office, with Jerome Robbins
- The Smoggies

Lecturer

- Massachusetts Institute of Technology (MIT)
- Yale University
- Harvard Graduate School of Education
- New York University
- Southern Methodist University

== Awards and nominations ==
Academy Awards

Year	Nominated work	Category	Result
1981	"The First Time it Happens" (from The Great Muppet Caper)	Best Music (Original Song)	Nominated

Grammy Awards

Year	Album	Category	Result
1973	The Electric Company	Best Recording for Children	Won
1973	Sesame Street II	Best Recording for Children	Nominated
1974	Sesame Street Live!	Best Recording for Children	Won
1980	Sesame Disco!	Best Recording for Children	Nominated

Primetime Emmy Awards

Year	Nominated work	Category	Result
1970	Sesame Street (for the song "This Way to Sesame Street")	Outstanding Achievement in Children’s Programming (Individuals)	Won
1973	Sesame Street	Outstanding Achievement in Children’s Programming (Individuals)	Nominated
1989	Sesame Street… 20 Years & Still Counting (for "Look Through the Window")	Outstanding Achievement in Music & Lyrics	Won

== See also ==
- Sesame Street discography
- List of songs from Sesame Street
