= Cookie Monster =

Sesame Street character

- Sesame Street character
- Cookie Monster singing his signature song "C Is For Cookie"
- First appearance: 1966; 60 years ago: unaired Wheels, Crowns and Flutes commercials (as the Wheels-stealer)
- Created by: Jim Henson
- Performed by: Frank Oz (1969–2004); David Rudman (2001–present)
- Birthday: November 2

In-universe information
- Full name: Sid Monster
- Aliases: Alistair Cookie, Arnold, Wheel-Stealer
- Species: Muppet monster
- Gender: Male

Sid "Cookie" Monster is a Muppet character on the PBS and Netflix children's television series Sesame Street. A furry blue monster, he is best known for his voracious appetite and his famous eating catchphrases, such as "Me want cookie!" As his name suggests, his preferred food is cookies, although he eats almost anything. Chocolate chip cookies are his favorite kind of cookies. Oatmeal cookies are his second favorite. His speech is often grammatically nonstandard; for example, he always uses "Me" to refer to himself in place of "I", "My", and "Mine". Despite his voracious appetite for cookies, Cookie Monster shows awareness of healthy eating habits for young children and also enjoys fruits and vegetables.

In a song in 2004, and later in an interview in 2017, Cookie Monster revealed his real name as "Sid", though in the first season he was referred to as both "tiny" and "Harry". He is known to have a father, a mother, a younger sister, and a cousin, identical in design; the latter two do not like cookies. All four share his characteristic blue fur and "googly eyes". His father appeared in a Monsterpiece Theater sketch promoting energy conservation, water conservation and environmentalism. Cookie Monster's mother and father both share his enormous appetite and craving for cookies.

== Origin ==
The book Jim Henson's Designs and Doodles explains Cookie Monster's origin: "In 1966, Henson drew three monsters that ate cookies and appeared in a Canadian General Foods commercial that featured three crunchy snack foods: Wheels, Crowns and Flutes. Each snack was represented by a different monster. The Wheel-Stealer was a short, fuzzy monster with wonky eyes and sharply pointed teeth. The Flute-Snatcher was a speed demon with a long, sharp nose and windblown hair. The Crown-Grabber was a hulk of a monster with a Boris Karloff accent and teeth that resembled giant knitting needles."

"These monsters had insatiable appetites for the snack foods they were named after. Each time the Muppet narrator, a human-looking fellow, fixes himself a tray of Wheels, Flutes and Crowns, they disappear before he can eat them. One by one, the monsters sneak in and zoom away with the snacks. Frustrated and peckish, the narrator warns viewers that these pesky monsters could be disguised as someone in your own home, at which point the monsters briefly turn into people and then dissolve back to monsters again."

As it turns out, these commercials were never aired — but all three monsters had a future in the Muppet cast. The "Crown-Grabber" was used in a sketch on The Ed Sullivan Show, in which he ruins a girl's beautiful day. Known from then on as the Beautiful Day Monster, he made a number of appearances on Sesame Street and The Muppet Show. The "Flute-Snatcher" turned into Snake Frackle, a background monster from The Great Santa Claus Switch and The Muppet Show.

In 1967, Henson used the "Wheel-Stealer" puppet for an IBM training film, Coffee Break Machine. In the sketch, "The Computer Dinner", the monster (with frightening eyes and fangs) devours a complex coffee-making machine as it describes its different parts. When he is finished, the machine announces the monster has activated the machine's anti-vandalism system, which contains the most powerful explosives known to man. The monster promptly explodes. This sketch was also performed in October 1967 on The Ed Sullivan Show. It was also later performed on the George Burns episode of The Muppet Show using the Luncheon Counter Monster.

Vintage Jim Henson Commercials — Munchos

Two years later, Henson used a similarly-designed and equally hungry monster for three commercials selling Munchos, a Frito-Lay potato snack. This time, the puppet was named Arnold, the Munching Monster. After the three ads were produced, Henson had the opportunity to renew the contract. He chose not to, because at that point it seemed that the character was becoming popular on its own. He was working on Sesame Street — and that monster puppet was moving on to the next stage in its career. According to Frank Oz, in a later routine the then unnamed monster won a quiz show and for winning was "given the choice of $10,000 cash, a new car, a trip to Hawaii, or a cookie." He took the cookie and from then on he was Cookie Monster.

Cookie Monster, still unnamed, made his Sesame Street debut in the first episode, interfering with Kermit the Frog's "famous W lecture" by eating a model "W" bit by bit. He turns it into an "N", a "V", and finally an "I", to Kermit's frustration. He then tries to eat Kermit.

It was during the first season that Cookie Monster got his name and began using the growly vernacular (e.g., "Me eat cookie!") that would become part of his character. His signature song, "C Is For Cookie", was first aired during the 1971–72 season, and it became one of the best-known songs from Sesame Street.

== Cookies and nutrition ==
Over the years, different approaches to the cookies have been tried. The cookies must be thin and soft so they shatter satisfactorily, preferably into many pieces. They must also not make a mess on the expensive puppet. The ones made of rice crackers crumbled well, but the crumbs tended to stick to Cookie Monster's fur. Artificial foam cookies did not look like cookies when they broke apart. In 2000, Lara MacLean developed a fat-free cookie recipe with no added sugar. The main ingredients are dry pancake mix, puffed rice, Grape-Nuts cereal, and instant coffee (for color), mixed together with water and decorated with brown hot glue (to look like chocolate chips or raisins). The glue is inedible, and the edible parts of the cookie do not have an appealing flavor.

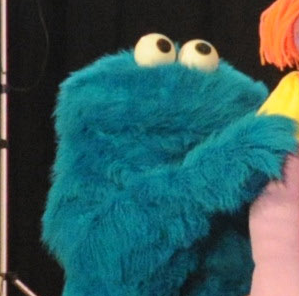
A costume character of Cookie Monster in a 2011 live show

In 2005, in response to growing concerns about record levels of childhood obesity in the United States, Sesame Street began airing segments titled Healthy Habits for Life. In these segments, the Muppet characters of Sesame Street talk about healthy habits, such as eating properly and exercising. The Healthy Habits for Life segments spawned Internet rumors that Cookie Monster's name had been changed to Veggie Monster or would be taken off the show entirely. Since then, Cookie Monster has eaten not only cookies (and the plate they are served on) but also fruits and vegetables. There is a small hole in the puppet's mouth, so that something like an apple or banana can be "swallowed" by the puppet.

In a 2007 appearance on Martha Stewart's TV program, Cookie Monster explained his new philosophy that "Cookies are a sometimes food."

On February 10, 2008, NPR host Elizabeth Blair interviewed Cookie Monster for the All Things Considered segment In Character. He answered the Proust Questionnaire, as well as revealing some of his favorite and non-favorite things.

In a June 19, 2008, appearance on The Colbert Report, Cookie Monster again explained that "Cookies are a sometimes food." Colbert had asked agitatedly why Cookie Monster had "abandoned the pro-cookie agenda" and thus caused fruit to become the favorite snack of American children, according to a study Colbert had heard. Colbert criticized Cookie Monster for not wearing a cookie lapel pin. Cookie Monster also claimed to have "crazy times during the '70s and '80s", referring to himself as "the Robert Downey Jr. of cookies." After eating a cookie to prove he still likes cookies, Cookie Monster asked if the Peabody Award, a round medallion on a small pedestal, was a cookie. When Colbert returned to speak to Cookie Monster at the end of the show, the award had disappeared and Cookie Monster was wiping his mouth with a napkin.

On November 24, 2010, Cookie Monster started a Facebook page as part of a campaign to host Saturday Night Live. Though his bid to host Saturday Night Live failed, he was allowed to appear with Jeff Bridges when Bridges hosted the show and sang the Christmas song "Silver Bells".

On August 4, 2026, for National Chocolate Cookie Day, Cookie Monster sang "Take Me Out to the Ball Game" during the Seventh-inning stretch at Wrigley Field during the Chicago Cubs baseball game. The Cubs defeated the Los Angeles Dodgers 5-1.

== Select filmography ==
- Sesame Street (1969–present) (TV)
- Christmas Eve on Sesame Street (1978) (TV)
- The Muppet Movie (1979)
- Don't Eat the Pictures (1983) (TV)
- Big Bird in China (1983) (TV)
- The Muppets Take Manhattan (1984)
- Sesame Street Presents: Follow That Bird (1985)
- The Muppets: A Celebration of 30 Years (1986) (TV)
- A Muppet Family Christmas (1987) (TV)
- Big Bird's Birthday or Let Me Eat Cake (1991) (TV)
- Sesame Street Stays Up Late (1993) (TV)
- Elmo Saves Christmas (1996) (TV)
- The Adventures of Elmo in Grouchland (1999)
- Bert and Ernie's Word Play (2002)
- Play with Me Sesame (2003) (TV)
- Sesame Beginnings (2006–2007)
- Abby in Wonderland (2008)
- The Furchester Hotel (2014–2017) (TV)
- The Magical Wand Chase (2017) (TV)
- Sesame Street: Elmo's Playdate (2020) (TV)
- The Monster at the End of This Story (2020) (TV)
- The Not-Too-Late Show with Elmo (2020–2021) (TV)
- See Us Coming Together – A Sesame Street Special (2021) (TV)

== Casting history ==
Main performers

- Frank Oz – From 1969 to 2001; occasionally until 2004
- David Rudman – From 2001 to present

Rudman officially became Cookie Monster's performer in Sesame Street's 2002 season (taped 2001). Oz continued to occasionally perform Cookie Monster until 2004.

== Merchandise ==
Various toys and other icons of the Cookie Monster have been produced over the years. The most obvious is a cookie jar, of which numerous types have been available.

Various children's books featuring Cookie Monster have been published over the years:

- Happy Birthday, Cookie Monster
- Cookie Monster's Kitchen
- Cookie Monster's Christmas
- A Cookie Gone Wrong - Monster's Story
- Biggest Cookie in the World
- Cookie Monster and the Cookie Tree
- Cookie Monster's Good Time to Eat
- Cookie Monster's Blue Book
- Cookie Monster, Where are You?
- Cookie Monster!
- Cookie Monster's Activity Book
- Cookie Monster Mammoth Color
- Cookie Monster's Book of Cookie Shapes
- Monster and the Surprise Cookie
- Sesame Street: Wanted, the Great Cookie Thief

== Cultural references ==
The Cookie Monster, a character familiar to the generations of Sesame Street watchers, is remembered for his gluttony and his deep, rumbly distinctive voice.

=== Immoderation ===
In 1990, U.S. Budget Director Richard Darman wrote an introduction to the federal budget with a section "Green Eyeshades and the Cookie Monster" in which he called Cookie "the quintessential consumer", and the enormous budget "the Ultimate Cookie Monster."

As all monsters are, Cookie Monster was initially intimidating. His manner is gruff and his clumsiness occasionally causes damage. But quickly, Cookie Monster comes to be seen as benign—indeed, downright friendly. He has a few bad habits which can be that he cannot resist gobbling up anything and everything that might be consumed, especially cookies. And he cannot quite control the way he spews forth crumbs. He is the quintessential consumer... The budget, for all its intimidating detail, might be seen similarly: as the Ultimate Cookie Monster. ... Its massive presence might be understood as little more than a compilation of cookies received, cookies crumbled, and crumbs spewed forth. Yet, apt though the Cookie Monster perspective may be, it does not suffice...

— U.S. Budget Director Richard Darman, unpublished version of the introduction to President Bush's 1991 federal budget

In the Food Network program Good Eats episode "Three Chips for Sister Marsha" (first aired December 13, 2000), a puppet named Maj. Wilfred D. Cookie who looks like a green version of Cookie Monster appears. Asked about his well-known "brother", he responds, "I told you never to mention that ruffian. All he knows about cookies is how to shovel them into his face." In the Fox animated series Family Guy episode "Model Misbehavior", Cookie Monster is shown in a psychiatric hospital, repeatedly foiling drug rehab-styled efforts to cure his cookie addiction.

In the Sesame Street parody Avenue Q, the character of Trekkie Monster is loosely based on Cookie Monster, sharing his speech pattern and addictive personality.

We wanted his name to indicate that he was obsessed, like Cookie Monster is obsessed with cookies. So we used "Trekkie" both because it sounded like "cookie" and because Trekkies are, by definition, obsessive fanatics.

— Jeff Marx, Avenue Q composer and lyricist

=== Music ===
The guttural singing style in death metal bands is commonly (if facetiously) compared to Cookie Monster's low-pitched, gravelly voice.

John Lennon's song "Hold On", recorded in 1970 (only a year after Sesame Street debuted), features Lennon shouting "Cookie!" in Cookie Monster's voice, in the middle of the song. Ringo Starr, aware of Lennon's love for Cookie Monster, also screams "Cookie!" in Cookie Monster's voice in his song "Early 1970", released in 1971.

=== Entertainment ===
In the Family Guy episode "Back to the Pilot", due to alterations in the past, Stewie thinks Cookie Monster could have invented Facebook; in this timeline, he would have called it "Cookiebook". In The Empire Strikes Back spoof "Something, Something, Something, Dark Side", Cookie Monster is cast as the Wampa.

In another sci-fi related takeoff, the Star Wars spoof Hardware Wars features "Chewchilla the Wookiee Monster" in the role of Chewbacca.

Cookie Monster also appears in Mad, first in "Mouse M.D", a parody of House M.D., then as the main character in "Cookie Blue", a parody of Rookie Blue.

=== Apple ===
When the Apple personal assistant Siri is asked the question, "what is zero divided by zero", Siri responds with the answer: "Imagine that you have zero cookies and you split them evenly among zero friends. How many cookies does each person get? See? It doesn’t make sense. And Cookie Monster is sad that there are no cookies, and you are sad that you have no friends."

On March 16, 2016, Apple released an ad titled "Timer" starring Cookie Monster, where he uses the "Hey Siri" feature in the iPhone 6S to set a timer and play an album while he waits for cookies to bake.

=== Other ===
A popular internet parody of The Great Wave off Kanagawa, titled "Sea is for Cookie", was created for an Adobe Photoshop competition on Reddit. The piece features the wave with googly eyes and cookies in the crest, resembling Cookie Monster eating cookies. And it is revealed that his real first name was leaked on the Sesame Street episode: "First Time Me Eat Cookie" that reflects on when Cookie Monster ate his first 20 cookies. and in fact one of the lines it doesn't say "Cookie Monster" before he ate the cookies, in fact he was named "Sid" by his parents.

In July 2025, Caitlin Clark debuted a new Player Exclusive (PE) shoe with Nike called "Cookie Monster" in honor of the character and Clark’s own love of chocolate chip cookies. Her Kobe 6 Protro PEs were bright primary blue with a cookie-colored tongue, and promotional pictures featured fuzzy blue shoelaces.

== See also ==
- Cookie Monster Munch
- C Is For Cookie
- Cookie Monster vocals
