= Happy Feet (song) =

1930 popular song

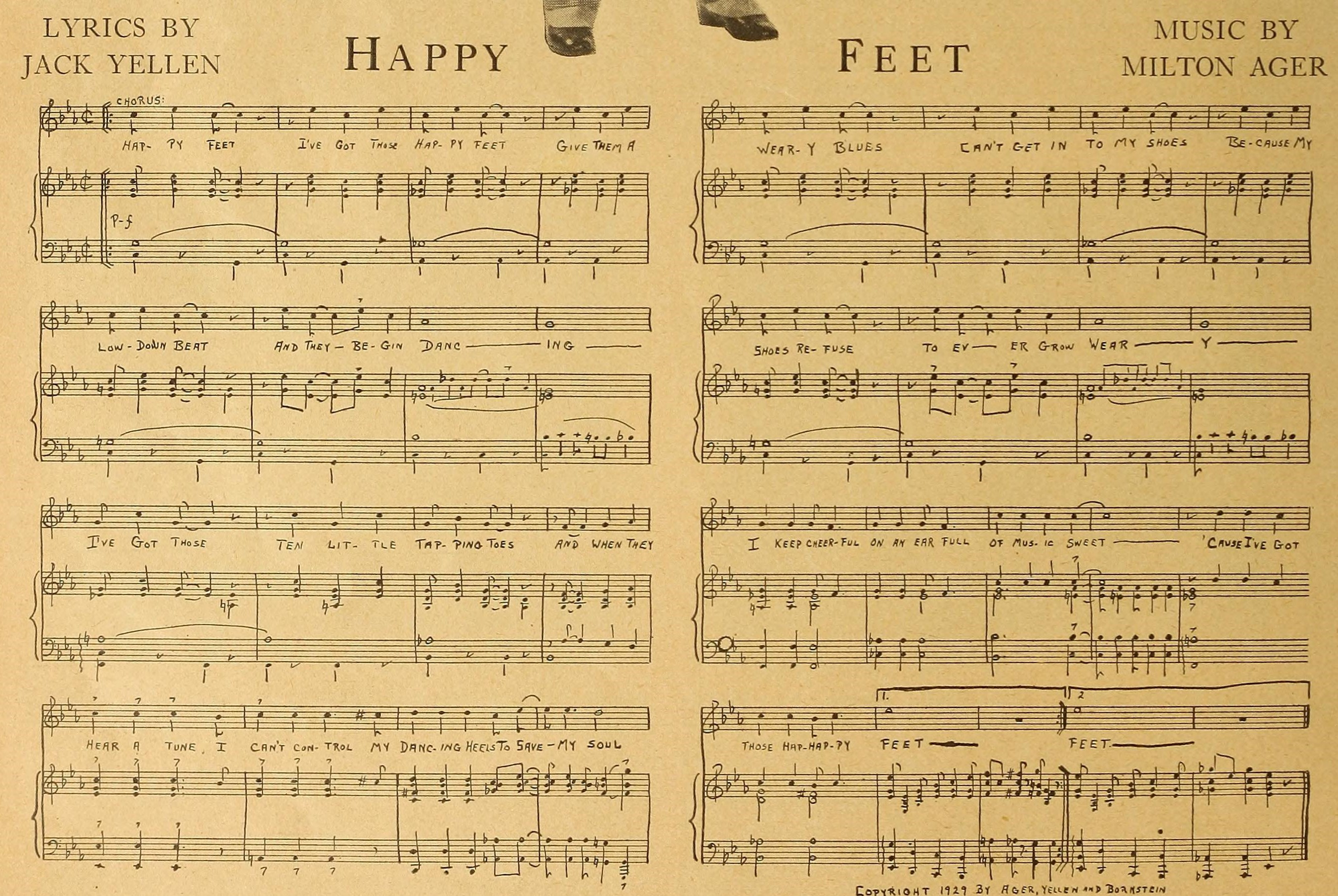

Song by Paul Whiteman and his Orchestra with the Rhythm Boys
- Published: 1930 by Ager, Yellen & Bornstein, Inc.
- Recorded: February 10, 1930
- Genre: Jazz; American Dance Music
- Length: 3:00
- Label: Columbia W149810
- Composer: Milton Ager
- Lyricist: Jack Yellen

"Happy Feet" is a song with music by Milton Ager and lyrics by Jack Yellen, first published in 1930. It was originally introduced in the Universal Pictures revue film King of Jazz (1930), where it was performed by Paul Whiteman and his Orchestra with the Rhythm Boys.

== Background ==
In film, the song was introduced in one of the musical-dancing sequences. It begins with the verse and chorus sung by the Rhythm Boys (featuring future multimedia star Bing Crosby in his onscreen debut) with the Sisters G reprising the chorus in German. The rest of "Happy Feet" sequence contains the latter's dance show along with the Russell Markert Girls. A memorable "rubber legs" solo was danced by Al Norman.

According to the labels on the shellac records, the target dance for the song was a foxtrot.

== Notable recordings ==
Date	Main recording artist	Vocalist(s)	Notes	Ref.
February 10, 1930	Paul Whiteman and his Orchestra	The Rhythm Boys	Featuring Bing Crosby, Harry Barris and Al Rinker.	
April 9, 1930	Leo Reisman and his Orchestra	Lew Conrad		
May 8, 1930	Frankie Trumbauer's Orchestra	Smith Ballew		
May 9, 1930	Jack Hylton and his Orchestra	Pat O’Malley		
May 26, 1930	The Mariners Trio			
October 7, 1930	The Revelers			
October 14, 1930	Cab Calloway and his Orchestra	Cab Calloway		
October 3, 1933	Horace Henderson and his Orchestra	Henry Allen		

Kermit the Frog performed the song in Episode 209 of The Muppet Show. Kermit's rendition is preserved on a number of recordings, including 2002's The Muppet Show: Music, Mayhem, and More.
