= Brox Sisters =

American musical trio

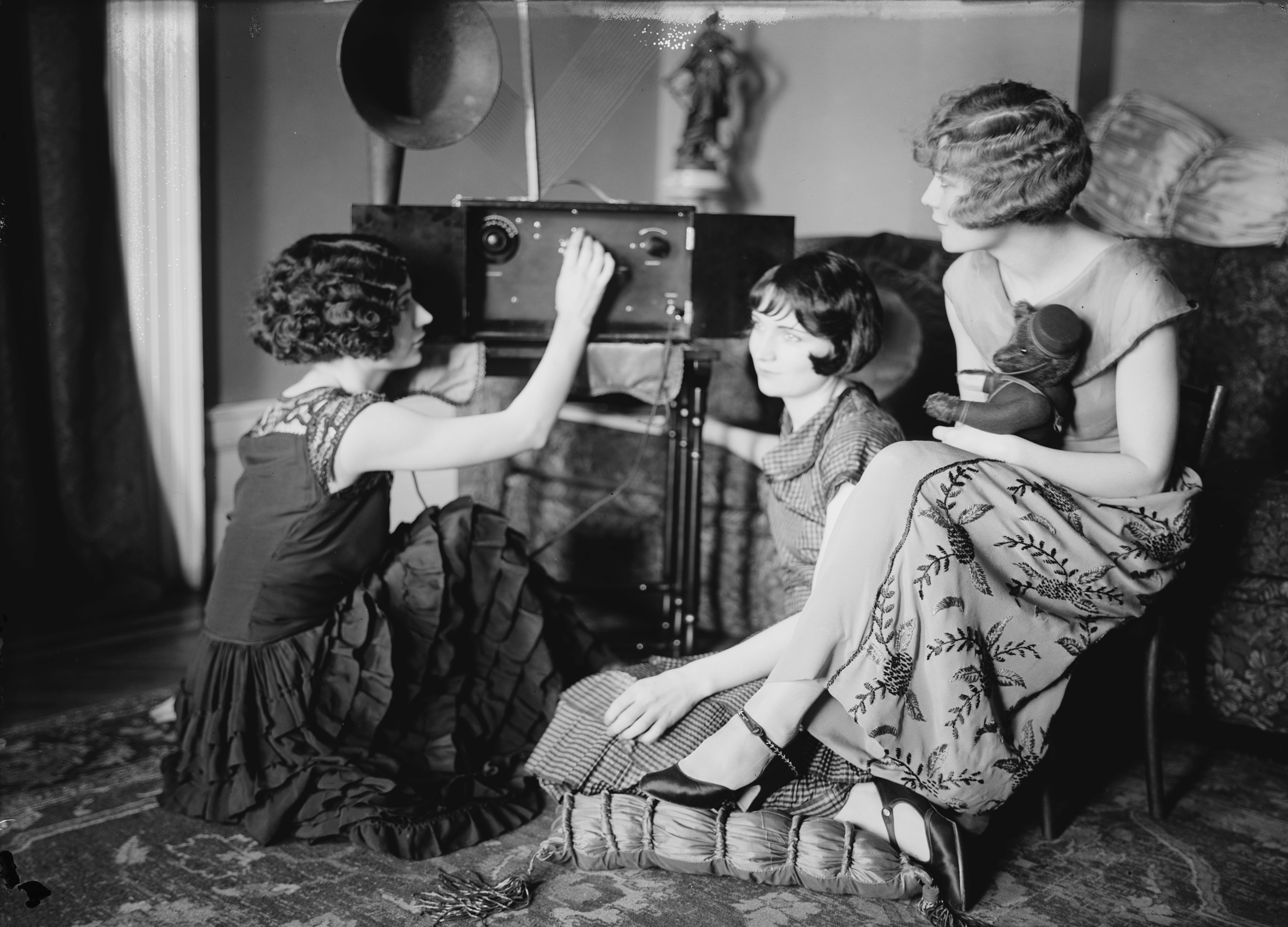
The Brox Sisters tune their radio. Left to right: Patricia, Bobbe, Lorayne (c. mid-1920s).

The Brox Sisters (née Brock) were an American trio of singing sisters, enjoying their greatest popularity in the 1920s and early 1930s.

== Early life ==
The sisters were Lorayne (born Eunice, November 11, 1901 – June 14, 1993), Dagmar (later Bobbe) (born Josephine, November 28, 1902 – May 2, 1999), and Patricia (or Kathlyn, born Kathleen, June 14, 1904 – August 27, 1988). They were born in Iowa and Indiana, grew up in Alberta and Tennessee, and retained Southern accents during their performing careers. The sisters began a singing career as a trio in Canada, first appearing as child performers in Mother Lang's Children's Show.

The family name "Brock" was changed to "Brox" for theater marquees.

The Brox sisters began touring the Vaudeville circuit in the 1910s in the United States and Canada. At the start of the 1920s they achieved success in New York on the Broadway stage. Near the end of the decade they relocated to Los Angeles.

== Broadway ==
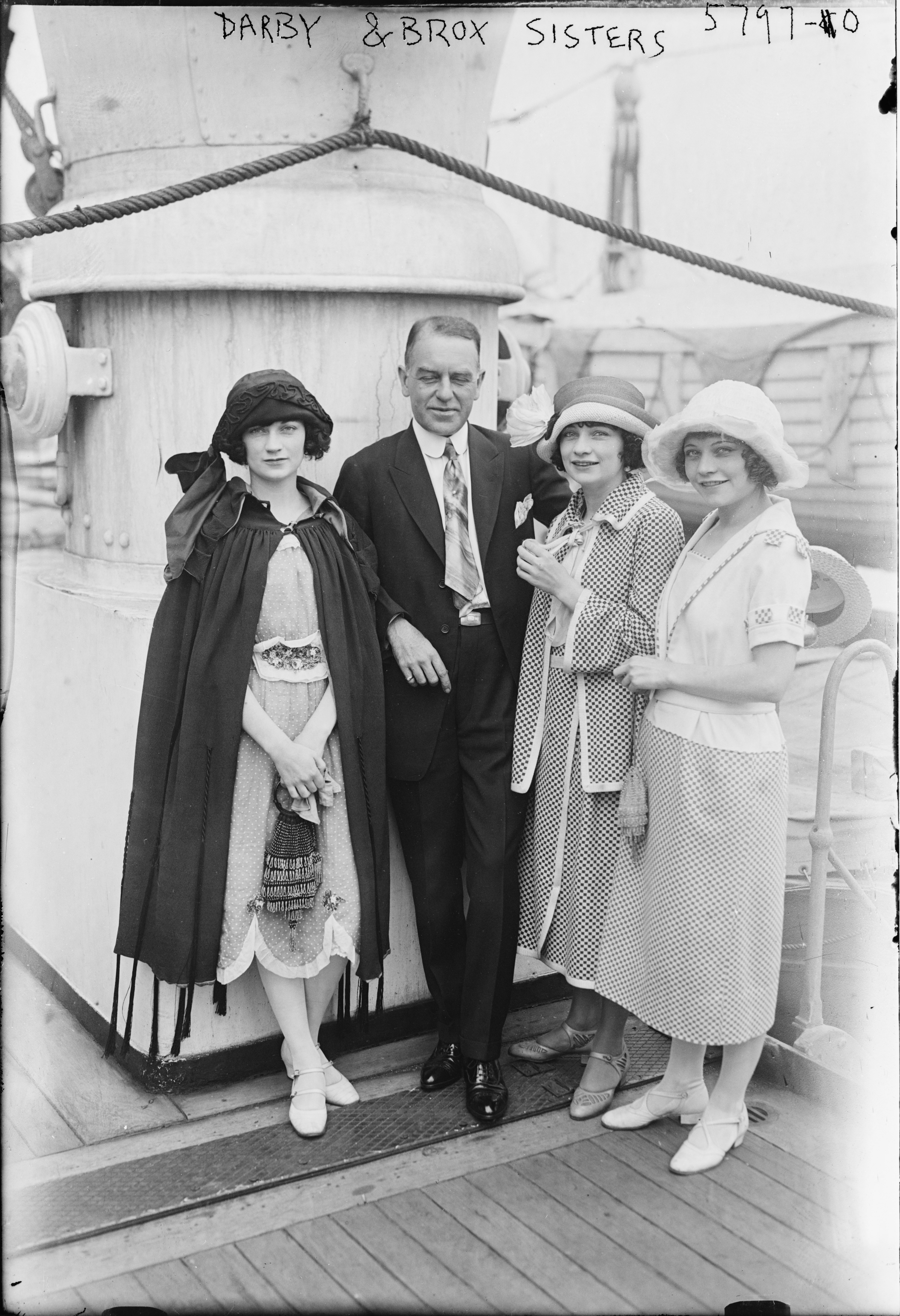
The Brox Sisters c. 1920–1925

The trio performed in Irving Berlin's Music Box Revue from 1921 to 1924, at the New York Theatre. Berlin's hit song "Everybody Step" was written for and debuted by the sisters. They recorded a number of Berlin compositions, including "Bring on the Pepper," "How Many Times," "Lazy," "School House Blues," "Some Sunny Day," and "Tokio Blues."

In 1925 and 1926, they performed on Broadway in the musical comedy The Cocoanuts, with the Marx Brothers. In 1927, they appeared in the Ziegfeld Follies of 1927 at the New Amsterdam Theatre with comedian Eddie Cantor.

== Film history ==
The Brox Sisters were among the earliest artists to appear on Warner Bros.' Vitaphone sound shorts in the late 1920s. They were featured in three productions: Glorifying the American Song and Down South in 1928, and the six-minute short Headin' South in 1929. None of them currently exists in full picture and sound; either the picture or the sound element is missing on each reel, and research is underway to locate the missing components. Down South exists in camera negative at the Library of Congress and a well-used Vitaphone disc was located by Ron Hutchinson of the Vitaphone Project, who raised funding for a restoration at UCLA Film & Television Archive.

In 1929, the Brox Sisters appeared in the MGM feature film The Hollywood Revue of 1929, performing "Singin' in the Rain" (after Cliff Edwards's solo), and "Strike Up the Band" in the finale of the first act.

In 1930, the sisters had a specialty in the film King of Jazz. They performed the song "A Bench in the Park", with Joe Venuti and Eddie Lang, and with The Rhythm Boys (Bing Crosby, Harry Barris, and Al Rinker). That same year they also appeared in the film Spring Is Here in which they sang "Crying for the Carolines".

They performed "Falling in Love Again" in a Paramount Hollywood on Parade short in 1932.

== Radio and recordings ==
The sisters also made radio broadcasts in the 1920s. They recorded a series of phonograph records for Brunswick Records and Victor Records, as well as appearing on sides for Columbia. Their final appearance on network radio was on an all-star tribute to Irving Berlin in 1938.

== Personal lives ==
Bobbe Brox married film producer William Perlberg in 1928; she married songwriter James Van Heusen in 1966. Lorayne married orchestra leader Henry Busse in 1935.
