= Dawn song =

A dawn song is a song about lovers separating at dawn. The same genre is found under different names in several medieval languages:

- Alba (Occitan)
- Aubade (French)
- Tagelied (German)

== See also ==
- Dawn Song, a professor at the University of California, Berkeley
- Dawnsong, a public artwork in Indianapolis
- Song of the Dawn, a 1930 song
- Dawn chorus (birds), morning birdsong
