= Loyce Whiteman =

American popular singer (1913–1989)

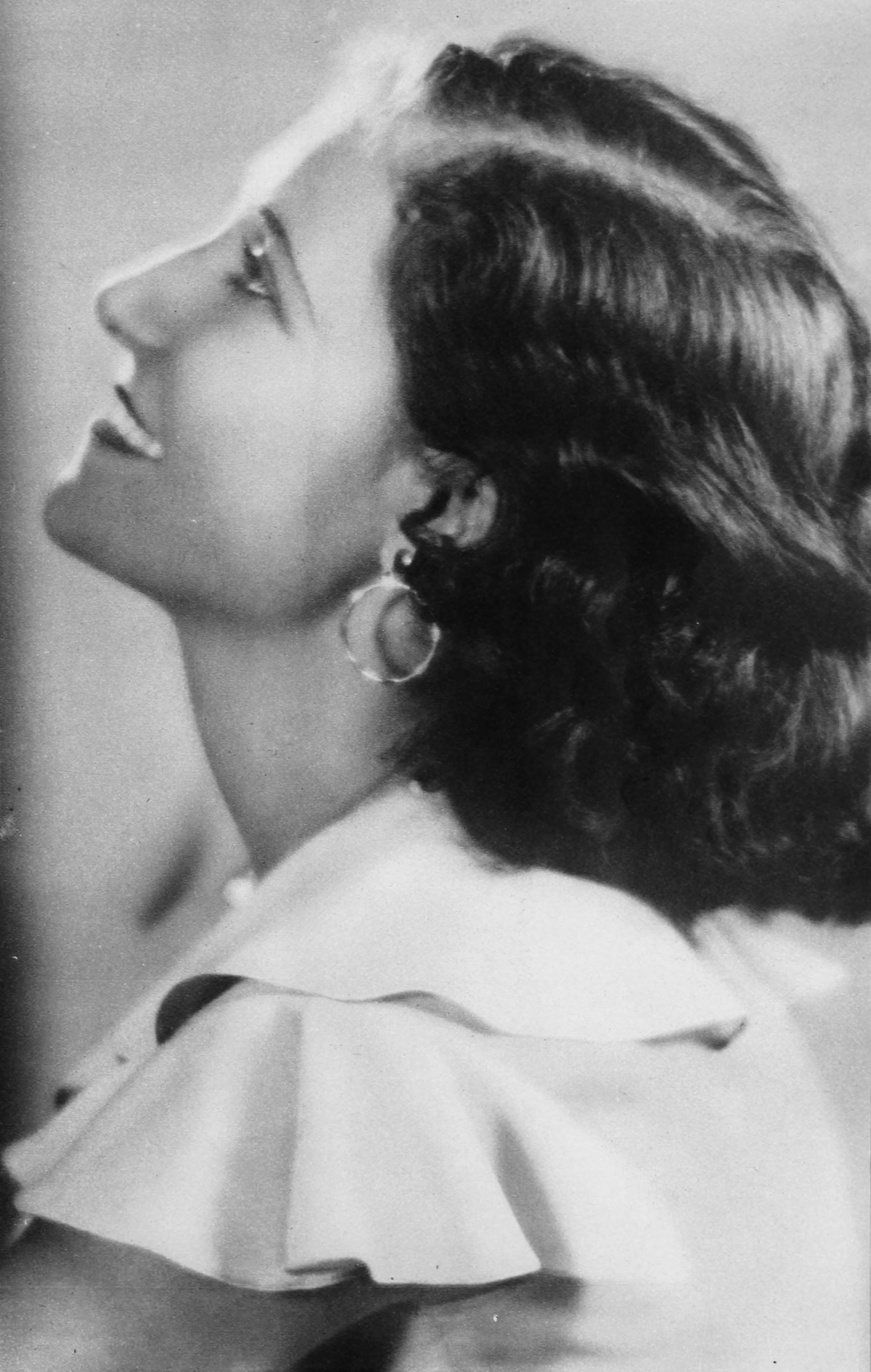
- 1931

Background information
- Born: 1913
- Died: July 3, 1989 (aged 76)
- Occupation: Vocalist
- Formerly of: Gus Arnheim & His Orchestra

Loyce Whiteman (1913–1989), also known as Lois Whiteman, was an American popular singer.

== Biography ==
Born in Dallas, Texas, and raised in Glendale, California, where she attended Glendale High School. She got her start in a singing contest and was engaged as a vocalist with radio station KTM. Moving on to station KFWB, it was there that she was asked to audition for Gus Arnheim & His Cocoanut Grove Orchestra in 1931 at the age of 18.

The audition was successful. The book Bing Crosby: The Hollow Man describes Loyce's opening night at the Cocoanut Grove on Easter Sunday night, April 5, 1931. She had been very nervous at her audition, but this was nothing compared to her opening-night jitters. Bing Crosby, then one of The Rhythm Boys, was beside her as it came time for her to go on, and she nervously commented to him that she did not know what to do with her hands. "Bing did a sweet thing that night," Loyce said. "He said, 'Don't worry about it. I'll hold your hand,' and he accompanied me to the mike, held my hand, and sang half a chorus with me to get me started. I'll never forget that." On May 1, 1931, Loyce made a record with Crosby and the Gus Arnheim Orchestra called "Ho Hum!"

While singing with the Orchestra, she met Harry Barris. They were married in 1931. They appear together in an episode of Rambling 'Round Radio Row, where she sings his composition, "It Was So Beautiful." They had a daughter, Marti Barris, who was born on April 6, 1937, in Hollywood, California and who became a singer as well. They divorced in 1946. Loyce later married Ken Hubbard, captain on the Santa Barbara police force.

Together with Marti, Marti Music, a music publishing company, was formed. They wrote songs together, including "Coffee Date," recorded by Ella Mae Morse, and "Scottish Fling", to which Marti provided a melody and Loyce provided lyrics.
