= The Muppet Show: Music, Mayhem, and More =

2002 The Muppets compilation album

Compilation album by The Muppets
- Released: September 17, 2002
- Genres: Comedy music, variety
- Labels: Jim Henson Home Entertainment, Rhino

The Muppets chronology
Muppets from Space: Original Motion Picture Score (1999)	The Muppet Show: Music, Mayhem, and More (2002)	Best of the Muppets featuring The Muppets' Wizard of Oz (2005)

The Muppet Show: Music, Mayhem, and More is a Muppets soundtrack/compilation album released in 2002 by Rhino and Jim Henson Home Entertainment. Its release commemorates the 25th anniversary of The Muppet Show. Although the disc is considered a Muppet Show and Muppets soundtrack collection, it includes two tracks that originated on Sesame Street ("Mahna Mahna" and "Bein' Green").

This was the last Muppet album produced before The Walt Disney Company's acquisition of the Muppets in 2004; since then Muppet albums have been released by Walt Disney Records.

== Reception ==
AllMusic found that the mix of Muppet Show and Muppet movie music to be off-putting, saying, "Many listeners may find that the paltry amount of material from The Muppet Show merely whets their appetite for more. The soundtracks (apart from The Muppet Movie) don't pack the same combination of energy, laughs, and pathos that the TV show did; they try too hard to be statements or big emotional moments and lack the effortless grace of The Muppet Show."

== Track listing ==
Track Listing
No.	Title	Writer(s)	Artist(s)	Length
1.	"The Muppet Show Theme"	Sam Pottle, Jim Henson	The Muppets	0:55
2.	"Mahna Mahna/Lullaby of Birdland"	Piero Umiliani, George Shearing, George David Weiss	Mahna Mahna and the Snowths	2:17
3.	"There's a New Sound"	Tony Burello	Scooter	4:29
4.	"The Amazing Marvin Suggs and His Muppaphone Play 'Lady Of Spain'"	Stanley Damerell, Tolchard Evans, Robert Hargreaves, Henry Tilsley	Marvin Suggs	1:38
5.	"Trees"	Joyce Kilmer, Oscar Rabach	Sam the Eagle, Wayne and Wanda	0:40
6.	"A Monologue by Fozzie Bear"	Dialogue: Jerry Juhl, Jim Henson, Frank Oz	Fozzie Bear and Kermit the Frog	1:51
7.	"Bein' Green"	Joe Raposo	Kermit	2:13
8.	"Simon Smith and His Amazing Dancing Bear"	Randy Newman	Scooter and Fozzie Bear	1:57
9.	"Tenderly"	Walter Gross, Jack Lawrence	Dr. Teeth and the Electric Mayhem	2:00
10.	"Wishing Song"	Paul Tracey	Gonzo the Great	2:28
11.	"What Now My Love?"	Gilbert Bécaud, Pierre Delanoë	Miss Piggy	2:17
12.	"Happy Feet"	Milton Ager, Jack Yellen	Kermit and Frog Chorus	1:38
13.	"We Got Us"	Walter Marks	The Muppets	1:24
14.	"Closing Theme (Instrumental)"	Pottle, Henson	Dr. Teeth and the Electric Mayhem	0:57
15.	"Rainbow Connection"	Paul Williams, Kenneth Ascher	Kermit	3:16
16.	"Movin' Right Along"	Williams, Ascher	Kermit and Fozzie	2:57
17.	"Can You Picture That?"	Williams, Ascher	Dr. Teeth and the Electric Mayhem	2:31
18.	"Finale: The Magic Store"	Williams, Ascher	The Muppets	5:19
19.	"Hey A Movie!"	Raposo	Kermit	2:41
20.	"Happiness Hotel"	Raposo	The Muppets	3:05
21.	"The First Time It Happens"	Raposo	Miss Piggy and Kermit	4:12
22.	"Together Again"	Jeff Moss	Kermit, Miss Piggy, Fozzie and The Muppets	2:53
23.	"I'm Gonna Always Love You"	Moss	Miss Piggy, Kermit, Fozzie, Rowlf the Dog, Scooter, Gonzo	2:57
24.	"He'll Make Me Happy"	Moss	Kermit, Miss Piggy, and the Muppets	2:05
25.	"One More Sleep 'Til Christmas"	Williams	Kermit	2:49
26.	"Love Led Us Here"	Barry Mann, Cynthia Weil	Kermit and Miss Piggy	2:22
27.	"I'm Going to Go Back There Someday"	Williams, Ascher	Gonzo	3:29
