= He's a Honey =

1932 film

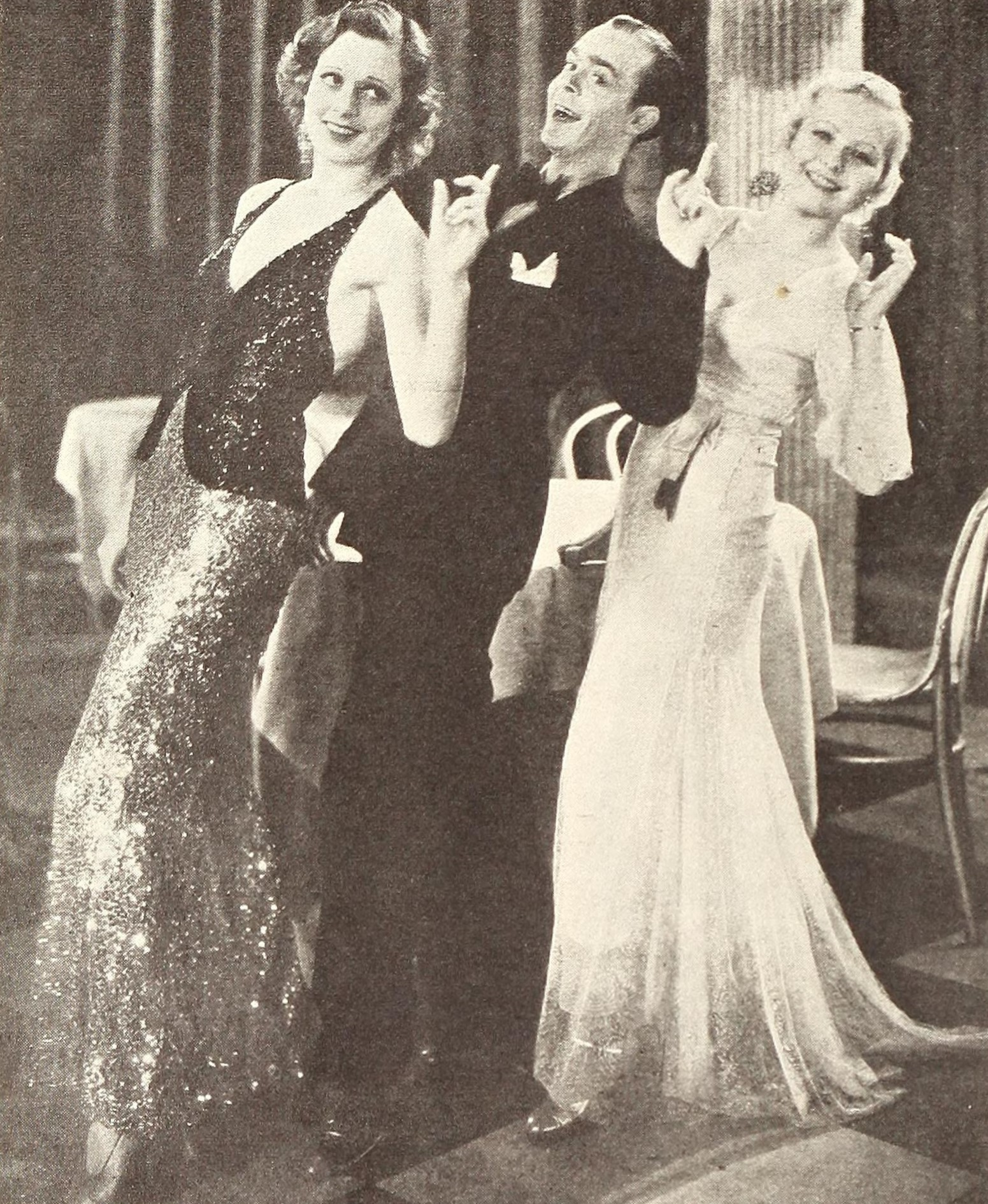
- Eleanor Hunt, Harry Barris, and Helen Mann in a scene from the film
- Directed by: Walter Graham
- Written by: The Scribblers
- Starring: Harry Barris
- Cinematography: Eddie Snyder
- Distributed by: Educational Pictures
- Release date: April 17, 1932
- Running time: 2 reels
- Country: United States
- Language: English

He's a Honey is a 1932 short musical comedy film directed by Walter Graham. It stars Harry Barris and features Helen Mann, Eleanor Hunt, and Edgar Kennedy. Its working title was Wedding Night.

== Plot ==
Harry Barris plays a sought-after bandleader who wants to marry Helen Mann's character. Her father, played by Edgar Kennedy, disapproves. Nevertheless, she is won in the end.

== Cast ==
- Harry Barris as a bandleader
- Helen Mann as his love interest
- Edgar Kennedy as her father
- Eleanor Hunt as a girl
- Bobby Vernon as a heavy
- Eddie Baker
- George Waggner

== Reception ==
"This is for ardent Harry Barris fans only," a critic wrote for Photoplay. It was written in Motion Picture Herald that Harry Barris was "a far better musician than comedian." However, the critic strongly praised Edgar Kennedy's performance. Screenland described it as a "peppy song-and-dance comedy, with Harry making a personal hit in it." Bobby Vernon's role as a heavy was a change of pace compared to his earlier roles. "He gained a howl when he said 'Scram' in a deep basso voice—it came as such a surprise in a tense moment," wrote a critic for Hollywood Filmograph.
