= Irene Taylor =

American singer (1906–1988)

Irene Taylor (1906–1988) was an American singer best known for her recorded work with Paul Whiteman. She was married to singer and bandleader Seger Ellis.

== Career ==
Taylor came from Muskogee, Oklahoma, but seems to have begun her musical career in Dallas. There she made her recording debut for Okeh Records in 1925, resulting in two sides where she is accompanied by local bandleader Jack Gardner. After that Taylor worked for a while with another local band, the Louisiana Ramblers, before going to New York City.

In New York in 1928 Taylor made what is probably her best known and most frequently reissued recording: Mississippi Mud (Victor 21274) with Paul Whiteman's orchestra, also featuring Bix Beiderbecke and The Rhythm Boys (including a young Bing Crosby). This was the first Whiteman recording ever to feature a female vocalist. Taylor would work briefly with Whiteman again during the early 1930s, replacing Mildred Bailey who had left the band due to disagreements regarding her salary. During this latter period, Taylor's recordings with Whiteman included Willow Weep for Me (Victor 24187). This was the second recording ever of this future jazz standard by Ann Ronell and became a hit. She was also the vocalist on one of Whiteman's hottest 1930's recordings, "In The Dim Dim Dawning" (Victor 24189). Both songs were re-recorded 8 days later and were included in the rare 33 1/3 long play transcription (L-16017) along with "Take Me In Your Arms", sung by Jack Fulton.

Otherwise Taylor worked mostly in radio during the 1930s, including regular appearances in Bing Crosby's radio shows, and seems to have had her main base in Chicago. In November 1931, she was a singer on WEAF in New York City. She also made a few records in her own name, first for Victor Records (which were never issued) and later for Vocalion Records. She also appeared on Broadway and in the Vitaphone short film Listening In where she sang I Ain't Lazy, I'm Just Dreamin'.

Taylor performed in vaudeville.

== Personal life ==
Probably in the 1930s, Taylor married pianist, crooner, and bandleader Seger Ellis. She appeared as a vocalist on several of her husband's big band recordings during the late 1930s and early 1940s. In a 1965 interview with the Dallas Times-Herald, Taylor reflected: "I was on top of the world when it suddenly ended in 1944. It was a hard adjustment. Not only was my career gone, but I couldn't even speak for a year without sounding like I had laryngitis. I burned all of my scrapbooks, records and everything else that was a link with the past. I'm afraid I was very bitter." After World War II, Taylor married Texas businessman Bill Gillett, and the couple settled in Dallas, Texas. Irene Gillett (née Taylor) died on June 24, 1988.

== Solo discography ==
Recording location and date	Title	Author	Issue	Comments
Dallas, c. October 18, 1925	I Did Wanta, But I Don't Wanta Now	Gardner	Okeh 40527	Accompanied by Jack Gardner's Orchestra
Dallas, c. October 18, 1925	I Ain't Thinkin' 'Bout You	Gardner	Okeh 40527	Accompanied by Jack Gardner's Orchestra
Chicago, July 20, 1928	My Castle In The Clouds	–	Victor (unissued)	Accompanied by unknown quintet
Chicago, July 20, 1928	I Must Have That Man	–	Victor (unissued)	Accompanied by unknown quintet
New York City, July 12, 1933	Shadows On The Swanee	Young-Burke-Spina	Vocalion 25003	Dorsey Brothers Orchestra
New York City, July 12, 1933	Don't Blame Me	–	Vocalion 25003	Dorsey Brothers Orchestra

== Sources ==
- Irene Taylor Website, complete discography
- Thomas A. DeLong: Pops - Paul Whiteman, King of Jazz (Piscataway 1983)
- Gary Giddens: Bing Crosby - A Pocketful of Dreams: The early years 1903-1940 (Boston, New York & London 2002)
- Dick Raichelson: Liner notes for the CD Dallas Rhythm (Jazz Oracle BDW 8021)
- Brian Rust: The American Dance Band Discography 1917-1942 (New Rochelle, New York 1975)
- Brian Rust: Jazz Records 1897-1942 (5th edition, Chigwell, Essex 1983)
- Abrams, Steven and Settlemier, Tyrone: Taylor's recordings for Vocalion listed at The Online Discographical Project
- Irene Taylor featured at The Virtual Victrola (with photos and sound files)
- Facts about Willow Weep For Me at jazzstandards.com
- List of Vitaphone shorts (including Listening In) at The Vitaphone Project
