= God's Gift to Women =

1931 film

- Directed by: Michael Curtiz
- Written by: Raymond Griffith; Frederick H. Brennan; Joseph Jackson
- Based on: The Devil Was Sick by Jane Hinton
- Starring: Frank Fay; Laura La Plante; Joan Blondell
- Cinematography: Robert Kurrle
- Edited by: James Gibbon
- Music by: David Mendoza
- Distributed by: Warner Bros. Pictures
- Release date: April 13, 1931
- Running time: 72 minutes
- Country: United States
- Language: English
- Budget: $222,000
- Box office: $168,000

God's Gift to Women is a 1931 American pre-Code romantic musical comedy film directed by Michael Curtiz, starring Frank Fay, Laura La Plante, and Joan Blondell. The film, based on the play The Devil Was Sick by Jane Hinton, was originally completed as a musical film; however, because of audience dislike for musicals at that time, all the songs were cut in American prints. The full film was released intact in other countries, where there was no such decline in popularity.

== Plot ==
Wealthy French playboy Toto Duryea is irresistible to women, but is in love with none of them. According to Monsieur Rancour, to Toto "every woman is like a new dish to be tasted." When he is finally and instantly smitten with American Diane Churchill, he has great difficulty proving to her and her father that he truly loves her. Finally, he convinces her that he is sincere; Mr. Churchill insists that Toto give up his women and carousing and stay away from his daughter for six months to prove he has reformed. He also asks that Toto get examined by Churchill's doctor.

Dr. Dumont has bad news for Toto: his heart is so weak, even the excitement caused by so much as a woman's kiss would be fatal. Toto takes to his bed, but three of his girlfriends insist on nursing him: Fifi, Florine and Dagmar. When they all converge on his bedroom and discover each other, they engage in a three-way catfight. Then an outraged husband shows up to shoot him. Dr. Dumont arrives and divulges Toto's condition. The husband and the three women all depart. Then Diane shows up, but before she leaves with her father for America, she insists on spending an hour of passion with him. Unable to resist, he kisses her. When he remains alive, he upbraids the newly arrived Dr. Dumont for his faulty prognosis. Mr. Churchill explains that he had Dumont fake his diagnosis, that it was all a test of Toto's claim he loved Diane "more than life itself". Convinced, he gives Toto permission to marry Diane.

== Cast ==
- Frank Fay as Toto Duryea
- Laura La Plante as Diane Churchill
- Joan Blondell as Fifi
- Charles Winninger as John Churchill
- Alan Mowbray as Auguste, Toto's butler
- Arthur Edmund Carewe as Dr. Louis Dumont
- Billy House as Monsieur Cesare, a friend of Toto's
- Yola d'Avril as Dagmar
- Louise Brooks as Florine
- Margaret Livingston as Tania Donaliff
- Armand Kaliz as Monsieur Rancour
- Charles Judels as Undertaker
- Tyrell Davis as Basil (billed as Tyrrell Davis)
- Eleanor Gutchrlein as Maybelle (as Sisters G)
- Karla Gutchrlein as Marie (as Sisters G)

== Cuts and surviving print ==
The following numbers were cut from the film version released in the United States, where musicals had temporarily lost their popularity:

- An elaborate dance number by the Sisters "G" (Eleanor and Karla Gutchrlein) originally appeared in the film during the nightclub sequence at the beginning of the film. Although the Sisters "G" appear in the credits, they are only seen for a couple of minutes in the shortened American version.
- Frank Fay sang the theme song, which is heard over the credits and is underscored several times in the film.

The complete film was released intact in countries outside the United States, but only the American print is known to have survived with a print preserved by the Library of Congress.

Warner Archive Collection released the film on DVD on December 11, 2012.

== Box office ==
According to records at Warner Bros., the film earned $150,000 domestically and $18,000 foreign.
