= Seger Ellis =

American jazz pianist and vocalist (1904–1995)

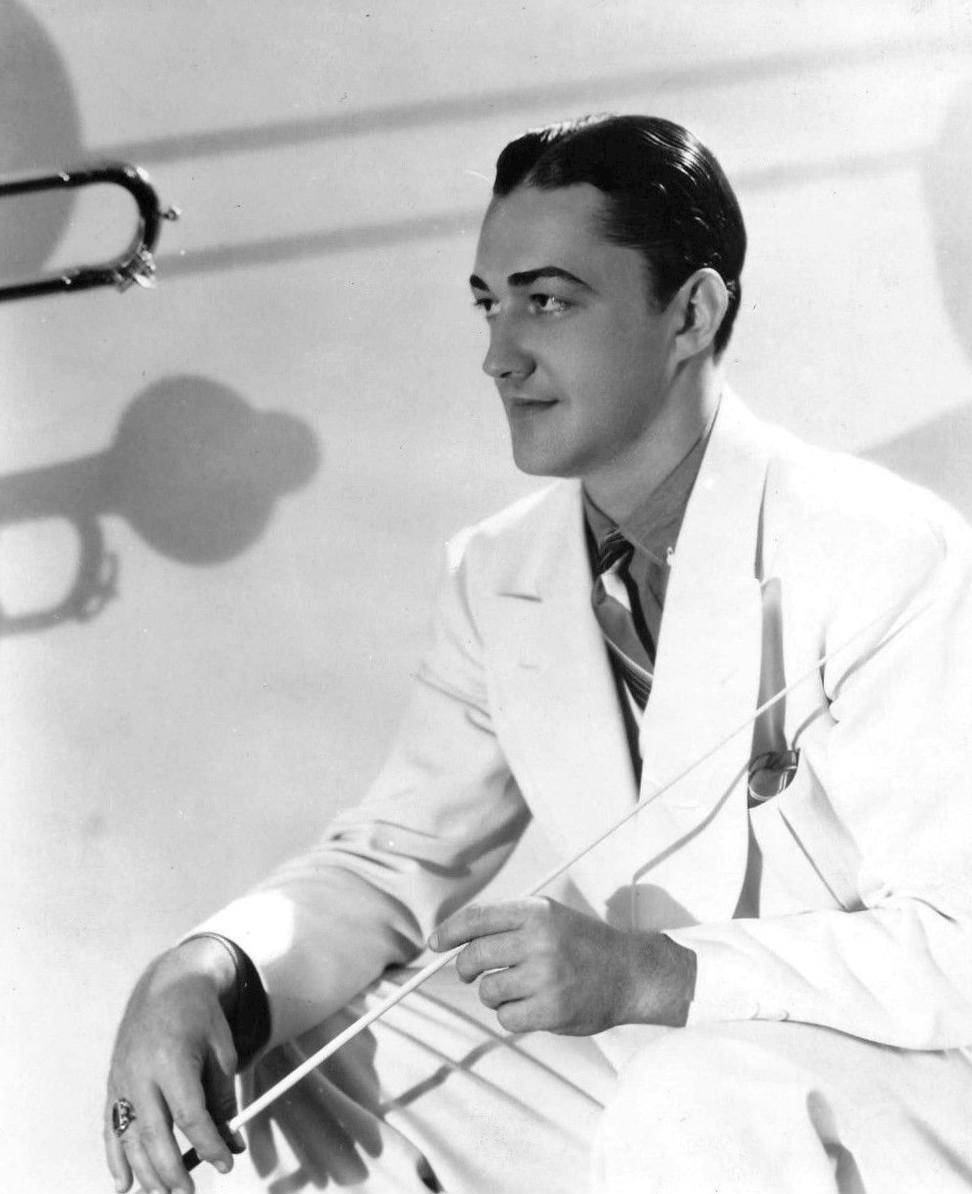
- Ellis in 1938

Background information
- Born: Seger Pillot Ellis; July 4, 1904; Houston, Texas, United States
- Died: September 29, 1995 (aged 91) Houston, Texas, United States
- Genres: Jazz, popular song
- Instruments: Voice, piano

Seger Pillot Ellis (July 4, 1904 – September 29, 1995) was an American jazz pianist and vocalist. He also made a few brief film appearances, most notably in collaboration with director Ida Lupino.

== Life and career ==
He was born in Houston, Texas, United States. Ellis began his career as pianist playing live for a local Houston radio station (later known as KPRC) in the early 1920s. In 1925, he was added to the orchestra of Lloyd Finlay for a "field trip" recording session for Victor Records, and was also allowed to cut two piano solos. Although unissued for technical reasons, these solo efforts led to Ellis being invited to Victor's regular recording studio in Camden, New Jersey, to cut a number of piano solos, all or most of them compositions of his own. These were among the earliest records Victor made using the new electric microphone and recording equipment; a technique that was yet not perfected, which probably explains why only four of the titles were eventually issued. Of these the coupling "Prairie Blues" and "Sentimental Blues" became a minor hit.

After his first recording experiences, Ellis returned to Houston and radio work as well as playing in vaudeville theaters. During this period Ellis, mainly on request of his employers at the radio station, began adding singing to his piano playing. His pleasant voice went well with the audiences and, in 1927, he was invited to New York City to make vocal test recordings. His first issued vocal record was "Sunday" on the Columbia label. This was followed by a string of records for Okeh Records, where Ellis was usually backed by small studio groups, that he was allowed to pick himself. Ellis used the opportunity to select many of the best jazz musicians of the time, including Tommy and Jimmy Dorsey, Joe Venuti, Eddie Lang, Andy Sannella and - on two occasions - Louis Armstrong. On these records, Ellis sang in a bittersweet alto, with which he was uncomfortable early in his career, believing his voice to be too high. Ellis was popular enough during the time he was on OKeh for them to create a special silver colored custom label for his records.

Ellis's first recording career ended in 1931. In the late 1930s however, he returned with a big band of his own, known as his "Choirs of Brass Orchestra" with himself conducting and taking occasional vocals. The band also featured his wife, Irene Taylor, as a vocalist. Later in his career, Ellis focused more on song writing, although he continued to record sporadically as well as playing the piano.

In 1939, Ellis reorganized and his new band featured the conventional four-man reed section. He disbanded in 1941, and was enlisted in the United States Army Air Forces in 1942.

After moving back to Texas, he began to be less active as a performer and more involved in songwriting. Among his many compositions were "My Beloved Is Rugged" and "11:60PM" (both recorded by Harry James), "Gene's Boogie" (recorded by Gene Krupa), and "Little Jack Frost, Get Lost" and "You're All I Want for Christmas" (both recorded by Bing Crosby). "December" was recorded by Count Basie with a Mills Brothers vocal. The Seger Ellis songwriting catalog also includes "No Baby, Nobody But You" and "You Be You But Let Me Be Me".

Seger Ellis gradually retired and took up residence in Houston, where he died in a retirement home, on September 29, 1995.

== Popular recordings ==
- "Freight Yard Blues"
- "Prairie Blues"
- "Sentimental Blues"
- "No Baby, Nobody But You"
- "Sweet Sue, Just You"
- "You Be You But Let Me Be Me"
- "Ain't Misbehavin'" featuring Louis Armstrong
- "Cheerful Little Earful" (December 1930)
- "The Shivery Stomp"
- "Heartaches" (rendition has notoriety in being sampled by The Caretaker)

== Popular compositions ==
- "Prairie Blues"
- "Sentimental Blues"
- "The Shivery Stomp"
- "My Beloved Is Rugged" featuring Harry James
- "11:60PM" featuring Harry James
- "Gene's Boogie" featuring Gene Krupa
- "Little Jack Frost, Get Lost" featuring Bing Crosby
- "You're All I Want for Christmas" featuring Bing Crosby
- "December" featuring The Mills Brothers and Count Basie
- "What You Don't Know Won't Hurt You"
- "No Baby, Nobody But You" June Christy and Stan Kenton
- "You Be You But Let Me Be Me"
- "You Don't Have to be a Santa Claus"

== Sources ==
- Lawrence Brown: liner notes for the CD Prairie Blues - The Music of Seger Ellis (Azure AZ-CD-22)
- Allan Dodge: liner notes for the CD Seger Ellis: Jazz in a Sentimental Mood (The Old Masters MB 131)
- Brian Rust: Jazz Records 1897-1942 (Fifth edition, Chigwell, Essex, 1983)
