= That Rascal =

1932 film

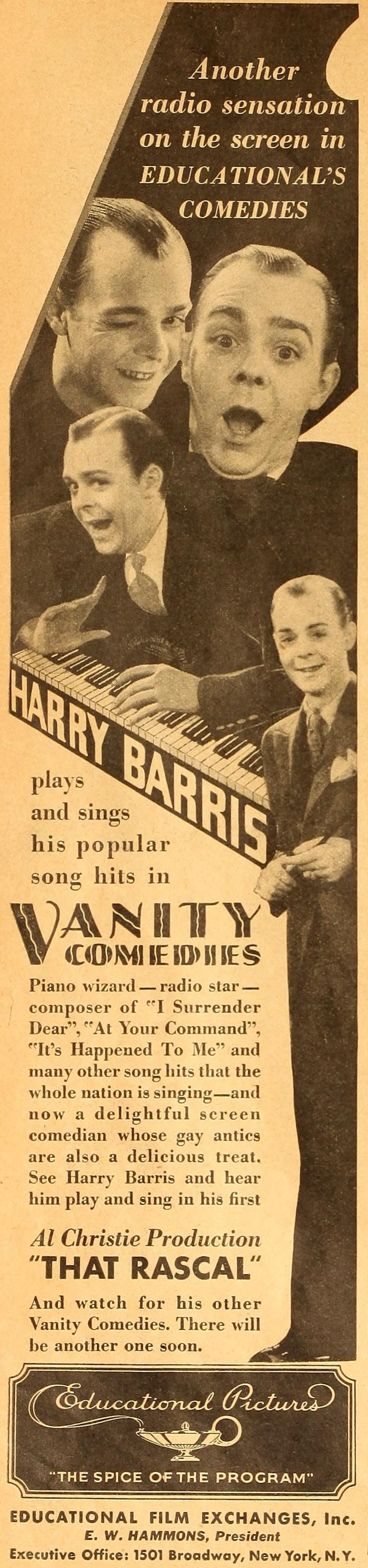
- Directed by: Al Christie
- Written by: Frank Roland Conklin; Bobby Vernon
- Starring: Harry Barris
- Distributed by: Educational Pictures
- Release date: February 21, 1932
- Running time: 2 reels
- Country: United States
- Language: English

That Rascal is a 1932 short musical comedy film directed by Al Christie and starring Harry Barris with Audrey Ferris as his leading lady. "Having made Bing Crosby familiar to you as a personality, besides a voice, Educational is now doing the same thing for Harry Barris, who's coming up like a skyrocket as a radio entertainer," a writer for Motion Picture Magazine claimed.

== Plot ==
A plot summary from Motion Picture Magazine reads:

Harry is shown in his real-life role of entertainer at the Cocoanut Grove in the Ambassador Hotel in Los Angeles, from which point the story takes off. He happens to be the favorite radio singer of his prospective father-in-law, who hates another crooner who sings, "You Rascal, You." When a jealous rival persuades Harry to sing the number, he and the girl have to elope.
