= Jeanie Lang =

American singer and actress

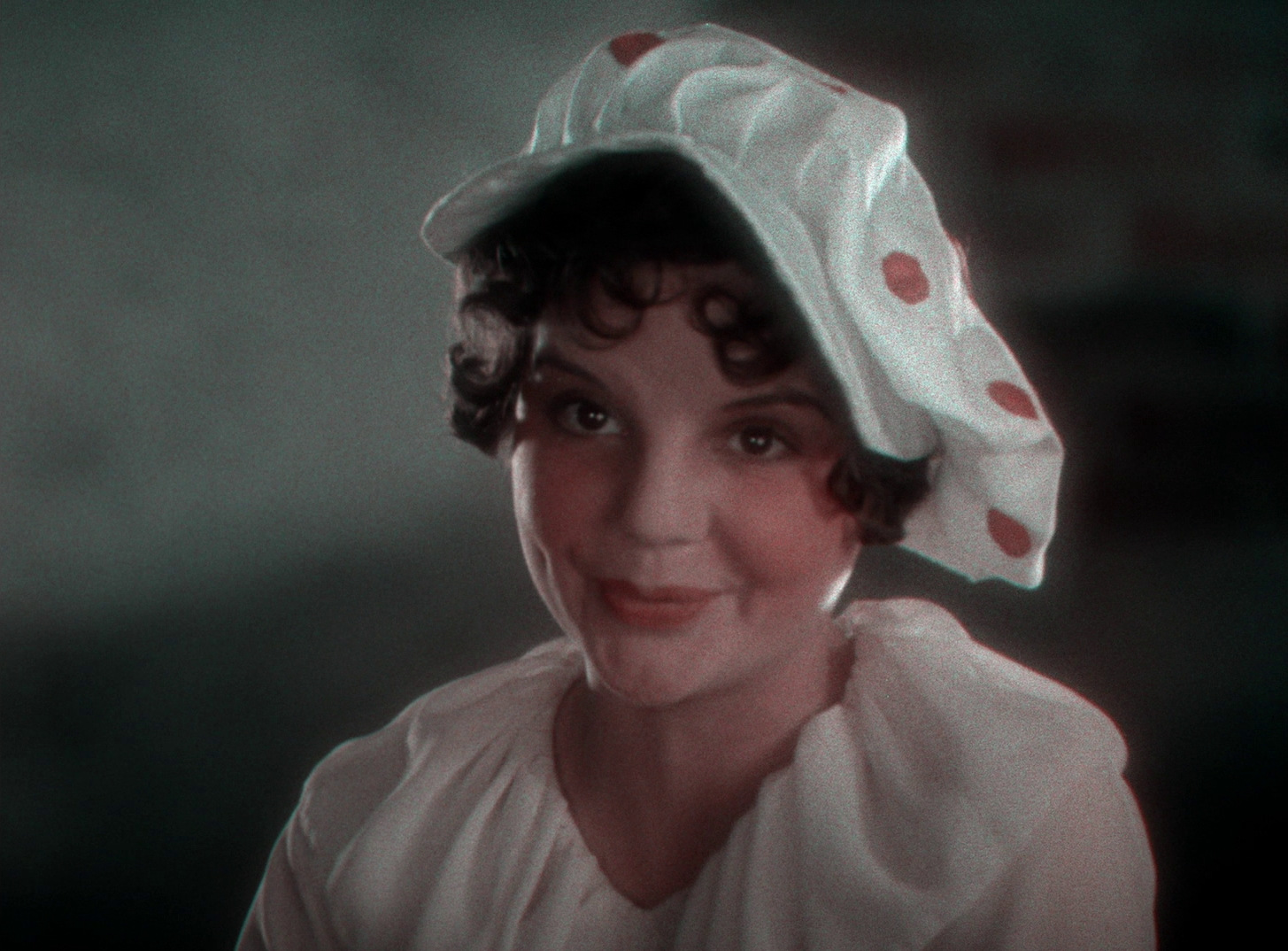
Lang in King of Jazz (1930)

Jeanie Lang (born Mary Eugenia Wirick) was an American actress, mostly known for having a lead role in the 1930 color film King of Jazz.

Lang was born Genie Wyrick on December 17, 1911, in St. Louis. She had three older brothers. She attended Maplewood High School in St Louis.

Lang's initial acting experience came on stage in St. Louis. After about a year of that, she and her family moved to Hollywood, where she was signed to be in King of Jazz (1930). On a trip to California, Lang and her family toured the Universal studios. An encounter with Paul Whiteman there while he was making the film King of Jazz led to her having a screen test and a microphone test. As a result of the tests, Lang sang two songs in the film. She sang with Whiteman and his orchestra (Ragamuffin Romeo, I Like to Do Things for You) and in the shorts Freshman Love (1931) and The Way of All Freshmen (1933). In December 1932, Lang was the featured female singer when Stoopnagle and Budd returned to radio with a "new comedy revue series" on CBS. In 1933, she performed alongside Tom Howard and occasionally the vocal harmonizers known as the Three X Sisters on NBC Radio’s Musical Grocery Store program. A newly resurfaced radio transcribed song, "Rumble Seat" of her vocals.

Radio programs on which Lang performed included Musical Grocery Store and broadcasts of Jack Denny's orchestra. When the Denny program began in September 1933, one newspaper described Lang as the "self-styled leader of the 'squeak' school of singing" and said that she "continues to delight and dumbfound the listeners with her extraordinary vocal style".

She sang on stage as part of the program at the Brooklyn Paramount theater in 1933 and with Buddy Rogers at the Chicago Theatre in 1934.

She was married to Arthur C. Langkamer (Lang), who died in 1986. She died on September 19, 1993, in Broward, Florida.
