= Marti Barris =

American actress and popular singer (1937–1995)

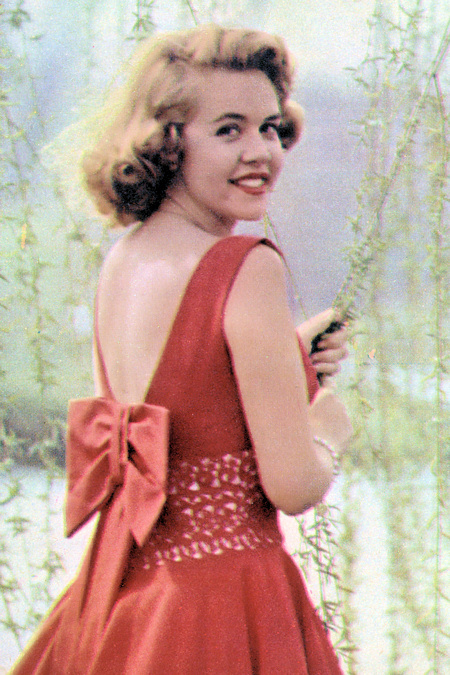
- 1960

Background information
- Born: Frances Maurine Barris; April 6, 1937; Hollywood, California, U.S.
- Died: December 13, 1995 (aged 58) Los Angeles, California, U.S.
- Occupations: Actress, vocalist

Marti Barris (April 6, 1937 – December 13, 1995) was an American actress and popular singer. She recorded for Keen Records during the late 1950s and early 1960s, but never had a big hit. She was the daughter of Harry Barris and Loyce Whiteman, both musicians.

Baris graduated from Burbank High School. When she was 19, she signed with Verve Records. She was the first female vocalist to sing with Freddy Martin's orchestra. In 1960, she began playing Peppi Mint on the Howdy Doody television program.

== Discography ==
- "Can't You Read Between the Lines"/"Ahbe Casabe"-Keen 4018
- "You're My Thrill"/"Sweet Talk"-Keen 1959
