= Brose Partington =

Indianapolis-based kinetic sculptor (born 1979)

- Born: 1979 (age 46–47); Indianapolis
- Education: Herron School of Art & Design
- Known for: Kinetic Sculpture
- Notable work: Harvesting Knowledge, Entangled, The Tide
- Awards: Efroymson Fellowship, Indy Arts Council
- Website: http://www.brosepartington.com/

Brose Partington is an Indianapolis-based kinetic sculptor. He graduated from Cathedral High School in 1998 and earned his Bachelor of Fine Arts from the Herron School of Art & Design in 2004. His artworks have been shown in numerous cities across the United States including New York, Chicago, Miami, Indianapolis, and Los Angeles; in European galleries, and the Hermitage Museum in St. Petersburg, Russia.

== Work ==
Partington's work is inspired by "movements around us and the patterns those movements create." In Indianapolis, Partington's sculptures have been exhibited at the Harrison Center for the Arts, Primary Colours, and Flux Space in group exhibitions. He has permanent installations at the Indianapolis Art Center ARTSPARK (Dawnsong) and Herron School of Art and Design on the IUPUI campus (Entangled).

His work has been featured in solo exhibitions, including; Urban Manipulations at Flux Space in 2006; Systematic Sales at Dam Stuhltrager Gallery in 2008; and Trophy, in collaboration with James Darr, at the Erstwhile Gallery in 2008.

Partington's installation art was featured in the 2006 ScopeMiami; the 2007 ARTropolis Bridge Art Fair, Chicago; the 2007 Coachella Valley Music and Arts Festival, Indio, California; and the Scope Art Show in Lincoln Center, New York in 2007. The artist has enjoyed international art fair exposure at the Contemporary Istanbul in 2007; Scope Basel, Switzerland; and the Shanghai International Gallery Exhibition of Media Art, eArts Beyond, in 2009. In 2008 Partington's work was featured at The State Hermitage Museum, St. Petersburg, Russia exhibition Cyberfest.

iMOCA, the Indianapolis Museum of Contemporary Art, featured Partington's installation art in December 2009. He was commissioned to create an artwork, "Harvesting Knowledge," for The Public Collection, a project in Indianapolis.

Partington has been mentioned in notable cultural blogs and featured on National Public Radio's The Art of the Matter and in Nuvo Newsweekly. In 2007 he was awarded a $20,000 Efroymson Contemporary Art Fellowship from the Efroymson Family Fund.

Brose Partington is represented by Dam, Stuhltrager Gallery in Brooklyn, New York and in Berlin, Germany.

== See also ==
- Rube Goldberg
- George Rickey
