= King of Jazz =

1930 American pre-Code musical color film

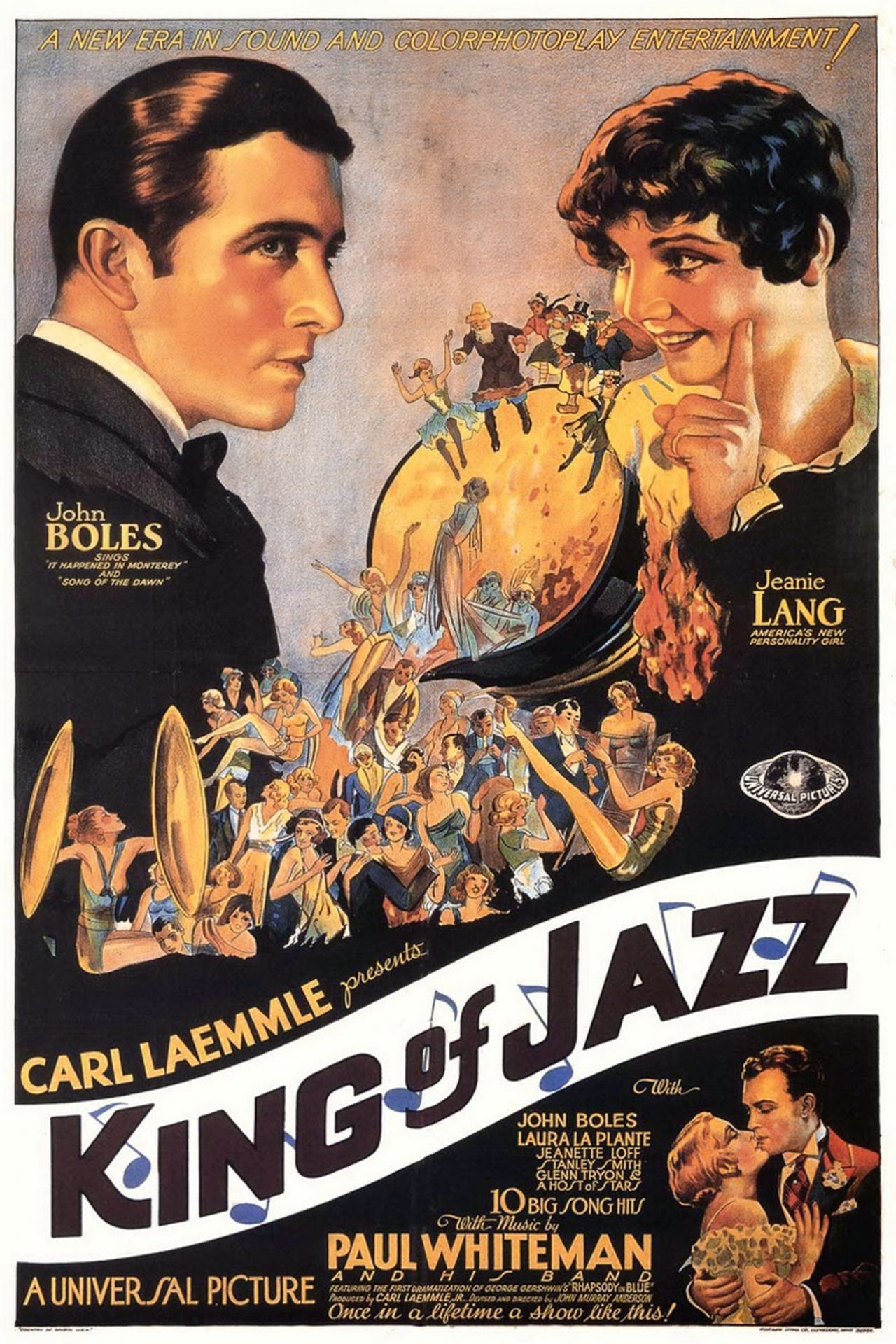
- Theatrical release poster
- Directed by: John Murray Anderson
- Written by: Charles MacArthur; Harry Ruskin
- Produced by: Carl Laemmle Jr.
- Starring: Paul Whiteman; John Boles; Laura La Plante; Jeanie Lang; Jeanette Loff; Bing Crosby; Al Rinker; Harry Barris; William T. Kent; Eleanor and Karla Gutöhrlein
- Cinematography: Jerome Ash; Hal Mohr; Ray Rennahan (Technicolor)
- Edited by: Robert Carlisle
- Music by: James Dietrich; Billy Rose; Milton Ager; George Gershwin; Mabel Wayne; Jack Yellen; Ferde Grofé
- Color process: Two-color Technicolor
- Production company: Universal Pictures
- Distributed by: Universal Pictures
- Release date: April 19, 1930
- Running time: 105 minutes
- Country: United States
- Language: English (synchronized sound)
- Budget: $2,000,000 (estimated)

King of Jazz is a 1930 American pre-Code color musical film starring Paul Whiteman and his orchestra. In the 1920s Whiteman signed and featured jazz musicians including Joe Venuti and Eddie Lang (both are seen and heard in the film), Bix Beiderbecke (who had left before filming began), Frank Trumbauer, and others.

King of Jazz was filmed in the early two-color Technicolor process and was produced by Carl Laemmle Jr. for Universal Pictures. The film featured several songs sung on camera by the Rhythm Boys (Bing Crosby, Al Rinker and Harry Barris), as well as off-camera solo vocals by Crosby during the opening credits and, very briefly, during a cartoon sequence. King of Jazz still survives in a near-complete color print and is not a lost film, unlike many contemporary musicals that now exist only either in incomplete form or as black-and-white reduction copies.

In 2013, the film was selected for preservation in the United States National Film Registry by the Library of Congress as being "culturally, historically, or aesthetically significant".

As a published work from 1930 with a valid copyright renewal, the film entered the American public domain on January 1, 2026. (Note: Under R211370)

== Plot ==
The full film.

King of Jazz is a revue. There is no story continuity, only a series of musical numbers alternating with "blackouts" (brief comedy sketches with abrupt punch line endings) and other short introductory or linking segments.

The musical numbers are diverse in style, adopting a 'something for everyone' approach to appeal to family audiences. They cater to the young, the old, and the middle-aged, each in turn. The slow "Bridal Veil" number, featuring (according to Universal) the largest veil ever made, exhibits Victorian sentimentality that might best appeal to the elderly. The middle-aged were courted with a tune by John Boles in a lush setting crooning. "It Happened in Monterey" in waltz time, or in a barn with a chorus of red-shirted ranch hands belting out the "Song of the Dawn". The "jazzy" "Happy Feet" number was composed to appeal to younger viewers.

One segment early in the film serves to introduce several of the band's virtuoso musicians (who are not credited by name). Another provides the audience with a chance to see the Rhythm Boys, already famous by sound through their recordings and radio broadcasts, but not sight. There are novelty and comedy numbers ranging from the mildly risqué ("Ragamuffin Romeo", which features contortionistic dancing by Marion Stadler and Don Rose) to the humorously sadomasochistic (the second chorus of "I Like to Do Things for You") to the simply silly ("I'm a Fisherman"). There is a line of chorus girls, practically mandatory in early musicals, but in their featured spot the novelty is that they perform the choreography while seated.

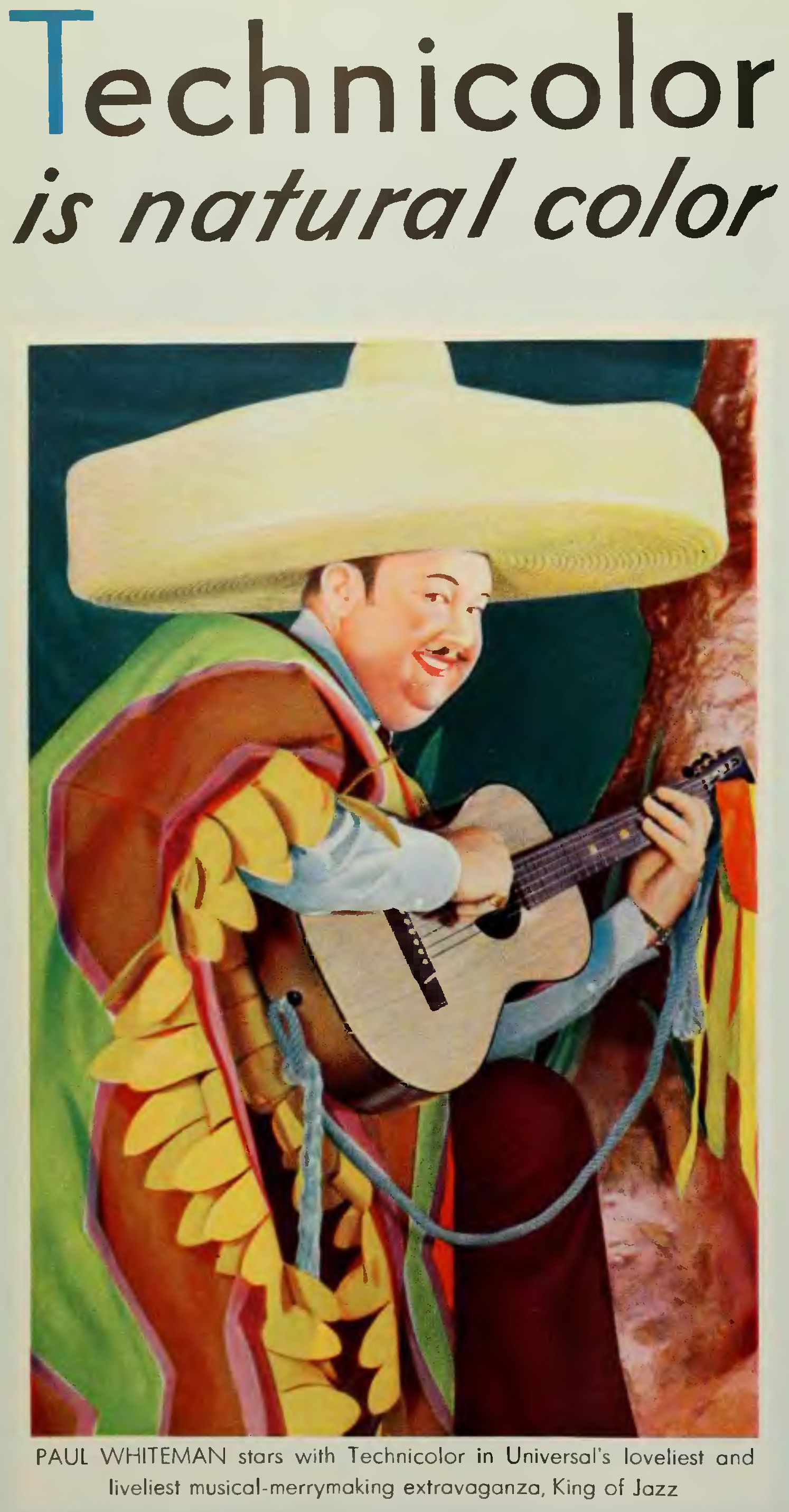
Paul Whiteman stars in the King of Jazz ad from The Film Daily, 1930

The grand finale is the "Melting Pot of Music" production number, in which various immigrant groups in national costume offer brief renditions of characteristic songs from their native lands, after which they are all consigned to the American melting pot. Performers from some of the earlier musical numbers briefly reprise their acts while reporting for duty as fuel under the pot. Whiteman stirs the steaming stew. When the cooking is complete, everyone emerges transformed into a jazz-happy American.

There are a couple of early examples of the overhead views later elaborated and made famous by Busby Berkeley, but this film bears little resemblance to his films and other musicals of the later 1930s. It is very much a stage presentation, albeit on a very large stage, and visual interest is maintained only by changes of viewpoint. The cameras do not move. This is not because the Technicolor cameras were heavy and bulky: they contained a single roll of film and were of nearly ordinary size and weight.

King of Jazz was the nineteenth all-talking motion picture filmed entirely in two-color Technicolor rather than simply including color sequences. At the time, Technicolor's two-color process employed red and green dyes, each with a dash of other colors mixed in, but no blue dye. King of Jazz was to showcase a spectacular presentation of George Gershwin's "Rhapsody in Blue", so this presented a problem. Fortunately, the green dye Technicolor used can actually appear peacock blue (cyan) under some conditions, but acceptable results in this case would require very careful handling. Art director Herman Rosse and production director John Murray Anderson came up with solutions. Tests were made of various fabrics and pigments, and by using an all gray-and-silver background the bluish aspect of the dye was set off to best advantage. Filters were also used to inject pale blues into the scene being filmed. The goal was to produce a finished film with pastel shades rather than bright colors. Nevertheless, as it appears in an original two-color Technicolor print, the sequence might best be described as a "Rhapsody in Turquoise". Later prints made from the original two-component negative, which had survived, make the blues look truer and more saturated than they appeared to audiences in 1930.

King of Jazz marked the first film appearance of the popular crooner and singer Bing Crosby, who, at the time, was a member of The Rhythm Boys, the Whiteman Orchestra's vocal trio. Crosby was scheduled to sing "Song of the Dawn" in the film but a motor accident led to him being jailed for a time and the song was given to John Boles.

=== Music ===
Composer Ferde Grofé, best known for his Grand Canyon Suite, was, in these early years, a well-known arranger/songwriter for Whiteman. He is documented to have arranged some of the music, and may in fact have composed some of the incidental music.

The film preserves a vaudeville bit by Whiteman band trombonist Wilbur Hall, who does novelty playing on violin and bicycle pump, as well as the eccentric dancing of "Rubber Legs" Al Norman to the tune of "Happy Feet".

=== Versions ===
There were at least nine different foreign language versions of the film. Reportedly, the Swedish version has at least some different music.

=== Animated segment ===
The film included the first Technicolor animated cartoon segment, by animators Walter Lantz (later famous for Woody Woodpecker and other characters) and Bill Nolan. In this cartoon, Whiteman is hunting "in darkest Africa", where he is chased by a lion which he soothes by playing a tune on a violin ("Music Hath Charms", played by Joe Venuti and Eddie Lang). After an elephant squirts water on a monkey in a tree, the monkey throws a coconut at the elephant. It misses and hits Whiteman on the head. The bump on his head forms into a crown. Master of Ceremonies Charles Irwin then remarks, "And that's how Paul Whiteman was crowned the King of Jazz."

My Pal Paul, a cartoon promoting the film.

One of the characters making a brief appearance in the cartoon is Oswald the Lucky Rabbit, the star of the Universal Studios animation department led by Lantz. A black-and-white sound cartoon featuring Oswald, titled My Pal Paul, also released in 1930 by Universal, promoted King of Jazz by including songs from the film and a cartoon Paul Whiteman character.

Some of the scenes from the animated cartoon sequence would be later re-used for a later Walter Lantz Oswald Cartoon, Africa.

== Soundtrack ==
King of Jazz was the first feature-length film to use a mostly pre-recorded soundtrack made independently of the actual filming. Whiteman insisted that musical numbers featuring his orchestra should be pre-recorded to obtain the best sound, avoiding the poor recording conditions and extraneous noises typical of a movie studio sound stage. Universal opposed the idea, but Whiteman prevailed over the reluctant studio executives. After the sound was recorded, it was played back through a loudspeaker while the scene was being filmed and the performers matched their actions to the recording. Later, the resulting film was synchronized with the soundtrack. This also allowed the scene to be shot in the same manner as a silent film, with the director free to shout out instructions during the filming and the camera unrestricted by any need to silence its noises with bulky soundproofing.

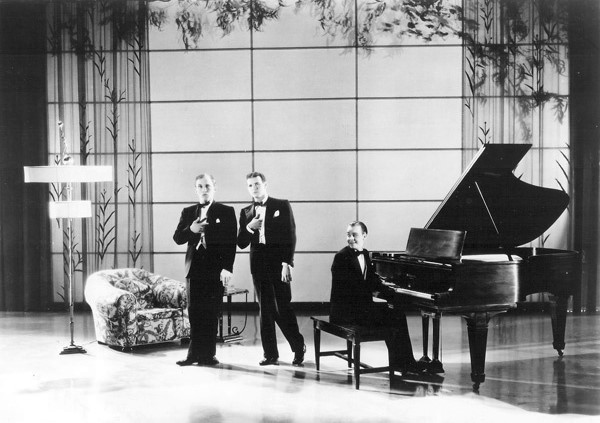
The Rhythm Boys

Delbert Cobain, one of the singers in the film who appeared in the finale "Melting Pot of Music" singing "Killarney" in Irish, is notable as being the great-uncle of musician Kurt Cobain (the late vocalist and guitarist of Nirvana).

=== The Rhythm Boys ===
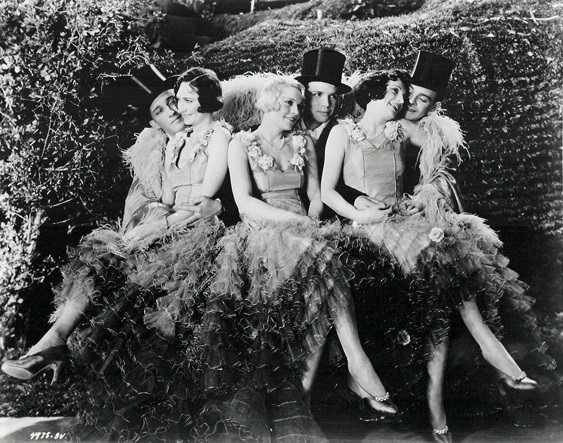
The Brox Sisters and the Rhythm Boys

The Rhythm Boys (Bing Crosby, Harry Barris, and Al Rinker) sang "Mississippi Mud", "So the Bluebirds and the Blackbirds Got Together", "I'm a Fisherman", and "Happy Feet", and performed backup harmonies for the Brox Sisters on "A Bench in the Park." This singing trio also recorded as part of Whiteman's band and on their own with Barris on piano. Bing Crosby went on several benders during the filming, crashed his car on Hollywood Boulevard, nearly killing his female passenger, and after showing up in golf attire, and wise-cracking to a judge, was sent to jail for 60 days. Whiteman replaced him with John Boles for "The Song Of The Dawn".

== Release ==
PLAY film's original trailer; runtime 00:03:42.

The film debuted on April 19, 1930, at the Criterion Theater in Los Angeles. Box-office receipts at this theater were below expectations within the first two weeks.

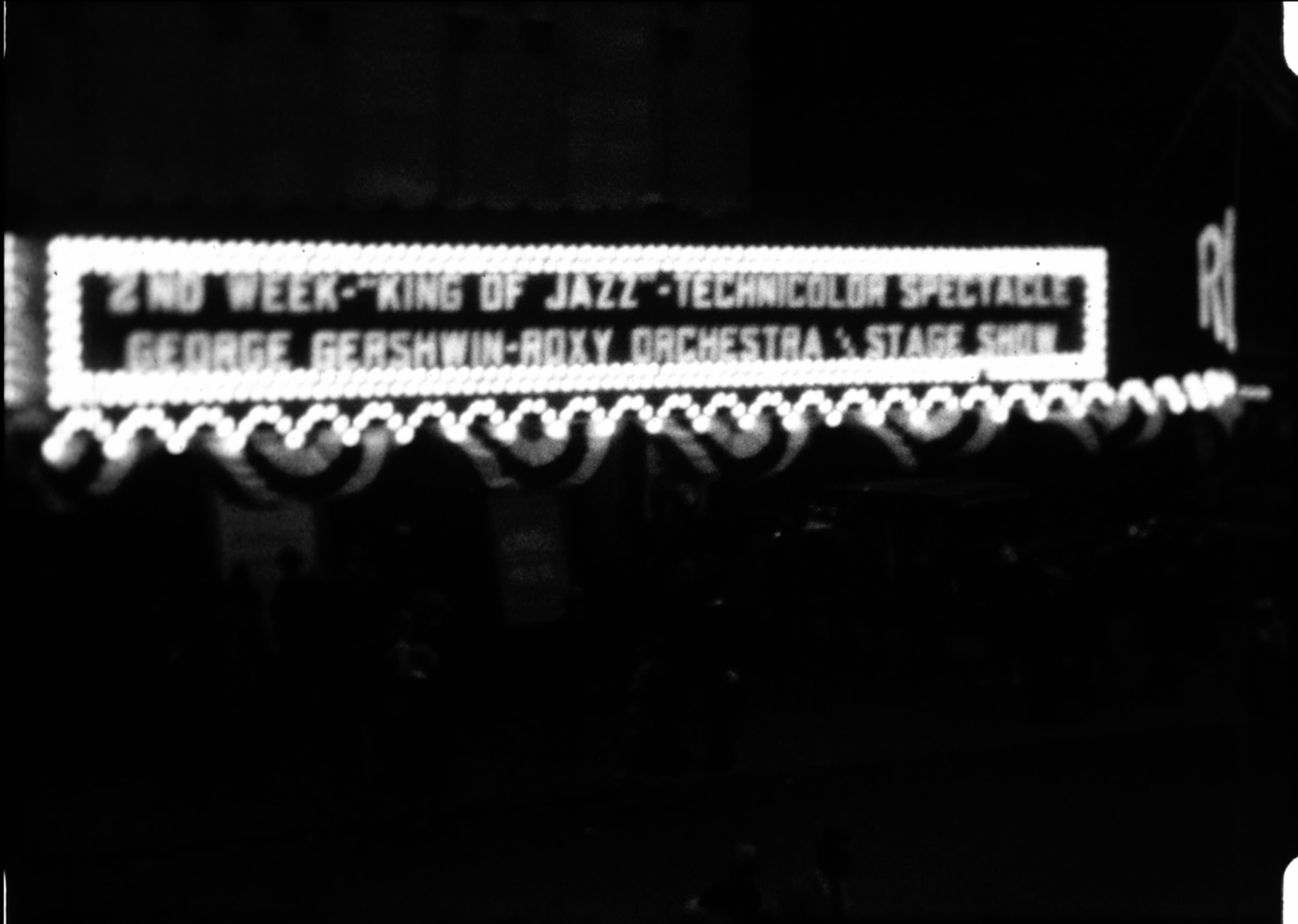
Marquee announcing the film's second and final week at the Roxy Theatre in New York City.

A grand premiere was held on May 2, 1930, at the Roxy Theatre in New York City, where the Whiteman Orchestra, together with George Gershwin and the 125-piece Roxy Symphony Orchestra, put on a stage show. It featured the Rhapsody in Blue and Mildred Bailey backed by the Roxy Chorus and was performed five times a day, between showings of the film, for a week. The film continued to play at the Roxy for only one additional week.

As originally released, the film was 105 minutes long. The 1933 reissue was 65 minutes. Several entire sequences and numbers were removed for the reissue, while others were trimmed of just a few shots. One cut for the 1933 re-release was a sketch with William Kent about a suicidal flute player, with the Whiteman Orchestra performing Caprice Viennois as background music.

The 2016 restoration runs 98 minutes with two minutes of playout music. Some sections were cut before the film's 1930 release and never seen by the general public. They include:

- A specialty number featuring Nell O'Day, with unknown music, set in a cabaret lobby.
- A segment featuring Grace Hayes singing My Lover.

A 93-minute version, cobbled together from the 65-minute negative and a 16mm print was used for the videocassette release of the film in 1983. Prints of the original uncut version still survive. The Criterion Collection had released the film on DVD and Blu-ray in March 2018. The Blu-ray version has a 4K restoration of the film and includes both the original film and two Oswald the Lucky Rabbit cartoons as well as both 1929 stage version and 1933 short featuring Whiteman and his band.

== Reception ==
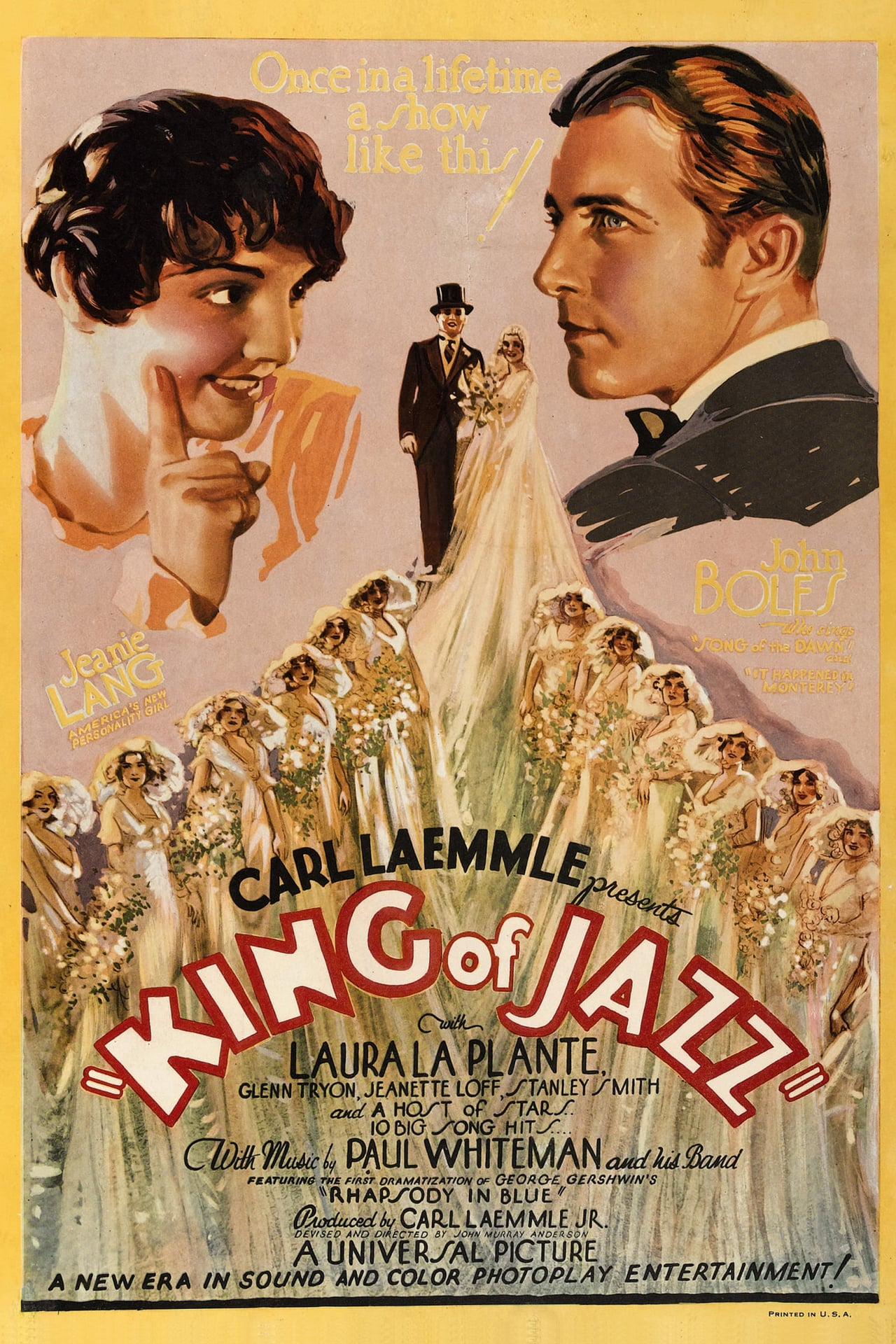
Theatrical release window card poster

Universal expected this revue to repeat or surpass the box-office performance of a musical entitled Broadway which it had released in 1929. That lavish film had included Technicolor sequences and had been a success. Unfortunately, delays in beginning the filming of King of Jazz caused its release to occur after two unforeseen developments. First, the public had tired of the flood of movie musicals that began as a slow trickle with The Jazz Singer in late 1927 and rapidly became a torrent after the success of The Broadway Melody in early 1929. In particular disfavor were operettas set in bygone eras, musical comedies which were unimaginatively filmed Broadway stage productions, and plotless "revues" such as King of Jazz. Second, although the ripple effects from the stock market crash in October 1929 had not yet produced the full-blown Great Depression which would soon be painfully obvious, people were already spending less freely and the effects were starting to be felt at the box office. During its national release, King of Jazz cleared less than $900,000. Around Hollywood, the movie came to be called "Universal's Rhapsody in the Red". Because of poor box-office receipts for the film and the cancellation of his lucrative nationally broadcast radio program by its sponsor in April 1930, Whiteman had to let ten band members go and cut the salaries of the remaining band members by fifteen percent.

The film received mixed reviews. A reviewer for The New Movie called it a lavish, over-produced "disappointment"; an overlong, "dull mélange" whose only effective performers were Whiteman and John Boles. In contrast, the New York Times asserted that "John Murray Anderson's initial contribution to the audible screen, 'King of Jazz', with the rotund Paul Whiteman, reveals this director to be a magician of far greater powers than one imagined, even from his stage compositions. This Technicolor potpourri of songs, dancing and fun is a marvel of camera wizardry, joyous color schemes, charming costumes and seductive lighting effects." The reviewer, Mordaunt Hall, further praised the film for having "nothing imitative", added that "Mr. Anderson has visualized the full possibilities of the camera in connection with his flights of fancy", and concluded "there is no sequence that isn't worth witnessing and no performance that is not capable in this fastpaced picture".

Overseas, where there was never a backlash against musicals, it fared better and eventually made a profit. During the 1930s, the film found its best audience in Cape Town, South Africa, where it played seventeen return engagements.

The film won an Academy Award for Best Art Direction by Herman Rosse. Other films nominated in this category were Bulldog Drummond, The Love Parade, Sally and The Vagabond King.

In 2016 the film's restoration was completed and a preservation print and digital copy was included in the Library of Congress for the National Film Registry alongside an old technicolor print that the Library of Congress has.

== See also ==
- List of early color feature films
