= Now's the Time (film) =

1932 film

- Directed by: Harry Edwards
- Written by: Carl Harbaugh; George Waggner
- Produced by: Al Christie
- Starring: Edgar Kennedy; Harry Barris; Mary Carlisle
- Distributed by: Educational Pictures
- Release date: June 12, 1932
- Running time: 2 reels
- Country: United States
- Language: English

Now's the Time is a 1932 short musical comedy film starring Harry Barris with Mary Carlisle as his leading lady. Its title is taken from its theme song, the popular Eddie Cantor song "Now's the Time to Fall in Love." Its working title was Love Nuts.

== Plot ==
A summary from Motion Picture Herald reads:

The comedy concerns a girl with whom Barris falls in love, her sister, and the latter's husband, played by the big and big-voiced Edgar Kennedy, who believes Barris is making advances toward his wife and pursues him with a large shotgun. It goes off at the wrong time, of course.

== Cast ==
- Edgar Kennedy
- Harry Barris
- Mary Carlisle

== Reception ==
"This Harry Barris comedy contains more really funny gags than any of the previous things in which he has been featured," a critic wrote for Photoplay. "It's fast and funny," a writer for The Film Daily claimed, "and about the best short that Barris has appeared in."
