= Entangled (Partington) =

- Artist: Brose Partington
- Year: 2004
- Type: Steel
- Dimensions: 270 cm × 61 cm × 240 cm (9 ft × 2 ft × 8 ft)
- Location: Indianapolis, Indiana, United States; 39°46.289′N 86°10.367′W
- Owner: Indiana University-Purdue University Indianapolis

Entangled, 2004, is an abstract sculpture created by Indiana-based artist Brose Partington (American b. 1979). The sculpture is located on the Indiana University-Purdue University Indianapolis (IUPUI) campus at the Herron School of Art and Design, 735 W. New York Street in Indianapolis, Indiana, in the United States. It was given to Herron by Ezra Freidlander and Linda H. Freidlander in 2005.

== Description ==
Entangled is an abstract sculpture consisting of eight unique elements bolted together to create an enclosed form. The powder coated steel sculpture measures 108” x 88” x 98” and is constructed from rolled steel tubes and fabricated steel circles. The base of the sculpture is mounted on a 16' diameter concrete pad in the Herron Sculpture Garden. The curved support structure at the base of the sculpture references the shape of a bird's nest as it encloses and supports the sculptural elements.

The Freidlander donors contributed to the funding for a sculpture competition open to upper level Herron students. Partington's maquette of Entangled won the competition. The sculpture was located on their private property from 2004 to 2008. It was moved to its current location on the IUPUI campus in 2008.

== Artist statement ==
“I'm currently building structures as parallels to patterns of natural occurrences. My work examines the subtle movements around us, and the patterns those movements create. I am trying to compare the cyclical patterns found in nature with manufactured objects, environments, and modes of transportation." ~Brose Partington, 2009

Partington's father owned a clock repair shop in Indianapolis during his childhood. The clocks, gears, and mechanisms of his father's shop influence his sculptures today. Most of his current work is kinetic with references to the patterns of nature. Tides, a work shown internationally, is an example of the relationship between nature and machine found throughout Partington's installations.

== Documentation ==
A Museum Studies course at IUPUI recently undertook the project of researching and reporting on the condition of 40 outdoor sculptures on the university campus. Entangled was included in this movement. This documentation was influenced by the successful Save Outdoor Sculpture! 1989 campaign organized by Heritage Preservation: The National Institute of Conservation partnered with the Smithsonian Institution, specifically the Smithsonian American Art Museum. Throughout the 1990s, over 7,000 volunteers nationwide have cataloged and assessed the condition of over 30,000 publicly accessible statues, monuments, and sculptures installed as outdoor public art across the United States.

== See also ==
- Dawnsong
