= Eleanor and Karla Gutöhrlein =

German dancers and actors

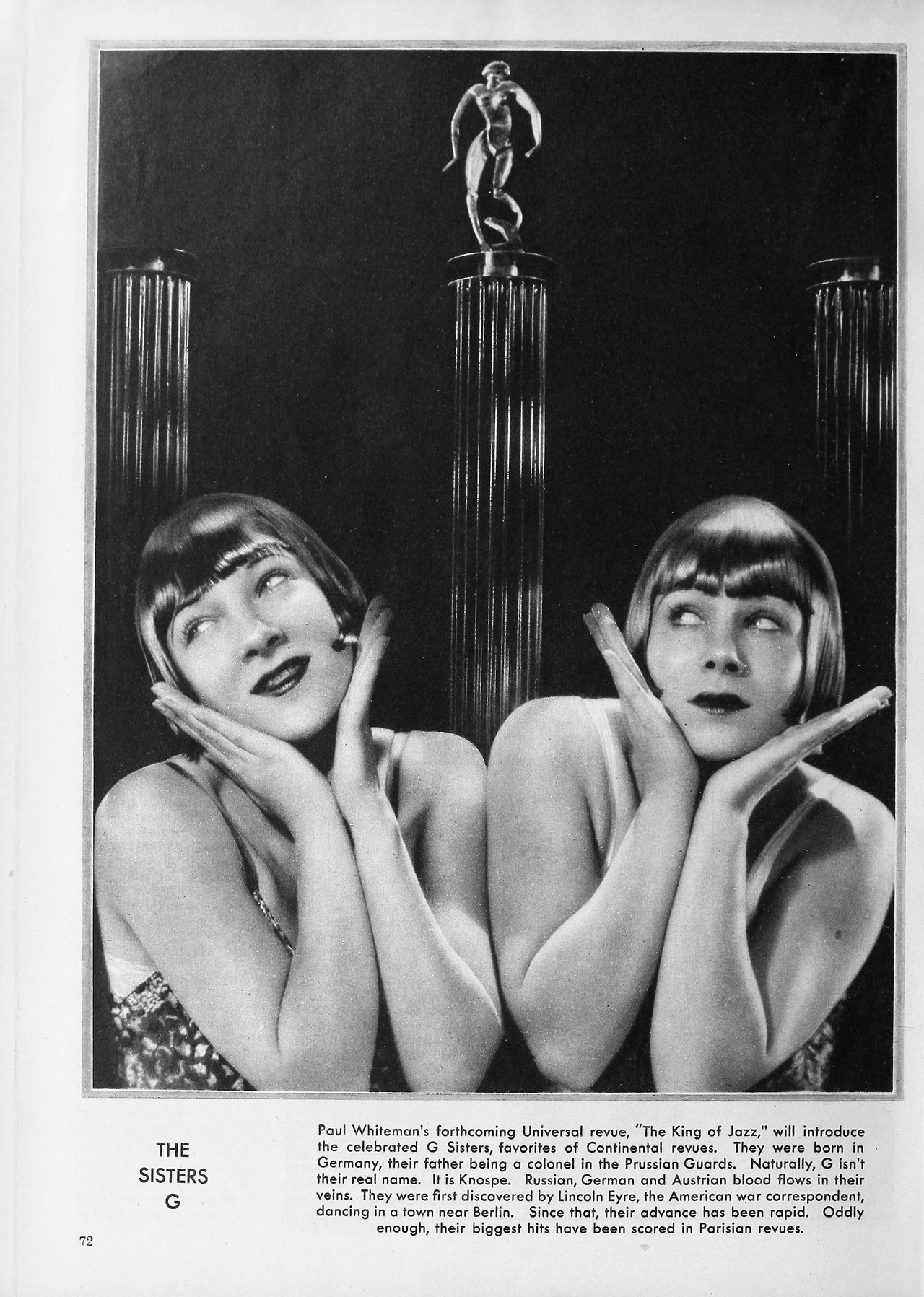
The Sisters G - Eleanor and Karla Gutöhrlein - as seen in 1930's King of Jazz.

Eleanor Helene Emma Gutöhrlein (18 August 1909 – 7 June 1997) and Karola (Karla) Elisabet Charlotta Gutöhrlein (9 September 1910 – 17 June 2002) were German-born sisters who danced and acted together in several 1930s films. They were sometimes billed as "The Sisters G".

The sisters were born in Germany as Eleanor and Karla Knospe. Eleanor and Karla differed more than a year in age, but were often thought to be twins. They were famous for performing together, for having bobbed haircuts, and for their dancing and acting skills. They performed in several American films including King of Jazz (1930), Recaptured Love (1930), and God's Gift to Women (1931).

The sisters moved to Sweden. Eleanor married the bank director Gösta Lennart Brynolf and died on 7 June 1997 in Stockholm, Sweden. Karla married Per Oskar Olof Åberg in 1936. They had a daughter together on 18 April 1940 in Gothenburg, Sweden named Viveka Margareta Svea Persdotter Åberg. Karla later remarried on 8 August 1946 in Adolf Fredrik Church to Karl Martin Lennart Lindeberg. Karla died on 17 June 2002 in Oslo, Norway.
