= Dawnsong =

Public artwork by Brose Partington

Dawnsong (Bike Rack)
- Artist: Brose Partington
- Year: 2008
- Type: Aluminum, Painted steel, Vinyl siding, and shingles
- Location: Indianapolis Art Center; Indianapolis, Indiana, United States
- Owner: Indianapolis Art Center

Dawnsong is a public artwork by American artist Brose Partington, located at Indianapolis Art Center in Indianapolis, Indiana, United States. Dawnsong was installed as part of the center's ARTSPARK initiative.

== Description ==
Dawnsong is a kinetic sculpture that serves as an interactive bike rack. A steel obelisk with a hand-crank on it juts upwards with a birdhouse resting on the top. The aluminum bird house has multiple holes throughout its multiple "stories." When the hand-crank is turned the house expands and contracts slightly. The sculpture is placed at the Efroymson Canoe Launch area along the White River near the Monon Trail.

== Acquisition ==
This piece was placed in conjunction with the center's ARTSPARK which brings together art and nature. Partington worked alongside the City of Indianapolis to plan this work of art.

== Information ==
This sculpture is representative of the artist's interest in urban sprawl. According to Partington: "In Dawnsong, I am taking the multioccupancy home and through a series of gears and a hand-crank allowing the viewer to transform it into a single, more suburban home. Through this cyclical pattern, it creates the effect of a developing or dissolving community."

== See also ==
- Entangled
