= Song of the Dawn =

Song by John Boles, Bing Crosby
- Language: English
- Published: 1930
- Composer: Milton Ager
- Lyricist: Jack Yellen

"Song of the Dawn" was a 1930 song, first introduced in the musical film King of Jazz. The song was originally written for Bing Crosby, who lost the part to John Boles, another actor in the film, due to Crosby being jailed for a motoring offence.

Crosby recorded the song commercially on March 21, 1930 with Paul Whiteman and his Orchestra. John Boles also recorded the song for commercial issue.

Al Bowlly recorded the song on August 2, 1930 with Hubert Wallace and the Aldwych Players directed by Jay Wilbur. Other recordings were by Jack Hylton, Phil Spitalny's Music, George Olsen and his Music, Earl Burtnett and his Orchestra and Frank Chacksfield and His Orchestra.
