= The Rhythm Boys =

American male singing trio

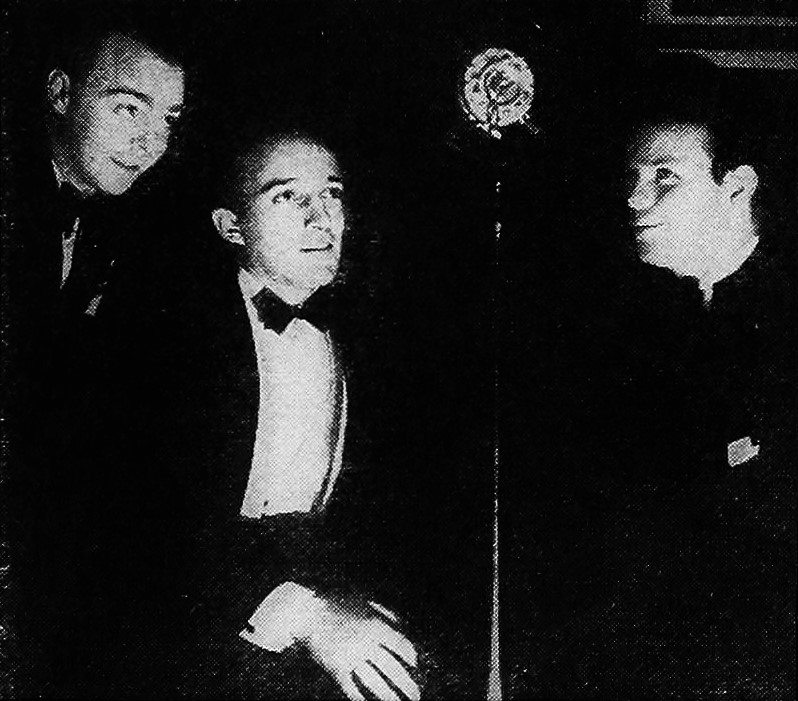
- Left to right: Harry Barris, Bing Crosby, and Al Rinker

Background information
- Origin: New York City, US
- Genre: Popular
- Years active: 1927–1930, 1943
- Labels: Victor, Columbia
- Past members: Bing Crosby; Harry Barris; Al Rinker

Excerpt from "Sweet Li'l / Ain't She Sweet"
The Rhythm Boys scat together at first, then each member has a solo: Harry Barris, Al Rinker, and Bing Crosby.

The Rhythm Boys were an American male singing trio consisting of Bing Crosby, Harry Barris and Al Rinker. Crosby and Rinker began performing together in 1925 and were recruited by Paul Whiteman in late 1926. Pianist/singer-songwriter Barris joined the team in 1927. They made a number of recordings with the Whiteman Orchestra and released singles in their own right with Barris on piano. They appeared with the Whiteman orchestra in the film King of Jazz (Universal Pictures, 1930), in which they sang "Mississippi Mud", "So the Bluebirds and the Blackbirds Got Together", "A Bench in the Park", and "Happy Feet". They are best remembered for launching Crosby's solo career, one that would make him the greatest song charting act in history and one of the most influential entertainers of the twentieth century.

== Beginnings ==
Al Rinker's high school band called the Musicaladers (musical aiders) had to let go of their drummer. Coincidentally, Crosby had bought a set of drums and learned to play. Rinker learned about Crosby and that he was pretty good and Crosby joined the band. They had mixed success and Crosby was slowly finding less interest in becoming a lawyer, his original career path. They drove Rinker's Model T to Los Angeles where Rinker's sister, Mildred Bailey, a locally known jazz singer, was working. Shortly after their arrival, they landed a gig on the vaudeville circuit, as a vocal act.

Crosby and Rinker began as a minor part of The Syncopation Idea, a short revue put out by the Fanchon and Marco agency, and it was there that they started to develop as entertainers. They had a lively and individual style and they were particularly popular with college students. After The Syncopation Idea closed, Bing and Al obtained work in the Will Morrissey Music Hall Revue. Their skills were further honed during their time with Morrissey and when they subsequently had the chance to present their own independent act, they blossomed. Some members of Paul Whiteman's Orchestra caught their act and recommended them to him. Whiteman hired them in October 1926. While waiting to join Whiteman's Orchestra they made their first record, "I've Got the Girl", with Don Clark's Orchestra (a former member of Whiteman's Orchestra) at The Biltmore Hotel in Los Angeles (506 South Grand Ave.). Bing and Al then joined the Whiteman Orchestra in Chicago, where they made their first records with Whiteman.

At that time, it was felt that Whiteman needed something different to break up the musical selections he was presenting, and Crosby and Rinker filled this requirement. After less than a year in full-time show business, they had acquired considerable success.

== Reception and time with Whiteman ==
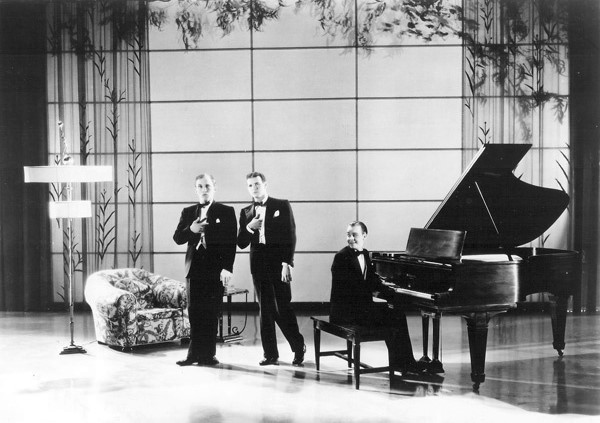
The Rhythm Boys performing "So the Bluebirds and the Blackbirds Got Together" in the 1930 film King of Jazz

Initial successes with Whiteman were followed by disaster when they reached New York as they could not be heard in the large Paramount Theater. However, the addition of Harry Barris made all the difference to the act and Paul Whiteman's Rhythm Boys were born. The additional voice meant that the boys could be heard more easily in the large New York theaters and they quickly became a real success. The trio sang in three-part harmony with both Rinker and Barris playing the piano. Barris wrote a song called "Mississippi Mud" in 1927. They recorded it the same year as a medley with "I Left My Sugar Standing in the Rain" without the orchestra. The Whiteman Orchestra later recorded a hit version featuring Bix Beiderbecke on cornet and Irene Taylor singing along with the Rhythm Boys.

A year touring with Whiteman provided valuable experience and then they were sent out on tour alone. Much has been written about the escapades of the three men during this period and clearly, they were living life to the full. Despite all of this, Crosby was continuing to develop and when the Rhythm Boys rejoined the Whiteman troupe in 1929, he had matured considerably as a performer. He was constantly in demand as a solo artist on record and radio. An offer to go out on his own was, however, refused by Crosby and he stayed faithful to the Rhythm Boys. Whiteman had decided to re-employ the trio because he had signed up with Old Gold Cigarettes to deliver a weekly hour-long show on Tuesdays nights over CBS from station WABC in New York. The Old Gold people especially requested the presence of Crosby and the Rhythm Boys on the show and Whiteman reemployed them at $900 per week.

The group performing in King of Jazz (1930)

The Old Gold Radio Hour had its first broadcast on February 5, 1929, and the Rhythm Boys appeared every week until April 15, 1930. The famous trip to Hollywood in mid-1929 aboard the Whiteman Old Gold Special followed their return to Whiteman and Crosby started to become noticed in Hollywood. Early screen tests were unsuccessful but the Rhythm Boys carved out a reputation as they starred at the Montmartre Cafe for several weeks. The delays in filming King of Jazz led Whiteman and the Rhythm Boys to return to the east coast for a while, but then they all returned to California at the end of October 1929 to finally begin filming. Around this time, Crosby was jailed following a car crash as he had been drinking and he lost a solo spot in King of Jazz to John Boles. The Rhythm Boys did, however, have a couple of featured spots in the film and Crosby also sang over the opening titles.

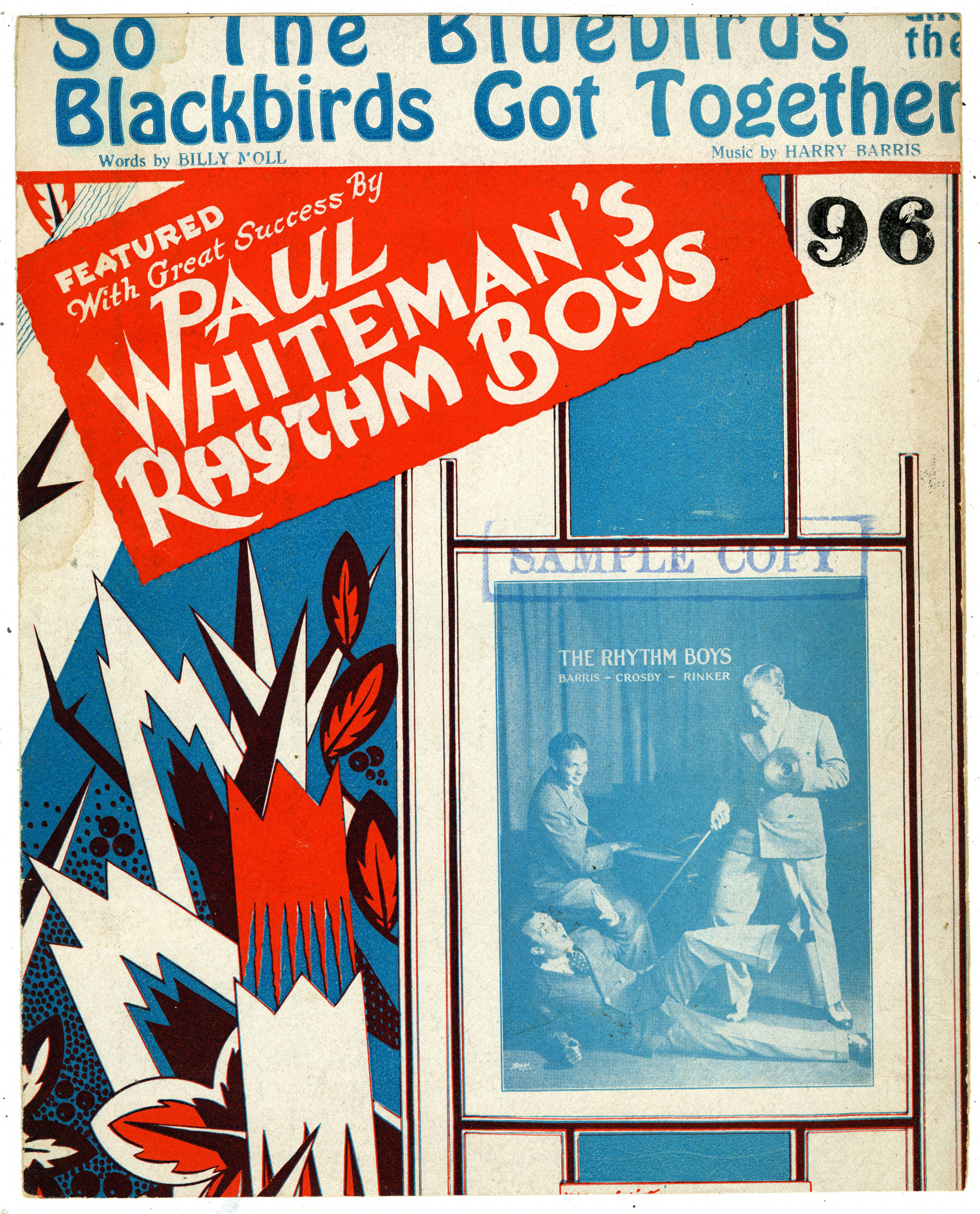
Sheet music cover for "So The Bluebirds and the Blackbirds Got Together" (1929) by Harry Barris and Billy Moll, performed by Paul Whiteman's Rhythm Boys.

== Last performances and break-up ==
After completing filming, Whiteman took his troupe up the West Coast to Seattle prior to returning east for the New York premiere of King of Jazz. However, the lure of his girlfriend, Dixie, and of the sunshine in California proved too strong for Crosby, so he and the Rhythm Boys left Whiteman in Portland, Oregon in April 1930, and returned to Los Angeles. (A year or two later, Whiteman formed another group called Paul Whiteman's Rhythm Boys which had Ray Kulz, Jimmy Noel and George MacDonald as the vocalists. They were soon augmented by the deeper voice of Al Dary and this enhanced group also recorded "Mississippi Mud" (Victor 36199) which caused confusion among collectors.)

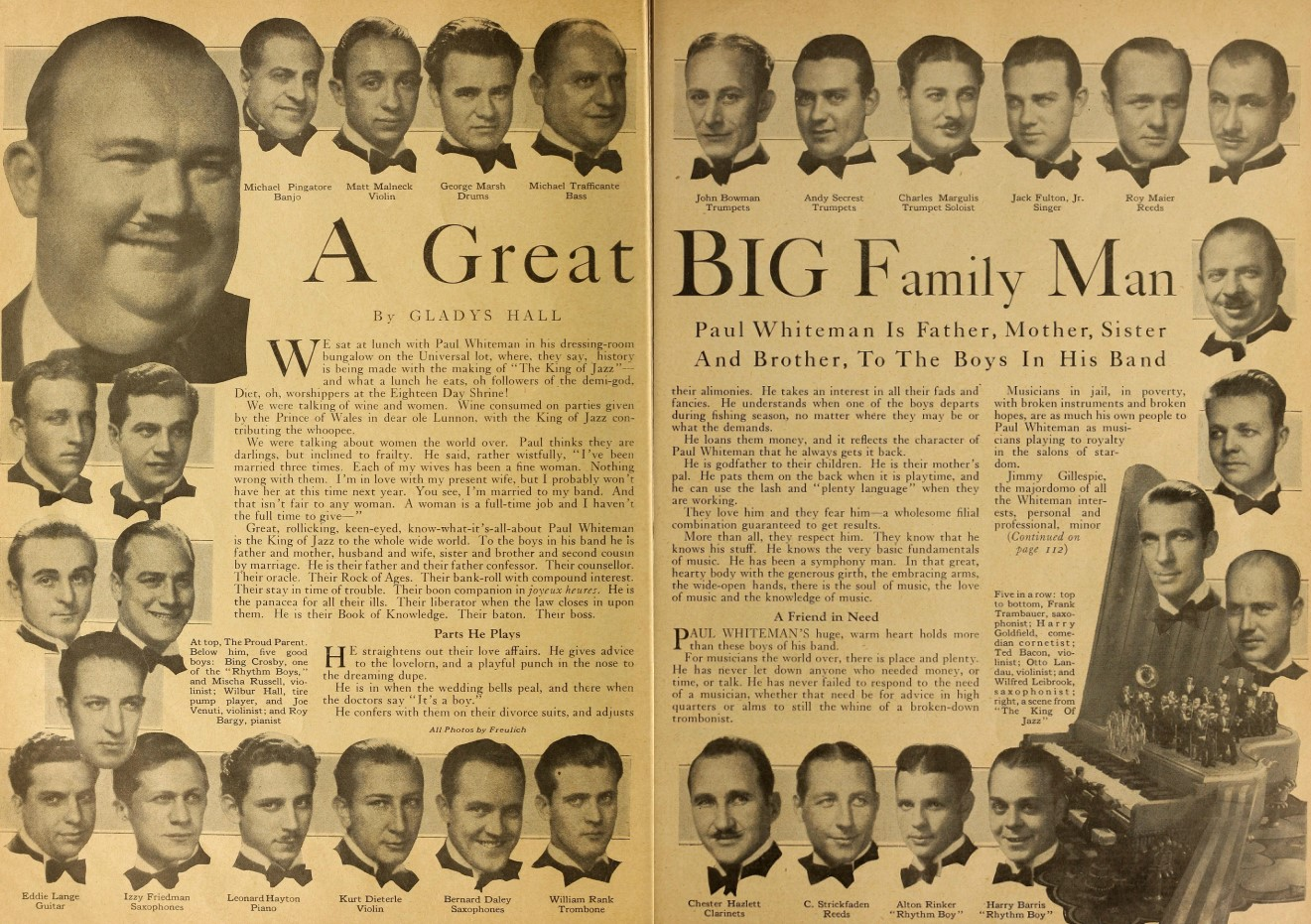
Paul Whiteman Orchestra – Motion Picture, June 1930

Although some books indicate that the original Rhythm Boys act then went into the Montmartre, there may be confusion with their earlier appearance there in 1929. They did appear on local radio and sing for film soundtracks, but it was not until they went into the Cocoanut Grove at the Ambassador Hotel in July 1930 "that the action picked up a little," to quote Crosby. Singing with the Gus Arnheim Orchestra, Crosby's solos began to steal the show, while the Rhythm Boys act gradually became redundant. In late 1930, they were called in on short notice for Check and Double Check, in which they sing but do not appear (the Duke Ellington orchestra lip synced their performance); Crosby was initially to be the sole singer, but director Melville Brown concluded "this guy can't sing" and brought the whole trio in. They recorded one song, "Them There Eyes", with Arnheim's Orchestra for RCA Victor in November 1930. They appeared in the 1931 film Confessions of a Co-Ed where they sang "Ya Got Love" and Crosby sang "Out of Nowhere". Radio broadcasts over station KNX from the Cocoanut Grove made Crosby famous on the West Coast, but his drinking problems and risky behaviors caused him to start missing performances and his pay was docked. The trio failed to turn up for their scheduled appearance at the Cocoanut Grove on Saturday, May 16, 1931, and it became clear that they had walked out on their contract. They stated that their six-month contract had expired but they did not know or had forgotten that a nine-month option existed. Apparently, a more lucrative contract was in prospect at the Roosevelt Hotel. Crosby described what happened in his book Call Me Lucky:

Toward the end of our engagement at the Grove we didn't take our responsibilities seriously enough to suit Abe Frank. Frank was running the Cocoanut Grove and The Ambassador Hotel. But the Grove was his pet. He was an elderly, serious sort who disliked anything that disrupted the even tenor of the nightly routine at the Grove. When people were supposed to appear, he expected them to be on deck. So, when I failed to get back for the Tuesday-night show once too often, he docked my wages. Of course, Abe was within his rights legalistically speaking, but I thought he was pretty small about it, so I quit. I was encouraged in this defiance by an offer from Mack Sennett to make a series of movie shorts for him. I had made one for him already, and working in pictures looked like easy money to me. I made a couple more shorts at Sennett's, then Abe Frank plastered a union ban on me, "for failure to fulfill the standard musician's contract." After that, union musicians weren't allowed to work with me.

Rinker commented on the situation too: "By that time the drive was gone from the Rhythm Boys. We were each developing different interests. Harry was writing songs. Bing was playing golf. I was becoming interested in the production end of the business. We felt the Rhythm Boys was a stage in our lives and now it was over.

The Rhythm Boys broke up and went their separate ways. Crosby's solo career took off after the break-up and the union ban was lifted. Crosby went on to become a massive and successful entertainer of the twentieth century.

== Discography ==
1. Side By Side (April 29, 1927)
2. Magnolia (May 24, 1927)
3. Mississippi Mud / I Left My Sugar Standing in the Rain (June 20, 1927) (the first time the trio were billed as Paul Whiteman's Rhythm Boys)
4. Sweet Li'l / Ain't She Sweet (June 20, 1927)
5. The Five Step (August 16, 1927)
6. It Won't Be Long Now (August 20, 1927)
7. That's Grandma (November 11, 1927)
8. Miss Annabelle Lee (November 17, 1927)
9. Changes (November 23, 1927) (along with "sweet" trio Jack Fulton, Charles Gaylord, and Austin Young)
10. From Monday On (January 12, 1928)
11. What Price Lyrics (March 1, 1928)
12. Wa Da Da (June 19, 1928)
13. That's Grandma (June 19, 1928)
14. My Suppressed Desire (November 10, 1928)
15. Rhythm King (November 10, 1928)
16. So the Bluebirds and the Blackbirds Got Together (April 10, 1929)
17. Louise (April 10, 1929)
18. Happy Feet (February 10, 1930)
19. A Bench in the Park (with the Brox Sisters) (March 23, 1930)
20. I Like to Do Things for You (March 23, 1930)
21. A Bench in the Park (May 23, 1930)
22. Three Little Words (August 26, 1930)
23. Them There Eyes (November 20, 1930)

A broadcast of the Rhythm Boys singing "Everything's Agreed Upon" on the Walter O'Keefe Show from May 1930 exists and is available on YouTube.

== Reunions ==
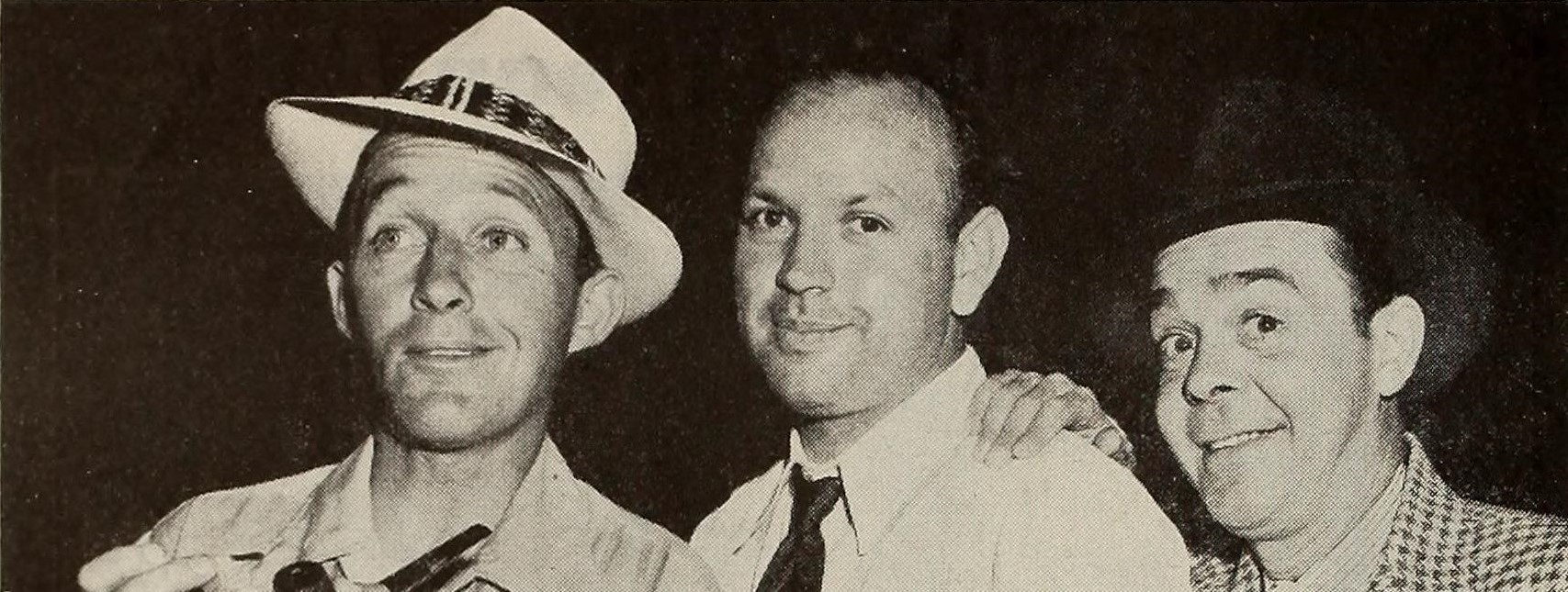
The Rhythm Boys (Bing Crosby, Al Rinker and Harry Barris) during their one-song reunion in 1943

Harry Barris made regular appearances in Crosby's films over the next 13 years. The Rhythm Boys reunited briefly to appear on the Paul Whiteman Presents radio show broadcast on July 4, 1943, when they sang "Mississippi Mud".

== Sidelight ==
Harry Barris was the uncle of television personality and producer Chuck Barris.

== Sources ==
- Donald Shepherd and Robert F. Slatzer, Bing Crosby: The Hollow Man (New York: St. Martin's Press, 1981) ISBN 978-0-523-42164-3
- Giddins, Gary, Bing Crosby – A Pocketful of Dreams – The Early Years 1903–1940 (New York: (Little Brown and Company, 2001) ISBN 0-316-88188-0
