= Mississippi Mud =

Song written by Harry Barris

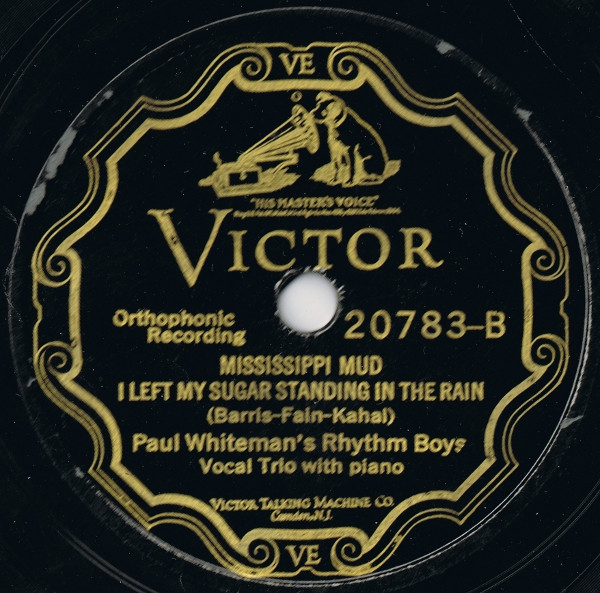
- 1927 release as Victor 20783-B by Paul Whiteman's Rhythm Boys.

Song by Bing Crosby
- Released: 1927
- Recorded: June 20, 1927
- Length: 3:01
- Label: Victor
- Songwriter: Harry Barris

"Mississippi Mud"
Original 1927 recording by The Rhythm Boys

"Mississippi Mud" is a 1927 song written by Harry Barris, first sung by Bing Crosby as a member of Paul Whiteman's Rhythm Boys. Its musical composition entered the public domain on January 1, 2023.

== Background ==
The Rhythm Boys originally recorded the song on June 20, 1927 in New York for the Victor Talking Machine Company as a medley with "I Left My Sugar Standing in the Rain." It was recorded by Paul Whiteman's orchestra on February 18, 1928 with vocals by Irene Taylor and The Rhythm Boys, featuring Bing Crosby, and with Bix Beiderbecke on cornet. Two takes from the June 20, 1927 session were released on Victor.

Frankie Trumbauer and His Orchestra recorded the song in New York City on January 20, 1928 for Okeh Records featuring Bing Crosby on vocals, Bix Beiderbecke cornet, Charlie Margulis on trumpet, Bill Rank on trombone, Frank Trumbauer on c-melody and alto sax, and vocals, Jimmy Dorsey and Chester Hazlett on alto sax, Matty Malneck on violin, Lennie Hayton on piano, Carl Kress on guitar, Min Leibrook on bass sax, and Hal McDonald on drums.

In a 1950s radio interview, Trumbauer stated that this recording featured Bix Beiderbecke's greatest recorded solo.

Paul Tremaine's Orchestra performed "Mississippi Mud" in a 1929 film short. Later, it was also sung briefly by the Rhythm Boys in the 1930 film King of Jazz. The song was also sung in the 1931 Toby the Pup cartoon Down South. The Rhythm Boys, Bing Crosby, Harry Barris, and Al Rinker, performed the song when they reunited on radio in 1943 on the Paul Whiteman Presents radio program. Paul Whiteman re-recorded the song on December 7, 1954 for Coral Records.

== Other recordings ==
The song has been recorded by a number of artists since its first publication, including Frankie Trumbauer and His Orchestra with Bix Beiderbecke and Bing Crosby, Dinah Shore, Si Zentner and his Orchestra and the Johnny Mann Singers, the Charleston Chasers, the Louisiana Rhythm Kings, Kid Ory's Creole Jazz Band, Dean Martin, Bobby Darin and Johnny Mercer with Billy May and His Orchestra, Edyie Gorme, Connie Haines. The Lennon Sisters, Harry Reser's band under the name the Seven Little Polar Bears, Dick Cathcart, the Classic Jazz Quartet (aka The Bourgeois Scum, including Dick Wellstood and Marty Grosz), Joan Shaw, and Ray Charles, and has become one of the standards of the American songbook.

The lyrics were revised because of the derogatory racial term "darkies" in the original. The original lyrics featured a line in the refrain: "When the 'darkies' beat their feet on the Mississippi Mud". This has since been changed to: "When the 'people' beat their feet on the Mississippi Mud."

1927 sheet music, Shapiro, Bernstein and Co., N.Y.

== Television performances ==
Dean Martin and Louis Armstrong performed the song on The Dean Martin Show on NBC on December 9, 1965 as part of a Dixie medley of songs.

The song was performed on the 1958 TV series Father Knows Best starring Robert Young and Jane Wyatt.

The song was performed on the 1963 The Jimmy Dean Show.

The song was featured in the M*A*S*H Season 3 episode "The General Flipped at Dawn," being sung and danced to by Harry Morgan playing Major General Steele.

The song was also featured as the opening number for episode 18 of The Muppet Show (the guest star was Phyllis Diller). It was included on the 1977 The Muppet Show soundtrack album, and on VHS in 1993 on It's the Muppets!: Volume 2 - More Muppets, Please!.

== Movie and Television Appearances ==
The song was performed in the 1930 Universal Pictures musical film The King of Jazz starring Paul Whiteman and His Orchestra and Walter Brennan.

The song appeared in the 1999 film Wild Wild West starring Will Smith and Kevin Kline.

In the Season 3, Episode 1 of M*A*S*H, "The General Flipped at Dawn," the song is performed in the final two scenes.
