= Al Rinker =

American musician (1899–1980)

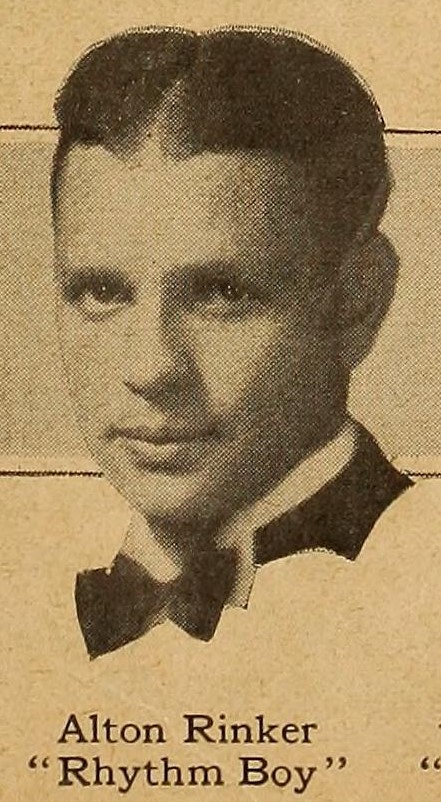
- Rinker in 1930

Background information
- Born: Alton Markwood Rinker; December 20, 1907; Tekoa, Washington, U.S.
- Died: June 11, 1982 (aged 74) Burbank, California
- Genre: popular music
- Occupations: Singer, composer
- Instrument: Piano
- Formerly of: The Rhythm Boys

Alton Markwood "Al" Rinker (December 20, 1907 – June 11, 1982) was an American musician who began his career as a teen performing with Bing Crosby in the early 1920s in Spokane, Washington. In 1925 the pair moved to Los Angeles, eventually forming the Rhythm Boys trio with Harry Barris.

== Biography ==
Rinker was born in Tekoa, Washington; his mother, Josephine, was an enrolled member of the Coeur d'Alene Tribe and a devout Roman Catholic. He and his siblings grew up on the Coeur d'Alene Reservation near De Smet, Idaho.

Their father, Charles, played fiddle and called square dances, and their mother played piano every evening after supper. His younger brother Charles Rinker became a lyricist who worked frequently with composer Gene de Paul. Rinker married Elizabeth Neuberger on October 25, 1938.

Their older sister Mildred, under her married name of Mildred Bailey, had begun a musical career in Los Angeles before Rinker and Crosby became known. She became a well-known jazz singer after the Rhythm Boys arranged for Paul Whiteman to "discover" her singing at a party; he hired her to sing with his band. For a time she was known as "Mrs. Swing."

Barris wrote the songs "Mississippi Mud", "I Surrender, Dear", and "Wrap Your Troubles in Dreams". The singing group worked with Paul Whiteman's Big Band for three years. They went out on their own for a year until Crosby effectively dissolved the group to go solo.

The Rhythm Boys were filmed for the movie King of Jazz (1930) singing "Mississippi Mud", "So the Bluebirds and the Blackbirds Got Together", "A Bench in the Park", and "Happy Feet". According to a filmed interview of Rinker, Crosby performed the first two weeks on his first film while on daytime work release from jail after crashing his car into a telephone pole while driving drunk. After the Rhythm Boys broke up, they reunited once on the Paul Whiteman Presents radio broadcast on July 4, 1943.

== Solo career ==
Al Rinker's enthusiasm for hot jazz never faded, and he pitched a radio series to CBS Radio, The Saturday Night Swing Club. CBS asked Rinker to produce it, and beginning in June 1936 the show became a popular late-night feature on the network. Rinker was already friendly with many musicians on the swing and jazz scene, and invited them to appear on the program. Leith Stevens led the excellent house band, which featured trombonist Wilbur Schwichtenberg (later a big-band star as Will Bradley), saxophonist Toots Mondello, and drummer Billy Gussak. The teenage Leslie Lieber, who played a pennywhistle in hot style, became a program regular. The original announcer was future actor Paul Douglas, succeeded by future sportscaster Mel Allen. Rinker's loose format gave each program the atmosphere of an open-house jam session. The Saturday Night Swing Club became so successful that Vitaphone. Warner Bros.' short-subject department, filmed two one-reel musicals based on the show, The Saturday Night Swing Club and The Saturday Night Swing Club On the Air.

In 1952, a song for which Rinker wrote the music with lyrics by Floyd Huddleston, "You Can't Do Wrong Doin' Right", appeared in the films Push-Button Kitty and The Affairs of Dobie Gillis. "You Can't Do Wrong Doin' Right" also previously appeared in the 1950 film Duchess Of Idaho. He also wrote the song "Everybody Wants to Be a Cat" also with Floyd Huddleston for the Disney animated children's movie The Aristocats (1970).

== Sources ==
- Donald Shepherd and Robert F. Slatzer, Bing Crosby: The Hollow Man (New York: St. Martin's Press, 1981), ISBN 978-0-523-42164-3
