= Harry Barris =

American singer and songwriter (1905–1962)

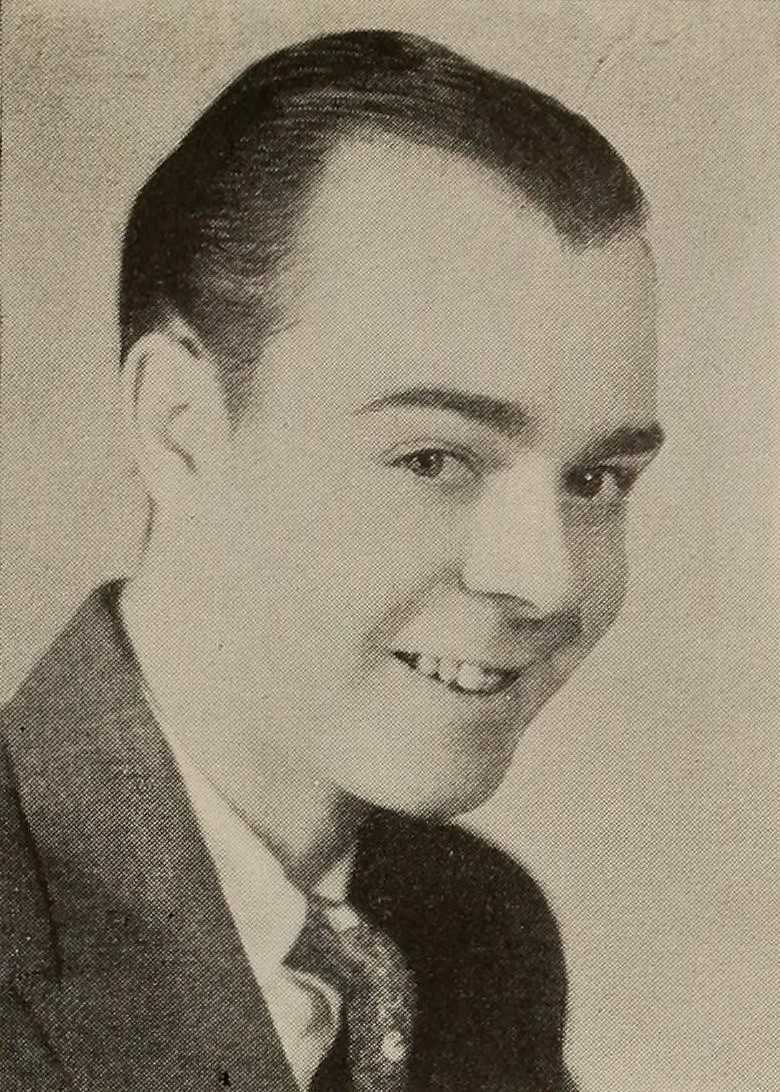
- Barris in 1932

Background information
- Born: November 25, 1905 New York City, New York, United States
- Died: December 13, 1962 (aged 57) Burbank, California, United States
- Genres: Jazz
- Occupation(s): Vocalist, Composer, Pianist
- Instrument(s): Piano, Vocal and Bass

Harry Barris (November 24, 1905 – December 13, 1962) was an American popular singer and songwriter. He was one of the earliest singers to use "scat singing" in recordings. Barris, one of Paul Whiteman's Rhythm Boys, along with Bing Crosby and Al Rinker, scatted on several songs, including "Mississippi Mud," which Barris wrote in 1927.

== Biography ==
Barris was born to Jewish parents in New York City. Gary Giddins described him as "small, wiry, and moon-faced with glittery eyes, and dark hair slicked back and parted in the middle." He was educated in Denver, Colorado. Barris became a professional pianist at the age of 14. He led a band which toured the Far East at the age of 17.

Barris married Hazelle Thompson in 1925 and they had a daughter, Hazelle Barris, in 1926.

The same year, Barris played the piano and occasionally sang in Paul Ash's orchestra. In the same year, Al Rinker and Bing Crosby became members of Paul Whiteman's Orchestra as a singing duo. However, appearing at the vast New York Paramount in February 1927, where there were no microphones, they could not be heard by the audience. They were promptly dropped from the bill. However, a band member who knew Barris suggested that they add him to make a trio and The Rhythm Boys were formed in April 1927.

In 1930, Barris divorced Hazelle Thompson. The Rhythm Boys left Paul Whiteman the same year and joined Gus Arnheim's Cocoanut Grove Orchestra. They made one more recording together, "Them There Eyes" (November 20, 1930), but the boys decided to quit in May 1931 and they went their separate ways. However, Barris changed his mind and returned to the Cocoanut Grove to complete his contract. Barris joined Arnheim's singing group The Three Ambassadors. Barris met Loyce Whiteman, who also sang with the Orchestra, and married her in 1931. They appear together in an episode of Rambling 'Round Radio Row. They had one daughter, Marti Barris, who also became a musician. They divorced in 1946.

Barris appeared in 57 films between 1931 and 1950, usually as a band member, pianist and/or singer. Seven of those films had Bing Crosby as the star. In 1932, Barris signed a contract to star in six shorts for Educational Pictures, similar to Bing Crosby's launch into films. The first of these shorts was That Rascal. In The Lost Weekend (1945), he is the nightclub pianist who humiliates Ray Milland by singing "Somebody Stole My Purse". An unusual change of pace for Barris was his comedy role in The Fleet's In (1942), as a runty sailor named Pee Wee who perpetrates malapropisms in a surprisingly deep voice.

During World War II, Barris, along with Joe E. Brown, went overseas to entertain troops.

Barris had a lifelong drinking problem. In a fall, he fractured his hip in March 1961. Despite a series of operations, his condition deteriorated. He died in Burbank, California, aged 57. His composition "Never Been So Lost" was published shortly before his death. Harry Barris was the uncle of television producer and game show host Chuck Barris.

== Compositions ==
1. "Hong Kong Dream Girl" (1924), with George E. Springer
2. "'Tain't Cold" (1925), with Jack Mills
3. "And She'll Do It For a Long, Long Time" (1926)
4. "Brown Sugar" (1926)
5. "I'm Out in Nowhere, Going to Go Somewhere" (1926)
6. "I Got a Sweet Lil' Girl" (1926)
7. "Jimmy-Da-Walk, Da Boss-A New York" (1926), with Howard Johnson and James Cavanaugh
8. "Why Does My Sweetie Love (Nobody But Me)" (1926), with Irving Mills
9. "Mississippi Mud" (1927), with James Cavanaugh
10. "That's Grandma" (1927), with Bing Crosby and James Cavanaugh
11. "Play It, Red" (1927)
12. "Sweet L'il" (1927)
13. "From Monday On" (1928), with Bing Crosby
14. "Wa-Da-Da (Ev'rybody's Doin' It Now)" (1928), with James Cavanaugh
15. "What Price Lyrics?" (1928), with Bing Crosby and Matty Malneck
16. "My Blue Print of Dreams" (1929), with Billy Moll
17. "So the Bluebirds and the Blackbirds Got Together" (1929), with Billy Moll
18. "That's What's Troubling Me" (1929), with Billy Moll
19. "Ev'rything's Agreed Upon" (1930), with Bing Crosby
20. "At Your Command" (1931), with Bing Crosby and Harry Tobias
21. "Chances Are" (1931), with Gus Arnheim and Ralph Freed
22. "It's the Darndest Thing" (1931)
23. "I Surrender Dear" (1931), with Gordon Clifford
24. "It Must Be True" (1931), with Gordon Clifford
25. "Lies" (1931), with George E. Springer
26. "What Good Would Be Tomorrow (Without You, Dear)" (1931), with Gus Arnheim and Ralph Freed
27. "What Is It?" (1931), with Harry Tobias
28. "Wrap Your Troubles in Dreams" (1931), with Ted Koehler and Billy Moll
29. "I Got the Ritz from the One I Love (I Got the Big Go-By)" (1932), with J. C. Lewis
30. "It Was So Beautiful" (1932), with Arthur Freed
31. "Music Has Charms" (1932), with J. C. Lewis
32. "We're Alone" (1932), with Arthur Freed
33. "It Will Be Too Bad for You" (1933)
34. "Let's Spend an Evening at Home (1933), with Ralph Freed
35. "I'm Satisfied" (1934), with Ralph Freed
36. "Little Dutch Mill" (1934), with Ralph Freed
37. "Lonesome China Boy" (1934), with Mort Greene
38. "Flirtation" (1935), with Mort Greene
39. "Thrilled" (1935), with Mort Greene
40. "Beyond Compare" (1936), with Mort Greene
41. "Naturally" (1938), with Joseph McCarthy
42. "Neighbors in the Sky" (1939)
43. "Never Been So Lost" (1962)

== Partial filmography ==
- King of Jazz (1930) - One of the Rhythm Boys
- Two Plus Fours (1930, Short) - Harry
- Confessions of a Co-Ed (1931) - Harry
- The Spirit of Notre Dame (1931) - Wasp
- That Rascal (1932, Short)
- The Cohens and Kellys in Hollywood (1932) - Pianist (uncredited)
- He's a Honey (1932, Short)
- Now's the Time (1932, Short)
- Rambling 'Round Radio Row (1932, Short) - Himself - Pianist / Singer
- Secret Sinners (1933) - Harry Barris - Pianist
- Hot Competition (1933)
- Hollywood Party (1934) - Singer of 'Feelin' High' (uncredited)
- Love Me Forever (1935) - Piano Player (uncredited)
- After the Dance (1935) - Tommy Tucker (scenes deleted)
- Every Night at Eight (1935) - Harry
- Show Boat (1936) - Jake - Pianist (uncredited)
- The Man I Marry (1936) - Piano Player
- Double or Nothing (1937) - Sing Orchestra Leader
- Something to Sing About (1937) - Pinky - Band Pianist
- Cowboy from Brooklyn (1938) - Louie
- Sing You Sinners (1938) - Moose - Orchestra Leader (uncredited)
- The Shining Hour (1938) - Bertie
- Trade Winds (1938) - Pianist (uncredited)
- Some Like It Hot (1939) - Harry, Piano Player
- Rhythm on the River (1940) - Bass Sax Player
- Blondie Goes Latin (1941) - Musician (uncredited)
- West Point Widow (1941) - Hot Dog Vendor (uncredited)
- Kiss the Boys Goodbye (1941) - Fisher's Publicity Agent
- Birth of the Blues (1941) - Suds
- Sing for Your Supper (1941) - Jimmy (uncredited)
- The Fleet's In (1942) - Pee Wee (uncredited)
- True to the Army (1942) - Piano Player (uncredited)
- Priorities on Parade (1942) - Harvey Erkimer
- Holiday Inn (1942) - Club Pierre Orchestra Leader (uncredited)
- Footlight Serenade (1942) - Composer (uncredited)
- Happy Go Lucky (1943) - Master of Ceremonies (uncredited)
- The Youngest Profession (1943) - Man Watching Mr. Hercules' Show (uncredited)
- Salute for Three (1943) - Second Sailor at Canteen Sailors' Table (uncredited)
- Dixie (1943) - Drummer / Minstrel (uncredited)
- Is Everybody Happy? (1943) - Bob
- Hey, Rookie (1944) - Pianist (uncredited)
- And the Angels Sing (1944) - Saxy
- San Diego, I Love You (1944) - Clarinetist (uncredited)
- My Gal Loves Music (1944) - Band Leader (uncredited)
- Here Come the Waves (1944) - Bandleader (uncredited)
- Rough, Tough and Ready (1945) - Eddie Coburn (uncredited)
- Penthouse Rhythm (1945) - Tim Noonan
- You Came Along (1945) Bandleader (uncredited)
- Steppin' in Society (1945) - Ivory
- Anchors Aweigh (1945) - Sailor Asking Joe to Get Autographs (uncredited)
- Week-End at the Waldorf (1945) - Anna's Boyfriend (uncredited)
- The Lost Weekend (1945) - Pianist at Harry & Joe's (uncredited)
- Young Widow (1946) - Officer's Club Pianist (uncredited)
- The Blue Dahlia (1946) - Bellhop (uncredited)
- Susie Steps Out (1946) - Ned
- You Were Meant for Me (1948) - Pianist - Member of the Band (uncredited)
- Three Little Words (1950) - Pianist at Party (uncredited)
- A Life of Her Own (1950) - Party Piano Player (uncredited) (final film role)

== Solo recordings ==
"It's the Darndest Thing"
Barris sings a solo with Gus Arnheim & His Orchestra

In 1926, Barris, billed as "Happy Harry Barris," made a solo record performing his own composition, "And She'll Do It For a Long, Long Time" (Cameo 1080), showcasing his talents as a pianist, vocalist, and songwriter. While this record survives, his few other solos recorded in 1926 have been lost. They include:

- "Could I, I Certainly Could" (Victor Matrix BVE-37174)
- "I'm Out in Nowhere, Going to Go Somewhere" (Victor Matrix BVE-37175)
- "I Got a Sweet Lil' Girl" (Victor Matrix BVE-37176)

During the 1930s, it was uncommon to hear Barris perform completely solo outside of films. A rare example is a Cocoanut Grove broadcast tape of "It's the Darndest Thing."

== Sources ==
- Donald Shepherd and Robert F. Slatzer, Bing Crosby: The Hollow Man (New York: St. Martin's Press, 1981), ISBN 978-0-523-42164-3
