= The Muppet Movie (soundtrack) =

The Muppet Movie: Original Soundtrack Recording
- Album artwork by Michael K. Frith

Soundtrack album by The Muppets
- Released: July 13, 1979
- Recorded: 1978
- Studios: A&M (Hollywood, California)
- Genre: Soundtrack
- Length: 32:36
- Labels: Atlantic; CBS
- Producer: Paul Williams

The Muppets chronology
The Muppet Show 2 (1978)	The Muppet Movie: Original Soundtrack Recording (1979)	The Great Muppet Caper: The Original Soundtrack (1981)

Singles from The Muppet Movie: Original Soundtrack Recording
- 1. "Rainbow Connection" Released: June 29, 1979; 2. "Movin' Right Along" Released: October 5, 1979

Professional ratings
Review scores
Source	Rating
Allmusic	4.5/5 stars
Artistdirect	4.5/5 stars

The Muppet Movie: Original Soundtrack Recording is the soundtrack album from the 1979 film, The Muppet Movie, featuring the songs and select score written by Paul Williams and Kenneth Ascher. Originally released on LP by Atlantic Records in North America and by CBS internationally, the album reached No. 32 on the Billboard 200, and was certified Gold by the Recording Industry Association of America. The soundtrack won the Grammy Award for Best Children's Album in 1980 and was also nominated for the Grammy Award for Best Score Soundtrack for Visual Media, the Golden Globe for Best Original Song, and two Academy Awards; Best Adaptation Score for the overall album and Best Original Song for "Rainbow Connection", which reached No. 25 on the Billboard Hot 100.

After its initial release, the soundtrack album had subsequent CD reissues by Jim Henson Records through BMG Kidz in 1993 and by Walt Disney Records on August 13, 2013. Disney's reissue was digitally remastered, featured liner notes by Williams, and marked the first time the soundtrack was available in print in over 20 years. The album was reissued on vinyl by Walt Disney Records in partnership with Iam8bit and The Muppets Studio on April 27, 2022.

== Track listing ==
No.	Title	Writer(s)	Artist(s)	Length
1.	"Rainbow Connection"	Paul Williams and Kenneth Ascher	Kermit the Frog (Jim Henson)	3:15
2.	"Movin' Right Along"	Williams and Ascher	Kermit the Frog and Fozzie Bear (Jim Henson and Frank Oz)	2:57
3.	"Never Before, Never Again"	Williams and Ascher	Miss Piggy (Frank Oz)	2:49
4.	"Never Before, Never Again" (Instrumental)	Williams		3:52
5.	"I Hope That Somethin' Better Comes Along"	Williams and Ascher	Kermit the Frog and Rowlf the Dog (Jim Henson)	3:58
6.	"Can You Picture That?"	Williams and Ascher	Dr. Teeth and the Electric Mayhem (Jim Henson, Frank Oz, Jerry Nelson, Richard Hunt and Dave Goelz)	2:33
7.	"I Hope That Somethin' Better Comes Along" (Instrumental)	Williams		2:31
8.	"I'm Going to Go Back There Someday"	Williams and Ascher	Gonzo (Dave Goelz)	2:55
9.	"America"	Katharine Lee Bates	Fozzie Bear (Frank Oz)	0:53
10.	"Animal...Come Back Animal"	Williams		1:30
11.	"Finale: The Magic Store"	Williams and Ascher	The Muppets (Jim Henson, Frank Oz, Jerry Nelson, Richard Hunt, Dave Goelz, Steve Whitmire and Kathryn Mullen)	5:17
Total length:				32:36

== Personnel ==
- Guitars: Art Munson, Ernie Corallo, Anthony Berg
- Keyboards: Kenny Ascher, David Garland, Michael Melvoin, Randy Kerber
- Drums: Gary Mallaber, James Gordon
- Percussion: Mark Stevens, Alan Estes
- Bass: Colin Cameron, Reinhold Press
- Saxophone: David Garland
- Harmonica: Tommy Morgan

== Charts and certifications ==
=== Charts ===
Chart (1979)	Peak position
U.S. Billboard Hot 100	25
U.S. Billboard 200	32
Australia (Kent Music Report)	31

=== Certifications ===
Region	Certification	Certified units/sales
United Kingdom (BPI)	Silver	60,000^{^}
United States (RIAA)	Gold	1,000,000 (Note: According to The Importance of Jim Henson, sales of the album reached to more than one million sales in 1980. For unknown reasons, the album was not certified Platinum by RIAA.)
^{^} Shipments figures based on certification alone.
