= The Muppets Go Hollywood =

US television program

- Genre: Family film Television special
- Created by: Henson Associates; Marble Arch Productions
- Based on: The Muppets by Jim Henson
- Written by: Jerry Juhl; Don Hinkley
- Directed by: Stan Harris
- Starring: Dick Van Dyke; Rita Moreno; Gary Owens; Muppet performers: Jim Henson; Frank Oz; Jerry Nelson; Richard Hunt; Dave Goelz; Steve Whitmire; Kathryn Mullen
- Theme music composer: Peter Matz
- Country of origin: United States
- Original language: English

Production
- Producer: Jim Henson
- Editor: Darryl Sutton
- Running time: 50 min.
- Production company: Marble Arch Productions

Original release
- Network: CBS
- Release: May 16, 1979

The Muppets Go Hollywood is a one-hour television special that promoted The Muppet Movie, the first theatrical film in The Muppets franchise. It first aired May 16, 1979 on CBS, six weeks before the American release of The Muppet Movie.

== Plot ==
Kermit the Frog throws a glamorous party at the Cocoanut Grove night club to celebrate the release of The Muppet Movie. Among the highlights of this special are:

- The Muppets and the celebrities arriving in the limousine.
- Sweetums, Timmy Monster, Doglion, Mean Mama, and the Mutations singing and dancing to "Hooray for Hollywood."
- Rita Moreno conducts a poolside interview with Miss Piggy with Scooter interrupting Miss Piggy by asking for some change for the pay phone so that he can call Frank Sinatra, Paul Newman, and Robert Redford on her behalf.
- Dick Van Dyke has a conversation with Sam the Eagle about the party. Despite Sam the Eagle showing his disapproval of the Hollywood ways, Dick then notices that the small book that Sam the Eagle has been carrying is an autograph book containing the names of the celebrities attending the party (ranging from Rudy Vallee to Gary Owens). Sam asks Dick if he's seen his favorite actor Walter Pidgeon when Dick tells him that Walter Pidgeon isn't at the party.
- Scooter calls Kermit the Frog into the kitchen where the Swedish Chef is doing his version of serving Swedish meatballs.
- The Peter Matz Orchestra plays "How High the Moon," featuring a solo by Zoot on saxophone. Rita Moreno is seen dancing with Floyd Pepper while asking how the Muppets are adjusting to Hollywood.
- Dick Van Dyke interviews Phyllis Diller while bringing up his encounter with Fozzie Bear in front of the Grauman's Chinese Theatre.
- Upon being introduced by Gary Owens, Miss Piggy arrives on a chaise carried by four bodybuilders, to the strains of "The Most Beautiful Girl in the World" and proceeds to sing "Baby Face" backed by the pigs.
- Johnny Mathis sings "Never Before, Never Again" while backed up by Rowlf the Dog on piano.
- Miss Piggy shows some footage from The Muppet Movie to Rita Moreno despite Kermit's objection.
- Kermit the Frog tells Dick Van Dyke that the Muppets are staying at the Bide-A-Wee Motor Court since it is the only area that gives the Muppets a good rate and they allow livestock. Kermit and Dick laugh at this until Miss Piggy karate chops both of them.
- Dr. Teeth and the Electric Mayhem sing "Can You Picture That?"
- The Muppets and the celebrities do a dance on the dance floor.
- Dick Van Dyke serenades Miss Piggy with "You Ought to Be in Pictures."
- While Animal tries to get at Rita Moreno, Dick Van Dyke interviews Jim Henson who mentions how lyricist Paul Williams and composer Kenny Ascher came up with "The Rainbow Connection." Footage of the pair performing the song cuts to a scene with Kermit the Frog singing "The Rainbow Connection."
- Dick Van Dyke asks Peter Falk on what the Cocoanut Grove was like back in the 1930s.
- Rita Moreno does a Carmen Miranda dance routine backed up by the Mutations while forming a conga line with guests and Muppets alike.
- After most of the guests have left in the conga line, Kermit and the other Muppets do a reprise of "Hooray for Hollywood."

After the musical number, Kermit the Frog and the rest of the Muppets clean up the Cocoanut Grove upon Kermit stating that they can save money by cleaning it up themselves.

== Notes ==
Later syndicated alongside The Muppet Show.

== Cast ==
- Kenny Ascher - Himself
- Dick Van Dyke - Himself
- Jim Henson - Himself
- Johnny Mathis - Himself
- Rita Moreno - Herself
- Gary Owens - Himself/Announcer
- Paul Williams - Himself

=== Muppet performers ===
- Jim Henson - Kermit the Frog, Rowlf the Dog, Dr. Teeth, Swedish Chef, and Waldorf
- Frank Oz - Miss Piggy, Fozzie Bear, Animal, and Sam the Eagle
- Jerry Nelson - Floyd Pepper
- Richard Hunt - Scooter, Janice, and Statler
- Dave Goelz - Gonzo the Great and Zoot

Additional Muppets performed by Steve Whitmire and Kathryn Mullen.

=== Special guest appearances ===
The following celebrities appeared at the party:

- Steve Allen
- Loni Anderson
- Burt Bacharach
- Anne Bancroft
- Candice Bergen
- Mel Brooks
- LeVar Burton
- Gary Busey
- Red Buttons
- Ruth Buzzi
- James Coburn
- Dom DeLuise
- Phyllis Diller
- Charles Durning
- Peter Falk
- John Forsythe
- Don Knotts
- Cheryl Ladd
- Liberace
- Robert Mandan
- Jayne Meadows
- Ethel Merman
- Donny Most
- Richard Mulligan
- Donna Pescow
- Vincent Price
- Carl Reiner
- Christopher Reeve
- Gary Sandy
- Robert Stack
- Jean Stapleton
- Maureen Stapleton
- Charlene Tilton
- Raquel Welch
