= Roots: John Lennon Sings the Great Rock & Roll Hits =

Studio album by John Lennon
- Released: January 1975
- Recorded: October 1973; 21–25 October 1974
- Studios: A&M, Hollywood; Record Plant, New York City
- Genre: Rock 'N' Roll
- Length: 45:05
- Label: Adam VIII
- Producers: John Lennon, Phil Spector

Roots: John Lennon Sings the Great Rock & Roll Hits is a rare mail-order album issued by Adam VIII consisting of rough mixes of John Lennon's Rock 'n' Roll album. It was available through television sale for three days in January 1975 before Lennon and Apple/EMI pulled it off the market. Lennon then rush-released his "official" version in February 1975.

== History ==
In 1969, Lennon composed the song "Come Together" for the Beatles' album Abbey Road. Inspired by the Chuck Berry tune "You Can't Catch Me", it bore too much of a melodic resemblance to the original—and Lennon took the third line of the second verse ("Here come old flat-top") for the new lyric. Publisher Morris Levy brought a lawsuit for infringement, and the case was due to be heard in a New York court in December 1973.

In the meanwhile, Lennon had split with Yoko Ono and was living in Los Angeles with his personal assistant, May Pang. To avoid returning to New York for the court case, Lennon agreed to record at least three songs from Levy's catalogue on his next album (after Mind Games) and Levy dropped the suit. Browsing Levy's music publishing catalogue, Lennon found so many of his old favourites that he decided to do a full album of cover songs, by Levy's artists and others.

Lennon initially teamed up with producer Phil Spector to record the album, but the sessions quickly fell into disarray with alcohol. Spector then disappeared with the session tapes and would not be heard from for several months. Spector made one cryptic call to Lennon, claiming to have the "John Dean tapes" from the recent Watergate scandal; Lennon deduced that Spector meant he had the album's master tapes. When an auto accident on 31 March 1974 allegedly left Spector in a coma, the project was put on indefinite hold.

In May 1974, Lennon returned to New York with Pang and began writing and recording a new album of original material, Walls and Bridges. Just as these sessions began, Al Coury, A&R and vice-president of promotion of Capitol Records, retrieved the Spector tapes for $90,000. Not wanting to break stride, Lennon shelved the tapes and completed work on Walls and Bridges.

With Walls and Bridges coming out first, Lennon had reneged on his deal with Levy. To add insult to injury, Lennon included a snippet of the Levy-published "Ya Ya" on Walls and Bridges (featuring son Julian on drums) with the snide remark "O.K, we'll do sitting in the la la, that'll get rid of that!" in the song's intro. This infuriated Levy who threatened to refile his lawsuit. Lennon explained to Levy what had happened and assured him that the covers album was indeed in the works. Lennon then recalled the session musicians from Walls and Bridges to complete the oldies tracks. Levy offered the use of his farm in upstate New York for the band to rehearse.

In a show of good faith, Lennon gave Levy a rough copy of the tracks to review. Levy offered to directly market the album via television mail order, through his own Adam VIII record label, bypassing Capitol and EMI, giving both Lennon and Levy a larger share of the album's profits. Lennon gave his assent, and even considered appearing in a TV commercial to promote the album, but knew he would need the approval of EMI, Capitol and Apple Corps for the deal.

With so much money and time invested in the sessions, neither Capitol, EMI nor Apple wanted to give it up, insisting Lennon release it according to his recording contract and turn Levy's proposal down. Feeling betrayed, Levy pressed an album from the rough tape Lennon had provided, then proceeded to sue Lennon, EMI and Capitol for $42 million for breach of contract. Lennon and Capitol/EMI countersued.

Lennon finished work on his version of the album, omitting two songs from the final selection. In February 1975, Capitol Records rush-released the official Rock 'n' Roll, and Lennon also reconciled with Yoko Ono.

In February 1976, the case was heard in New York District Court. Lennon (sporting a crewcut) and Ono attended the proceedings, which were at times amusing. When asked by Levy's attorney if he had cut his hair as to not resemble the cover photo of Roots, Lennon replied, "Rubbish! I cut it every 18 months." Later on in the trial, the same lawyer asked Lennon to autograph a copy of his Mind Games album "for my daughter, I can't account for her taste."

By June, Lennon and Capitol/EMI had prevailed. Though Levy was awarded a token payment for the infringement on "You Can't Catch Me", he had to pay EMI $109,700 in lost revenue and $42,000 to Lennon for "damages to his reputation"—due to the poor sound quality (besides the rough mixes, some of the songs were sped up to fit in more tracks) and the "horrible album cover".

Production and distribution of Roots was halted and the albums were ordered destroyed. With only 3,000 copies of Roots reportedly pressed, original copies are rare and sought-after collector's items. Copies in mint condition have sold for US$2,000. Lennon was disappointed at how poorly the mail order setup had actually worked, having ordered his own copy as a follow-up and had to wait almost a month to receive it.

== Track listing ==
All tracks produced by John Lennon, except † by Phil Spector.

Side one

1. "Be-Bop-A-Lula" (Tex Davis, Gene Vincent) – 2:39
2. "Ain't That a Shame" (Fats Domino, Dave Bartholomew) – 2:38
  - Contains a longer fadeout than the Rock 'n' Roll version
3. "Stand by Me" (Jerry Leiber, Mike Stoller, Ben E. King) – 3:26
  - Without the strings added to the official release
4. "Sweet Little Sixteen" † (Chuck Berry) – 3:01
5. "Medley: Rip It Up/Ready Teddy" (Robert 'Bumps' Blackwell, John Marascalco) – 1:33
6. "Angel Baby" † (Rosie Hamlin) – 3:42
  - Not officially released until the 1986 compilation Menlove Ave.
7. "Do You Wanna Dance?" (Bobby Freeman) – 3:15
8. "You Can't Catch Me" † (Chuck Berry) – 4:03
  - The Rock 'n' Roll version was stretched to 4:51 by repeating the first verse

Side two

1. "Bony Moronie" † (Larry Williams) – 3:47
2. "Peggy Sue" (Jerry Allison, Norman Petty, Buddy Holly) – 2:06
3. "Medley: Bring It On Home to Me/Send Me Some Lovin'" (Sam Cooke)/ (John Marascalco, Leo Price) – 3:41
4. "Slippin' and Slidin'" (Eddie Bocage, Al Collins, Richard Wayne Penniman, James H. Smith) – 2:20
  - Contains a longer fadeout than the Rock 'n' Roll version
5. "Be My Baby" † (Phil Spector/Ellie Greenwich/Jeff Barry) – 4:32
  - Not officially released until the 1998 John Lennon Anthology
6. "Ya Ya" (Lee Dorsey, Clarence Lewis, Morgan Robinson) – 2:17
7. "Just Because" † (Lloyd Price) – 4:25

== Personnel ==
- John Lennon: Guitars, vocals
- Jesse Ed Davis: Guitar
- Steve Cropper: Guitar
- Jim Calvert: Guitar
- Eddie Mottau: Acoustic guitar
- José Feliciano: Acoustic guitar
- Michael Hazelwood: Acoustic Guitar
- Klaus Voormann: Bass guitar, answer vocal on "Bring It On Home to Me"
- Leon Russell: Keyboards
- Ken Ascher: Keyboards
- Jim Keltner: Drums
- Hal Blaine: Drums
- Gary Mallaber: Drums
- Arthur Jenkins: Percussion
- Nino Tempo: Saxophone
- Jeff Barry: Horn
- Barry Mann: Horn
- Bobby Keys: Horn
- Peter Jameson: Horn
- Joseph Temperley: Horn
- Dennis Morouse: Horn
- Frank Vicari: Horn
