= Big Up =

Big Up or Big Ups may refer to:

- Big Up (group), a Black gay men's group that merged with GMFA
- Big Up (album), a 1987 album by Aswad
- "Big Up" (song), a song by Shaggy
- "Big Up", a 2005 song by Avalon
- Big Ups (band), American musical band
- Big UP Productions, American film production company
- The Big Up Festival, a festival of music, art and culture in Ghent, New York
