= Rock 'n' Roll (John Lennon album) =

Studio album by John Lennon
- Released: 17 February 1975
- Recorded: October 1973; 21–25 October 1974
- Studios: A&M, Hollywood; Record Plant, New York City
- Genre: Rock 'n' roll
- Length: 39:33
- Label: Apple
- Producers: John Lennon, Phil Spector

John Lennon chronology
Walls and Bridges (1974)	Rock 'n' Roll (1975)	Shaved Fish (1975)

Singles from Rock 'n' Roll
- 1. "Stand by Me" Released: 10 March 1975; 2. "Ya Ya" Released: 1975 (Germany only)

Rock 'n' Roll is the fifth and final solo album by the English musician John Lennon. Released in February 1975, it is a covers album of rock and roll songs from the late 1950s and early 1960s.

Recording the album was troubled and spanned an entire year: Phil Spector produced sessions in October 1973 at A&M Studios, and Lennon produced sessions in October 1974 at the Record Plant. Lennon was being sued by Morris Levy over copyright infringement over one line in his Beatles song "Come Together". As part of an agreement, Lennon had to include three Levy-owned songs on Rock 'n' Roll. Spector disappeared with the session recordings and was subsequently involved in a motor accident, leaving the album's tracks unrecoverable until the beginning of the Walls and Bridges sessions. With Walls and Bridges coming out first, featuring one Levy-owned song, Levy sued Lennon expecting to see Lennon's Rock 'n' Roll album.

The album reached number 6 in both the United Kingdom and the United States, later being certified Gold in both countries. It was supported by the single "Stand by Me", which peaked at number 20 in the US, and 30 in the UK. The cover photo was taken by Jürgen Vollmer during the Beatles' stay in Hamburg.

== Background ==
Lennon wrote the song "Come Together" for the Beatles' 1969 album Abbey Road. Inspired by the Chuck Berry tune "You Can't Catch Me", it bore a melodic resemblance to the original—and Lennon took the third line of the second verse ("Here come [old] flat-top") for the new lyric. Publisher Morris Levy, who held "You Can't Catch Me"'s copyright, brought a lawsuit for infringement, and the case was due to be heard in a New York court in December 1973. It was later settled out of court, with the agreement that, according to an announcement by Levy, Lennon had to "record three songs by Big Seven publishers on his next album. The songs [he] intends to record at this time are "You Can't Catch Me", "Angel Baby" and "Ya Ya"." Lennon had the right to change the last two songs to any other songs that were published by Big Seven. The settlement also specified that he was to offer licensing rights to any three of seven specified non-Beatle songs owned by Apple Music.

In the meantime, Lennon had separated from Yoko Ono and was living in Los Angeles with his personal assistant, May Pang. Nostalgia was a popular trend on film following response to the George Lucas film American Graffiti, and television was readying the series Happy Days (Lennon, Pang and John's son Julian had even visited the set). Lennon, rather than writing his own songs, and partly inspired by his arrangement to include at least three songs from Levy's publishing company catalogue, Big Seven Music, decided to record an album of oldies as his next release, following Mind Games.

== Recording ==
I remember the old rock songs better than I remember my own songs. If I sat down in a room and just started playing, if I had a guitar now and we were just hanging out singing, I would sing all the early and mid ’50s stuff — Buddy Holly and all. I remember those. I don’t remember the chords or the lyrics or anything of the Beatles’ stuff. So my repertoire is that.

— John Lennon, 1980

Lennon initially teamed up with producer Phil Spector to record the album, letting Spector have full control. Spector chose some of the songs, and booked the studio and the musicians. When news got around that Lennon was in Hollywood making a record, many musicians working in the city wanted to be involved. In mid-October 1973, sessions were booked at A&M Studios, with many of them having over 30 musicians, but the sessions quickly fell into disarray—fueled by alcohol. Spector once showed up dressed in a surgeon's outfit and shot a gun in the ceiling of the studio to demonstrate that he would not put up with arguments, hurting Lennon's ears. On another occasion, a bottle of whiskey had spilled on the A&M Studio's mixing console causing future sessions to be banned from the facility. Unknown to Lennon, each night Spector would remove the master tapes from the studio, and move them to his house.

Spector then disappeared with the session tapes and would not be heard from for several months. the producer made one cryptic call to Lennon, claiming to have the "John Dean tapes" from the recent Watergate scandal; Lennon deduced that he meant he had the album's master tapes. When a car accident on 31 March 1974 left Spector in a coma, the project was put on indefinite hold. In mid-1974, Lennon returned to New York with May Pang and began writing and recording a new album of original material, Walls and Bridges. Shortly before these sessions began, Al Coury, then-head of A&R/promotion for Capitol Records, retrieved the Spector tapes. Not wanting to break stride, Lennon shelved the tapes and completed work on Walls and Bridges.

Lennon had reneged on his deal with Levy by releasing Walls and Bridges first. Thereafter, Levy threatened to refile his lawsuit, but Lennon explained to him what had happened and assured him that the covers album was indeed in the works. Levy gave Lennon use of his farm in upstate New York to rehearse material. Lennon then recalled the session musicians from Walls and Bridges to complete the oldies tracks. Several tracks never made it past the rehearsal stage: "C'mon Everybody", "Thirty Days", "That'll Be the Day"—the band also played a few impromptu jams.

On 21 October, Lennon went into Record Plant East and finished the oldies tracks in a few days. He wanted the musicians to stay close to the original arrangements of the songs, apart from "Do You Want to Dance". Mixing and editing lasted until mid-November. To assure him progress was being made, Lennon gave Levy a rough tape of the sessions to review. Levy took the tapes and pressed his own version of the album called Roots: John Lennon Sings the Great Rock & Roll Hits on his record label Adam VIII, in January 1975. He then proceeded to sue Lennon, EMI, and Capitol for $42 million for breach of contract. Capitol/EMI quickly sought an injunction. After two trials, in which Lennon had to convince the court of the difference between a rough version and a final take, Levy won $6,795 in damages, and Lennon won $144,700, in February 1976. The album was originally scheduled for release in April 1975; however, in February 1975, Capitol Records rush-released the official Rock 'n' Roll as a Capitol "budget" album (with the prefix code SK—one dollar cheaper than the usual releases) to counteract sales of the Levy album.

== Cover art ==
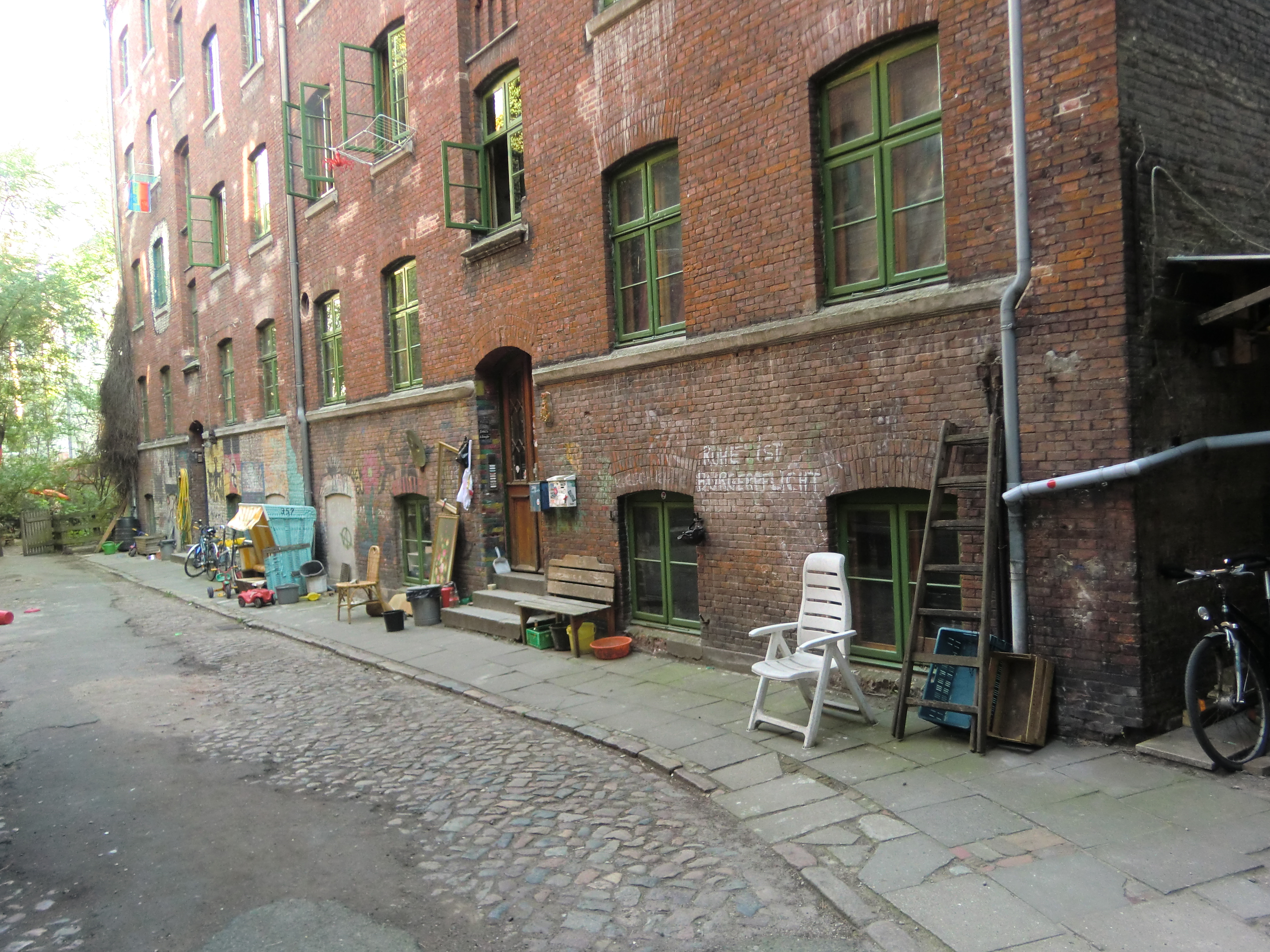
Modern streetview of where the album cover was taken

Lennon planned to use some of his childhood drawings for the cover of his oldies album, and production had already begun when Lennon switched gears, so the artwork was used instead for Walls and Bridges. In September 1974, May Pang attended the first Beatlefest convention at his behest and met Jürgen Vollmer, an old friend of the Beatles from Hamburg, Germany, who had photographed the band during their Hamburg days. He was selling some striking portraits, and Pang immediately phoned Lennon to tell him of her find. Reuniting with Vollmer in New York, Lennon chose one of his photos for the album's cover. The photo depicts Lennon in a doorway with three blurry figures walking past him in the foreground: George Harrison, Stuart Sutcliffe, and Paul McCartney. It was taken at 22 Wohlwillstraße in Hamburg.

The album's working title had been Oldies But Mouldies; no official title had been chosen until Lennon saw the neon sign prepared as cover art by John Uomoto, with Lennon's name and the words ROCK 'N' ROLL beneath. This struck Lennon in a positive way, and it became the album title.

== Reception and aftermath ==
Professional ratings
Review scores
Source	Rating
AllMusic	4/5 stars
And It Don't Stop (Note: 2004 CD reissue)	A
Christgau's Record Guide	B−
Mojo	3/5 stars
The Music Box	3/5 stars
MusicHound	4/5
Paste	2/5 stars
Pitchfork Media	7.1/10
The Rolling Stone Album Guide	3.5/5 stars
Uncut	2/5 stars

The album was released on 17 February 1975 in the US, and a few days later in the UK, on 21 February 1975. It reached number 6 in both the United Kingdom and the United States. On 10 March and 18 April 1975, in the US and UK respectively, "Stand by Me" was released as a single, backed with "Move Over Ms. L", a song that was meant to appear on Walls and Bridges but was cut from the final line-up. "Stand by Me" peaked at number 20 in the US and number 30 in the UK. Lennon promoted the song by appearing on the BBC TV show Old Grey Whistle Test, which also featured an interview by Bob Harris. The show had Lennon singing live over the backing tracks of "Stand by Me" and "Slippin' and Slidin'". Lennon also appeared on Salute to Sir Lew – The Master Showman singing live again over backing tracks, this time for three songs: "Stand by Me", "Slippin' and Slidin'" and "Imagine". A second single, "Slippin N Slidin"/"Ain't That a Shame", was announced, and promotional copies pressed, but it was not released. "Ya Ya", backed with "Be-Bop-A-Lula", was released as a single only in Germany, peaking at number 47 on the Media Control Charts.

Although some critics derided the album as "a step backward", The Rolling Stone Album Guide wrote that "John lends dignity to these classics; his singing is tender, convincing, and fond". AllMusic described the album "as a peak in [Lennon's] post-Imagine catalog: an album that catches him with nothing to prove and no need to try". In 1975, Lennon said of Rock 'n' Roll: "It started in '73 with Phil and fell apart. I ended up as part of mad, drunk scenes in Los Angeles and I finally finished it off on my own. And there was still problems with it up to the minute it came out. I can't begin to say, it's just barmy, there's a jinx on that album."

Not long after the album appeared, Lennon reconciled with Yoko Ono, and she soon became pregnant. Determined not to lose another baby after three consecutive miscarriages, Lennon decided to halt his musical career for his family. Sean Lennon was born that October (on his father's 35th birthday); following the release of the compilation Shaved Fish, Lennon would not return with a new release until 1980.

In later decades, Rock 'n' Roll has appeared in lists ranking the best cover albums, including by The Independent, NME and Radio X.

== Reissues ==
"Stand by Me" was reissued in the US, backed with "Woman Is the Nigger of the World", on 4 April 1977. Rock 'n' Roll re-charted in the UK on 17 January 1981, at number 64. In the US, it was reissued in October 1980, also at budget price, and it was briefly reissued in the UK by the budget label Music for Pleasure with an alternative cover on 25 November 1981. After Lennon's death, the album, along with seven other Lennon albums, was reissued by EMI as part of a box set, which was released in the UK on 15 June 1981. In 1981, Belgium and France issued the album, along with the Beatles' Rock 'n' Roll Music, as part of a box set.

The album was first issued on CD on 26 May 1987. In 1988, it was reissued in Australia with an alternative cover and under the title Rip It Up. In 2004, Yoko Ono supervised the remixing of Rock 'n' Roll for its reissue, including four bonus tracks from the ill-fated Spector sessions. These leftovers from the sessions had already appeared, as part of 1986's Menlove Ave. (Note: The songs are: "Angel Baby", "Since My Baby Left Me", "To Know Her Is to Love Her" and "Here We Go Again".) (a collection of outtakes) or the John Lennon Anthology box set. (The Lennon/Spector co-composition "Here We Go Again" was not included on the remastered Rock 'n' Roll, and can be found on Menlove Ave. as well as on the soundtrack album for The U.S. vs. John Lennon and the 2010 Gimme Some Truth 4-CD set, on the 4th CD entitled "Roots" featuring the Rock 'n' Roll tracks). In 2010, the original album mixes were remastered; the album was available separately as part of the John Lennon Signature Box.

== Track listing ==
All tracks produced and arranged by John Lennon, except * produced by Phil Spector, and arranged by Spector and Lennon.

Side one
No.	Title	Writer(s)	Length
1.	"Be-Bop-a-Lula"	Tex Davis, Gene Vincent	2:39
2.	"Stand By Me"	Jerry Leiber and Mike Stoller, Ben E. King	3:26
3.	"Medley: Rip It Up/Ready Teddy"	Robert Blackwell, John Marascalco	1:33
4.	"You Can't Catch Me" (*)	Chuck Berry	4:51
5.	"Ain't That a Shame"	Fats Domino, Dave Bartholomew	2:38
6.	"Do You Want to Dance"	Bobby Freeman	2:53
7.	"Sweet Little Sixteen" (*)	Berry	3:01
Total length:			21:01

Side two
No.	Title	Writer(s)	Length
1.	"Slippin' and Slidin'"	Eddie Bocage, Al Collins, Richard Wayne Penniman, James H. Smith	2:16
2.	"Peggy Sue"	Jerry Allison, Norman Petty	2:06
3.	"Medley: Bring It On Home to Me/Send Me Some Lovin'"	Sam Cooke, John Marascalco, Leo Price	3:41
4.	"Bony Moronie" (*)	Larry Williams	3:47
5.	"Ya Ya"	Lee Dorsey, Clarence Lewis, Bobby Robinson, Morris Levy	2:17
6.	"Just Because" (*)	Lloyd Price	4:25
Total length:			18:32

2004 reissue bonus tracks

No.	Title	Writer(s)	Length
14.	"Angel Baby" (*)	Rosie Hamlin	3:44
15.	"To Know Her Is to Love Her" (*)	Phil Spector	4:31
16.	"Since My Baby Left Me" (*)	Arthur Crudup	4:40
17.	"Just Because (Reprise) (Note: On "Just Because (Reprise)," Lennon adds "It's all down to Goodnight Vienna, I'd like to say hi to Ringo, Paul and, George ... how are you? (and) Everybody back home, in England ... what's cookin'?")" (*)	Price	1:25

== Personnel ==
- John Lennon – lead vocals, guitar
- Jim Calvert – guitar
- Larry Carlton – guitar
- Steve Cropper – guitar
- Jesse Ed Davis – guitar
- Louis Shelton – guitar
- José Feliciano – acoustic guitar
- Michael Hazlewood – acoustic guitar
- Eddie Mottau – acoustic guitar
- Bob Glaub – bass guitar
- Tom Hansley – bass guitar
- Reed Kailing – bass guitar on "Do You Want To Dance"
- Ray Neapolitan – bass guitar
- Klaus Voormann – bass guitar, harmony/answer vocal on "Bring It On Home to Me"
- Leon Russell – keyboards
- Ken Ascher – keyboards
- Michael Lang – keyboards
- Hal Blaine – drums
- Frank Capp – drums
- Jim Gordon – drums
- Jim Keltner – drums
- Gary Mallaber – drums
- Gary Coleman – percussion
- Alan Estes – percussion
- Steve Forman – percussion
- Terry Gibbs – percussion
- Arthur Jenkins – percussion
- Nino Tempo – saxophone
- Jeff Barry – horn
- Barry Mann – horn
- Bobby Keys – horn
- Peter Jameson – horn
- Joseph Temperley – horn
- Dennis Morouse – horn
- Frank Vicari – horn

== Charts ==
=== Weekly charts ===
Chart (1975)	Position
Australian Kent Music Report Chart	5
Canadian RPM Albums Chart	5
Finnish Albums Chart	7
German Media Control Albums Chart	37
Italian Albums (Musica e dischi)	12
Japanese Oricon LP Chart	12
New Zealand Albums Chart	11
Norwegian VG-lista Albums Chart	9
Swedish Albums Chart	20
UK Albums Chart	6
US Billboard 200	6

=== Weekly charts (reissue) ===
Chart (1981)	Position
UK Albums Chart	64

=== Year-end charts ===
Chart (1975)	Position
Australian Albums Chart	40
Canadian Albums Chart	37
UK Albums Chart	48

=== Certifications ===
Region	Certification	Certified units/sales
United Kingdom (BPI)	Gold	100,000^{^}
United States (RIAA)	Gold	500,000^{^}
^{^} Shipments figures based on certification alone.

== Bibliography ==
- Blaney, John (2005). John Lennon: Listen to This Book (illustrated ed.). [sine loco]: Paper Jukebox. ISBN 978-0-9544528-1-0.
- Edmondson, Jacqueline (2010). John Lennon: A Biography (illustrated ed.). Santa Barbara, California: Greenwood. ISBN 978-0-313-37938-3.
- Ingham, Chris (2003). The Rough Guide to The Beatles (1st ed.). London, England: Rough Guides. ISBN 978-1-84353-140-1.
- Norman, Philip (2008). John Lennon: The Life. New York City, New York: HarperCollins. ISBN 978-0-06-075401-3.
- Sheff, David (2020) [1981]. Golson, G. Barry (ed.). All We Are Saying: The Last Major Interview with John Lennon and Yoko Ono (40th anniversary ed.). London, England: Pan Books. ISBN 978-1-5290-4841-4.
