= Adam VIII =

Defunct American record label

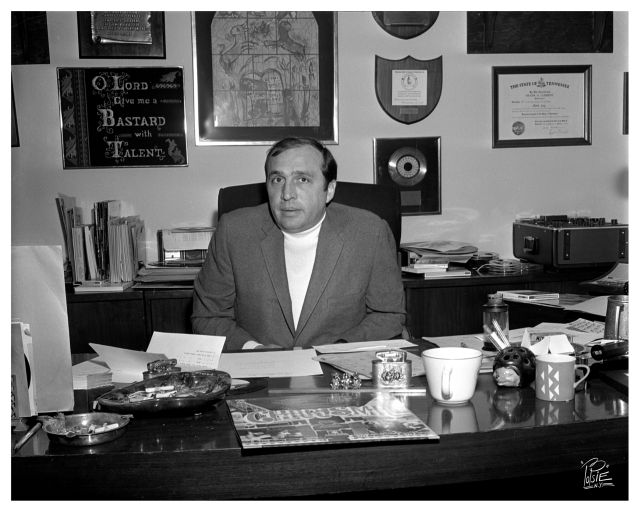
Morris Levy, at the Roulette office, December 1969

Adam VIII Limited was a record label founded by music publisher Morris Levy, and named after his son Adam. It operated in the late 1960s through the early 1980s.

Adam VIII specialised in mail order issues and reissues of popular music, including works originally appearing on Roulette Records, also owned by Morris Levy. By 1976, they had sold up to a million units of disco hits and rock hits featuring Chubby Checker. They also marketed and sold albums recorded by Billie Holiday.

== Lawsuit ==
In 1975 they released Roots, a version of John Lennon's album Rock 'n' Roll. Lennon originally undertook the project as a way to settle a copyright infringement lawsuit, over his song "Come Together", which had borrowed noticeably from Chuck Berry's "You Can't Catch Me" (published by Levy). As part of the settlement, Lennon agreed to record three songs that were owned by Levy's publishing house, Big Seven Music. A planned deal to market the album through Adam VIII turned sour, and Levy released an album pressed from the rough-mix tape Lennon had given him, weeks before the album was finished, then sued Lennon, Capitol Records (Lennon's American label), and EMI for breach of contract for $7 million. Levy claimed that Lennon had agreed to allow the album to be released on Levy's mail-order label, as further settlement to the "You Can't Catch Me" lawsuit. The latter three countersued and won, receiving $144,700 for lost royalties and damaged reputation over the album, and an injunction was ordered for Levy to suspend the sales of the album. Levy later opined that "I lost because the judge fell in love with John Lennon, and Yoko knitted all day long, as a pregnant lady in the first row of the court". After Adam VIII suspended sales of the album, naturally, the copies that had already been purchased became a collector's item. According to court documents, exactly 1,270 copies of Roots were sold.

== See also ==
- List of record labels
