= Rainbow Connection =

1979 song originally appearing in the Muppet Movie

- International single cover

Single by Jim Henson as Kermit the Frog

from the album The Muppet Movie: Original Soundtrack Recording
- B-side: "I Hope That Somethin' Better Comes Along"
- Released: June 1979
- Recorded: 1978
- Studio: A&M (Hollywood, California)
- Genre: Chamber pop; bluegrass; folk
- Length: 3:15
- Label: Atlantic (US/Canada); CBS (international)
- Songwriters: Paul Williams; Kenneth Ascher
- Producers: Paul Williams; Jim Henson

"Rainbow Connection" is a song from the 1979 film The Muppet Movie, with music and lyrics written by Paul Williams and Kenneth Ascher. The song was performed by Jim Henson as Kermit the Frog during the film's opening number, showing Kermit sitting alone on a log in the swamp, accompanying himself on his banjo. The song is an integral part of Kermit's character's arc, since it establishes his dream of "making millions of people happy", which motivates his journey to Hollywood throughout the film.

"Rainbow Connection" reached No. 25 on the Billboard Hot 100 in November 1979, with the song remaining in the Top 40 for seven weeks in total. Williams and Ascher received an Academy Award nomination for Best Original Song at the 52nd Academy Awards.

In 2020, "Rainbow Connection" was deemed "culturally, historically, or aesthetically significant" by the Library of Congress and selected for preservation in the National Recording Registry.

== Production ==
Williams and Ascher, who had previously collaborated on several songs for the 1976 film A Star Is Born, were tasked with writing the songs for The Muppet Movie. For the song that became "Rainbow Connection", Jim Henson told them that the opening scene should feature Kermit the Frog by himself, singing and playing the banjo. Williams and Ascher wrote most of the song fairly quickly at Williams's house but got stuck trying to think of appropriate words for the part in the chorus that eventually became the phrase "the rainbow connection"; they were looking for a way to tie in the chorus to the song's theme of rainbows. As they sat down for dinner with Williams's then-wife, Kate Clinton, they explained to her their predicament of looking for a phrase that would provide "a rainbow connection", then realized, in the course of explaining the problem to her, that the phrase "the rainbow connection" would itself be a good fit. Williams and Ascher used "When You Wish Upon a Star" from Pinocchio as inspiration for the song.

Williams has said that his favorite lyrics in the song are in the second verse, which begins with "Who said that every wish / Would be heard and answered / When wished on the morning star?", because they imply that "there's power in your thoughts". He also noted that the lyrical phrasing was written weirdly with Kermit's speech patterns in mind.

== Critical reception and awards ==
Allmusic described "Rainbow Connection" as an "unlikely radio hit ... which Kermit the Frog sings with all the dreamy wistfulness of a short, green Judy Garland" and went on to add that "'Rainbow Connection' serves the same purpose in The Muppet Movie that 'Over the Rainbow' served in The Wizard of Oz, with nearly equal effectiveness: an opening establishment of the characters' driving urge for something more in life." Others have similarly referred to "Rainbow Connection" as the film's "I Want" song.

Ascher and Williams received Oscar nominations at the 52nd Academy Awards for the score of The Muppet Movie and for "Rainbow Connection", which was nominated for Best Original Song. The score lost to Bob Fosse's All That Jazz. The song lost to "It Goes Like It Goes" from Norma Rae, a win that some critics denounced.

== Legacy and other Muppet renditions ==
The song's name has been used by a number of charitable organizations wishing to evoke its message, including a children's charity similar to the Make-A-Wish Foundation, a summer camp for seriously ill children, and a horseriding camp for people with disabilities. The name's influence can also be seen from business names to artificial Christmas tree products.

The American Film Institute named "Rainbow Connection" the 74th greatest movie song of all time in AFI's 100 Years...100 Songs.

Kermit the Frog reprised the song on The Muppet Show in 1981 as a duet with Debbie Harry when she was a guest star. Jeff Moss and Ralph Burns also quoted the song's intro as the intro to the instrumental, "carriage ride" rendition of "Together Again" that segued into the Muppet Babies song sequence, "I'm Gonna Always Love You" in The Muppets Take Manhattan (1984). The song is also reprised by a large group of Muppets as the closing number in the 1985 special The Muppets: A Celebration of 30 Years.

Kermit reprises the song in the 2011 film The Muppets, this time as a duet with Miss Piggy that leads into the entire Muppet group singing together. A shorter version of the song performed by tribute band "The Moopets", along with Fozzie Bear, is also used in the film. The iTunes release of The Muppets soundtrack included a new version of the song as an exclusive bonus track, recorded by Steve Whitmire as Kermit. The song was also reprised in the TV series The Muppets, in the 2015 episode "Pig's in a Blackout".

In 1996 in Whanganui, New Zealand, a 21-year-old man burst into the radio station Star FM and took the manager hostage, demanding that Kermit the Frog's rendition of the song be played.

On September 24, 2011, the town of Leland, Mississippi, changed the name of a local bridge to "The Rainbow Connection" in honor of Henson on what would have been his 75th birthday. Henson had lived in Leland and played near the bridge as a child.

On January 7, 2019, Kermit and Jimmy Fallon performed "Rainbow Connection" on The Tonight Show Starring Jimmy Fallon.

On April 25, 2020, Disney released a new performance of the song (performed by Matt Vogel as Kermit the Frog) on social media to lift spirits during the COVID-19 pandemic.

On January 14, 2022, during Epcot's Festival of the Arts, "Rainbow Connection" was featured in a lighting display on Spaceship Earth.

== Charts ==
Weekly chart performance for "Rainbow Connection"
Chart (1979–1980)	Peak position
Australia (Kent Music Report)	14
US Billboard Hot 100	25
US Billboard Adult Contemporary	18

=== Year-end charts ===
Year-end chart performance for "Rainbow Connection"
Chart (1980)	Position
Australia (Kent Music Report)	98

== Certifications ==
Region	Certification	Certified units/sales
United States (RIAA)	Gold	500,000^{‡}
^{‡} Sales+streaming figures based on certification alone.

== Carpenters version ==
"The Rainbow Connection"

Single by Carpenters

from the album As Time Goes By
- B-side: "Leave Yesterday Behind"
- Released: July 25, 2001
- Recorded: 1981
- Length: 4:34
- Label: A&M
- Songwriters: Ken Ascher; Paul Williams
- Producer: Richard Carpenter

Carpenters singles chronology
"Tryin' to Get the Feeling Again" (1994)	"The Rainbow Connection" (2001)

=== Tracklist ===
- CD single UICY-5006
1. "The Rainbow Connection"
2. "Leave Yesterday Behind"
3. "Medley (Superstar/Rainy Days and Mondays)"
- JP CD promo (2001) SIC-1039
1. "The Rainbow Connection"
2. "Leave Yesterday Behind"
