= Morris Levy =

American music executive (1927–1990)

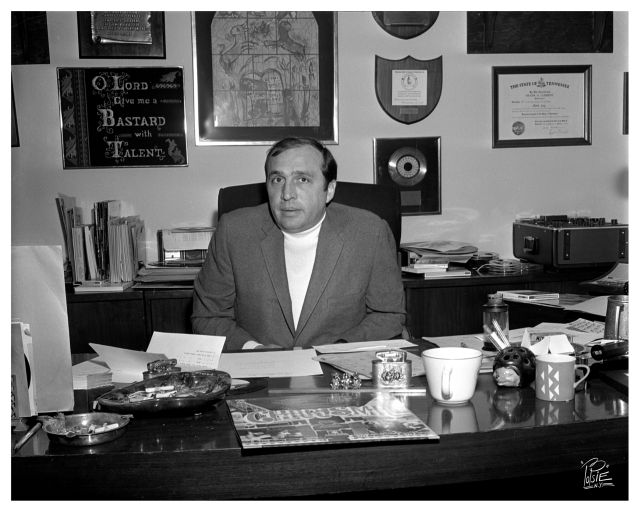
- Levy in 1969
- Born: Moishe Levy; August 27, 1927; Harlem, New York City, US
- Died: May 21, 1990 (aged 62); Ghent, New York
- Occupation: Music business executive
- Organization(s): Roulette Records; Birdland
- Spouses: Patricia Caraeff (m. 1950; div. 1954) Ruth Rubin (m. 1954; div. 1958) Cynthia Brooks (m. 1958, divorced) Jean Glassell (m. 1962, divorced) Karen White (m. 1979)
- Children: 3

Morris Levy (born Moishe Levy; August 27, 1927 – May 21, 1990) was an American entrepreneur in the fields of jazz clubs, music publishing, and the independent record industry. Levy was cofounder and owner of Roulette Records, founding partner of the Birdland jazz club and the Roulette Room. He was a subject of investigations into organized crime and the music industry, and was convicted of extortion shortly before his death.

At the peak of his business career, Levy owned more than 90 companies employing 900 people, including record-pressing plants, tape-duplicating plants, a distribution company, a New England chain of 81 record stores (Strawberries), and many record labels.

Levy, who went by "Moishe" or "Mo" within the record industry, was described by Billboard magazine as "one of the record industry's most controversial and flamboyant players" and by Variety as "The Octopus", for his far-reaching control, disproportionate to the size of his companies, in every area of the record business. AllMusic described him as "a notorious crook who swindled artists out of their owed royalties". Corrupting the Kreiter vocal group and record guide, Levy falsely took writing and performance credit in order to receive royalties—enriching himself at the expense of many of his signed artists, especially black R&B artists.

Levy was convicted of extortion in 1988 on charges from an FBI investigation of alleged infiltration of organized crime into the record business. Levy died after losing his appeal, two months before he was scheduled to report to prison.

== Early life and career ==
Levy was born a Sephardic Jew in Harlem, New York City. His father and older brother died of pneumonia when Levy was four months old. He quit school at the age of 13 and ran away to Florida, where he worked as a photographer in and around nightclubs. He later joined the United States Navy.

He persuaded the owners of the nightclub where he worked to buy a club in New York, subsequently managing the club as the Cock Lounge. It became successful, attracting musicians such as Charlie Parker and Dexter Gordon, and allowed Levy to set up another club, Birdland, in 1949.

At Birdland, Levy was approached by a representative of ASCAP, seeking payment on behalf of songwriters for booking live music. He quickly appreciated the potential profits that could accrue from owning music copyrights. He then formed a publishing company, Patricia Music (named after his first wife), for which he acquired the rights to songs performed in his clubs. In 1956, he founded Roulette Records with George Goldner, initially to release rock and roll music but also diversifying into jazz. In 1967, Levy hired a personal assistant Karin Grasso, the wife of singer-songwriter Richie Grasso (another singer-songwriter signed to Roulette Records) whose work includes "Sweet Cherry Wine", co-written with Tommy James and performed by Tommy James and the Shondells. Karin assisted in all aspects of Roulette Records, including signing talent and producing music; such as Richie Grasso, Tommy James, Frankie Lymon, and Tito Puente, among many others. At one point, Morris claimed the rights to the phrase rock and roll itself, which became widely employed after its use by his friend Alan Freed. Levy added his name to the songwriting credits of many artists who recorded for his label.

In June 1975, Levy and Nathan McCalla (aka Big Nat; né Nathan Calven McCalla; 1929–1980), a vice president of Roulette Records, were indicted for assaulting an off-duty police officer, Charles Heinz, causing Heinz to lose an eye. The case was later dismissed, and all records were sealed. McCalla was subsequently murdered in Fort Lauderdale, Florida.

In the mid-1970s, Levy filed a much-publicized lawsuit against John Lennon for appropriating a line from the Chuck Berry song "You Can't Catch Me" (the publishing rights to which Levy owned) in the Beatles song "Come Together". Lennon ultimately settled with Levy by agreeing to record three songs from Levy's publishing catalogue during the sessions for his 1975 LP Rock 'n' Roll, co-produced with Phil Spector. After complications due to Spector's erratic behavior, and after attempts at a second agreement failed, Levy used demo recordings by Lennon to produce and release a mail-order album titled Roots. Levy successfully sued Lennon and was awarded $6,795, but he was countersued by Lennon, Capitol, EMI, and Apple Records, who won an award of $145,300.

== Conviction and death ==
Beginning in 1984, the FBI targeted Levy in a 3 1/2-year investigation into the alleged infiltration of organized crime into the record business. The case against Levy involved the extortion of John LaMonte, a record wholesaler in Darby, Pennsylvania. LaMonte had agreed to purchase 4.7 million cutout records on the MCA label valued at $1.25 million from Salvatore Pisello and Gaetano Vastola in a 1984 deal, and when LaMonte subsequently refused to pay the full price, claiming that the best titles had been removed from the 60-truckload delivery, Levy reportedly arranged to extort the money from him. LaMonte was subsequently assaulted, sustaining a fractured eye socket.

Levy's arrest in September 1986 at the Boston Ritz Carlton Hotel was televised nationally. Earlier that year, near the end of the investigation, Levy sold Roulette Records and his publishing rights (reported variously, for $22–55 million).

During its investigation, the FBI suspected that Levy had used the Roulette Room as a front for Vincent Gigante, allegedly the boss of the Genovese crime family, and that Levy had had ties to organized crime for 20 years. Much of the trial evidence came from covertly recorded conversations taken from wiretaps and listening devices planted in the phones and business offices of Levy and Gaetano Vastola. Levy had a sign behind his desk that read, "O Lord! Give me a Bastard with talent" where the FBI had inserted a microphone inside the letter 'O' of Lord. Two holes were also drilled in the ceiling for cameras (The Hit Men, p. 34).

Levy was convicted in May 1988 by a Federal jury in Camden, New Jersey, of two counts of conspiring to extort. Also convicted were Howard Fisher (Roulette's controller) and Dominick Canterino (a Caporegime in the Genovese crime family). Levy and Canterino faced up to 40 years in jail.

Morris Levy, speaking on his association with alleged mob figures:

I've been on Broadway 47 years. I know some of these characters, and some I like very much ... I knew Cardinal Spellman, too. That don't make me a Catholic.

Levy vehemently denied the charges. At his sentencing hearing, his attorneys cited his extensive philanthropic work, while FBI agents testified that Levy had also been a major supplier of heroin for a convicted Philadelphia drug dealer, Roland Bartlett. In October 1988 Levy was sentenced to 10 years in prison and fined $200,000, and subsequently appealed his conviction. Canterino was sentenced to 12 years in prison. Fisher's conviction was overturned. Lamonte entered the federal witness protection program.

During his appeal, Levy remained free on $3 million bail, which was secured with his upstate New York estate, Sunnyview Farm. In December 1989, shortly before his death, his conviction was upheld by the United States Court of Appeals for the Third Circuit in Philadelphia.

Also in 1989, as the principal shareholder of BeckZack Corp., which owned all 81 of the Strawberries record stores, Levy sold the chain.

In January 1990, Levy unsuccessfully petitioned to have his sentence eliminated because of his failing health. Instead he was granted a 90-day stay and was scheduled to report to jail on July 16.

Before Levy could report to jail, he died of cancer on May 20, 1990, in Ghent, New York.

== Posthumous lawsuit ==
In 1993, a court found Levy's estate posthumously liable for $4 million in a case initiated by Herman Santiago and Jimmy Merchant of the Teenagers, authors of the song "Why Do Fools Fall in Love", who sued Levy for unpaid songwriting royalties. During the trial, the two testified they had received just $1,000 for the 1956 hit, which sold more than 3 million copies. Santiago testified that Levy told him, "Don't come down here anymore or I'll have to kill you or hurt you."

However, in 1996, this ruling was overturned on appeal because Santiago and Merchant failed to submit interest due to the statute of limitations. The U.S. Supreme Court declined to hear a further appeal.

== Personal and family ==
Levy lived in a Park Avenue apartment in Manhattan, New York City and at his 1,500-acre farm, Sunnyview Farm, seven miles east of the Hudson River in Columbia County, Ghent, New York. The property had been a dairy farm. Levy initially used it to raise cattle, hay, and corn, but later used it exclusively to breed race horses. Sunnyview Farm remained a horse-breeding farm. It was later the site of The Big Up Festival.

=== Marriages ===
Levy married five times. In a 1986 interview with the Los Angeles Times, he stated, "the only thing I know about organized crime is my five ex-wives." Josh Alan Friedman, the author of a 2008 exposé of the music industry, Tell the Truth Until They Bleed, said that Levy had sent one of his wives to the hospital after beating her in a telephone booth.

- Levy first married Patricia Caraeff (née Byrne) on August 26, 1950, in Manhattan. She had been the widow of Edward Isidor Caraeff (1915–1950). Morris Levy named one of his companies, "Patricia Music," after her. They divorced in 1954 in Dade County, Florida.
- Levy married Ruth Rubin (born 1937) on December 17, 1954, in Manhattan.
- Levy married actress and model Cynthia Brooks in April 1958, but by May they were separated. They reunited on several occasions before ending their relationship (Carlin, Godfather ... , p. 125) In 1961, the columnist Dorothy Kilgallen reported that Levy dated the singer and actress Keely Smith before marrying Brooks. Brooks had been under contract at 20th Century Fox, appearing in Follow the Sun (1951) and Westward Ho, The Women (1952), and was previously a chorus girl at El Rancho Vegas. She was previously married, from May 1955 to December 1955, to Rudi Maugeri (1931–2004), lead vocalist with the Crew Cuts. Brooks was featured in a 1957 issue of Life magazine (with photographs by Peter Stackpole). She then obtained telephone numbers in 26 cities nationwide under the pseudonym Brandy Lee, with instructions for men to receive four of her photographs for a dollar — drawing as many as 4,000 calls a day, hoping ultimately to raise $100,000 for a mail-order gown business. She later left show business to open a ski school in Lake Dallas, Texas.
- Levy married Jean "Nom" Glassell (née Jean Noemi Aubert) in February 1962 in Miami. She had previously been married to millionaire Texas oilman Alfred C. Glassell Jr. who, among other things, founded Transcontinental Gas Pipeline Corporation in 1946, the first gas transmission system from Texas to New York.
- Levy married Karen Levy (née Brenda Karen White; born 1955) on April 1, 1979, in Martin County, Florida. Together, they had two sons. At the time of Morris Levy's death, they were in divorce proceedings.

=== Sibling ===
Levy's older brother, Zachariah (Irving) Levy (1923–1959), the manager of Birdland, was fatally stabbed there on January 26, 1959 (after the night of January 25) while Urbie Green was performing. His body was discovered in the rear of the club, near the service area. The stabbing had apparently occurred unnoticed by patrons. Morris subsequently took over Irving's role in the club; and from 1959 through the early 1960s, the club enjoyed great success as one of the few remaining jazz clubs in the area. According to Fredric Dannen in his book Hit Men, Irving had been stabbed for blocking a prostitute – and wife of an organized crime loan shark – from entering the club. In Levy's 1986 extortion trial, the FBI said that Levy's brother was killed mistakenly by organized-crime figures attempting to kill Morris Levy.

=== Children ===
Levy had three sons:

- Adam R. Levy (born 1962) of Rumson, New Jersey; as of 2012, Adam owned a medical marijuana company, Medical Growth Consulting, and was set to become the first company to market medical marijuana in New Jersey. The venture's application was refused by the New Jersey Health Department on the basis of Morris Levy's 1988 felony conviction. Adam Levy had been impressed with the positive effect of marijuana on his father's lucidity during his final days with cancer. Adam founded Warlock Records in 1985.
- Simon Beckett Levy (born 1979)
- Zach Levy (né Daniel Zachariah Levy; born 1982) is the president and CEO of Shireworks Productions, which produced The Big Up Festival at Levy's Sunnyview Farm.

== Philanthropy ==
Levy served on the board of the Boston Opera Company, was chairman emeritus of the United Jewish Appeal (Music Division) and helped raise millions of dollars for other charities. He was named "Man of the Year" by United Jewish Appeal in 1973, serving on the board of Columbia County Hospital and he chaired fundraisers for the Black Congressional Choir, the Foundling Hospital, and St. Patrick's Cathedral Choir.

The Morris Levy Charitable Foundation was created following his death in 1990.

== Media ==
=== Filmography (videography) ===
Levy was played by Paul Mazursky in the 1998 film Why Do Fools Fall in Love, and he was an inspiration for the HBO television series The Sopranos (1999–2007) character Hesh Rabkin—who made a fortune defrauding mostly R&B performers, underpaying royalties, pressing unauthorized records, and who owned lavish New Jersey horse-racing stables. Levy was also portrayed by David Gianopoulos in the 1999 television film Mr. Rock 'n' Roll: The Alan Freed Story.

=== Book (non fiction) ===
Levy featured prominently in the 2010 autobiography Me, The Mob, and The Music by Tommy James, leader of the 1960s rock band Tommy James and the Shondells. James had not felt comfortable writing the book until all those who were deeply involved with the record company had died. Martin Scorsese approached James about making a movie of the book shortly after publication.

In the book, James characterized Levy as willing to strong-arm the talent, saying artists signed to Roulette were there to produce money for the company, having their needs met only when it pleased Levy. Asking to be paid meant intimidation; to survive, those under contract to Roulette needed to find a means of generating income that did not involve the record company, such as personally booked tours. While a Roulette artist had great creative control when recording for the company, the lack of payment for those efforts was difficult.

James estimated that Roulette owed him $30–40 million in unpaid royalties. James said Roulette was a front for organized crime, and functioned as a money laundering operation. In the early 1970s, Levy was at the wrong end of a mob war. James had to leave New York for a time to avoid a mob hit, which explained why he recorded an album in Nashville in 1972.

It was only after Roulette Records and Levy's Big Seven Music publishing company were sold (the record company to an EMI and Rhino Records partnership, the music publishing company to Windswept Pacific Music which was later sold to EMI) that James began to receive significant royalty checks from sales of his records.

== Companies ==
Music companies, record companies and labels owned by Levy included the following:

- Adam VIII
- Big Seven Music
- Buddah Records
- Calla
- Domino Records
- Gee Records
- Gone Records
- I&M Teleproducts
- Kama Sutra Records / Sutra
- Patricia Music
- Roost Records
- Roulette Records
- Sugar Hill Records
- Sunnyview
- TK Records
- Tico Records
- Alegre Records
- Mardi Gras Records International
- Swinger Records
- Speed Records
- Sabor Records
- Branston Music
- Tiger Lily Records (US Version)
