= The Muppet Movie =

1979 film by James Frawley

- Theatrical release poster by Drew Struzan
- Directed by: James Frawley
- Written by: Jerry Juhl; Jack Burns
- Based on: The Muppet Show by Jim Henson
- Produced by: Jim Henson
- Starring: Jim Henson; Frank Oz; Jerry Nelson; Richard Hunt; Dave Goelz; Charles Durning; Austin Pendleton; Edgar Bergen; Milton Berle; Mel Brooks; James Coburn; Dom DeLuise; Elliott Gould; Bob Hope; Madeline Kahn; Carol Kane; Cloris Leachman; Steve Martin; Richard Pryor; Telly Savalas; Orson Welles; Paul Williams
- Cinematography: Isidore Mankofsky
- Edited by: Christopher Greenbury
- Music by: Paul Williams; Kenneth Ascher
- Production companies: ITC Entertainment; Henson Associates
- Distributed by: ITC Film Distributors Limited (Note: The film rights were purchased by The Jim Henson Company from ITC Entertainment in August 1984. The film rights were then acquired by Walt Disney Studios upon their parent company's acquisition of the Muppets franchise in 2004; the film has since been reissued under the Walt Disney Pictures banner for home media releases. Since 1981, Universal Pictures retains theatrical distribution in the United States due to prior contractual obligations with the former Associated Film Distribution and ITC, but the film's ownership and copyright are controlled by Disney.) (United Kingdom and Ireland); Associated Film Distribution (North America)
- Release dates: May 31, 1979 (United Kingdom); June 22, 1979 (United States)
- Running time: 97 minutes (UK version); 95 minutes (US version)
- Countries: United Kingdom; United States
- Language: English
- Budget: $8 million
- Box office: $76.7 million

The Muppet Movie is a 1979 musical road comedy film, directed by James Frawley and produced by Jim Henson, and the first theatrical film to feature the Muppets. A co-production between the United Kingdom and the United States, the film was written by The Muppet Show writers Jerry Juhl and Jack Burns. Produced during the third season of The Muppet Show, the film tells the origin story of the Muppets, as Kermit the Frog embarks on a cross-country trip to Los Angeles, encountering several of the Muppets—who all share the same ambition of finding success in professional show business—along the way while being pursued by Doc Hopper, a greedy restaurateur with intentions of recruiting Kermit to promote his frog legs business.

The film stars Muppet performers Henson, Frank Oz, Jerry Nelson, Richard Hunt, and Dave Goelz, as well as Charles Durning and Austin Pendleton, and it features cameo appearances by Bob Hope, Dom DeLuise, James Coburn, Cloris Leachman, Richard Pryor, Telly Savalas, Edgar Bergen (in his final film appearance before his death), Orson Welles, Madeline Kahn, Milton Berle, Carol Kane, Steve Martin, Mel Brooks, Elliott Gould, and Paul Williams. Notable for its surreal humour, meta-references and prolific use of cameos, The Muppet Movie was released by Associated Film Distribution in the United Kingdom on May 31, 1979, and in the United States on June 22, 1979.

The film received critical praise, including two Academy Award nominations for Paul Williams and Kenneth Ascher's musical score and their song "Rainbow Connection". The film grossed $76.7 million worldwide against an $8 million budget. The Muppet Movie was followed by seven feature films starring the Muppets as well as several more television series and media. In 2009, the film was deemed "culturally, historically, or aesthetically significant" by the Library of Congress and selected for preservation in the National Film Registry.

== Plot ==
The story opens with the Muppets sitting down for a private screening of a movie that acts as an origin story of how they all met.

Kermit the Frog lives a simple life in a Florida swamp. After he plays his banjo and sings "Rainbow Connection", he is approached by Bernie, a talent agent who encourages him to pursue a career in show business. Inspired, Kermit sets off on a cross-country trip to Hollywood.

He meets Fozzie Bear, who is working as a hapless stand-up comedian, and invites him on his journey. The two set out in Fozzie's 1951 Studebaker but are pursued by entrepreneur Doc Hopper and his assistant Max, who try to convince Kermit to be the new spokesfrog of Hopper's struggling French-fried frog legs restaurant franchise. Horrified, Kermit refuses, and he and Fozzie drive away. Unwilling to accept Kermit's refusal, Hopper follows the pair and resorts to increasingly forceful means of persuasion. In an old church, Kermit and Fozzie meet the rock band Dr. Teeth and the Electric Mayhem, and their manager Scooter, who help them disguise their car. Driving on, they meet and are joined by Gonzo and his girlfriend Camilla the Chicken, who are also interested in becoming movie stars. They trade in their failing vehicle at a used car lot, where they meet Sweetums. They invite Sweetums to come with them, but he runs away. The others drive away, only for Sweetums to emerge and reveal that he had only gone to pack his things.

The group meets Miss Piggy at a county fair and she and Kermit become love-stricken with each other. When they meet for dinner that night, Hopper and Max abduct Miss Piggy as bait to lure Kermit. When they capture Kermit, Hopper orders mad scientist Professor Krassman to give Kermit an electric lobotomy so that he would willingly perform in Hopper's advertisements, but Miss Piggy knocks out Hopper's henchmen and causes Krassman to have his brain fried by his own device. Immediately after the fight, however, Miss Piggy receives a job offer and abandons a devastated Kermit.

Joined by Rowlf the Dog, the Muppets pick up Miss Piggy – who is hitchhiking on the side of the road – and continue their journey; but their car breaks down in the desert. Sitting at a campfire, the group realizes that they will likely miss the auditions the next day. Kermit wanders off, ashamed for bringing his friends on a fruitless journey, but personal reflection restores his commitment. He returns to camp, where he discovers that the Electric Mayhem have come to their rescue, having learned of their plight by reading ahead in the film's script. The Mayhem offer to drive the group the rest of the way in their bus.

The group is warned by a reformed Max that Hopper has hired an assassin, Snake Walker, to kill Kermit. Kermit decides to face his aggressor and proposes a Western-style showdown in a nearby ghost town. There, they find inventor Dr. Bunsen Honeydew and his assistant Beaker. Kermit and his friends are saved when one of Dr. Honeydew's inventions, "insta-grow" pills, enlarges Mayhem drummer Animal, who frightens away Hopper and his henchmen.

Once the Muppets reach the Hollywood studio, they meet executive Lew Lord, who signs them to a "standard 'rich and famous' contract". The first take in their attempt to perform the script goes awry when Gonzo crashes into the prop rainbow, which knocks the scenery down and an explosion blows a hole in the roof of the studio, but a real rainbow shines through the hole and illuminates all the Muppets. Joined by characters from other Henson productions – including Sesame Street, Emmet Otter's Jug-Band Christmas, and The Land of Gorch – the Muppets sing the final verse in a reprise of "Rainbow Connection". As the film ends, Sweetums tears through the screen, elated that he caught up with them.

== Cast ==
- Charles Durning as Doc Hopper, a businessman, entrepreneur, and restaurateur.
- Austin Pendleton as Max, Doc Hopper's shy right-hand man and sidekick.
- Scott Walker as Snake Walker, an assassin who specializes in killing frogs.
- H.B. Haggerty as Lumberjack
- Bruce Kirby as Gate Guard
- James Frawley as a Waiter at El Sleezo Café where Fozzie is doing his act

=== Muppet performers ===
- Jim Henson as Kermit the Frog, Rowlf the Dog, Dr. Teeth, Waldorf and The Swedish Chef
- Frank Oz as Miss Piggy, Fozzie Bear, Animal, Sam Eagle and Marvin Suggs
- Jerry Nelson as Floyd Pepper, Crazy Harry, Robin the Frog, Lew Zealand and Camilla the Chicken
- Richard Hunt as Scooter, Statler, Janice, Sweetums and Beaker
- Dave Goelz as The Great Gonzo, Zoot, Dr. Bunsen Honeydew and Doglion
- Caroll Spinney as Big Bird

Oz appears in a cameo as a biker who beats up Fozzie Bear while Steve Whitmire appears as a man in the Bogen County Fair.

=== Special guest stars (in order of appearance) ===
- Dom DeLuise as Bernie, a Hollywood agent who meets Kermit in the swamp. The character's name alludes to Bernie Brillstein, talent agent and producer of the original Muppet Show.
- James Coburn as the El Sleezo Café Owner
- Madeline Kahn as an El Sleezo Patron with the same rhotacism and personality Kahn used for Lili von Shtupp in Blazing Saddles
- Telly Savalas as El Sleezo Tough
- Carol Kane as the lisping "miss" (summoned by the word “myth”)
- Paul Williams as the El Sleezo Pianist.
- Milton Berle as Mad Man Mooney, a used car salesman who employs Sweetums as a jack.
- Elliott Gould as the Compère who announces Miss Piggy as the winner of the Bogen County Beauty Pageant.
- Edgar Bergen as himself and Charlie McCarthy playing judges at the County Fair. This appearance marks Bergen's last film; he died soon after. The film was dedicated in his memory.
- Bob Hope as an Ice Cream Vendor who serves cones to Fozzie at the County Fair.
- Richard Pryor as a Balloon Vendor who sells balloons to Gonzo at the County Fair.
- Steve Martin as an insolent waiter working at the restaurant where Rowlf plays piano.
- Mel Brooks as Professor Krassman, a mad scientist hired by Doc Hopper.
- Cloris Leachman as Miss Tracy, Lew Lord's secretary who is allergic to animals.
- Orson Welles as Lew Lord, a Hollywood producer and studio executive. The character's name alludes to Sir Lew Grade, head of ATV, the British company that co-produced The Muppet Show.

== Production ==
=== Development ===
After the popularity of the Muppets had grown following the success of The Muppet Show, Lew Grade agreed to finance the production of the film and signed the deal with his company ITC Entertainment, which helped Jim Henson finance the film. After the film's production greenlit, Jim Henson and selected team members traveled to California various times to develop the script, music, and infrastructure in Hollywood to shoot the film. James Frawley was hired to direct the movie due to the film's challenges.

During Frawley and Henson's first meeting in London, they were concerned that the Muppets would not blend well in real life. Along with Frank Oz and the team, they filmed and tested how the characters would appear in real-world locations during the first few days of June 1978 in a UK meadow. During filming tests, a cow was ambled near Fozzie for an unexpected rear look at a comparison between fake and natural fur hair. The camera tests attracted the investment of ITC Entertainment. On July 3, 1978, Henson flew to Los Angeles again to begin shooting for the film.

=== Filming ===
Principal photography began on July 5, 1978, and continued for 87 days during summer and fall of that year. Each minute took a day to be filmed. Filming locations included Albuquerque, New Mexico as well as various parts of Los Angeles and Northern California, including the San Fernando Valley. The Western street scenes were filmed on the former Columbia Ranch, then known as The Burbank Studios. Additionally, the interior shots were filmed at CBS-MTM Studios. All the sets were elevated by five feet to allow the puppeteers to perform. According to Henson, the principal photography of the film was slower than in television. No effects were added after filming concluded.

Austin Pendleton recalled that the film was shot on "a very unhappy set, because Jim [Frawley] was very unhappy directing that movie. And I noticed that was the only time the Muppet people used an outside person to direct a Muppet movie. They never did that again. After that, it was either Jim Henson or Frank Oz. And I would have liked to have been in one of those, because those sets were very harmonious. But this was not."

Several shots required Muppets standing and acting in a full-body shot. To perform Kermit sitting on a log, Henson squeezed into a specially designed metal container complete with an air hose (to breathe), a rubber sleeve which came out of the top to perform Kermit and a monitor to see his performance, and placed himself under the water, log, and the Kermit puppet. He was also assisted in this operation by Kathryn Mullen and Steve Whitmire. During breaks, cups of ice tea were given to Henson through the rubber sleeve since he could not easily leave the tank. Rescuers had to stand by the tank to pull Henson out if the tank leaked or the air supply had difficulties. The scene took five days to be filmed.

In order for Kermit to ride a bicycle in a full-body shot, a Kermit puppet with legs was posed onto the seat and his legs and arms were attached to the pedals and handlebars. An overhead crane with a marionette system held the bicycle through strong strings invisible to the camera, guiding the bicycle forward. The crane and system were out of the camera's frame of vision. Specially made, remote-controlled puppets were placed on the set and controlled by puppeteers out of the frame. A dancing Kermit and Fozzie Bear were operated by Henson and Oz in front of a blue screen, and they were composited onto a separate reel of the stage. For scenes involving Fozzie driving a Studebaker, cables, TV monitors, puppeteers, and its Muppets were filled in. A dwarf would sit in the trunk and control via remote control. A television monitor showed what was ahead.

The closing reprise of "Rainbow Connection" featured a crowd of more than 250 Muppet characters—virtually every Muppet that had been created up to that point in time. According to Henson Archivist Karen Falk, 137 puppeteers were enlisted from the Puppeteers of America (along with the regular Muppets performers) to perform every Muppet extant. Prior to the day-long filming of the shot, Henson gave the enthusiastic participants a lesson in the art of cinematic puppetry. The scene involved 150 puppeteers performing in a pit that was 6 feet (1.8 m) deep and 17 feet (5.2 m) wide. In September 1978, Edgar Bergen, Henson's idol who appeared in a cameo role, died shortly after completing his scenes. Henson was asked by his family to say a few words with Kermit for his memorial service. Henson agreed, and he attended Bergen's memorial service for its speech. Henson dedicated the film to his memory.

=== Music ===
The film's music and lyrics were written by Paul Williams and Kenneth Ascher. Regarding the music's composition, Williams said; "Jim Henson gave you more [creative] freedom than anybody I've ever worked with in my life. I said, 'You want to hear the songs as we're writing them?' He said, 'No. I'll hear them in the studio. I know I'm gonna love them.' You just don't get that kind of freedom on a project these days." "Never Before, Never Again" was originally sung by Johnny Mathis, but was changed to Miss Piggy when Jim Henson thought it would be funnier if she sang it to herself. Mathis would later sing the song in the television special The Muppets Go Hollywood.

"Movin' Right Along", "Never Before, Never Again", and "I Hope That Somethin' Better Comes Along" were shortened in the film, compared to their soundtrack versions, for continuity purposes. The latter, a duet between Rowlf and Kermit, contained references that the studio considered too mature for children, although the song appeared complete in the British theatrical and home video debut versions.

== Release ==
The Muppet Movie had a royal premiere at the Leicester Square Theatre in London on May 31, 1979, attended by Princess Anne. In the United States, the film premiered with a celebration at the Coconut Grove in Hollywood, Los Angeles. It was later released with limited release in New York City, Toronto, Los Angeles, Wichita, Kansas City, Austin, and the Dallas–Fort Worth metroplex on June 22, 1979. The film rolled out gradually throughout the United States and Canada. In celebration of the film's 40th anniversary, The Muppet Movie returned to theaters for two days on July 25 and 30, 2019. The film also returned to theaters to celebrate its 45th anniversary on June 2 and 3, 2024, via Fathom Events.

=== Marketing ===
In May 1979, CBS aired The Muppets Go Hollywood, a one-hour television special that promoted the then-upcoming release of The Muppet Movie. In April, the film had been promoted when the Muppets hosted The Tonight Show Starring Johnny Carson. Additionally, a book adaptation of The Muppet Movie, adapted by Steven Crist, was published by Peacock Press/Bantam Books.

In Austin, Texas, then-CBS affiliate KTBC-TV and American International Traveler sponsored a contest where adults who paid to see the film in the area were eligible to win a free trip to Hollywood.

=== Home media ===
The Muppet Movie was the first film by ITC Films to be released on home video when Magnetic Video issued it in May 1980, having acquired the video rights to ITC's films. It was reissued in 1982 and 1984 by CBS/Fox Video. On January 29, 1993, Buena Vista Home Video re-released the film under their Jim Henson Video label on VHS and LaserDisc, pricing at $24.99. The movie was reissued again on VHS by Columbia TriStar Home Video and Jim Henson Home Entertainment on June 1, 1999, followed by a DVD release on June 5, 2001.

After The Walt Disney Company's acquisition of the Muppets in 2004, the film rights to The Muppet Movie were acquired by Disney; the film was reissued under the Walt Disney Pictures banner in home media formats and was re-released by Buena Vista Home Entertainment on DVD on November 29, 2005, as part of the Kermit's 50th Anniversary Edition line. Disney released the film as the Nearly 35th Anniversary Edition on Blu-ray Disc and DVD on August 13, 2013. The film now streams in 4K Ultra HD on Disney+.

== Reception ==
=== Box office ===
In its first six days at the Leicester Square Theatre, it grossed $31,884. The film would later earn over $76.7 million in the United States and Canada, returning $32 million in box office rentals. For 32 years, The Muppet Movie was the highest-grossing puppet film until the release of The Muppets in 2011.

The film's successful theatrical release encouraged Lew Grade into furthering his own film distribution company, which later backfired with the massive box office failures of Can't Stop the Music (from EMI) and Raise the Titanic (from ITC), both released by Associated Film Distribution just a year later.

=== Critical reception ===
The Muppet Movie currently holds an 89% approval rating on Rotten Tomatoes, based on 102 reviews. The site's consensus says "The Muppet Movie, the big-screen debut of Jim Henson's plush creations, is smart, lighthearted, and fun for all ages." On Metacritic, the film has a weighted average score of 74 out of 100 based on 7 reviews, indicating "generally favorable reviews".

The film received highly positive reviews in the United States. Roger Ebert of the Chicago Sun-Times gave the film three-and-a-half out of four stars. In his favorable review, he was fascinated that "The Muppet Movie not only stars the Muppets but, for the first time, shows us their feet." Vincent Canby of The New York Times offered equal praise, stating that the film "demonstrates once again that there's always room in movies for unbridled amiability when it is governed by intelligence and wit." Gene Siskel of the Chicago Tribune gave the film three-and-a-half stars out of four and called it "surely one of the summer's most entertaining films," which "does a fairly nice job of trying to be all things to all people. Which is not an easy job." Dale Pollock of Variety wrote, "'The Muppet Movie' is a winner... Script by Jerry Juhl and Jack Burns incorporates the zingy one-liners and bad puns that have become the teleseries' trade mark, but also develops the Muppets themselves as thinking, feeling characters." Kathleen Carroll of the New York Daily News wrote that "with the exception of Brooks' wacky scene and Steve Martin's funny bit as a snooty waiter, the cameo appearances by such stars as Bob Hope and Richard Pryor tend to slow the action down just as the bland musical numbers by Paul Williams and Kenny Asher interrupt the flow of the movie. Still The Muppet Movie should entrance both young and old as the Muppets further endear themselves with their crazy antics, their playful puns and their very human characteristics." Rex Reed, in the same newspaper, reacted more enthusiastically to the film, remarking that "if there's any doubt, The Muppet Movie will make believers and fans out of the worst pessimists. These lovable characters are so real and so endearing that I was never aware of the human hands making them work from mysterious hiding places. The Muppets made a wide-eyed, child out of me, and I hope they continue to do so until I'm in my wheelchair."

Charles Champlin of the Los Angeles Times wrote, "as you might well expect, it is hip, funny, technically ingenious, fast-moving, melodious, richly produced, contemporary and equally and utterly beguiling to grown-ups and small persons." Katrine Ames of Newsweek stated, "'The Muppet Movie' is a delectable grab bag of influences — stories by L. Frank Baum and Lewis Carroll, Westerns, the Crosby-Hope and Garland-Rooney movies — as well as its own inventive devices. The result is a kind of 'That's Entertainment!' with a plot attached. Its charm — and success — lie primarily in its loving pokes at Hollywood conventions and in the lovable characters who do the poking." John Skow of Time magazine offered a more mixed response, saying that "the transition from the yank-'em-off-if-they-bomb lunacy of the TV show to the coherent narration of the film is not a complete success. Muppet magic remains a bewildering succession of wonderful bits, and perhaps the movie's best occurs when Rowlf the Dog, who is a barroom pianist, commiserates with Kermit, who has just been deserted by Miss Piggy. The two sing a nice, rueful song about women—the can't-live-with-them, can't-live-without-them kind of thing."

Michael Hanton of the Toronto Star wrote that "I was looking forward to a combination of Singin' in the Rain, Citizen Kane, and Intolerance. What I got was more like Gidget, The Great Race and Love Boat"; he also remarked that Fozzie Bear stole the show from his favorite character, Miss Piggy.

In the United Kingdom, it received mixed to positive reviews. Tim Radford of The Guardian called it "another film spun slightly longer than it should have been", adding that "the humour remains decently dry and self-deprecating throughout; on the other hand there isn't nearly enough of it, and a good 40 or 50 minute idea is padded to the obligatory hour and a half with songs, travelogue, flashbacks and a certain amount of mooning about." Patrick Gibbs of The Daily Telegraph remarked that "after the Wombles moved, as they did recently, from the small screen to the big, so the Muppets inevitably follow, rather more successfully, I think, for James Frawley’s The Muppet Movie is a clever construction." He also said that "the style is cunningly varied at intervals by the appearance in virtually two-line parts of such people as Milton Berle, James Coburn, Dom DeLuise or Elliott Gould, not to mention Orson Welles, each in his own comic persona. Songs also help to add variety to a very hazardous undertaking; not at all to my taste, it comes off, I would say, as well as possible." Alexander Walker of the London Evening Standard supplied the film with its most positive review in the country, calling it "the most original little show in town", and adding that it offered:

Across the board delight: not only for the children: for adults, too, who'll relish its in-jokes, visual wit, cheeky parodies of other movies and [its] own brand of surrealist fun.

That's the first surprise. The second is how successfully the Muppets take to the big blow-up of the cinema screen. But this is no jumped-up clone of the TV show. It expands its own fun to fill its enlarged running-time.

It reminds you of a "Road" film. But instead of Hope, Crosby and Lamour, it has a cloth-and-styrofoam cast who look more human than the famous humanoids like Orson Welles, Mel Brooks, Telly Savalas and (yes) Bob Hope they meet en route.

The Muppets "magic," supplied by creator-producer Jim Henson and other talented artists operating the globe puppets from hiding places that a sewer rat would think cramped, endow their stars with independent life and liveliness.

== Accolades ==
Awards & nominations
Award	Date of ceremony	Category	Recipients and nominees	Result	Ref.
Academy Awards	April 14, 1980	Best Original Song Score and Its Adaptation or Adaptation Score	Songs by Paul Williams and Kenny Ascher; Adaptation by Paul Williams	Nominated	
Academy Awards	April 14, 1980	Best Original Song	"Rainbow Connection"; Music and Lyrics by Paul Williams and Kenny Ascher	Nominated	
Golden Globe Awards	January 26, 1980	Best Original Song	"Rainbow Connection"; Music and Lyrics by Paul Williams and Kenny Ascher	Nominated	
Grammy Awards	February 27, 1980	Best Album for Children	Jim Henson and Paul Williams	Won	
Grammy Awards	February 27, 1980	Best Score Soundtrack for Visual Media	Jim Henson and Paul Williams	Nominated	
Satellite Awards	February 23, 2014	Best Youth Blu-ray	Walt Disney Studios Home Entertainment	Nominated	
Saturn Awards	July 26, 1980	Best Fantasy Film		Won	
Saturn Awards	July 26, 1980	Best Writing	Jack Burns and Jerry Juhl	Nominated	
Saturn Awards	July 26, 1980	Best Music	Paul Williams	Nominated	
Saturn Awards	July 26, 1980	Best Special Effects	Robbie Knott	Nominated	

== Legacy ==
In 2009, it was selected for preservation in the National Film Registry by the Library of Congress for being "culturally, historically or aesthetically significant." In 2020, "Rainbow Connection" was deemed "culturally, historically, or aesthetically significant" by the Library of Congress and selected for preservation in the National Recording Registry. One of the two 1951 Studebaker Commander 2-door sedans used in the film is now on display at the Studebaker National Museum in South Bend, Indiana. The car was used for the driving scenes. The bottom of the front seat was removed, and the puppeteers lay on the floor to move the muppets. The car was driven by an operator seated in the trunk using remote controls. A camera hidden in the "bullet" at the front of the car provided a closed-circuit video feed to a monitor in the trunk for the operator. In July 2025 the car completed an 18-month restoration.

== Works cited ==
- Jay Jones, Brian (2013). Jim Henson: The Biography. Ballantine Books (Random House). ISBN 9780345526120.
- Durrett, Deanne (1994). The Importance of Jim Henson. Lucent Books. ISBN 9781560060482.
