= The Big Up Festival =

The Big Up Festival was a three-day festival that consisted of music, arts, and culture. The festival took place at Sunnyview Farm in Ghent, New York that bring together musical entertainment, interactive art, and sustainable initiatives. Organized by Shireworks Productions, The Big Up had its roots in music events and festivals as well as an underlying theme of environmental awareness.

== Sunnyview Farm ==
The festival's location, Sunnyview Farm, was established as a dairy and later as the thoroughbred racing horse farm of Morris Levy, described by Billboard as "one of the record industry's most controversial and flamboyant players." At Sunnyview, Levy entertained, among others, John Lennon and Tommy James. Zach Levy, of Shireworks Productions, is producer of the Big Up Festival — and Morris Levy's son.

After the Let it Roll Festival in 2009, the 1500 acre Sunnyview Farm became a venue for small festivals and concerts with accommodating five performance stages, an onsite farmer's market, local vending, large-scale multimedia installations, and workshops to highlight sustainable skills and collaborative art.

Location of Sunnyview Farm: 42°16′41.09″N 73°38′23.66″W

== 2009 Let it Roll Festival : End of Summer Extravaganza ==
2009's Let It Roll: End of Summer Extravaganza, which ran September 18, 19, 20, was produced by Zach Levy (son of Morris Levy), Ruralliance, Number Line Productions and the band Pawnshop Roses. The event was a two-night, three-day music and camping Featuring 31 bands. The name came from Pawnshop Roses' song "Let it Roll." After the 2009 Let it Roll Festival, Shireworks Productions changed the festival name to "The Big Up."

== 2010 The Big Up Festival ==
The 2010 Big Up Festival originally announced festival dates as June 17–19, but later rescheduled to August 5, 6 and 7 due to scheduling conflicts. The Big Up ran for three days from August 5–7, 2010. The Big Up 2010 artist lineup included two sets from RAQ and performances by Headtronics, Telepath, Pnuma Trio, Emancipator, Big Gigantic, Roots of Creation, OTT, Sub Swara, The Breakfast, Kung Fu, Twiddle, NY Funk Exchange, Eskmo, and Higher Organix. In addition, there were performances from Roots of Creation, The Indobox, BuzzUniverse, Archnemesis, Lucid, Twiddle, Dirty Paris, Timbre Coup, NY Funk Exchange, Sonic Spank, Beam & Deem, Consider The Source, Ultraviolet Hippopotamus, Dopapod, The Maniac All-Stars, Capital Zen, Nadis Warriors, The Jack, Mentally Ill, Leila, Ian Stewart, DJ Brad Lee, Blue Boy Productions, ELECTRONICAnonymous, Tucci, JamAntics, Moses & The Electric Company, The Edd, The High Peaks Band, Pia Mater, Fever Train, Mos Opus, Seed, lespecial, Positive Mental Trip, The Aposoul, Sugar Proof, The People's Blues of Richmond, Deafened by Love, Asleep in a Box, Wobblesauce, Mondo Gecko, John Snyder Performing, horiZonwireLess, Rogue Chimp, MAAZE, and The Grey Area.

== 2011 The Big Up Festival ==
The 2011 Big Up Festival was held on July 28, 29 and 30, 2011. The event featured 50 hours of electronica and jam band music on multiple stages, arts, culture, and multimedia experiences and included a woods village with its own stage, vending, activities and camping accommodations. The Big Up Festival 2011 also featured increased arts and multimedia installations throughout the entire festival grounds.

== 2013 The Big Up Festival ==
The 2013 Big Up Festival was held on August 8 – 10 on County Route 11 at Hemlock Hollow Farm, in Claverack, NY. The event featured performances by artists and musicians including Holy Fuck, Escort, Jojo Mayer & Nerve, Higher Organix, Kung Fu, Dopapod, Brothers Past, Normal Instruments, Party Supplies, FiKus, and other artists.

== Ruralliance and Shireworks Productions ==
In 2007, Ruralliance produced Shirefest. This was the group's first music festival held on August 3, 2007, in New Marlborough, MA. Shire Fest brought together a variety of music from jam to electronic. There was also art, dancers, multimedia displays, and food and craft vendors. After the Shire Fest, Ruralliance began putting together more events such as Harvest Ween at Catamount Ski Area in South Egremont and OTT in the Shire with Sub Swara on Saint Patrick's Day of 2009, at the East Over Resort in Lenox, MA.
