= Miss Piggy =

Muppet character

- The Muppets character
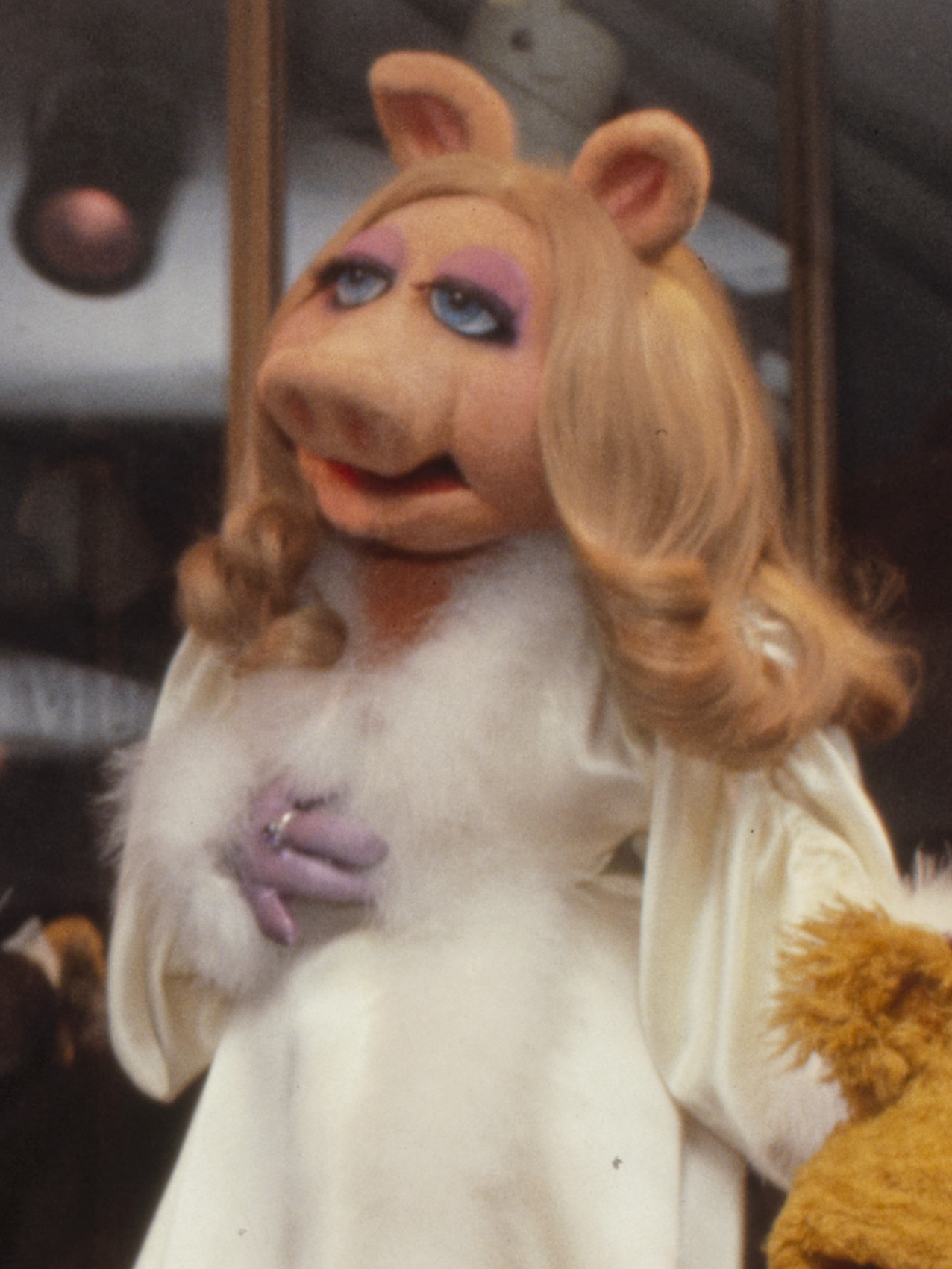
- First appearance: Herb Alpert and the TJB (1974)
- Created by: Bonnie Erickson (designer); Frank Oz (characterization)
- Performed by: Frank Oz (1976–2002); Eric Jacobson (2001–present)

In-universe information
- Full name: Miss Pigethia Lee
- Species: Muppet pig
- Gender: Female
- Occupation: Actress; Singer; Model; Writer; Magazine editor; Talk show host
- Family: Andy and Randy Pig (nephews)
- Significant other: Kermit the Frog (on-and-off)
- Nationality: American

Miss Pigethia "Piggy" Lee is a Muppet character known for her breakout role in the sketch comedy television series The Muppet Show. She is notable for her temperamental diva superstar personality, her tendency to use French phrases in her speech, and practicing karate. The character is also known for her on-again/off-again relationship with Kermit the Frog. Frank Oz performed the character from 1976 to 2002 and was succeeded by Eric Jacobson in 2001.

Since her debut in 1974, Miss Piggy has become a celebrity fixture in international pop culture, with a distinguished career in film, television, fashion, recording, and publishing, and has been widely identified as both a feminist and drag icon. In 1996, TV Guide ranked her number 23 on its 50 Greatest TV Stars of All Time list. In a 2001 Channel 4 poll in the UK, Miss Piggy was ranked 29th on their list of the 100 Greatest TV Characters. In 1996, a cook book entitled In the Kitchen With Miss Piggy: Fabulous Recipes from My Famous Celebrity Friends by Moi was released. In 2015, she was honored by the Brooklyn Museum's Elizabeth A. Sackler Center for Feminist Art for her achievements and contributions to breaking gender roles in the entertainment industry.

A Lady Liberty-inspired Miss Piggy statue previously stood as the centerpiece of a fountain in front of Rizzo the Rat's PizzeRizzo restaurant at Disney's Hollywood Studios. Miss Piggy has a collective star on the Hollywood Walk of Fame as a member of the Muppets, which they received on March 20, 2012, in the category of Motion Pictures.

== Characterization ==
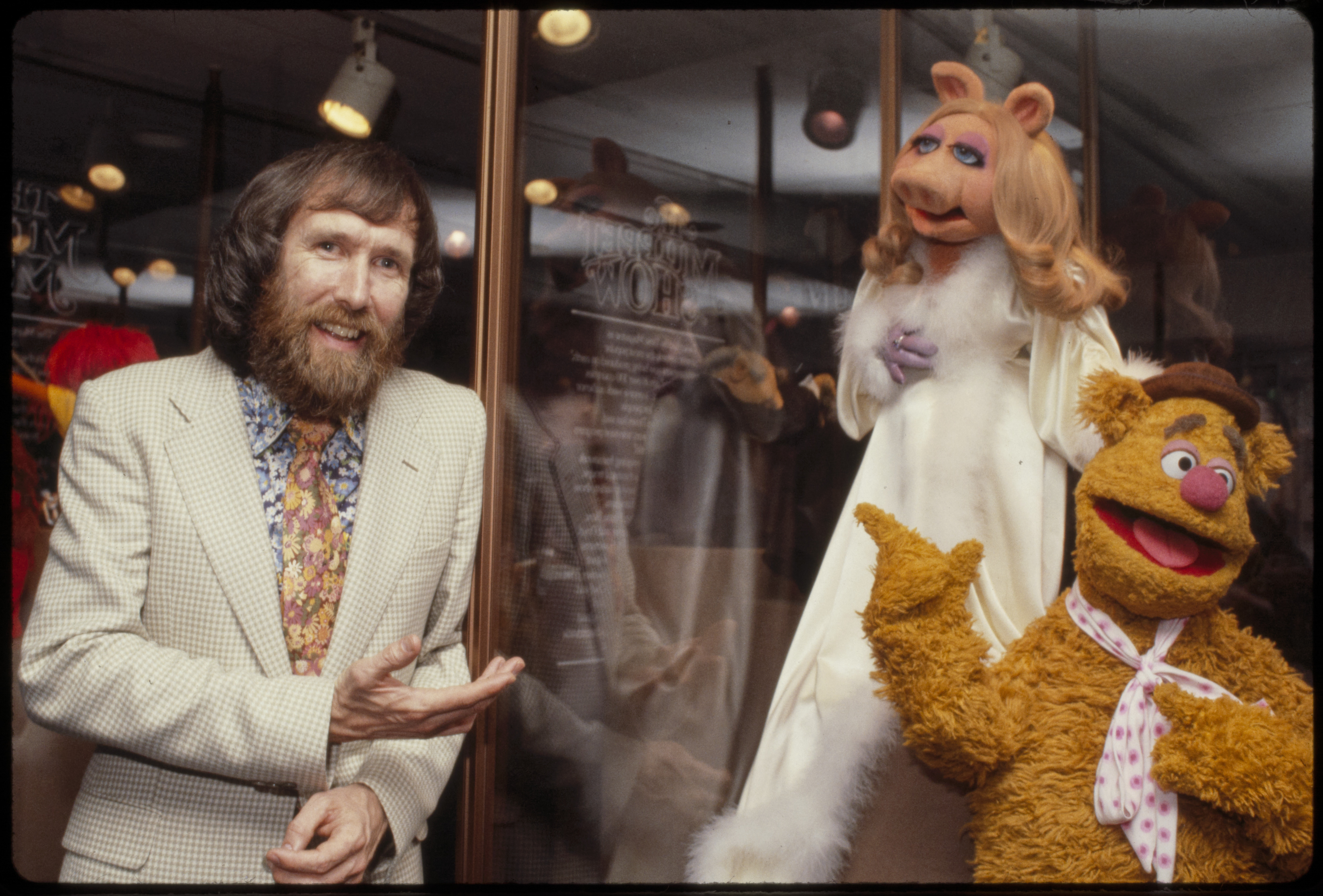
Jim Henson with a Miss Piggy puppet and Fozzie Bear puppet in 1979.

=== Origins and description ===
In a 1979 interview with The New York Times, performer Frank Oz outlined Piggy's biography: "She grew up in a small town; her father died when she was young and her mother wasn't that nice to her. She had to enter beauty contests to survive. She has a lot of vulnerability which she has to hide, because of her need to be a superstar". During development of The Muppet Show, Oz assigned a hook for each Muppet he performed; Miss Piggy's hook was a "truck driver wanting to be a woman". Oz has also stated that while Fozzie Bear is a two-dimensional character and Animal has no dimensions, Miss Piggy is one of the few Muppet characters to be fully realized in three dimensions.

She loves wearing long gloves; Hildegarde, who used to wear them, once said, "Miss Piggy stole the gloves idea from me”. Miss Piggy's name was also inspired by jazz singer Peggy Lee.

=== Relationship with Kermit ===
Since the debut of The Muppet Show, the romantic relationship between Miss Piggy and Kermit the Frog has been subject to substantial coverage and commentary by the media. Throughout The Muppet Show's run, Miss Piggy's romantic pursuit for Kermit was consistently expressed. Kermit, however, constantly rebuffed Piggy's feelings. Eventually, in the films, Kermit began returning her affections and even (unwittingly) marries her in The Muppets Take Manhattan. However, subsequent events suggest that the marriage was simply fictional. It is mentioned by Miss Piggy, however, in The Muppets: A Celebration of 30 Years (1986) that Kermit was a happily married frog. This marriage isn't referenced in Muppets Most Wanted.

Miss Piggy and Kermit formally ended their romantic relationship on May 10, 1990. The decision was made by Jim Henson Productions and a publicity campaign titled "The Pig of the Nineties" was scheduled to follow. An autobiography of Piggy was expected to be published as part of the effort. However, shortly after the announcement on May 16, Jim Henson died and the campaign was dropped altogether. The two eventually resumed their relationship.

In 2015, Miss Piggy and Kermit ended their romantic relationship for a second time.

=== Performers ===
Frank Oz was Miss Piggy's principal performer from her early appearances on The Muppet Show until his departure from the cast in 2000; his last known performance as Piggy was an appearance on The Today Show. Oz's earliest known performance as Piggy was actually in a 1974 appearance on The Tonight Show. Richard Hunt occasionally performed Miss Piggy during the first season of The Muppet Show, alternating with Oz. In 2002, Eric Jacobson was cast as the new performer of Miss Piggy, and his first public debut as the character was performed via satellite at the 2001 MuppetFest. Jacobson has remained Piggy's principal performer since then, openly describing the role as "one of the most famous drag acts in the business."

During Oz's tenure as the character, other performers would step in. Jerry Nelson performed Piggy in 1974 for a brief appearance on Herb Alpert & the Tijuana Brass. Fran Brill performed Piggy for The Muppet Show: Sex and Violence, a pilot for The Muppet Show. Kevin Clash and Peter Linz puppeteered Piggy for most of the filming of Muppet Treasure Island and Muppets from Space, respectively, with Oz dubbing Piggy's voice in post-production. Victor Yerrid briefly performed Piggy in Muppets Ahoy!, a 2006 stage show for the Disney Cruise Line. In Muppet Babies, Piggy's voice was provided by voice actress Laurie O'Brien. Voice actor Hal Rayle provided her voice for a short-lived spin-off series, Little Muppet Monsters. Melanie Harrison voices Baby Piggy on the 2018 reboot of Muppet Babies.

== History ==
The first known appearance of Miss Piggy was on the Herb Alpert television special Herb Alpert and the TJB, broadcast on October 13, 1974, on ABC. Miss Piggy's voice was noticeably more demure and soft, singing with Herb, "I Can't Give You Anything but Love." The first draft of the puppet was an unnamed blonde, beady-eyed pig who appeared briefly in the 1975 pilot special The Muppet Show: Sex and Violence, in a sketch called "Return to Beneath the Planet of the Pigs." She was unnamed in that show, but by the time The Muppet Show began in 1976, she had assumed something resembling her classic look—a pig with large blue eyes, a flowing silver gown, satin white long gloves, blue sheer shawl, and a hopelessly romantic persona.

=== The Muppet Show ===
Miss Piggy began as a minor chorus pig on The Muppet Show but gradually developed into one of the central characters of the series, as the writers and producers of The Muppet Show recognized that a lovelorn pig could be more than a one-note running gag. She spawned a huge fad during the late 1970s and early 1980s and eclipsed Kermit and the other Muppets in popularity at that time, selling far more merchandise and writing a book entitled Miss Piggy's Guide to Life that was on the New York Times bestseller list for 29 weeks (from June 28, 1981 to January 24, 1982), reaching a peak of #4.

=== Films and television series ===
Miss Piggy has appeared in all the Muppet films and television series following The Muppet Show. In The Muppet Movie (1979), she has just won a beauty contest when she first meets Kermit and joins the Muppets. In The Great Muppet Caper (1981), Miss Piggy plays an aspiring fashion model who gets caught up in a screwball-comedy misunderstanding involving a gang of jewel thieves. 1984's The Muppets Take Manhattan ends with a climactic wedding between Kermit and Miss Piggy. In 1992's The Muppet Christmas Carol, Miss Piggy plays Mrs. Cratchit to Kermit's Bob Cratchit. Miss Piggy takes on the gender-flipped role of Benjamina Gunn in Muppet Treasure Island (1996), and she plays an eager news reporter in Muppets From Space (1999).

In The Muppets (2011), Miss Piggy is shown to be residing in Paris, having become the plus-size editor for Vogue after the Muppets disbanded, and after she left Kermit in Los Angeles. In Muppets Most Wanted (2014), having rejoined the Muppets on a global tour, she nearly marries Constantine in London, after he poses as Kermit.

In the TV series The Muppets, Miss Piggy hosts the late-night talk show Up Late with Miss Piggy.

In the 2020 Disney+ series, Muppets Now, Miss Piggy hosted a segment called Lifesty(le) with Miss Piggy.

A Miss Piggy film was revealed by Jennifer Lawrence during a podcast interview. Lawrence is producing it with Emma Stone while Cole Escola will write the script.

=== Other appearances ===
Miss Piggy has made multiple appearances in various Academy Awards ceremonies. In 1980, Miss Piggy and Johnny Carson introduced the performance of Best Original Song nominee "Rainbow Connection" from The Muppet Movie. In 1982, Miss Piggy and Kermit performed the nominated song, "The First Time It Happens" from The Great Muppet Caper, during the 54th Academy Awards Miss Piggy also appeared as a guest on Dolly Parton's Dolly show multiple times.

Miss Piggy had a spoof luxury brand featured on QVC, "Moi by Miss Piggy". The name had previously been used by a perfume released in 1998. She also appeared as a presenter at the 68th and 84th Academy Awards, in 1996 and 2012, respectively.

On Friday, March 15, 2013, Miss Piggy appeared on the UK telethon Comic Relief to reveal the cash total and introduce boy band One Direction. She was in Dream House 2013. On December 6, 2013, she performed 'Somethin' Stupid' alongside Robbie Williams at the London Palladium. In 2015, Miss Piggy received a Sackler Center First Award from the Elizabeth A. Sackler Center for Feminist Art at the Brooklyn Museum. An essay was subsequently released by The Muppets Studio (in the guise of Miss Piggy) for Time magazine, titled "Why I Am a Feminist Pig", explaining why she deserved the award.

On May 7, 2023, Miss Piggy and Kermit were invited to the Coronation Concert of King Charles III. She flirted with the host Hugh Bonneville.

She was interviewed by Michelle Miller on CBS Saturday Morning on May 25, 2024. On November 23, 2025, as part of a promotional campaign for their then-upcoming Muppet Show revival special, she appeared at the last stop of Sabrina Carpenter's Short n' Sweet Tour, where she was "arrested" as part of a recurring bit prior to the performance of "Juno".

=== Albums ===
- The Muppet Movie (soundtrack) (1979)
- The Great Muppet Caper (soundtrack) (1981)
- Miss Piggy's Aerobique Exercise Workout Album (1982)
- The Muppets Take Manhattan (soundtrack) (1984)
- The Muppet Christmas Carol (soundtrack) (1992)
- Muppet Treasure Island (soundtrack) (1996)
- It's a Very Merry Muppet Christmas Movie (2002)
- The Muppets' Wizard of Oz (soundtrack) (2005)
- A Muppets Christmas: Letters to Santa (soundtrack) (2008)
- The Muppets (soundtrack) (2011)
- Muppets Most Wanted (soundtrack) (2014)

=== Filmography ===
- The Muppet Show (1976–1981) (TV)
- The Muppet Movie (1979)
- The Great Muppet Caper (1981)
- The Fantastic Miss Piggy Show (1982) (TV)
- The Muppets Take Manhattan (1984)
- Muppet Babies (1984–1991) (TV) (voiced by Laurie O'Brien)
- The Muppet Christmas Carol (1992) – Appearance as Emily Cratchit
- Muppet Treasure Island (1996) – Appearance as Benjamina Gunn
- Muppets Tonight (1996–1998) (TV)
- Muppets from Space (1999)
- It's a Very Merry Muppet Christmas Movie (2002) (TV)
- The Muppets' Wizard of Oz (2005) (TV) – Appearance as Herself and the Wicked Witch of the West, Good Witch of the North, Glinda the Good Witch, Wicked Witch of the East
- A Muppets Christmas: Letters to Santa (2008) (TV)
- Studio DC: Almost Live (2008) (TV)
- The Muppets (2011)
- Lady Gaga and the Muppets Holiday Spectacular (2013) (TV)
- Muppets Most Wanted (2014)
- The Muppets (2015–2016) (TV)
- Muppet Babies (2018–2022) (TV) (voiced by Melanie Harrison))
- Muppets Now (2020) (Disney+) (TV)
- RuPaul's Drag Race All Stars (2021) (Paramount+) (TV)
- Muppets Haunted Mansion (2022) (Disney+) (TV)
- Holey Moley (2022) (Special Guest Appearance)
- The Muppet Show (2026) (TV)
