= Kenneth Ascher =

American jazz pianist, composer, and arranger (born 1944)

Kenny Ascher
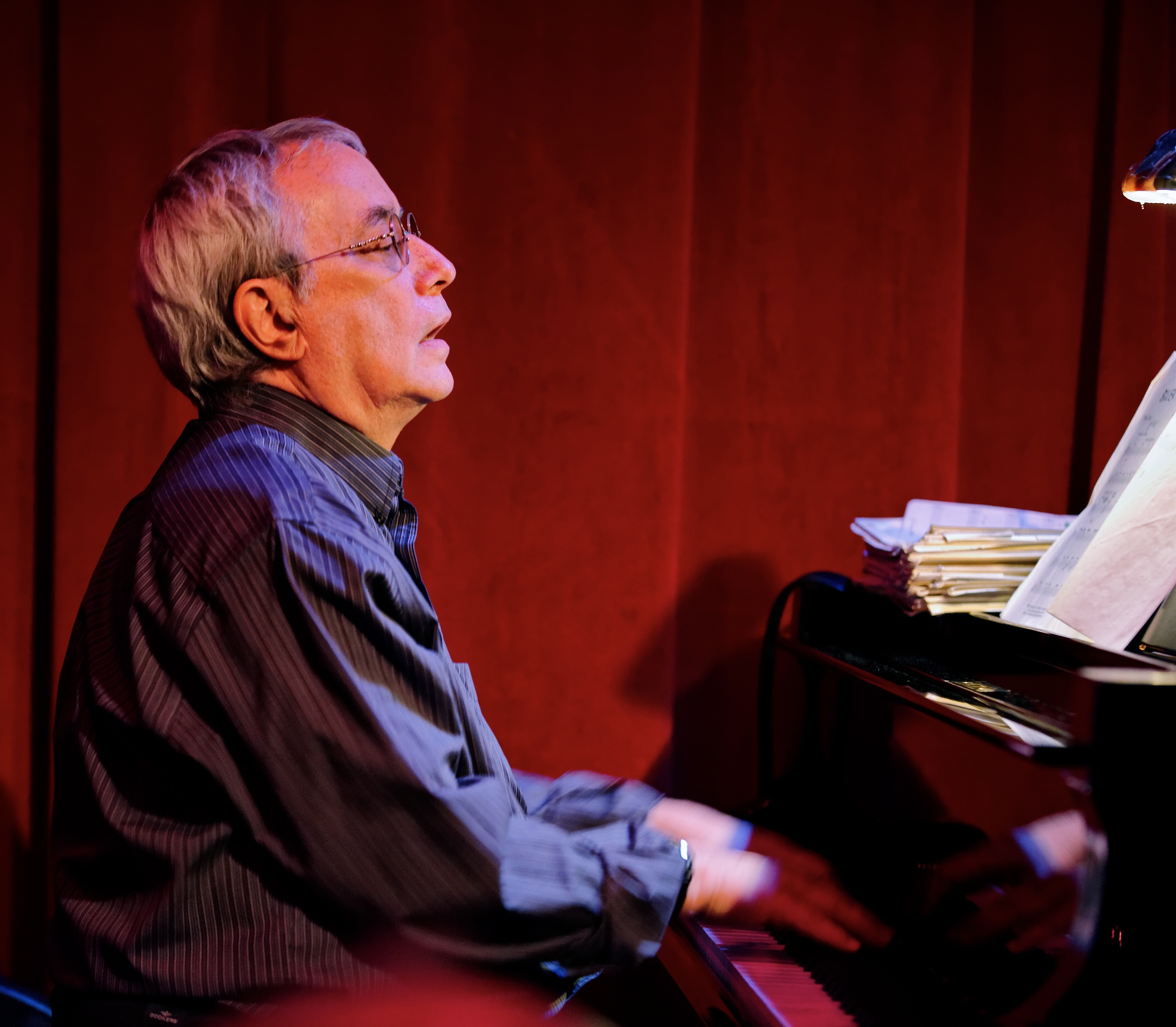
- Kenny Ascher

Background information
- Born: Kenneth Lee Ascher; October 26, 1944 (age 81); Washington, D.C.
- Genres: Big band, jazz, rock, film
- Occupations: Jazz pianist, composer, arranger, studio musician
- Instrument: piano

Kenneth Lee Ascher (born October 26, 1944, in Washington, D.C.) is an American jazz pianist, composer, and arranger who is active in jazz, rock, classical, and musical theater genres — in live venues, recording studios, and cinema production. With Paul Williams, he wrote the song "Rainbow Connection" for The Muppet Movie. Both Williams and Ascher received Oscar nominations for the 1979 Academy Awards for Best Original Song ("Rainbow Connection") and Best Original Score (The Muppet Movie Soundtrack). The song was also nominated for the Golden Globes for "Best Original Song" that same year. Ascher and Williams also wrote "You and Me Against the World", a top-10 hit for Helen Reddy in 1974.

== His work ==
In 1966, Ascher joined the Woody Herman Orchestra as arranger and pianist. Herman hired Ascher — on the advice of Frank Foster — to replace the departing Nat Pierce. Ascher has been a member of ASCAP since 1968.

He played piano on "Baby Now That I've Found You" recorded by Dan Schafer on Tortoise International Records, an RCA Records subsidiary released in 1977.

Ascher's work through the years has included keyboard parts and string arrangements on John Lennon's albums Mind Games, Walls and Bridges and Rock 'n' Roll and Yoko Ono's A Story, music for several songs from Barbra Streisand's remake of A Star Is Born (where he also served as music coordinator), and arrangements for portions of Meat Loaf's Bat Out of Hell (produced by Todd Rundgren). Ascher's own rendition of "Rainbow Connection" was featured in the closing credits of The Break-Up (starring Vince Vaughn and Jennifer Aniston). Ascher is the pianist with the Birdland Big Band, which performs Fridays from 5:15 to 7 at Birdland in New York City. The Birdland Big Band performs "Rainbow Connection", arranged by Lew Anderson.

== Selected compositions ==
- "Three for the Show", m & arr. Ascher (1960)
- "The White Rabbit", music & arr. Ascher (1960)
- "Scotch Mist", music & arr. by Ascher (1960)
- "Theme for Ken's Men", m & arr. Ascher (1960)
- "Retrospect", words & arr. Ascher (1960)
- "Typically April: A Revolutionary Musical", lyrics and music by Ascher (1966)
- "Stars and Sand" (1967)
- "Nightling" (1967)
- "April's in my Lady's Face" (1967)
- "Colors" (1967)
- "Dressed Up For a Dream" (1967)
- "These blues were made for cookin' " (1967)
- "Who can hear the nightingale?" (1967)
- "It seems different to me now" (1967)
- "Lullaby" (1967)
- "Last night's rain" (1967)
- "Laughin' Place" (1967)
- "Miss Fitz" (1967)
- "Maybe another spring" (1967)
- "Funny little girl" (1967)
- "Concerto for Trombone and Orchestra" (1968)
- "1968 Baltimore Colts Highlights" (ASCAP 1968)
- "Music for Orchestra" (Master's essay, Columbia University) (1968)
- "Bittersweet wild child", words by Donna Lee, music by Ascher (1968)
- "Cavettina" (1968)
- "Silent Partners", words Donna Lee, music Ascher (1968)
- "So I told it to the rain", words Donna Lee Levitt (Donna Lee), music by Ascher (1968)
- "You can't make this child cry", words Donna Lee Levitt, music by Ascher (1968)
- "Here I Go Again", words Donna Lee (Donna Lee Levitt), music by Ascher (1968)
- "My memory bank's been robbed", words Donna Lee (Donna Lee Levitt), music by Ascher (1968)
- "Leaf in the Wind", words and music by Lon Ritchie & Ascher (1969)
- "Omnibus", words & music by Ascher, Donna Lee & Joe Renzetti (1969)
- "One for Jim" (1970)
- "Another Kind of Blues" (1970)
- "Mosaics : a piece for guitar, string quartet and woodwind quartet with accompanying aesthetic commentary and description" (thesis for Columbia University) (1972)
- "Inspiration", by Paul Williams, Ascher (1973)
- "Bugaloo and Such" (1973)
- "Play, piper, play", words Donna Lee Levitt, music Ascher (1973)
- "Little Bit of Love", words & music by Paul Williams & Ascher (1974)
- "Lone Star", words & music by Paul Williams & Ascher (1974)
- "Loneliness", words & music Paul Williams & Ascher (1974)
- "Nilsson sings Newman", by Paul Williams, Ascher (1974)
- "Sad Song", words & music Paul Williams & Ascher (1974)
- "Sunday", words & music Paul Williams & Ascher (1974)
- "You Know Me", by Paul Williams, Ascher (1974)
- "She Sings for Free", words & music by Paul Williams & Ascher (1974, 2002)
- "You and Me Against the World", Paul Williams, Ascher (1974)
- "Makin' the same mistakes" (1974)
- "Isn't It Odd?" (1974)
- "Candlelight Dreamer" (1974)
- "Bein' a Movie Star" (1974)
- "Coming Undone" (1974)
- "With You", words Carole Bayer Sager, music Ascher (1975)
- "Don't you worry child", words Carole Bayer Sager, music Ascher (1975)
- From the 1976 film, A Star is Born
  1. "Watch Closely Now", Paul Williams, Ascher
  2. "Hellacious Acres", Paul Williams, Ascher
  3. "The Woman in the Moon", Paul Williams, Ascher
  4. "Finale: With One More Look at You/Watch Closely Now", Paul Williams, Ascher
- Run for life, vocal music by Ascher, lyrics by Albert Lerman (1978)
- From the 1979 film, The Muppet Movie
  1. "Rainbow Connection", words & music by Ascher and Paul Williams (1979)
  2. "Movin' Right Along", Paul Williams & Ascher (1979)
  3. "Never Before, Never Again!", – Miss Piggy, Paul Williams & Ascher (1979)
  4. "Never Before, Never Again!", – Instrumental, Paul Williams & Ascher (1979)
  5. "I Hope That Somethin' Better Comes Along!", – Kermit and Rowlf, Paul Williams & Ascher (1979)
  6. "Can You Picture That?", Paul Williams & Ascher (1979)
  7. "I Hope That Somethin' Better Comes Along!", – Instrumental
  8. "For Goodness Sake", Paul Williams, Ascher (1979)
  9. "Finale, the magic store", Paul Williams, Ascher (1979)
- For the Life of Me, Paul Williams, Ascher (1979)
- Making Friends, Waring & LaRosa; arr. Ascher (1979)
- Gift, Paul Williams, Ascher (1979)
- Little more like you, Paul Williams, Ascher (1979)
- Save me a dream, Paul Williams, Ascher (1979)
- Go Away
- Song for children of all ages, words and music by Ascher
- Kenny's ballad, music by Ascher (1980)
- Perfect Crime, music & lyrics by Ascher & John Barranco (1989)

== Selected discography ==
As leader

- Kenny Ascher, the Moog Machine, Switched-On Rock (played on Moog by Kenny) Columbia Records (1969)
- Kenny Ascher, Christmas Becomes Electric / The Moog (played on Moog by Kenny) Columbia Records (1970)

As arranger

- Woody Herman and the Thundering Herd, Concerto for Herd (Monterey Jazz Festival), Verve Records (September 17, 1967)

Woody's Boogaloo, arranged by Ascher

- Paul Williams, Here Comes Inspiration, (LP) (Ascher is producer, conductor, arranger, writer and pianist) A&M Records (1974)
- Airto Moreira, Virgin Land (Salvation, 1974)
- Helen Reddy, No Way To Treat A Lady, Capitol Records (1975)

B3 – You Know Me, by Ascher and Williams

- Lori Lieberman, Letting Go, RCA Victor, arrangements by Ascher (June 19, 1978)

As sideman or band member, on keyboards

- Howard Tate, Keep Cool (Don't Be a Fool), The Hit Factory (Oct 12, 1971)
- Tom Scott, Smoothin' On Down, Epic/Ode, New York City (July 1971)
- The J.B.s, "Food For Thought" People Records New York, 1971, (Ascher electric piano)
- Patti LaBelle, Moon Shadow (Ascher performs on tracks A3, A4, B2, B4), Warner Bros. Records (1972)
- Yvonne Elliman, Yvonne Elliman, Decca Records (1972)
- Bill Quateman, Bill Quatemen, (Ascher plays keyboards, produced the album, and wrote the string arrangements) CBS Records (1972)
- John Lennon, Mind Games (1973)
- Johnny Hartman, I've Been There (1973)
- Cecil Holmes, Cecil Homes Soulful Sounds, The – Black Motion Picture Experience, Buddah Records (1973)
- Bette Midler, Bette Midler, Atlantic Records (1973)
- Morgana King, New Beginnings, Paramount Records (1973)

A4 – The Sands of Time and Changes (Ascher, piano)
B2 – A Song for You (Ascher, piano)

- Mark Murphy, Mark II, Muse Records (1973)
- John Prine, Sweet Revenge, Atlantic Records (1973)
- Carly Simon, Hotcakes, Elektra Records (1974)
- Martha Reeves, Martha Reeves, MCA Records (1974)

B2 – Sweet Misery (Ascher plays clavinet and organ)

- Johnny Winter, John Dawson Winter III Columbia Records (1974)
- John Lennon, "Whatever Gets You thru the Night" (single) (Ascher plays clavinet) Apple Records (1974)
- John Lennon, Walls and Bridges (Ascher plays keyboards), Apple Records (1974)
- Paul Williams, A Little Bit of Love, by Ascher & Nice to Be Around, by Williams (Ascher is producer, conductor, arranger, writer and pianist) 45 RMP, Promo (1974)
- Paul Williams, A Little Bit of Love (Ascher is producer, conductor, arranger, writer and pianist), A&M Records (1974)

A1 – A Little Bit of Love, by Ascher
A4 – Sunday, by Ascher
B2 – She Sings for Free, by Ascher
B5 – Loneliness, by Ascher
B6 – Sad Song, by Ascher

- James Taylor, Walking Man, Warner Bros. Records (1974)
- Harry Nilsson, Pussy Cats (Ascher: piano, conductor, orchestration), RCA Victor (1974)
- Yoko Ono, Feeling the Space (recorded 1974, released 1997)
- Airto, Virgin Land, Salvation (Feb. 1974)

B4 – I Don't Have to Do What I Don't Want to Do (Ascher plays melletron on this track)

- Judy Collins, Judith, Elektra Records (1975)
- Merry Clayton, Keep Your Eye on the Sparrow, Ode Records (1975)
- John Lennon, Rock 'n' Roll (Ascher plays keyboards), Capitol Records (1975)
- Paul Simon, Still Crazy After All These Years (Ascher plays organ), Warner Bros. Records (1975)
- Gladys Knight & The Pips, 2nd Anniversary (Ascher plays keyboards) (1975)

B1 – You and Me Against the World, arr Don Hannah, written by Ascher and Williams

- John Tropea, The Jingle, West Orange, New Jersey, Marlin (1975)
- Frankie Valli, Closeup, Private Stock Records (1975)
- Dr. John, Hollywood Be Thy Name, United Artists Records (1975)
- Nanette Natal, The Beginning, New York, Evolution (date unknown, prob late 1970s)
- Leslie West, The Leslie West Band Phantom Records, distributed by RCA Records, and later, ESP Management Inc. (1975)
- Barbra Streisand and Kris Kristofferson, A Star Is Born (soundtrack), Columbia Records (1976)

A1 – Watch Closely Now, by Ascher
A5 – Hellacious Acres, by Ascher
B1 – The Woman in the Moon, by Ascher and Williams
B4 – Finale: With One More Look At You / Watch Closely Now, by Ascher and Williams

- Paul Williams, Classics, A&M Records (1977)

A2 – You and Me Against the World, by Ascher and Williams
A4 – Loneliness, by Ascher and Williams
B2 – With One More Look at You, by Ascher and Williams

(Ascher produced tracks: A2, A4, B4, B5)

- Phoebe Snow, Never Letting Go, Columbia Records (Ascher performs on keyboards and orchestrates on selections) (1977)
- Frankie Valli, Lady Put the Light Out, Private Stock Records (1977)
- Meat Loaf, Bat Out of Hell, Epic Records (1977) (RIAA 14xPlatinum Certified)

A3 – Heaven Can Wait (string arrangement by Ascher)
B1 – Two Out of Three Ain't Bad (string arrangement by Ascher)

- Tom Scott, Blow It Out, Ode Records (1977)

A2 – Smoothin' On Down (Ascher plays clavinet on this track)

- Maynard Ferguson, Conquistador, Columbia Records (1977)
- The Muppets, Movin' Right Along, (45 RPM) CBS Records Australia (1979)
- The Muppets, The Muppet Movie Original Soundtrack Recording (Ascher co-writes, co-arranges, and performs on keyboards), Columbia Records (1979)
- Perry Como, Perry Como, RCA Victor (1980)
- Earl Klugh, Late Night Guitar
- Yoko Ono, Walking On Thin Ice (45 RPM), Geffen Records (1981)

B – It Happened (Ascher, keyboards on the flipside only)

- Marvin Stamm, Stammpede, New York, Palo Alto (1983)
- Peter Dean, Radio, Inner City Records, New York (1984)
- Pat Williams' New York Band, 10th Avenue, New York, Soundwings (Dec. 1986)
- Warren Bernhardt, Hands On (Kenny performs on the 2nd and 4th works) (CD) (1987)
- Dr. John, Mos' Scocious: The Dr. John Anthology, Rhino Records (1993)

2-15 – Back by the River (Ascher plays keyboard)

- David Matthews Orchestra, Furuhata Jazz in N.Y., New York, WEA (Japan) (1997)
- The Wiz (Original Soundtrack), MCA Records (1997)
- Gary LeMel, Moonlighting (Ascher is assistant conductor), Skylark Atlantic 83178-2 (1998)
- Alex Donner, White Tie, New York & Astoria, Black Tie Records (Mar 10, 1998-Sep 8, 2000)
- Patti LaBelle, Labelle, Wounded Bird Records (2000)

1 – Morning Much Better, Ascher – piano
6 – Running Out of Fools – If You Gotta Make a Fool of Somebody, Ascher – piano
10 – Time, Ascher – piano
11 – When the Sun Comes Shining Through (The Ladder), Ascher – piano

- Wally Dunbar, Everything in Time, Nardis Consolidated Artists CAP953 (2000)
- Nelson Foltz, The Longing Hours, New York & Northvale, N.J., Syberdelix (2001)
- Jane Monheit, In the Sun, New York, N Coded Music (March–June 2002)
- Jane Monheit, Live at the Rainbow Room, N Coded Music (September 23, 2002)
- Scott Whitfield Jazz Orchestra East, Live at "Birdland", Summit Records (March 10, 2003)
- Clay Aiken, Merry Christmas with Love, RCA Records (2004)
- Susan Robkin, Surfacing to Breathe (May 2004)
- Don Payne (bass), Rhapsodic Echoes, (Ascher plays piano on tracks 5 & 8) Recycled Notes Music Company Archived 2011-07-25 at the Wayback Machine (May 5, 2004)

5 – Unscheduled Departures
8 – M.A.P.S. (Bob Mann, Kenny Ascher, Don Payne, Allen Schwartzberg)

- Scott Whitfield, Diamonds for Nat, New York, Summit Records (April 12 & 13, 2005)
- Rod Stewart, Thanks for the Memory: The Great American Songbook, Volume IV, J-Records (Oct. 18, 2005)
- Steve Tyrell, The Disney Standards, Walt Disney Records (2006)

10 – When She Loved Me (Ascher, keyboards)
14 – Baby Mine, (Ascher, keyboards & string arrangements)

- Steve Tyrell, Back to Bacharach, Koch Records (2008)

4 – One Less Bell to Answer (piano, Ascher; arr Bacharach; strings arr, Ascher)
11 – Close to You (Ascher, piano)
12 – A House is Not a Home (Ascher, piano)

- The Birdland Big Band, The Lew Anderson Tribute Concert (live), I.E.G. Inc. (June 1, 2007)
- Tommy Igoe and the Birdland Big Band, Live from New York (DVD) I.E.G. Inc. (Jan 1, 2009)

OCLC 271753259)

- Andy Farber and His Orchestra, This Could be the Start of Something Big (2009)
- Tommy Igoe and the Birdland Big Band, Eleven (11-11-11)
- Ron Sunshine "Bring It Home" Rondette Jazz (November 20, 2015) Ascher piano.

== Awards & award nominations ==
Awards

- 1976 — Golden Globe for Best Original Score, A Star is Born, 34th Golden Globe Awards, Kenny Ascher & Paul Williams

Nominations

- 1978 — Anthony Asquith Award nomination for Film Music, A Star is Born, British Academy of Film and Television Arts, Kenny Ascher
- 1979 — Golden Globe nomination for Best Original Song, Rainbow Connection, 37th Golden Globe Awards, Kenny Ascher & Paul Williams
- 1979 — Academy Award nomination for Best Original Song Score and Its Adaptation or Adaptation Score, The Muppet Movie, 52nd Academy Awards, Kenny Ascher & Paul Williams
- 1979 — Academy Award nomination for Best Original Song, The Muppet Movie, 52nd Academy Awards, Kenny Ascher & Paul Williams

Past Grammy Nominations
| Nominee | Genre | Category | Title | Performing Artist |
|---|---|---|---|---|
17th Annual (for recordings released between Oct 16, 1973, and Oct 15, 1974); March 1, 1975
| Paul Williams; Kenneth Ascher | Songwriters Award | Song of the Year | You and Me Against the World | Helen Reddy |
20th Annual (for recordings released between Oct 1, 1976, and Sep 30, 1977); February 23, 1977
| Kenny Ascher, Alan Bergman, Marilyn Bergman, Rupert Holmes, Leon Russell, Barbra Streisand, Donna Weiss, Paul Williams, Kenny Loggins | Composers and Arrangers | Best Album of an Original Score; Written for a Motion Picture or a TV Special | A Star is Born | Motion Picture |
22nd Annual (for recordings released between Oct 1, 1978, and Sep 30, 1979); February 27, 1980
| Paul Williams; Kenneth Ascher | Composers and Arrangers | Best Album of an Original Score; Written for a Motion Picture or a TV Special | The Muppet Movie | Motion Picture |

== Critically acclaimed live performances ==
- Feb 1973 — Ascher played piano with Marvin Stamm at Sam's Jazz Upstairs (1220 2nd Avenue at 64th St., New York City): Bob Dougherty (bass) and Ronnie Zito on drums. Stamm said, "In 21 years of playing music, this is the best group of musicians I've ever been with." Reflecting on that statement, John Stuart Wilson (1913–2002), longtime jazz critic for The New York Times, said, "That might have sounded like a fatuous statement leaders often make in introducing their musicians to a jazz club audience. In this case, however, it was completely believable because Mr. Stamm's quartet is the most exciting group that has turned-up in New York for a long time."
- May 1973 — Kenny Ascher Trio, Sundays, Jimmy Weston's, 131 E 54th St., New York City
- Jan 13, 2009 — Mike Berkowitz and The New Gene Krupa Orchestra, Iridium
- Dec 2000 — Michael Feinstein with a small swing band led by Kenny Ascher, the Regency, New York City
- July 2001 — Jay Leonhart with Kenny Ascher and Michael Leonhart, July 13–21, Oak Room of the Algonquin Hotel

== Jingle writing ==
Ascher has composed (or co-composed) jingles for:

- The 1968 Baltimore Colts
- FedEx
1. Applause
2. Gotcha
3. Larry
4. Mr. Calm
- Heineken
1. The Beer
2. Combined
- General Electric
1. Brilliant Idea/ GE Brings Good Things to Life
2. Cooking
- Pizza Hut (Class Act)
- NFL
- Campbell's Soup – Never Underestimate the Power of Soup campaign
1. Never Underestimate
2. Canned Chef
3. Hockey
4. Makes Itself
5. Red Dress
6. Snowman
7. Stay Young
8. Storm Radio – Winter
9. Superhero
10. Superman
11. Tennis Anyone?
12. Wild Ride
- Frigidaire (Nightfeeding)
- Diet Pepsi (Uh-Huh Blues – You've Got The Right One, Baby, with Ray Charles)
- American Dairy (Warm All Over)
- Coors Brewing Company
1. Herman Joseph – Polo, revised arr by Kenny Ascher (1981)
2. Herman Joseph – Tennis, comp. & arr. by Kenny Ascher (1981)
3. Sailboat music and arr. by Kenneth Ascher (1980)
4. Billiards, music and arr. by Kenneth Ascher (1980)
- National Airlines (Generic/scope), music by Ken Ascher (1978)
- Ford Motors (National Test Drive)

Many of Ascher's jingle compositions were (i) produced by Sunday Productions (Hilary Jay Lipsitz, born 1933, president), (ii) published by Ahoskie Music, Inc. (Hilary Jay Lipsitz, president), and (iii) licensed by ASCAP.

== Academic education ==
Ascher holds three diplomas from Columbia University:

- 1966 — Bachelor of Arts (music composition), Columbia College, Columbia University
- 1968 — Master of Arts (music composition), Graduate School of Arts & Sciences, Columbia University
- 1971 — Doctor of Musical Arts (music composition), School of the Arts, Columbia University

While at Columbia, Ascher studied composition with Otto Luening, Jack Beeson, and Vladimir Ussachevsky and piano with William Albert Beller (1900–1986). Ascher graduated from William F. Dykes High School in Atlanta, as valedictorian, and entered Columbia College, Columbia University on a math scholarship. In 1966, while in college, the Kenny Ascher Quintet performed live in WKCR's Stone Soup at midnight.
