= Fozzie Bear =

Muppet character

- The Muppets character
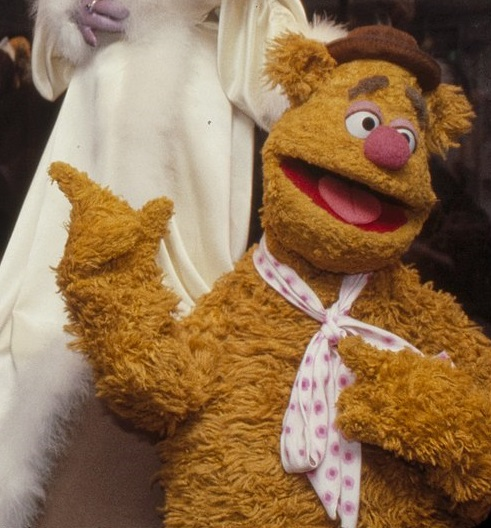
- Fozzie Bear puppet photographed in 1979
- First appearance: The Muppet Show (1976)
- Created by: Jim Henson; Jerry Juhl
- Performed by: Frank Oz (1976–2000); Eric Jacobson (2002–present)

In-universe information
- Species: Muppet brown bear
- Gender: Male
- Occupation: Stand-up comedian
- Family: Emily Bear (mother)
- Nationality: American

Fozzie Bear is a Muppet character from the sketch comedy television series The Muppet Show, best known as the insecure and comedically fruitless stand-up comic. Fozzie is an anthropomorphic orange-brown bear who often wears a brown pork pie hat and a pink and white polka dot necktie. The character debuted on The Muppet Show, as the series' resident comedian, a role where he uses the catchphrase "Wocka wocka!" to indicate that he had completed a joke. He was often the target of ridicule, particularly from balcony hecklers Statler and Waldorf. Fozzie was performed by Frank Oz until 2000, after which Eric Jacobson became the character's principal performer.

== History ==
Fozzie Bear was specifically created to act as a "second banana" to Kermit the Frog. He was built around the concept of a comedian in the style of Red Skelton and Milton Berle. Designed by Michael K. Frith, the origin of Fozzie's name has been traditionally thought to be a pun of performer Frank Oz's name (F.Oz). It was also believed that the character was named after Al Fuzzie, the mascot of the Alpha Xi Delta sorority in the mid-1970s; Henson's wife, Jane, was a member of the sorority. However, Oz confirmed on Twitter in 2018 that Fozzie was actually named after Franz "Faz" Fazakas, a Muppet workshop designer. Fazakas created the original puppet's ear-wiggling effects.

Fozzie Bear was originally Oz's main character. The popularity of Miss Piggy overtook Fozzie's, but he remained popular. One of his largest roles ever was in A Muppet Family Christmas, where he took all of his friends to his mother's farm for Christmas.

In 1988, Fozzie was featured in the VHS release Hey, You're as Funny as Fozzie Bear, part of the Jim Henson Company's "Play-Along Video" series. In the video, Fozzie instructs young viewers in various comedy techniques. The concept for the "Play-Along Video" came from Jim Henson's idea that television could be used as an interactive medium and encourage children's creativity.

During the 1990s, his roles became much smaller, due to the fact that Oz had turned his focus to directing non-Muppet films and reduced his time with the Muppets. Fozzie was a supporting character in The Muppet Christmas Carol, Muppet Treasure Island, and Muppets from Space, and appeared in six episodes of Muppets Tonight. However, he returned to prominence when Eric Jacobson took over in 2002, beginning with It's a Very Merry Muppet Christmas Movie, in which Fozzie was the focus of a number of scenes.

An original puppet is kept in the teddy bear museum in Newby Hall near Ripon, UK.

=== Performers ===
Frank Oz first performed Fozzie in 1976 on The Muppet Show. He remained Fozzie's main performer until his departure from the cast in 2000. In 2002, Eric Jacobson became Fozzie's main performer and has continued to perform the character since then.

Kevin Clash and John Kennedy puppeteered Fozzie for much of the production of Muppet Treasure Island and Muppets from Space, respectively, with Oz dubbing Fozzie's voice. Victor Yerrid performed Fozzie for a 2006 Disney Cruise Line stage show, Muppets Ahoy!. Voice actor Greg Berg provided Fozzie's voice for the Saturday morning cartoon Muppet Babies, as well as its short-lived spin-off, Little Muppet Monsters. In the reboot of Muppet Babies, Fozzie is voiced by Eric Bauza.

== Characterization ==
=== Origins and personality ===
Frank Oz has described Fozzie as "desperately insecure" and cites the character's close friendship with Kermit the Frog to be essential to his core. Oz elaborated that "with Kermit, he would want to find a way to be funny. That's not altruistic for Fozzie. He's not trying to make people feel better. He just wants to be a great comedian. But the main thing is that he would need to be with Kermit. He feels alone without Kermit."

Being best friends, Fozzie and Kermit have frequently been paired together in many movies, books, and specials. In The Muppet Movie, Fozzie is the first Muppet that Kermit meets on his journey. After Fozzie's unsuccessful comedy performance at the El Sleezo Cafe, Kermit invited Fozzie to come to Hollywood with him. The two friends sing the duet "Movin' Right Along" in the film. Several episodes show Fozzie as dedicated to Kermit, usually responding to his instructions with a chipper "Yes sir". On those rare occasions when Kermit must be away from the theater, he invariably leaves Fozzie in charge of the show, although he equally invariably regrets it (due to the bear's lack of skill as a showrunner). In The Great Muppet Caper, Fozzie and Kermit are portrayed as twin brothers.

Fozzie's mother, Emily Bear (performed by Jerry Nelson), appeared in A Muppet Family Christmas special. To Fozzie's surprise, she was friends with Statler and Waldorf, despite the heckling they inflict on him. In The Muppet Movie, Fozzie makes reference to his uncle, whose Studebaker he traded in while his uncle was hibernating.

=== On The Muppet Show ===
In the first season of The Muppet Show, the show's opening featured Fozzie telling a joke during an instrumental portion of the theme song. Fozzie was often featured in a sketch where he did a comedy monologue, in which Statler and Waldorf would heckle him (he was their favorite victim). In the second season, Fozzie's comedy routines often had gimmicks such as ventriloquism or performing on roller skates. As the series progressed, he did fewer comedy routines, becoming more involved in the show as a whole. He also performed as a magician occasionally.

Occasionally, Fozzie uses Jewish humor on the show, a nod to Frank Oz's Jewish heritage and the Borscht Belt comics that were widely popular in the mid-20th century. For example, Fozzie's "The Telephone Pole Bit" in a 1976 episode guest starring Paul Williams included a reference to Frank Oz's Polish Jewish father, and while practicing a magic act in a 1980 episode guest starring Doug Henning, Fozzie pulls a rabbi out of a hat.

Though his main job was to be the show's comedian, he has had a number of other roles on The Muppet Show. He sang and danced in many musical numbers, and frequently acted in sketches (including his recurring sketch Bear On Patrol where he plays an unlucky police officer). He also often helps backstage.

In a 1979 episode guest starring Kenny Rogers, Fozzie and his mother Emily do a performance of Knees Up Mother Brown, in which he sings and Emily dances as Mother Brown in the chorus.

In a 1976 episode guest starring Candice Bergen, Fozzie annoys Kermit the Frog with a running gag, delivering a number of pun items, such as a "wire" and a "letter" for Kermit which turned out to be a clothes wire and the letter R, respectively.

Another running gag is Fozzie's hat—as a bear, he is covered with fur all over. However, upon removing his hat, his head shape is modeled on the pate of a bald headed man—thus, the juxtaposition of being both furred and bald simultaneously. This was referenced in the 2011 film The Muppets, where he saw an old picture of himself at the Muppet Theater and ridiculed the "'80s haircut" he sported back then.

Fozzie was also frequently teamed up with Rowlf the Dog. In a 1977 episode guest starring Juliet Prowse, Fozzie plays a western bandit to Rowlf's role as a western hero. Fozzie also appeared in two Veterinarian's Hospital sketches, in which Rowlf starred as Dr. Bob.

In a 1978 episode guest starring Elton John, Rowlf learns that Fozzie could play the piano, and they play the piano together in a performance of "An English Country Garden". Rowlf has also played back-up to Fozzie's rendition of "Hi-Diddle-Dee-Dee (An Actor's Life for Me)" that was broadcast in two 1978 episodes (guest starring Pearl Bailey, and Kris Kristofferson & Rita Coolidge, respectively) and "I've Got Rhythm" in a 1980 episode guest starring Alan Arkin. The young incarnations of Fozzie and Rowlf are also frequently paired together on Muppet Babies.

== Filmography ==
- The Muppet Show (1976–1981) (TV)
- The Muppet Movie (1979)
- The Great Muppet Caper (1981)
- The Muppets Take Manhattan (1984)
- Muppet Babies (1984–1991) (TV) (voiced by Greg Berg)
- Muppet*Vision 3D (1991)
- The Muppet Christmas Carol (1992) – Appearance as Fozziwig
- Muppet Treasure Island (1996) – Appearance as Squire Trelawney
- Muppets Tonight (1996–1998) (TV)
- Muppets from Space (1999)
- It's a Very Merry Muppet Christmas Movie (2002) (TV)
- The Muppets' Wizard of Oz (2005) (TV) – Appearance as Himself and the Cowardly Lion
- A Muppets Christmas: Letters to Santa (2008) (TV)
- Studio DC: Almost Live (2008) (TV)
- The Muppets (2011)
- Lady Gaga and the Muppets Holiday Spectacular (2013) (TV)
- Muppets Most Wanted (2014)
- The Muppets (2015–2016) (TV)
- Muppet Babies (2018–2022) (TV) (voiced by Eric Bauza)
- Big City Greens (2019) (TV) – Appearance as the voice of Dr. Enamel in "Hurty Tooth"
- Muppets Now (2020) (TV)
- Muppets Haunted Mansion (2021) (TV) – Appearance as Gauzey the Hatbox Bear (a parody of the Hatbox Ghost)
- The Muppet Show (2026) (TV)

== Appearances in popular culture ==
=== In television and film ===
- In the comedy-musical A Very Potter Senior Year, which parodies the popular Harry Potter franchise and stars Glee's Darren Criss in the role of Harry Potter, Fozzie Bear is comically voted to be the new Head Boy at Hogwarts, due to a prank pulled off by the majority of the school's student body.
- Fozzie was featured on the #10 Valvoline Pontiac of Mike Wallace (who was filling in for the car's regular driver Johnny Benson) in the 2002 Tropicana 400 in an advertising campaign in which he and his fellow Muppets were featured on a select few race cars.
- Fozzie also appeared alongside his fellow Muppets in the Halloween 2011 episode of WWE Raw, where he and Gonzo encountered Jack Swagger, Dolph Ziggler, and Vickie Guerrero backstage.
- In the 2007 DreamWorks Animation film Bee Movie, Fozzie is mentioned along with several other fictional bears when Barry, the main character, states that it is inappropriate for bears to be used to advertise honey.
- Fozzie appears in three episodes of Family Guy; at the end of "The Tan Aquatic with Steve Zissou" (voiced by Michael Clarke Duncan), "Baby Not on Board", and "And I'm Joyce Kinney". He is also referenced in "Blue Harvest", in the form of Brian (as Chewbacca) using his "Wocka Wocka" catchphrase.
- In one episode of Sesame Street, Baby Bear remarks that "Fozzie" is a terrible name for a bear.
- Fozzie was a contestant on the May 24, 2016, episode of @midnight and beat Kristen Schaal and John Hodgman.

=== Other ===
- German comedian Harald Schmidt had a regular appearance as "Fozzi-Bär" (an allusion to a vulgar German word for the female reproductive organ) in his 1990s show Schmidteinander.
- Nail polish company OPI created a collection inspired by The Muppets in 2011. In that collection, Warm and Fozzie is a color that is bronze with shimmery dark gold tones.
- Rap artist Waka Flocka Flame has been known to wear a Fozzie Bear diamond and gold charm on his chain during performances and music videos.
- Fozzie Bear appears in the mobile game Disney Heroes: Battle Mode.
