= Gustafer Yellowgold =

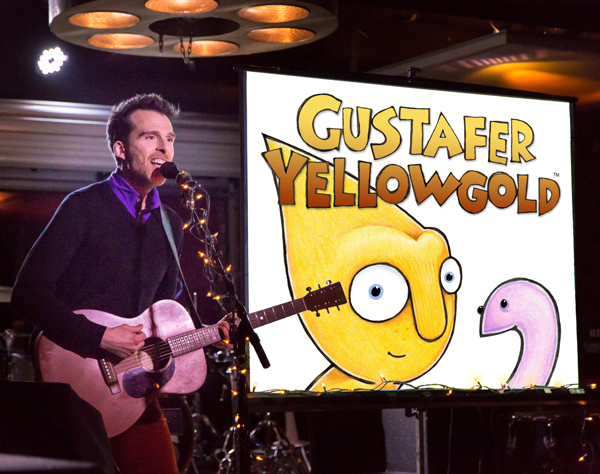
Morgan Taylor performs Gustafer Yellowgold’s Show

Gustafer Yellowgold is a fictional character created by Grammy-nominated American songwriter and illustrator, Morgan Taylor. Gustafer is the main character in a series of audio books, hand-drawn music videos brought to life in both live concerts and its DVD/CD series.

In 2018, Audible released "I'm From The Sun - The Gustafer Yellowgold Story", a musical audiobook written and narrated by Morgan Taylor with music produced by Pat Sansone of Wilco and The Autumn Defense. "I'm From The Sun" chronicles Gustafer's early years as a sweet young sunling dealing with the stress of the holidays, bullies, and his family’s raisin business. "I'm From The Sun - The Gustafer Yellowgold Story" was an Audible.com Best Selling Children's Audiobook. Two follow-ups were released - "Minnesota Chronicles" in 2019, and "A Cooler World" in 2021, respectively.

The illustrated music video collection chronicles the exploits of Gustafer, a friendly yellow alien who has come to Earth from the Sun to live out an explorer's life in an anthropomorphized version of the Minnesota woods. The live concerts featured Morgan Taylor performing the songs next to a large video screen containing his moving illustrations.

The property is categorized as children's entertainment, but like Jim Henson's Muppets and Dr. Seuss's work it has adult cross-over appeal, as Taylor's live show opened for popular alternative music acts such as Wilco and The Polyphonic Spree. The Gustafer Yellowgold Show performed over 1,500 live concerts to an ever-growing following across the United States.

Taylor died of sepsis at age 52. His death was announced on August 12, 2022. A tribute episode of 13 Under 13 aired on SiriusXM's Kids Place Live on August 19, 2022. In 2023, concerts titled A Celebration of Gustafer Yellowgold were held in New York and Seattle, and included guest performers Norah Jones, Matt Wilson (Trip Shakespeare), David Poe, The Pop Ups, Joe Mailander (The Okee Dokee Brothers), Danny Weinkauf (They Might Be Giants), Jesse Harris, Justin Roberts, Frances England, Chris Ballew, Recess Monkey, and Taylor's wife Rachel Loshak.

== History ==
The project began in late 2003 as a series of small, illustrated picture books. The illustrations for the books were soon animated and released as a DVD entitled Gustafer Yellowgold's Wide Wild World in March 2005 by Apple-Eye Productions, a company started by Taylor and his wife Rachel Loshak. Taylor began performing the concerts that same summer in small venues in New York City's Lower East Side. By 2008, Taylor was listed as "Best Kids' Performer" by New York Magazine. In March 2008 "Gustafer Yellowgold's Mellow Sensation" began its 22-week Off-Broadway run at Daryl Roth's DR2 theater in Manhattan.

Prior to his work on the Gustafer Yellowgold project, Morgan Taylor was a multi-instrumentalist for Wilco members John Stirratt and Pat Sansone's band, The Autumn Defense on their 2004 Circles tour, co-wrote music for Lisa Loeb's 2012 album No Fairy Tales and has had a successful career as a sound and recording engineer working with Joseph Arthur, Jon Brion, Norah Jones, Regina Spektor, Rufus Wainwright, Duncan Sheik, Rich Robinson and others.

A native of Dayton, Ohio, Morgan Taylor moved to New York City in 1999, honing his songwriting skills while concurrently becoming a successful sound engineer. A self-taught cartoonist raised on MAD Magazine and Marvel Comics, Taylor began drawing what would become the Gustafer Yellowgold videos as a picture book project in winter 2004, during breaks of touring as the multi-instrumentalist for The Autumn Defense. Taylor played the first live Gustafer Yellowgold concert with music and moving images in the summer of 2005 while on tour in Seoul, Korea. His DVD/CD sets, Gustafer Yellowgold's Have You Never Been Yellow? and Gustafer Yellowgold's Wide Wild World are NAPPA Gold Award winners and were honored by the Kids First! Film and Video Festival. “Mint Green Bee” from Gustafer Yellowgold's Wide Wild World was a Grand Prize Winner in the John Lennon Songwriting Contest. The seventh full-length CD/DVD release Gustafer Yellowgold's Dark Pie Concerns was nominated for a Grammy Award for Best Children's Album in 2015.

A posthumous compilation album titled Best of Gustafer Yellowgold was released as a double album of yellow vinyl on September 8, 2023. The release included one LP of songs voted for by fans, and a second LP containing covers of Gustafer Yellowgold songs by artists including Frances England, Justin Roberts, Parker Jacobs, Chris Ballew, The Okee Dokee Brothers, Recess Monkey, Gail Ann Dorsey, and Morgan Taylor's son Ridley Loshak-Taylor.

== Discography ==
=== Studio albums ===
| Title | Album details |
|---|---|
| Gustafer Yellowgold's Wide Wild World | Released: 2005; Label: Apple-Eye Productions; Formats: CD/DVD |
| Gustafer Yellowgold's Have You Never Been Yellow? | Released: 2007; Label: Apple-Eye Productions; Formats: CD/DVD |
| Gustafer Yellowgold's Mellow Fever | Released: March 17, 2009; Label: Apple-Eye Productions; Formats: CD/DVD |
| Gustafer Yellowgold's Infinity Sock | Released: March 1, 2011; Label: Apple-Eye Productions; Formats: CD/DVD, digital download |
| Gustafer Yellowgold's Year in the Day | Released: April 3, 2012; Label: Apple-Eye Productions; Formats: CD/DVD, digital download |
| Gustafer Yellowgold's Wisdom Tooth of Wisdom | Released: September 23, 2014; Label: Apple-Eye Productions; Formats: CD/DVD, digital download |
| Gustafer Yellowgold's Dark Pie Concerns | Released: September 4, 2015; Label: Apple-Eye Productions; Formats: CD/DVD, digital download |
| Gustafer Yellowgold's Brighter Side | Released: September 8, 2017; Label: Apple-Eye Productions; Formats: CD, digital download |
| I'm From the Sun (Music from the Audible Original) | Released: August 23, 2019; Label: Apple-Eye Productions; Formats: digital download |
| Minnesota Chronicles | Released: September 24, 2021; Label: Apple-Eye Productions; Formats: digital download |

=== Audiobooks ===
| Title | Album details |
|---|---|
| I'm From the Sun - The Gustafer Yellowgold Story | Released: October 4, 2018; Label: Audible Original; Formats: CD, digital download |
| Minnesota Chronicles - The Gustafer Yellowgold Story: Volume 2 | Released: September 19, 2019; Label: Audible Original; Formats: digital download |
| A Cooler World - The Gustafer Yellowgold Story Pt. 3 | Released: August 19, 2021; Label: Audible Original; Formats: digital download |

=== Compilations ===
| Title | Album details |
|---|---|
| Best of Gustafer Yellowgold | Released: September 8, 2023; Label: Apple-Eye Productions; Formats: LP, digital download |

=== Singles ===
| Title | Year | Album |
|---|---|---|
| "Slim Gets In 'Em" | 2011 | Gustafer Yellowgold's Infinity Sock |
| "Pancake Smackdown" | 2012 | Gustafer Yellowgold's Year in the Day |
| "Four Leaved Clover" | 2012 | Gustafer Yellowgold's Year in the Day |
| "Rock Melon" | 2013 | Gustafer Yellowgold's Dark Pie Concerns |
| "Cakenstein" | 2014 | Gustafer Yellowgold's Dark Pie Concerns |
| "I Can't Feel My Face" | 2014 | Gustafer Yellowgold's Wisdom Tooth of Wisdom |
| "Gravy Insane" | 2015 | Gustafer Yellowgold's Dark Pie Concerns |
| "Hey, Eyeball!" | 2016 | Non-album single |
| "Hot Nights (feat. Pat Sansone)" | 2017 | Gustafer Yellowgold's Brighter Side |
| "I Got This (Probably)" | 2019 | I'm From the Sun (Music from the Audible Original) |
| "My Best Friend is Electric" | 2021 | Non-album single |

=== Guest appearances ===
List of non-single guest appearances, showing year released and album name
| Title | Year | Other artist(s) | Album |
|---|---|---|---|
| "Penguin Day" | 2010 | —N/a | Many Hands: Family Music for Haiti |
| "Space Oddity" | 2016 | The Pop Ups | Let All the Children Boogie: A Tribute to David Bowie |
