= Freelon =

Freelon is a surname. Notable people with the surname include:

- Allan Randall Freelon (1895–1960), American artist
- Nnenna Freelon (born 1954), American jazz singer
- Philip Freelon (1953–2019), American architect
- Pierce Freelon, American academic
- Solomon Freelon (born 1951), American football player
