= Grammy Award for Best Children's Music Album =

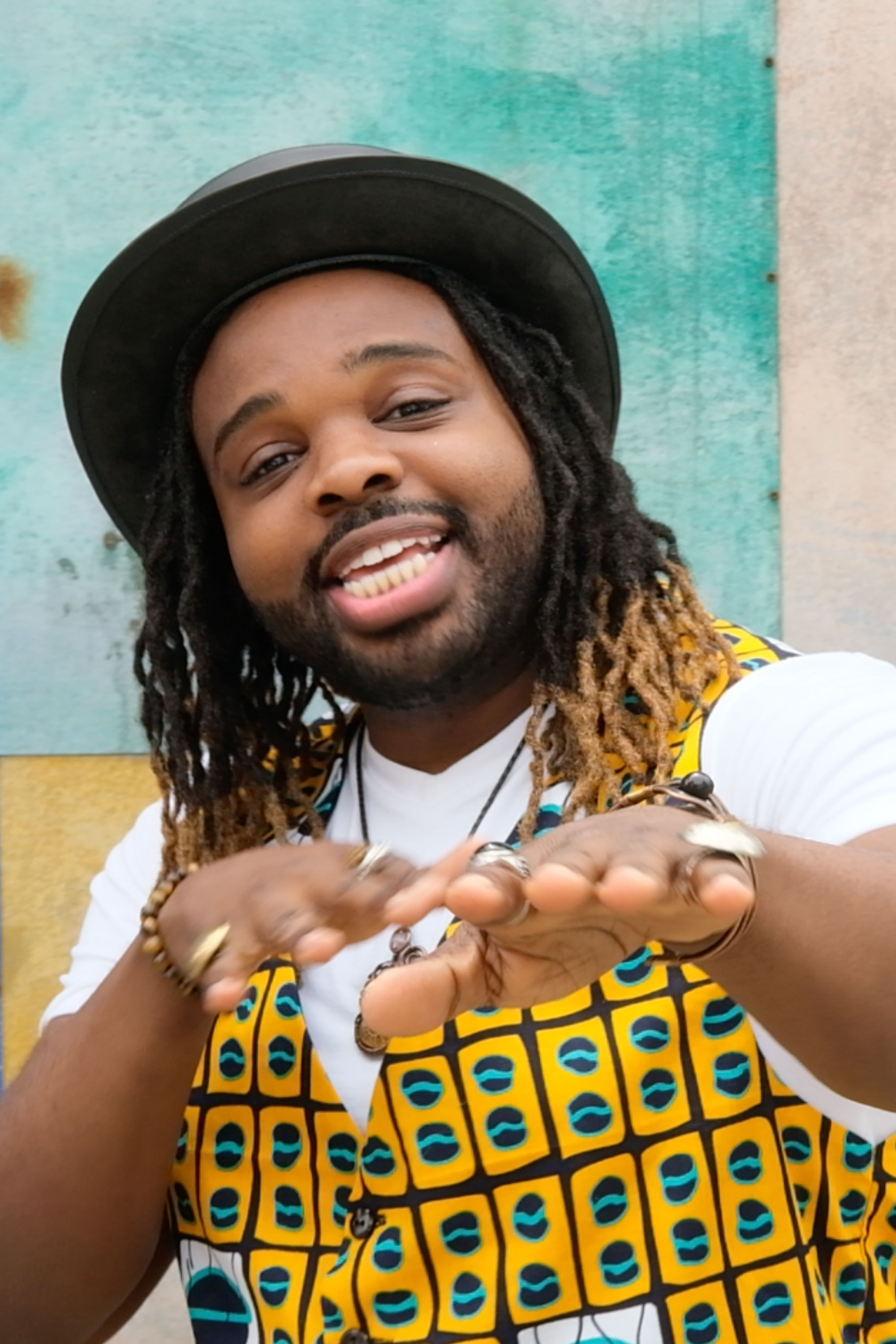
- Harmony by Fyütch (pictured) & Aura V is the most recent recipient
- Awarded for: Quality performances aimed at children
- Country: United States
- Presented by: National Academy of Recording Arts and Sciences
- First award: 1959
- Currently held by: Fyütch and Aura V – Harmony (2026)
- Website: grammy.com

The Grammy Award for Best Children's Album (from 2020: Grammy Award for Best Children's Music Album) is an honor presented since 2012 at the Grammy Awards, a ceremony that was established in 1958 and originally called the Gramophone Awards. Honors in various categories are presented at the ceremony annually by the National Academy of Recording Arts and Sciences of the United States to "honor artistic achievement, technical proficiency and overall excellence in the recording industry, without regard to album sales or chart position."

== History ==
The Best Children's Album award is given to recording artists for works containing quality performances aimed at children. The award has had several minor name changes:

- From 1959 to 1960 the award was known as Best Recording for Children
- In 1961 it was awarded as Best Album Created for Children
- From 1962 to 1968 it was awarded as Best Recording for Children
- In 1969 no award was given in the Children's Field
- From 1970 to 1991 it was awarded as Best Recording for Children
- From 1992 to 1993 it was awarded as Best Album for Children
- From 1994 to 2011 the award category was split into Best Musical Album for Children and Best Spoken Word Album for Children
- From 2012 to 2019 it was known as Best Children's Album, after the Best Musical Album for Children and Best Spoken Word Album for Children categories were merged (basically returning to the situation as it was prior to 1994, although with a small name change).
- In 2020, spoken-word children's albums were moved to the Best Spoken Word Album category. The category was renamed Best Children's Music Album.

The 2012 restructuring of these and other categories was a result of the Recording Academy's wish to decrease the list of categories and awards. According to the Academy, "[it] passed the proposal that a return to one category for all types of recordings for children, as it was from 1958 to 1993, would be most appropriate in this new context." As of the 67th Annual Grammy Awards in 2025, the category defines the intended audience range as "infant to 12 years old", and requires lyrics and English language translations to be included in entry submissions.

== Recipients ==
Year^{[I]}	Recipient(s)	Work	Nominees	Ref.
1959	Ross Bagdasarian Sr. (artist)	"The Chipmunk Song (Christmas Don't Be Late)"	Children's Marching Song – Cyril Stapleton (artist); Fun in Shariland – Shari Lewis (artist); Mommy, Give Me a Drinka Water – Danny Kaye (artist); "Tubby the Tuba" – José Ferrer (artist); "Witch Doctor" – Ross Bagdasarian Sr. (artist)	
1960	Peter Ustinov (artist)	Peter and the Wolf	The Arabian Nights – Maria Ray; Hansel & Gretel – Franz Allers; Popeye's Favorite Sea Chanties – Captain Allen Swift; Three to Make Music/Cinderella – Mary Martin	
1961	Ross Bagdasarian Sr. (artist)	Let's All Sing with The Chipmunks	Adventures in Music, Grade 3, Volume 1 – Howard Mitchell; Dr. Seuss Presents: Bartholomew and the Oobleck – Marvin Miller; Folk Songs for Young People – Pete Seeger; Mother Goose Nursery Rhymes – Sterling Holloway; Stories and Songs of the Civil War – Ralph Bellamy	
1962	Leonard Bernstein (artist)	Prokofiev: Peter And The Wolf	Golden Treasury of Great Music and Literature – (performed by Various Artists); One Hundred and One Dalmatians – (performed by original movie cast); The Soupy Sales Show – Soupy Sales (artist); Young Abe Lincoln (Broadway recording) – (performed by the original Broadway cast)	
1963	Leonard Bernstein (artist)	Saint-Saëns: Carnival of the Animals/Britten: Young Person's Guide to the Orchestra	The Cat Who Walked by Herself – Boris Karloff (artist); The Chipmunk Songbook – Ross Bagdasarian, Sr. (artist); Grimm's Fairy Tales – Danny Kaye (artist); Shari in Storyland – Shari Lewis (artist); Through Children's Eyes – The Limeliters (artist); You Read to Me, I'll Read to You – John Ciardi (artist)	
1964	Leonard Bernstein (artist)	Bernstein Conducts For Young People	Addition and Subtraction – Rica Owen Moore; Children's Concert – Pete Seeger (artist); Let's Go to the Zoo – (performed by various artists); On Top of Spaghetti – (performed by Tom Glazer & the Do-Re-Mi Children's Chorus); Puff, the Magic Dragon – Peter, Paul and Mary (artist); Winnie-the-Pooh – Jack Gilford (artist)	
1965	Dick Van Dyke & Julie Andrews (artists)	Mary Poppins	Britten: Young Person's Guide to the Orchestra – (narrated by Hugh Downs with Arthur Fiedler conducting the Boston Pops Orchestra); Chim Chim Cheree and Other Children's Choices – (performed by Burl Ives and Children's Chorus); Daniel Boone – Fess Parker; "A Spoonful of Sugar" – (performed by Mary Martin & the Do-Re-Mi Children's Chorus)	
1966	Marvin Miller (artist)	Dr. Seuss Presents: "Fox in Socks" and "Green Eggs and Ham"	Alice Through the Looking-Glass – (performed by the motion picture cast); The Christmas That Almost Wasn't – (performed by Paul Tripp and Cast); For the Children of the World: Art Linkletter Narrates the Bible – Art Linkletter; Happiness Is – (performed by Marty Gould conducting the Do-Re-Mi Children's Chorus)	
1967	Marvin Miller (artist)	"Dr. Seuss Presents - "If I Ran The Zoo" And "Sleep Book""	Love Songs for Children: "A" You're Adorable – Diahann Carroll; Patrick Muldoon and His Magic Balloon – Carmel Quinn; "Supercalifragilisticexpialidocious" – Ross Bagdasarian, Sr. (artist); Winnie-the-Pooh and the Honey Tree – Sterling Holloway & Sebastian Cabot (artists)	
1968	Boris Karloff (artist)	"Dr. Seuss: How The Grinch Stole Christmas"	The Carnival of the Animals – (narrated by Tutti Camarata, music by Symphonie-Orchester Graunke); A Happy Birthday Book with Winnie-the-Pooh – Sterling Holloway; The Jungle Book – (performed by the motion picture cast); Jungle Books – Richard Kiley (artist); Magic Fishbone/Happy Prince/Potted Princess – Julie Harris & Richard Kiley (artists)	
1970	Peter, Paul and Mary (artist)	Peter, Paul and Mommy	Chitty Chitty Bang Bang – (Performed by the Do-Re-Mi Chorus); Folk Tales of the Tribes of Africa – Eartha Kitt (artist); For All My Little Friends – Tiny Tim (artist); Yellow Submarine and Other Big Hits for Little People – (Performed by Richard Wolfe Children's Chorus)	
1971	Joan Cooney & Thomas Z. Shepard (producers)	Sesame Street	The Aristocats; A Boy Named Charlie Brown; Rubber Duckie; Susan Sings Songs from "Sesame Street" – Loretta Long (artist)	
1972	Bill Cosby (artist)	Bill Cosby Talks to Kids About Drugs	Sesame Street, Rubber Duckie and Other Songs from "Sesame Street" – (Performed by Richard Wolfe Children's Chorus); Sex Explained for Children – Stanley Daniels; The Story of Sheherazade – Julie Harris; Willy Wonka & the Chocolate Factory – (Performed by Peter Moore conducting the Golden Orchestra and Chorus)	
1973	Bill Cosby & Rita Moreno (artists) · Produced by Christopher Cerf, Joe Raposo, and Lee Chamberlin	"The Electric Company"	Kukla, Fran and Ollie; The Muppet Alphabet Album; Sesame Street II; Snoopy Come Home	
1974	Joe Raposo (producer)	Sesame Street Live!	Free to Be... You and Me; The Little Prince – Peter Ustinov (artist); Multiplication Rock – Bob Dorough (artist); Songs from "The Electric Company" TV Show	
1975	Paul Winchell, Sebastian Cabot & Sterling Holloway (artists)	"Winnie the Pooh and Tigger Too"	America Sings; Eli Wallach Reads Isaac Bashevis Singer – Eli Wallach; New Adventures of Bugs Bunny, Volume 2 – Mel Blanc; Robin Hood – Roger Miller	
1976	Richard Burton (artist)	"The Little Prince"	Bert & Ernie Sing-Along; Merry Christmas from Sesame Street; Mr. Popper's Penguins – Jim Backus; Really Rosie – Carole King (artist); Sesame Street Monsters	
1977	Hermione Gingold & Karl Böhm (artists)	Prokofiev: Peter and the Wolf/Saint-Saëns: Carnival of the Animals	The Adventures of Ali and His Gang vs. Mr. Tooth Decay – Muhammad Ali; Disney's A Christmas Carol; Snow White and the Seven Dwarfs; "Winnie-the-Pooh for President (Campaign Song)" – Sterling Holloway (artist)	
1978	Christopher Cerf & Jim Timmens (producers)	Aren't You Glad You're You	A Charlie Brown Christmas; Dope! The Dope King's Last Stand – Muhammad Ali; Russell Hoban, The Mouse and His Child – Peter Ustinov (artist); The Sesame Street Fairy Tale Album	
1979	Jim Henson (producer)	The Muppet Show	Charlie Brown's All-Stars; The Hobbit; Peter and the Wolf – (Performed by David Bowie with the Philadelphia Orchestra conducted by); Sesame Street Fever	
1980	Jim Henson & Paul Williams (producers)	The Muppet Movie	Anne Murray Sings for the Sesame Street Generation – Anne Murray; Sesame Disco; The Stars Come out on Sesame Street; You're in Love, Charlie Brown	
1981	David Levine & Lucy Simon (producers)	In Harmony: A Sesame Street Record	Big Bird's Bedtime Stories; Christmas Eve on Sesame Street; Love; The People in Your Neighborhood	
1982	Jim Henson & Dennis Scott (producers)	Sesame Country	Ants'hillvania; Big Bird Discovers the Orchestra; A Chipmunk Christmas; The Fox and the Hound	
1983	David Levine & Lucy Simon (producers)	In Harmony 2	Animals and Other Things – (Performed by Candle with the Agapeland Singers); Best of Friends – (Performed by The Smurfs); The Chipmunks Go Hollywood; Here Comes Garfield – Lou Rawls; I Am God's Project – (Performed by Birdwing Kids Korus)	
1984	Michael Jackson (artist) · Quincy Jones (producer)	E.T. The Extra-Terrestrial	Born to Add: The Great Rock N Roll from Sesame Street; The Music Machine II – Candle (artist); Rocky Mountain Holiday – (Performed by John Denver and the Muppets)	
1985	Shel Silverstein (artist) · Ron Haffkine (producer)	Where the Sidewalk Ends	Agapeland at Play with Holly Heart; Flashbeagle; Jim Henson's Muppets Present Fraggle Rock; Kids' Praise! 4: Singsational Servants; The Muppets Take Manhattan	
1986	Jim Henson & Steve Buckingham (producers)	Follow That Bird: The Original Motion Picture Soundtrack	Bullfrogs and Butterflies II – Candle; E.T.A. Hoffmann/Tchaikovsky: The Nutcracker – Christopher Plummer & Michael Tilson Thomas; Prokofiev: Peter and the Wolf – Dudley Moore & John Williams (artists); The Velveteen Rabbit – Meryl Streep & George Winston (artists); We Are the World – (Performed by Children of the World)	
1987	Jim Henson, Geri Van Rees & Kathryn King (producers)	The Alphabet	A Child's Gift of Lullabyes – Tanya Goodman Sykes; "Itsy Bitsy Spider" – Carly Simon; A Light in the Attic – Shel Silverstein; One-Minute Bedtime Stories – Shari Lewis	
1988	Bobby McFerrin & Jack Nicholson (artists) · Produced by Bobby McFerrin, Mark Sottnick, and Tom Bradshaw	The Elephant's Child	Bullfrogs and Butterflies Part III – Candle; The Emperor and the Nightingale – Glenn Close & Mark Isham (artists); Everything Grows – Raffi; Lullaby for Teddy – Barbara Fairchild	
1989	Robin Williams (artist) · Music by Ry Cooder · Produced by Mark Sottnick and Ry Cooder	Pecos Bill	The Bible: The Amazing Book – Candle; The Legend of Sleepy Hollow – Glenn Close & Tim Story (artists); Peter and the Wolf/Carnival of the Animals, Part II – "Weird Al" Yankovic & Wendy Carlos; The Tailor of Gloucester – Meryl Streep & The Chieftains; The Tale of Peter Rabbit – Meryl Streep & Lyle Mays	
1990	Tanya Goodman (artist) · David R. Lehman & J. Aaron Brown (producers)	The Rock-A-Bye Collection, Volume 1	Bullfrogs and Butterflies IV: I've Been Born Again; A Disney Spectacular (48 Favorite Disney Songs); Oliver and Company: Story and Songs from the Motion Picture; Raffi in Concert with the Rise and Shine Band – Raffi (artist); Thumbelina – Kelly McGillis & Mark Isham (artists)	
1991	Alan Menken (composer) Howard Ashman (lyricist)	The Little Mermaid: An Original Walt Disney Records Soundtrack	Doc Watson Sings Songs for Little Pickers – Doc Watson (artist); How the Leopard Got His Spots – Danny Glover & Ladysmith Black Mambazo (artists); The Little Mermaid: Read Along – Roy Dotrice (artist); The Rock-A-Bye Collection, Volume 2 – Tanya Goodman (artist)	
1992	Clifford "Barney", Robertson (producer)	A Cappella Kids	Brer Rabbit and the Wonderful Tar Baby – Danny Glover & Taj Mahal; The Emperor's New Clothes – John Gielgud & Mark Isham; Paul Bunyan – Jonathan Winters & Leo Kottke; Prokofiev: Peter and the Wolf / A Zoo Called Earth / Gerald McBoing Boing – Peter Schickele	
1993	Alan Menken & Howard Ashman (songwriters)	Beauty and the Beast: Original Motion Picture Soundtrack	Chipmunks in Low Places - Alvin and the Chipmunks; Snuggle Up: A Gift of Songs for Sweet Dreams – J. Aaron Brown, David R. Lehman and Barbara Bailey Hutchinson; Woody's Grow Big Songs 1 and 2; Pete Seeger's Family Concert – Pete Seeger	
2012	Gloria Domina, James Cravero, Kevin Mackie, Patrick Robinson & Steve Pullara (producers)	All About Bullies... Big and Small	Are We There Yet?; Fitness Rock & Roll - Miss Amy (artist); GulfAlive; I Love: Tom T. Hall's Songs Of Fox Hollow	
2013	The Okee Dokee Brothers · Engineered/Mixed & Produced by Dean Jones	Can You Canoe?	High Dive – Bill Harley (artist); Little Seed: Songs for Children by Woody Guthrie – Elizabeth Mitchell (artist); Radio Jungle – The Pop Ups (artist); A Swinging Jungle Tale	
2014	Jennifer Gasoi (artist) · Engineered/Mixed by Pierre Messier · Produced by Jennifer Gasoi	Throw a Penny in the Wishing Well	Blue Clouds – Elizabeth Mitchell & You Are My Flower (artist); The Mighty Sky – Beth Nielsen Chapman (artist); Recess – Justin Roberts (artist); Singing Our Way Through: Songs For The World's Bravest Kids – Alastair Moock & Friends (artist)	
2015	Neela Vaswani (artist)	I Am Malala: How One Girl Stood Up for Education and Changed the World	Appetite for Construction – The Pop Ups; Just Say Hi! – Brady Rymer and The Little Band That Could; The Perfect Quirk – Secret Agent 23 Skidoo; Through the Woods – The Okee Dokee Brothers	
2016	Tim Kubart (artist)	Home	¡Come Bien! Eat Right! – José-Luis Orozco; Dark Pie Concerns – Gustafer Yellowgold; How Great Can This Day Be – Lori Henriques; Trees – Molly Ledford & Billy Kelly	
2017	Secret Agent 23 Skidoo	Infinity Plus One	Explorer Of The World – Frances England; Novelties – Recess Monkey; Press Play – Brady Rymer And The Little Band That Could; Saddle Up – The Okee Dokee Brothers	
2018	Lisa Loeb (artist)	Feel What U Feel	Brighter Side – Gustafer Yellowgold; Lemonade – Justin Roberts; Rise Shine #Woke – Alphabet Rockers; Songs Of Peace & Love For Kids & Parents Around The World – Ladysmith Black Mambazo	
2019	Lucy Kalantari & The Jazz Cats	All The Sounds	Tim Kubart for Building Blocks; Falu for Falu's Bazaar; The Pop Ups for Giants of Science; FRANK & DEANE for The Nation of Imagine	
2020	Jon Samson & Al Walser	Ageless Songs for the Child Archetype	Caspar Babypants – Flying High!; Daniel Tashian – I Love Rainy Days; Alphabet Rockers – The Love; The Okee Dokee Brothers – Winterland	
2021	Joanie Leeds	All the Ladies	Alastair Moock & Friends – Be A Pain: An Album for Young (and Old) Leaders (declined nomination); Dog on Fleas – I'm an Optimist (declined nomination); The Okee Dokee Brothers – Songs for Singin' (declined nomination); Justin Roberts – Wild Life	
2022	Falu	A Colorful World	123 Andrés – Activate; 1 Tribe Collective – All One Tribe; Pierce Freelon – Black To The Future; Lucky Diaz & the Family Jam Band – Crayon Kids	
2023	Alphabet Rockers	The Movement	Wendy & DB – Into The Little Blue House; Lucky Diaz & the Family Jam Band – Los Fabulosos; Divinity Roxx – Ready Set Go!; Justin Roberts – Space Cadet	
2024	123 Andrés: Raniero Palm & Vladimir Suárez, producers; Leandro Alvarez, Luis Angel Bonilla & Orlando di Pietro, engineers/mixers	We Grow Together - Preschool Songs	Andrew & Polly – Ahhhhh!; Pierce Freelon & Nnenna Freelon – Ancestars; DJ Willy Wow! – Hip Hope for Kids!; Uncle Jumbo – Taste the Sky	
2025	Lucky Diaz & The Family Jam Band: Winning producers and engineers/mixers TBD	Brillo, Brillo!	Lucy Kalantari & The Jazz Cats – Creciendo; John Legend – My Favourite Dream; Rock For Children – Solid Rock Revival; Divinity Roxx & Divi Roxx Kids – World Wide Playdate	
2026	FYÜTCH & Aura V	Harmony	Joanie Leeds & Joya - Ageless: 100 Years Young; Mega Ran - Buddy's Magic Tree House; Flor Bromley - Herstory; Tori Amos - The Music of Tori Amos and The Muses	
2027	Winner TBA on 7 February 2027		Snooknuk - All in Good Time; Lucky Diaz & the Family Jam Band - Hasta la Vista...Baby; Scott & Mark Hoying - Little Birdie's Big Symphony; Lachi - Magnificent; Divinity Roxx & the Divi Roxx Kids - Starchild Volume 1	

=== Multiple wins ===
Wins	Recipients
5	Jim Henson
3	Leonard Bernstein
2	Howard Ashman
2	Ross Bagdasarian Sr.
2	Bill Cosby
2	David Levine
2	Alan Menken
2	Marvin Miller
2	Lucy Simon
