= Kindie rock =

Genre of children's music

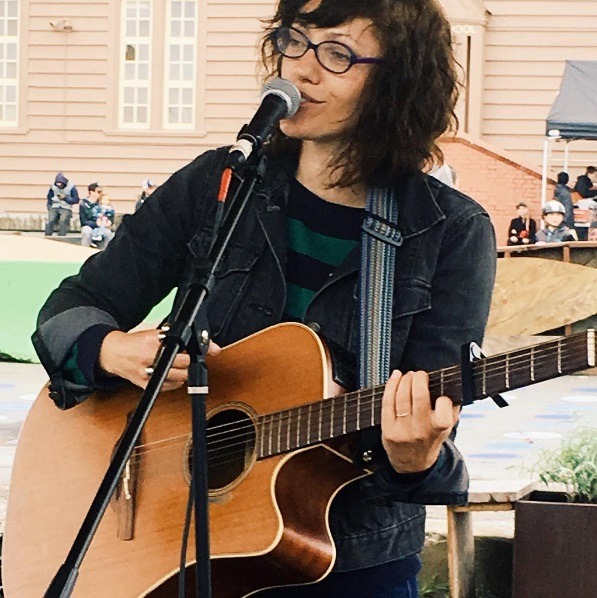
Frances England playing at the Grand Opening ceremony at Playland at 43rd Avenue in San Francisco on May 7, 2016.

Kindie rock, kindie or family music is a style of children's music that "melds the sensibility of the singer-songwriter with themes aimed at kids under 10." Many popular kindie rock artists first gained fame as adult performers, including Dan Zanes and They Might Be Giants. The term was coined by Salon.com writer Scott Lamb in 2006, and has gained in popularity since. Although its original name implies a rock music style, kindie has never been purely rock music, instead encompassing innumerable musical styles. In recent years, artists have increasingly used the less specific term "kindie music" or "kindie." Playtime Playlist, a kindie directory website, notes that the term kindie "comes from merging of 'Kid' and 'Independent'" and that kindie is differentiated from conventional children's music by the way that "artists are free to make music that comes straight from their heart and isn't bound by commercial formulaic rules." As pointed out by Stefan Shepard of the kindie music blog Zooglobble, kindie artists' primary aim is to make child-oriented music with the same care and thought as adult music. It is also defined by its opposition to "mainstream" or commercial children's music. Community is also an important part of the modern kindie scene, as exemplified by the biannual KindieComm conference and the yearly hootenanny gathering.

== History ==
=== Early 20th century ===
If one takes the precepts of Stefan Shepard's Kindie Manifesto as a working definition for kindie music, then it is clear that kindie has existed since at least the early 20th century, with folk singers such as Lead Belly and Woody Guthrie performing and writing many children's songs throughout their career. Music hall was also a source of children's music in the past, but folk singers remained the main proponents of independent kids' music throughout the early to mid 20th century. Jim Copp and Ed Brown were an exception to this rule, with their many quirky keyboard-based albums throughout the 1950s and '60s influencing numerous artists in the years to come.

=== 1970s–1990s ===
During the 1970s, '80s and '90s, the field of music for children became more popular in the 1970s and '80s, due largely to the advent of music-based children's television shows such as The Bugaloos and Sesame Street. Artists who were separate from television also proliferated, with Canadian Raffi selling millions of albums, while other artists such as Barry Louis Polisar gained popularity and toured widely. Many other artists who still perform for children today began performing in the 1980s and '90s, including Bill Harley and Cathy Fink & Marcy Marxer.

=== 2000s: Rise to prominence ===
The kindie genre has seen its first signs of significant growth at the start of the new millennium. In 1998 and 2000, respectively, Laurie Berkner and Dan Zanes self-released their debut kids' albums and are generally considered to have kickstarted the modern kindie movement. Although the children's music industry had been growing in the 1990s, with the digital age it became easier for children to gain access to media and for independent artists to promote their work. Over the first two decades of the 21st century, the number and recognition of artists making kindie music grew exponentially, becoming more mainstream.

Its rise to being mainstream in the 2000s was largely attributed with the introduction of various platforms devoted to the promotion of children's music, including among others, the launching of the SiriusXM Kids Place Live channel in the fall of 2001, and at the time, there were very few independent kids artists to fill the station. Some major artists of the period, such as Barry Louis Polisar, Ziggy Marley, and Trout Fishing in America began to get national airplay for the first time, allowing more artists to take inspiration from their works. Also in the same year, Laurie Berkner began her road to stardom from having performed for New York City families to having her first-ever national television appearance on NBC's Today show. Her Today show appearance resulted in sales of her early cassettes and CDs, and while the Internet was still in its infancy, orders for her music on Amazon were immediately swamped.

Another key factor in kindie's increasing prevalence was when the Viacom (now ViacomCBS) preschool cable channel Noggin began airing "Move to the Music" interstitials between programs featuring the likes of Laurie Berkner, Dan Zanes, and Lisa Loeb sharing their music with kids.

=== 2010s: Mainstream popularity ===
In recent years, kindie music has gained recognition and its own distinctive niche as many music festivals and trade shows celebrating the genre have taken place as well as many radio shows and podcasts have been created from the genre. The genre has also seen significant growth in terms of the musical styles covered, including among others, the introduction of pop-inspired, hip-hop-inspired, as well as jazz and country inspired artists, as well as some Latino-American acts doing bilingual works allowing the Spanish-speaking minority to be represented by the genre. Many kindie acts have been honored at the Grammy Awards in recent years, such as the Pop Ups, Lucy Kalantari, the Okee Dokee Brothers and Lisa Loeb, among others.

For some in the industry, this decade marked the "blossoming" of the genre as more acts and styles had emerged. One of the key acts of this decade was The Pop Ups, based in Brooklyn, New York, making 80s-inspired pop music for kids. Another was San Francisco-based Frances England, known for her slow-toned and heartfelt music. Also from the Bay Area that emerged in the 2010s were the Alphabet Rockers, a hip-hop kids group aiming to use their music towards the fight for social justice and equality. Another hip-hop kindie act was Secret Agent 23 Skidoo who has produced multiple albums in the decade. Brady Rymer was also known to make folk and country styled kids music including an album inspired by his experiences in working with children with sensory disorders.

=== 2020s: COVID-19 pandemic and diversity initiatives ===
Many kindie artists have made several songs covering the COVID-19 pandemic. These remind kids and families of basic health protocols such as wearing face masks, hand washing, social distancing, and to also send reassurances to families while under self-isolation. Some artists have also done virtual concerts which have doubled as fundraisers for charities leading in relief response to those impoverished by the pandemic.

Another major issue that hounded the genre in 2020 was how minority voices were being represented in the genre, as there are many people of color in the field that have not received national attention. A testament to the systemic bias in the industry can be traced to the nominees for the Grammy Best Children's Album category in 2020, in which all the nominees were mostly white. This sparked protests from three of the nominees, namely Alastair Moock, The Okee Dokee Brothers, and Dog On Fleas.

The protest of the declined nominees has led to discussions about reforms in the genre regarding representation and diversity and has led to several radical changes, such as the use of the term "family music" for the genre to help distinguish it from commercial kids music such as Cocomelon, Pinkfong, and others. It has also resulted in the foundation of the collective organization Family Music Forward, advocating racial equity in the children's music field. It was founded by several key artists of color in the industry such as Pierce Freelon, Aaron Nigel Smith, Uncle Devin, Little Miss Ann, SaulPaul, Mil's Trills, and 123 Andres, among others. They have initiated many efforts towards the promotion and amplification of diverse voices in the genre, such as "Kukuza Fest", the first ever all-black family-friendly music festival. The first edition took place on September 19 and 20, 2020. It featured 14 family artists of color and generated over 14,000 views over WEE Nation Radio's Facebook and YouTube pages. The success of this edition spawned a second edition held on April 10, 2021, highlighting black women in family music, featuring 16 artists.

== Genres ==
Although the term "kindie rock" seems to limit the music to the rock genre, there are kindie artists who work in an extremely large variety of musical styles, sometimes using numerous styles on a single album or release. Current or formerly active kindie musicians encompass many subgenres of rock, including roots rock, indie rock, metal, psychedelic rock, pop music, prog-rock, and punk. Other musical styles practiced by kindie musicians include electronica, experimental music, folk, hip hop, jazz, reggae, and soul, among others.

== Community and industry organizations ==
A fixture of modern kindie music is its community-centered ethos, as evidenced by the great amount of collaborations between kindie artists. There are also three important organizations and conferences that serve to further the communal and collaborative aspect of the industry.

Begun as an annual conference, but since moved to a biennial status, Kindiecomm is one of the main conferences for kindie musicians and was formed by Kathy O'Connell and Robert Drake of WXPN's Kids Corner radio show in 2013 "to capture the camaraderie and creativity of our musical family, while sharing useful information in an intimate setting."

Predating the modern kindie movement, the Children's Music Network was founded in 1987 as a way of perpetuating and supporting children's music. In many ways, the industry support pioneered by the Children's Music Network has continued into the modern era.

Although kindie as a named genre is centered in the United States, other countries and regions have similar national children's music associations and conferences, notably the Kiwi Kids Music association from New Zealand and Movimiento Canción Infantil Latinoamericana y Caribeña, a biannual meeting which gathers children's music artists from all over Latin America.

New Zealand has such a scene concerning family music, with most of the children's music being funded by NZ On Air allowing for direct state support of the industry. One of the key pioneers of the genre is Suzy Cato, who is known as a children's musician and television host.

== Media support ==
=== Blogs ===
The kindie movement has received much support from blogs based on reviewing and discussing kindie music, most notably Zooglobble, which was founded in 2002.

=== Radio shows and podcasts ===
There are numerous radio shows and podcasts that mainly feature kindie music, some of the most prominent of which are Kids Corner on WXPN in Philadelphia (which has been broadcasting since 1988 and has won the George Peabody Award), Spare the Rock on KUTX (broadcasting since 2005 and syndicated nationally) and the OWTK Kid's Music Monthly Podcast (since 2012). Most of the existing kindie-based radio shows and podcasts have a music-based freeform radio format, although some, like Kids Corner, adopt more of an education-based, variety show format. In addition, the majority of kindie radio shows are based in public or community radio stations, such as "Radio Active Kids" on Asheville FM in North Carolina and "The Children's Hour" on KUNM-FM in Albuquerque, New Mexico, which has been syndicated to hundreds of public radio stations in the United States, and airs globally through multiple streaming stations. Other stations that predominantly feature kindie music include SiriusXM's Kids Place Live in the United States/Canada, which has several top kindie artists and their works on rotation, as well as other special features and programs, some of which are hosted by top kindie artists. There are also some online stations devoted to the genre, such as "WEE Nation Radio", which plays kindie music with a much broader worldview putting into focus family-friendly jazz, reggae, R&B, and world music that have been overlooked by other children's radio stations. In addition the station runs a podcast and a weekly show on WPFW in Washington DC with interviews and features highlighting the station's core artists and causes. Another podcast that celebrates the genre is "Ear Snacks", created by kindie artists Andrew & Polly, which puts out "Roadtrip Mixtape" selections of top kindie songs as well as an annual tribute to Grammy nominees in the Best Children's Album category featuring interviews with the year's nominated artists.

== International kindie music ==
Although the majority of bands who call themselves "kindie" are from North America, there exists a large amount of kindie-esque music from around the world. If one looks solely at music that is created by non-anonymous musicians who use sophisticated musical styles, it is possible to view many artists from different cultures as fitting into the kindie realm. Most of the prominent kids' musicians from around the world use European-influenced music styles, although many artists from Latin America include locally influenced music as well.

=== Latin America ===
There are many different children's music scenes throughout Latin America, encompassing Argentina, Brazil, Chile, Colombia, Ecuador, and Mexico, to name some of the most prominent. A notable feature of Latin American kindie music, unlike artists from the United States, Europe, or Oceania, is the prevalence of musical theater as a format for their concerts.

=== Oceania ===
Australia has a popular and internationally recognized kindie scene, although there are not as many artists in Australia as in other countries. There are also many artists from New Zealand, which are gaining international recognition in both hemispheres.
