= KindieComm =

KindieComm is one of the main conferences for American kindie musicians and was formed by Kathy O'Connell and Robert Drake of WXPN's Kids Corner radio show in 2013. Begun as an annual conference, but since moved to a biennial status, it is held in Philadelphia and serves to further the communal and collaborative aspect of the kindie music industry while advocating for independent children's music.

O'Connell and Drake decided to form the conference after KindieFest, the first ever kindie music conference that took place annually in Brooklyn, shut down following the 2013 conference due to organizers' conflicting schedules, despite that year being their most widely-attended festival yet.

KindieComm events include workshops, debates and networking opportunities as well as the KindieComm Industry Showcase and Kids Corner Music Festival, both of which feature musical performances by kindie musicians and the latter of which offers tickets that are open to the public.

== 2014 ==
The first KindieComm was held on June 28, 2014. The Kids Corner Music Festival took place on the following day and included headliner Trout Fishing in America along with musical performances by Barry Louis Polisar, Dan Zanes and Lucky Diaz.

== 2015 ==
The 2015 conference was held March 21–22 and the line-up for the Kids Corner Music Festival included the Pop Ups, the Not-Its! and Joanie Leeds and the Nightlights.

== 2016 ==
The 2016 conference held April 2–3 featured talks by Bob Dorough and Robbie Kumalo as well as musical performances by Sugar Free Allstars and Lucy Kalantari, while the Kids Corner Music Festival included headliner Tim Kubart and performances by Duke Otherwise and Laura Doherty and the Heartbeats.

On August 18, 2016, O'Connell and Drake announced that KindieComm was changing to a biennial gathering with the next conference scheduled for Spring 2018 in order to help ensure that artists who were interested in attending could work it into their budget and schedule.

== 2018 ==
KindieComm 2018 was held April 20–22 and included talks by Dr. Demento and John Cafiero. The Kids Corner Music Festival included headliner Trout Fishing in America and performances by Billy Kelly, Lard Dog and the Band of Shy and Philadelphia Boys Choir and Chorale.

== 2020 ==
On March 10, 2020, O'Connell and Drake announced that there would be no KindieComm in 2020 due to restrictions resulting from the ongoing COVID-19 pandemic in the United States and that they would be issuing refunds to those who registered, with the next conference scheduled to occur in April 2021.
