= Jack Forman =

American bassist

- Jack Forman, Office Hours

Background information
- Origin: Seattle, WA
- Genres: Children's Music
- Occupations: On Air Host on SiriusXM's Kids Place Live; Bassist frontman for Recess Monkey; Solo family musician
- Instruments: Bass, Voice, Keyboards
- Website: http://www.jackformanmusic.com

Jack Forman is the bassist frontman for the Seattle-based kids' band, Recess Monkey, a solo musician for kids and family audiences, a former on-air host on SiriusXM Satellite Radio's Kids Place Live, channel 134; and an author published on Compendium Inc. Forman has produced sixteen albums for family audiences, earning a GRAMMY Nomination in the "Best Children's Album" category in the 59th Annual Grammy Awards for Recess Monkey's 2016 release Novelties. He and Recess Monkey bandmate Drew Holloway wrote a book for Compendium Publishing.

== History ==
Forman attended The University of Washington in Seattle, where he studied English with a Creative Writing emphasis. His work with children began in 1996 at Camp Hess Kramer in Malibu, CA where he served as a cabin counselor, specialist and unit head for four summers. Immediately after graduating college he began teaching full-time at Seattle's University Child Development School in various elementary and pre-school levels. It was there that Forman met Drew Holloway and Daron Henry, founding members of Recess Monkey, and began playing music for kids and family audiences beginning in 2005.

== Discography ==
=== As solo artist ===
- Songs From the Monkey House (2017)
- Office Hours (2019)
- Hold the Phone (2020)
- Can’t Buy a Thrill Ride (2021)

=== With Recess Monkey ===
- Welcome to Monkey Town (2005)
- Animal House (2006)
- Wonderstuff (2007)
- Tabby Road (2008)
- Field Trip (2009)
- The Final Funkier (2010)
- Flying (2011)
- In Tents (2012)
- Deep Sea Diver (2013)
- Desert Island Disc (2013)
- Wired (2014)
- Hot Air (2015)
- Novelties (2016)
- Family Photo Album (2018)

== Awards and acknowledgements ==
Songs From the Monkey House won a 2017 NAPPA Award for its "witty" songs: "Taking a recess from his Grammy-nominated band Recess Monkey, Jack Forman has concocted a super fun solo album." The album was also named the #10 album for families in 2017 by the Fids and Kamily Awards.

Forman is also a GRAMMY-Nominated musician: Recess Monkey's 2016 family album "Novelties" was nominated for "Best Children's Album" in the 59th Annual Grammy Awards.

== "Live From the Monkey House," SiriusXM's Kids Place Live, Channel 134 ==
Forman began hosting his afternoon/evening live call-in show "Live From the Monkey House" on SiriusXM Satellite Radio's Kids Place Live (Channel 134) in January 2013. Jack broadcast from his home studio in Seattle via a dedicated line connected to SiriusXM's Washington DC studios. The show had daily themes that vary based on current events, listener-fueled ideas and game show style games. Forman was live for three hours Monday-Thursday, 5pm-8pm ET, 2pm-5pm PT; and presented "This Week in the Monkey House," a replay show of highlights from the week, on Saturdays at 7am PT, 10am ET for four hours. The show’s final episode aired February 12, 2024. On February 28, 2024, Forman released the first episode of a new podcast, "Jack Forman's Monkey House" on Patreon.

== Published works ==
Forman and Recess Monkey bandmate Drew Holloway wrote an interactive picture book for family audiences, illustrated by Rob McClurkan, entitled Dive In: A Topsy-Turvy-Say-It-Out-Loud Underwater Adventure in 2016.
