= Rolie Polie Guacamole =

Kindie rock band from Brooklyn, New York

- Origin: New York City, New York, United States
- Genres: kindie rock; children's music; family music
- Years active: 2008–present
- Members: Frank Gallo; Andrew Tuzhilin; Rossen Nedelchev
- Past members: Josh Davis; Peter Barr; Christian McCarthy
- Website: www.roliepolieguacamole.com

Rolie Polie Guacamole is an American kindie rock band from Brooklyn, New York made up of Frank Gallo and Andrew Tuzhilin. The band has recorded 11 albums and won three Parents' Choice Awards. On January 19, 2024 Recess Therapy released a video called "How to make a #1 hit song in a day" where Julian Shapiro-Barnum asks Ike to list his three favorite artists. Ike responds "Rolie Polie Guacamole, Tom Petty, & The Beatles." It instantly went viral with over 100 million views across Tik Tok & Instagram.
