= Kindiependent =

American collective for children's music

The Kindiependent Collective is an American collective of children's music performers and supporters based in Seattle, Washington, who collaborate on recordings, performances and music business related projects. The collective is composed of Recess Monkey, Caspar Babypants, The Not-Its!, The Harmonica Pocket, Johnny Bregar, The Board of Education and Brian Vogan and His Good Buddies.

== Group performances ==
Kindiependent organizes several music series shows across the Seattle area including the Kids Rock Series at the Mount Baker Community Club. In collaboration with the Northwest Folklife Festival, they showcase a daylong collection of family music performances each Memorial Day.

== Music collaborations ==
Members of the Kindiependent Collective sometimes assemble to create collaborative music in mixed up pairings. Collaborations have included songs such as "Vagabond Worms" and "Kids' Table" as well as a collection of six Birthday-themed songs frequently played on SiriusXM's Kids Place Live Channel 78, entitled "The Happy Birthday EP."
