= Recess Monkey =

American kindie rock trio

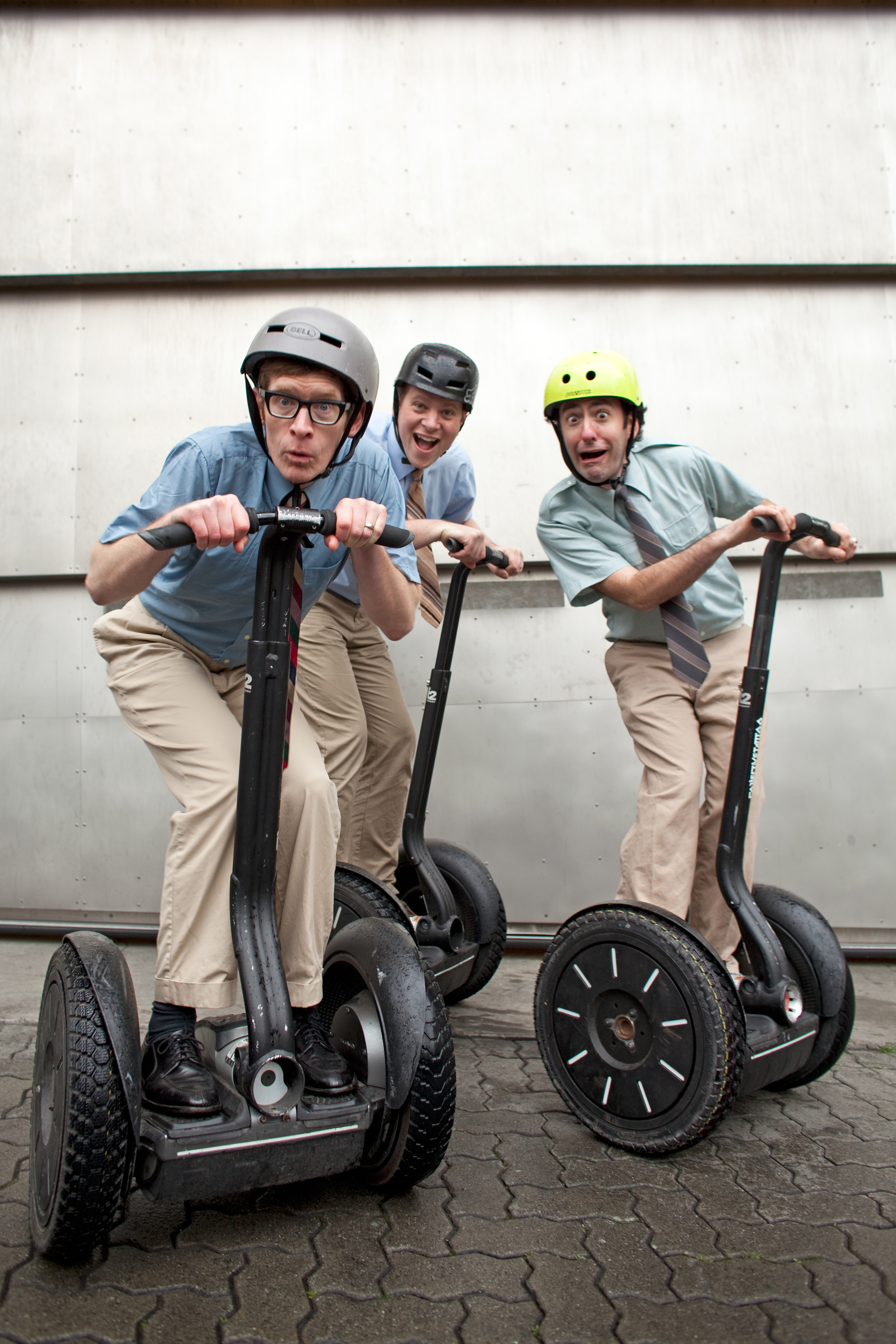
- Recess Monkey is (L to R): Drew Holloway, Korum Bischoff and Jack Forman.

Background information
- Origin: Seattle, United States
- Genre: Children's music
- Years active: 2005–present
- Label: independent record label
- Members: Drew Holloway; Jack Forman; Korum Bischoff
- Website: www.recessmonkey.com

Recess Monkey is a Seattle-based trio of current and former elementary school teachers who have made music for kids and families since their debut album Welcome to Monkey Town in 2005. They have since released 14 albums for family audiences. They perform live concerts throughout the United States with an emphasis on audience participation, dancing, and a focus on the entire family.

== History ==
The band's original members, Drew Holloway (lead vocals, guitar), Jack Forman (bass, vocals) and Daron Henry (drums) met as colleagues at Seattle's University Child Development School. They originally performed adult-focused independent rock as The Waiting Room but soon experimented with combining their indie-rock music with childhood themes. Drummer Henry was replaced in late 2012 by Korum Bischoff (formerly of The Dead Science), who continues as the third member of the trio.

The name of the band is similar to a fictitious band from an SCTV sketch "Pre-Teen World Telethon for Pre-Teen World" called "The Recess Monkeys" consisting of John Candy, Eugene Levy, and Rick Moranis.

== Recordings ==
=== Discography ===
Recess Monkey is known as a major contributor to the American "Kindie Rock" musical community, routinely releasing a new album each year, each with its own unique theme.

1. Welcome to Monkey Town, 2005
2. Animal House, 2006
3. Wonderstuff, 2007
4. Tabby Road, 2008
5. Field Trip', 2009
6. The Final Funktier, 2010
7. Flying, 2011, produced by Tor Hyams
8. In Tents, 2012, produced by Dean Jones
9. Deep Sea Diver', 2013
10. Desert Island Disc, 2013
11. Wired, 2014, produced by John Vanderslice
12. Hot Air, 2015, produced by John Vanderslice
13. Novelties, 2016
14. Family Photo Album, 2018

=== Awards and Distinctions ===
Recess Monkey's albums have received multiple awards from nationally recognized family music organizations.

==== Novelties ====
Their 2016 album Novelties was nominated for a 2017 GRAMMY Award in the Best Children's Album category. The album was awarded the gold medal by the Parent's Choice Award board, who asked, "What happens when you mix together three very musical educators from Seattle, fourteen original songs, and fold in great production? They rock!" Novelties received a NAPPA Award in October 2016. The album was an Amazon Originals Family Album, presented exclusively on the Amazon and Amazon Prime platform. The album earned the #8 spot on the annual Fids and Kamily music poll in November 2016. School Library Journal named the album one of the ten best of 2016.

==== Hot Air ====
Their 2015 album Hot Air was awarded the gold medal by the Parent's Choice Award board, which praised its "irresistible sophistication of melody lines, layered harmonies and pop rhythms." Hot Air received a silver NAPPA Award for its "tunes that hold a sunny, Beatles-like quality." Hot Air also received a KIDS First Award for its "potent punch of fun, danceable and delightfully listenable tunes that will lift your spirits and take you on flights of fancy". The album earned the #5 spot on the annual Fids and Kamily music poll.

==== Wired ====
2014's Wired earned the #3 spot on the annual Fids and Kamily music poll.

==== Deep Sea Diver ====
2013's Deep Sea Diver earned a #6 spot on the annual Fids and Kamily music poll.

==== In Tents ====
2012's In Tents earned a #3 spot on the annual Fids and Kamily music poll.

==== Flying ====
2011's Flying earned the #1 spot on the annual Fids and Kamily music poll.

==== The Final Funktier ====
2010's The Final Funktier earned the #4 spot on the annual Fids and Kamily music poll. It earned 4 stars (out of 4) in People Magazine who deemed it "irresistibly fun."

==== Field Trip ====
2009's Field Trip earned the #3 spot on the annual Fids and Kamily music poll. The album was also selected as an American Library Association Notable Children's Recording.

== On Sirius XM, Kids Place Live – Channel 78 ==
Recess Monkey has earned several #1 hits on Sirius XM's Kids Place Live Channel 78 and have played yearly live shows in the channel's Rumpus Room series since 2008. In 2013, Recess Monkey's bassist emcee Jack Forman became an on-air host on SiriusXM's Kids Place Live, hosting the daily, nationally broadcast call-in show "Live From the Monkey House."

== Notable live performances ==
The band has played on the children's stages at several nationally acclaimed festivals including Lollapalooza in 2010 and 2016, Austin City Limits in 2011, The Life is Good Festival in 2013, Seattle's Northwest Folklife Festival multiple years, and The Bumbershoot Festival in 2009. They have been featured at the Getty Museum in Los Angeles on two occasions, in 2009 and 2013.

Recess Monkey is a frequent performer at performing arts centers across North America. Shows have included Symphony Space in New York City, They played the Millennium Stage at The John F. Kennedy Center in Washington, D.C., in 2011 and The Segerstrom Center For the Arts in Orange County, California. The band has also been featured in several runs of Big Top Rock music and circus shows geared for the whole family at Seattle's Teatro ZinZanni, including 2012's "In Tents," 2013's "Tambourine Submarine" 2014's "Curious Circus." and 2015's "Lighter Than Air." The band has played several engagements at Wolf Trap's Children's Theater in the Woods in Vienna, Virginia.

Recess Monkey appeared with The Dalai Lama at Seattle's Seeds of Compassion event in 2008, playing to an audience of 50,000 at Qwest Field (now CenturyLink Field). The band joined other nationally acclaimed family musicians at 2014's New Year's Eve live music festivities at Legoland California, playing two sets. Recess Monkey also shared the stage with The Okee Dokee Brothers and comedian Larry The Cable Guy at Nebraska's Lincoln Children's Zoo's Zoobilee in August 2015.

== Video productions ==
Recess Monkey has created several dozen self-produced video works. In tandem with their release of 2009's Field Trip album, they released two 90 minute DVDs in the Field Trips With Recess Monkey series. Each DVD is broken into four short episodes and the volumes are known by their episode numberings, Episodes 1-4 and Episodes 5-8. The DVDs blended music videos with live performances, interviews and were hosted by the band's fictitious hand puppet band manager Mayor Monkey. The band has self-produced three full-length concert videos of each of their teatro ZinZanni Big Top Rock series, released for free on YouTube and other platforms. Recess Monkey's 2015 audio album Hot Air was released with a tandem 40-minute DVD video also entitled Hot Air which tells a narrative story in a mixed media, animated form. The band has created numerous standalone music videos for songs from 2008 to present.

== Kindiependent Collective ==
The band is a member of the Seattle-based Kindiependent Collective, which includes Caspar Babypants, The Not-Its, Johnny Bregar, The Harmonica Pocket, The Board of Education and Brian Vogan and His Good Buddies.
