= Morgan Taylor (songwriter) =

American illustrator and songwriter (1969–2022)

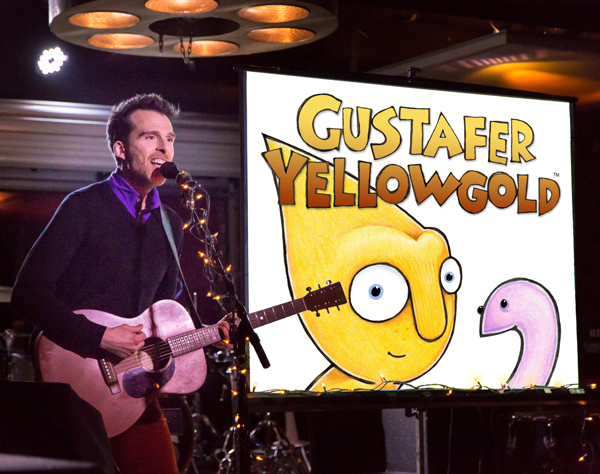
- Taylor in 2017
- Born: Morgan Andrew Taylor; September 5, 1969; Kettering, Ohio, U.S.
- Died: August 11, 2022 (aged 52); Miamisburg, Ohio, U.S.
- Occupation(s): Illustrator, songwriter
- Spouse: Rachel Loshak (m. 2004)
- Children: 2

Morgan Andrew Taylor (September 5, 1969 – August 11, 2022) was an American illustrator and songwriter. He was perhaps best known for his creation of the fictional character Gustafer Yellowgold, which earned two nominations for the Grammy Awards for Best Children's Album.

== Biography ==
Taylor was born in Kettering, Ohio, the son of Elizabeth Young and Gordon Taylor. He attended Kettering High School. Taylor attended college, but left without earning a degree. He moved to New York in 1999.

Taylor worked as a sound engineer. In 2004, he married Rachel Loshak; they have two children, Harvey and Ridley. In the same year, Taylor created the character Gustafer Yellowgold. He had his own radio program on the AM radio station WKNY.

Taylor was nominated for two Grammy Awards in the category Best Children's Album. His first nomination was for the song "Dark Pie Concerns" at the 58th Annual Grammy Awards. His second nomination was for the song "Brighter Side" at the 60th Annual Grammy Awards.

Taylor died of sepsis in August 2022 at a hospital in Miamisburg, Ohio, at the age of 52.
