= Blueprint of a Lady: Sketches of Billie Holiday =

Studio album by Nnenna Freelon
- Released: 23 August 2005
- Recorded: March – April 2005
- Studio: Fantasy Studios, Berkeley, California
- Genre: Jazz
- Length: 1:02:46
- Label: Concord Jazz CCD 22892

Nnenna Freelon chronology
Live at The Kennedy Center, Washington D.C. (2003)	Blueprint of a Lady: Sketches of Billie Holiday (2005)	Better Than Anything (2008)

Blueprint of a Lady: Sketches of Billie Holiday is a 2005 album by Nnenna Freelon recorded in tribute to Billie Holiday.

The songs "Only You Will Know" and "Interlude - Little Brown Bird" are original compositions by Freelon and Brandon McCune that were written in homage to Holiday.

== Reception ==
Writing for All About Jazz, Ken Franckling wrote that Freelon pays tribute to Holiday "in the best possible way—without imitation and putting her own interpretations on material written by or associated with Lady Day" with Freelon's band "skilfully complement[ing] her at every turn" and that Freelon's "phrasing and vocal clarity contribute to an overall feeling that is more positive than Holiday's often dark and plaintive renditions of the same material". Franckling praises the saxophonist Doug Lawrence as offering a "sublime conversational response" to Freelon on "You've Changed" and felt that guitarist Julian Lage "sparkles throughout". Though Holiday and Mal Waldron wrote the song "Left Alone", Holiday never recorded it. Franckling felt that Freelon "unearths the positives buried beneath Holiday's words about loneliness".

Christopher Loudon wrote for the Jazz Times that we "get to observe slices of the Holiday songbook from entirely fresh, forthright perspectives".

Ken Dryden reviewed the album for Allmusic and wrote that Freelon "had no intention of making her tribute to Billie Holiday a straight-ahead remake of songs associated with Lady Day. But the danger of straying too far from these well-known melodies is that these contemporary arrangements end up sounding both overblown yet bland" and that "Freelon has long since proved herself as one of the best jazz vocalists of her generation, but this salute to Billie Holiday will likely be of limited appeal to many dedicated fans of Lady Day."

== Track listing ==
1. "I Didn't Know What Time It Was" (Lorenz Hart, Richard Rodgers) – 4:18
2. "What a Little Moonlight Can Do" (Harry M. Woods) – 5:13
3. "Don't Explain" (Billie Holiday, Arthur Herzog, Jr.) – 4:03
4. "God Bless the Child" (Holiday, Herzog) – 5:21
5. "Strange Fruit" (Abel Meeropol) – 2:20
6. "Willow Weep For Me" (Ann Ronell) – 2:52
7. "Balm in Gilead" (Traditional) – 4:49
8. "Them There Eyes" (Maceo Pinkard, Doris Tauber, William Tracey) – 5:09
9. "Only You Will Know" (Nnenna Freelon, Brandon McCune) – 3:41
10. "You've Changed" (Bill Carey, Carl Fischer) – 5:24
11. "Now or Never" (Holiday, Curtis Reginald Lewis) – 2:55
12. "Lover Man" (Jimmy Davis, Roger ("Ram") Ramirez, James Sherman) – 4:14
13. "Left Alone" (Holiday, Mal Waldron) – 5:02
14. "Little Brown Bird (Interlude)" (Freelon, McCune) – 1:32
15. "All of Me" (Gerald Marks, Seymour Simons) – 5:53

== Personnel ==
- Wayne Batchelor - acoustic bass guitar, arranger, acoustic bass
- Nnenna Freelon - arranger, producer, vocals
- Brandon McCune - arranger, fender rhodes, Hammond B3, piano, trumpet
- Beverly Botsford - arranger, percussion
- Abbey Anna - art direction
- Jesse Nichols - assistant engineer, mixing
- Josiah Gluck - audio engineer, engineer, mixing
- Nick Phillips - audio production, producer
- Jessica Ivry - cello
- Kinah Boto - drums
- Mary Fettig - alto flute, rhythm arrangements, alto saxophone, baritone saxophone
- André Bush, Julian Lage - guitar
- Terri Apanasewicz - hair stylist
- John Clayton - horn arrangements
- Rudy Calvo - make-up
- George Horn - mastering
- Danielle Brancazio - package design
- Randee Saint Nicholas - photography
- Ed Keane - producer
- Doug Lawrence - tenor saxophone
- Christian Scott - trumpet
