= I Am God's Project =

Studio album by Birdwing Kids Korus
- Released: 1982
- Recorded: 1982
- Genre: Children's music, Christian music
- Label: Birdwing; BWC-2039, BWR-2039
- Producer: Linda and Frostie Gray and Billy Ray Hearn

Professional ratings
Review scores
Source	Rating
Allmusic	2/5 stars

I Am God's Project is an album from The Birdwing Kids Korus. It was nominated for the Best Recording for Children category for the Grammy Awards of 1983. It is sometimes credited to Heather and Daniel as the recording artist (these are the names of the characters who host the songs on the album). It is also part of the Agapeland related album series.

== Track listing ==
| all_writing = Linda Gray

1. "Bloom Where You're Planted"
2. "Change Your Thoughts"
3. "G-L-Y-S-D-I" (AKA "God Loves You, So Do I")
4. "I Am God's Project"
5. "Infinite Possibilities" (AKA "There are Infinite Possibilities in Little Beginnings")
6. "Only God Can Count The Apples"
7. "The Size Of Your God"
8. "When It Rains Look For the Rainbow"
9. "You Can Become The Person You Want To Be"
