= Randy Kaplan =

American dramatist

- Born: Randall Leigh Kaplan
- Origin: Dix Hills, New York, United States
- Genres: Children's music; Folk; Country blues; Ragtime
- Occupations: Singer-songwriter; Playwright; Poet; Performer
- Years active: 1990s–present
- Label: myKaZoo Music

Randy Kaplan (b. Randall Leigh Kaplan) is an American songwriter, playwright, poet, and performer. He gained renown for his “not-JUST-for-kids” music in the mid-aughts, first in Brooklyn, New York, and later nationwide. Dedicated members of his fan base call themselves FORKs (Fans of Randy Kaplan). He was signed with myKaZoo Music for his CD dedicated to Country Blues and Ragtime music (Mr. Diddie Wah Diddie), which Universal Music released.

Randy has released six not-JUST-for-kids CDs (with his seventh, Shake It and Break It, released on May 10, 2019). Previous "kids" records include Five Cent Piece (2006), Loquat Rooftop (2008), The Kids Are All Id (2010), Mr. Diddie Wah Diddie (2012), Jam on Rye (2014), and Trippin' Round the Mitten (2017). Previous not-REALLY-for-kids records include Boyish Hips (1997), Reborn As Bees (1999), Lake Champions (1999), Miraculous Dissolving Cures (2001), Perfect Gentleman (2004), Ancient Ruins (2008), Durango (2008), and Songs For Old Lovers (2011). Randy has also released several digital singles, including "Don't Fill Up On Chips," "Nagasaki," "On the Phone on the Toilet," and "Hugs for My Family, High Fives for My Friends."

Randy's songs have been included on many compilations, including those for Putumayo World Music, Fast Folk, and Park Slope Parents.

== History ==
Kaplan grew up in Dix Hills, Long Island around the corner from the landmark John Coltrane House. He studied philosophy, writing, and literature at The University of Michigan in Ann Arbor and at UCLA. He then trained in acting, improvisation, and writing with Scott Bernstein in Los Angeles. Randy's theater credits include Spring Awakening, Fifty Minutes, and The Fresca Wars. He has also acted in films (Never Say Goodbye, Missing Parents) and on television shows such as Beauty and the Beast, Growing Pains, A Different World, and the short-lived Ferris Beuller.

Kaplan fronted the band “i” in Los Angeles for several years in the early 1990s. They performed at LA clubs such as The Troubadour, The Whisky-A-Go-Go, and The Roxy and at many other venues on the West Coast and in the Southwest sharing bills with bands and performers such as The Mother Hips, Chuck E. Weiss, Eleni Mandell, Dan Bern, and Andras Jones and the Previous.

In 1993 Randy moved to New York City. He lived and worked on the Lower East Side and performed at venues such as Sin-é, The Living Room, and The Bottom Line. He released his first CD, Boyish Hips, in 1997. He has toured extensively throughout the US, appearing at clubs, cafes, bars, and roadhouses in more than thirty states. Randy has lived in New York, California, Kansas, and Michigan.

Kaplan has had his poetry published by Ugly Duckling Presse and The Missing Slate and has received several ASCAP awards for his work. He began his Children's Music career in Park Slope, Brooklyn in 2005, working at Beansprouts preschool and performing weekly concerts at Perch Cafe.

Randy collaborated with Brian & Erin Schey on CLEAVE, a musical comedy that was staged at The Boulder International Fringe Festival in Colorado in 2008 and in which Randy co-starred.

Randy lives in a Detroit suburb with his wife and son.

== Work ==
In his songs for children and their families, Randy Kaplan blends American Roots, Country Blues, and Comedic Storytelling. He fingerpicks his way through unpredictable, sold out, live shows, which in addition to his original compositions include Broadway numbers, Delta Blues songs, and Ragtime tunes. “He doesn’t dumb it down for the kids....He just expects them to come along for the ride. And they do,” says Time Out New York Kids. Randy plans to record his sixth not-JUST-for-kids CD in August 2016.

Randy's work has been awarded top honors from NAPPA (National Parenting Publication Awards), been voted a Top Five CD in the Nickelodeon Parents' Picks Awards, been featured prominently in children's magazines and on family websites, and has appeared on the Top Ten lists of NPR, People magazine, Time Out New York Kids, Fids & Kamily, Zooglobble, OWTK, Family Man Online (where it was also awarded the #1 spot), and many others. His recordings have appeared on compilations such as Putumayo's American Playground and Many Hands: Family Music for Haiti. Randy's song "No Nothing" was nominated for Best Children's Song of the Year by Just Plain Folks and his "The Ladybug Without Spots" was the NAEYC (National Association for the Education of Young Children) Song of the Month in May 2013.

For the past decade and a half, Randy has worked with folk and bluegrass master Mike West who produces and records Randy's CDs in Lawrence, Kansas at his 9th Ward Pickin' Parlor. Parenting magazine called Randy “one of the most exciting newcomers to kids’ music since Dan Zanes” while his hometown zine, The Brooklyn Paper, called him "a national treasure who brings a sly wink to the art of kid's music."

All of Randy's family CDs and some of his non-kids CDs have been recorded by bluegrass master Mike West (of Truckstop Honeymoon) in Lawrence, Kansas.

Randy released his sixth not-JUST-for-kids CD, TRIPPIN' ROUND THE MITTEN, in 2017. The record features SiriusXM hits "Sugar," "Mr. Spaceman," and "On the Phone on the Toilet." On his [[]] blog, Jeff Bogle wrote: "Now that Kaplan’s a father, he’s got an even more constant stream of inspiration. Kaplan has excellent taste in cover songs [and] a sharp parodic ear, reworking “Mr. Bass Man” into "Mr. Spaceman" (hi, Elon Musk!) and turning Maroon 5's "Sugar"'s inappropriate-for-a-four-year-old's lyrics into an ode to a four-year-old's favorite ingredient. ... And in the case of Kaplan's “On the Phone on the Toilet,” the salty and sweet are inextricably mixed. Kaplan doesn't change his formula here, but when the formula works well as it does again, I'm OK with that. Longtime fans will dig in; if you're new to Kaplan, this album is a fine place to start."

Randy Kaplan released his fifth not-JUST-for-kids CD, JAM ON RYE, in June, 2014. The record features its share of Kaplan's trademark fast-talking/half-singing rap-bluegrass barnburners, a Dan Bern cover, a calypso tune, a Tin Pan Alley gem, a couple of lullabies, and the single "Don't Fill Up On Chips" which was a smash hit on SiriusXM Radio's Kids Place Live. New York magazine raves, “Roots rocker Randy Kaplan is one of those happy-they-exist people you can't quite tell is playing kids’ music. And yet he is.”

Randy's fourth not-JUST-for-kids CD, MR. DIDDIE WAH DIDDIE, was released in July, 2012 by My Kazoo Music and Universal Music (UMe). The album consists of Randyized versions of classic Country Blues and Ragtime numbers originally performed by the likes of Robert Johnson, Blind Boy Fuller, Blind Blake, Muddy Waters, Bessie Smith, Mississippi John Hurt, and many more. In their August 6 issue, People implored parents to "take (their) kids on a time warp with (Randy's) collection of blues and ragtime numbers from the early 20th century" and placed the CD 3rd on their list of "8 Cool Kids' Albums" of the summer.

Randy's third not-JUST-for-kids CD, THE KIDS ARE ALL ID (2010), won top honors from NAPPA, their Gold Award, was voted a Top Five CD in the NICKELODEON Parents' Picks Awards, and appeared on the Top Ten CDs of 2010 lists of FIDS & KAMILIES, TIME OUT NEW YORK KIDS, ZOOGLOBBLE, OWTK, and FAMILY MAN ONLINE (where it was awarded the #1 slot)! "For all of its ability to capture children's perspectives and parents' experiences this (album) is one of the best I have ever heard. You need to hear it too," raved Family Man Online. The record features all-time classics like Bob Dylan's "Forever Young," "I Got Plenty O' Nuttin'" (from Porgy & Bess), and "The Derby Ram" (George Washington's favorite folk song). There are also three songs based on the classic picture books of Ezra Jack Keats.

“LOQUAT ROOFTOP (2008), Randy’s second kids’ CD, contains its share of classics, such as Charlie Brown, Move It On Over, and Tomorrow (from Annie) and original songs like "No Nothing" (the tale of the depraved cat “Nothing” and the hungry monkey “Kqxhc” – you'll have to hear the song to see how his name's pronounced!), the eponymous "Loquat Rooftop", and "The Ladybug Without Spots" (after an ill-advised watermelon seed gluing spree a ladybug devoid of polka dots learns to accept her spotless self). “Loquat Rooftop (is a) mixture of blues and folk-rock, laced with good humor and heart” (ZOOGLOBBLE.com) and was voted one of the Top Ten Children's CDs of 2008 by NPR (NATIONAL PUBLIC RADIO) and COOL MOM PICKS. “No Nothing” and “The Ladybug Without Spots” are among the most requested songs on SIRIUS-XM Radio's Kids Place Live.

“FIVE CENT PIECE (2006) combines a collection of oldies (and originals)” (NEW YORK MAGAZINE), featuring classics like "Over the Rainbow", "Kids" (from Bye Bye Birdie), and "You Can't Always Get What You Want" (a good first mantra for children) as well as original songs like "Shampoo Me" (the account of the friendly but demanding shark in the bathtub), "Mosquito Song", and "Roaches" (they're tryin' on your underwear, checkin' out your grocery list, readin' your copy of Metamorphosis).

Randy's Not-REALLY-For-Kids CDs:

SONGS FOR OLD LOVERS (2011) is a true concept album which pays tribute to some of the earliest concept albums in American pop music history. Randy's original compositions are responses to songs from the 1930s and 40s, standards recorded by the likes of Frank Sinatra, Peggy Lee, Chet Baker, and Nat King Cole. There are nods to the songwriting styles of the day throughout, both harmonically and lyrically. (adapted from the liner notes by Montague Z. Young)

DURANGO (2008), a collection of 11 songs Randy co-wrote with Brian Schey over the past two decades, was released in November 2008. The record is bookended by two jazz/pop piano-based songs, the title track and "No Matter What" (which also appeared on the CD REBORN AS BEES in 1999). There are also skewed rock anthems, Mexican surf numbers, and cabaret-influenced ballads. Brian Schey is an accomplished composer, arranger, and producer who has toured the US and Europe as a bassist with, among others, Dan Bern and Great American Taxi. Randy and Brian have worked together in many styles, from rock to jazz to musical theater. Brian's latest project is RUE, a gypsy-jazz-influenced band he formed with Erin Schey.

ANCIENT RUINS (2008) contains several bluegrass numbers - fiddle, banjo, guitar, upright bass and all- but there's also the trademark Kaplan unorthodox ballads and anthemic rock songs. Along with his ten originals, Kaplan covers Nirvana's "On a Plain," Prince's "I Could Never Take the Place of Your Man," and Grandmaster Flash's "The Message" (transforming the old school rap classic into a bluegrass barnburner).

For his CD PERFECT GENTLEMAN (2004) Randy amassed a collection of cheap yard-sale organs. He used their built-in drum samples to create rhythm tracks; he then utilized these rock, jazz, waltz, swing, bossa nova, dixie, cha-cha, and rhumba beats to fashion songs ranging from simply-structured folk and country ballads to torch songs, lampoons, spirituals, and satires. By editing, manipulating, and overlapping the beats from these various 1970s organs Randy transformed the crude and kitschy samples into more polished and developed sounds. At times, though, he just placed a sound 'as is' into a new context. The characters who inhabit these songs often seek to gain mastery over their chronic pathologies, or at least to acknowledge them. These characters include an anti-prophet who asks only that he be given as big a funeral as Jesus and Moses, an overweight middle-aged man who carries around a picture of his shirtless teen-aged self in order to lure women, and the ghosts of Edith Wharton and Alexander Hamilton.

MIRACULOUS DISSOLVING CURES (2001) is a musically rich collection of threnodies and noiresque tales that find Kaplan battling the forces of love and loss as well as the hypocrisy of both the secular and religious worlds. Stylistically, the record ranges from the quasi-Latin beat of "Crushed Berries" to the hint of electronica in "The Girl Who's Done It All" to the irresistible mix of synthesizer and Spanish guitar throughout "Unpaid Bills." There's also a full-color 12-page CD booklet featuring abstract paintings (by Yasmina Palumbo, Leila Hamilton, Masha Solomon, Lucille Dreyblatt, and others) juxtaposed to the words for each song. MDC was recorded by Colin Mahoney in Lawrence, Kansas.

In 1999 Randy released two albums simultaneously, REBORN AS BEES and LAKE CHAMPIONS. Both were recorded at Z'gwon, th Studios in Lawrence, Kansas by Colin Mahoney, who also played drums. BEES was created as a tribute to Randy's father, who died in an automobile accident in the summer of 1997, and as an investigation of grief and hope. It is an eloquently dark and sometimes angry record. REBORN AS BEES, whose title comes from a Chasidic saying via Martin Buber, is a true concept album. LAKE CHAMPIONS was recorded during the REBORN AS BEES sessions and features Randy, his guitar, voice, and harmonica only.

In early 1997, Randy recorded BOYISH HIPS at his friend Scott Bernstein's Hollywood apartment on his Tascam 4-track cassette recorder. On the record, his first CD, Randy used guitar, harmonica, piano, Fender Rhodes, and pots & pans as percussion instruments to orchestrate a joyful, Caribbeanesque sound. This deceptively light collection of songs includes "Slow Eater," in which a man denies being a binger and instead blames others for eating too slowly and too sparsely. In "Everyone I See," a man employs skewed logic to defend his inability to commit himself to one woman. In "Ten Page Letter," a woman demands "action not words" from a man who can do nothing about his feelings but express them in letters. "Send For Our Stuff" is both a love song and a tribute to the naive beauty of Los Angeles. This experimental album is full of lyrical and emotional minefields and fraught with neurotic wit, unbridled perplexity, and desperate passions.

== Discography ==
- Shake It and Break It (2019 - forthcoming FAMILY CD)
- "Hugs for My Family, High Fives for My Friends" (2018 - FAMILY mp3 single)
- Trippin' Round the Mitten (2017 - FAMILY CD)
- "On the Phone on the Toilet" (2016 - FAMILY mp3 single)
- Jam on Rye (2014 - FAMILY CD)
- Mr. Diddie Wah Diddie (2012 - FAMILY CD)
- "Don't Fill Up On Chips" (2011 - FAMILY mp3 single)
- "Nagasaki" (2011 - FAMILY mp3 single)
- Songs for Old Lovers (2011)
- The Kids Are All Id (2010 – FAMILY CD)
- Durango (2008)
- Loquat Rooftop (2008 – FAMILY CD)
- Ancient Ruins (2008)
- Five Cent Piece (2006 – FAMILY CD)
- Perfect Gentleman (2004)
- Miraculous Dissolving Cures (2001)
- Lake Champions (1999)
- Reborn As Bees (1999)
- Boyish Hips (1997)

== Music videos ==
- Crew Cut (Matt Kiel)
- Ice Cream Man Rag (myKaZootv)
- The Ladybug Without Spots (Mindsmack TV)
- I'm Not Hungry (Gabriel Leigh)
- Why the Angels Eat (Gabriel Leigh)
- FORKS (Fans Of Randy Kaplan) have also created many videos for Randy's not-JUST-for-kids songs
