= Frank and Deane =

American music and entertainment duo

FRANK & DEANE
- Years active: 2016-Present
- Members: Jonathan Frank; Josh Deane
- Website: FRANK & DEANE

Frank and Deane (stylized as FRANK & DEANE) are a music and entertainment duo “For the KID in all of us!” from Nashville, Tennessee, via Virginia and Texas, who formed in 2016 after the passing of one of their best friends, Justin Burns. The duo performs as caricatures of themselves and consists of Jonathan Frank (lead vocals, guitar, and all other instruments) and Josh Deane (lead vocals, guitar, and all other instruments), and it's been said that it's never quite clear where reality ends and fiction begins. Their music, which Colorado Parent described as "reminiscent of the Beach Boys" is a unique blend of rock, pop, acoustic guitars, tight harmonies, and catchy melodies. Often compared to Pixar because of their content, quality, and presentation, FRANK & DEANE's various works (music, art, videos, shows, and more) are intended to be "enjoyed by a broad audience of every generation of kids, parents, and grandparents." They have devoted fans of all ages. Fatherly declared their "songs are catchy and something as a parent you won't mind having on repeat."

FRANK & DEANE met in college at Belmont University in Music City and collaborated on many projects creatively, including their previous band, Johnny On The Spot, until ultimately heading their separate ways after college. 14 years later, after the funeral of Justin Burns, they felt called and compelled to form FRANK & DEANE and immediately started working on their first album.

The debut album release, FRANK & DEANE PRESENT: THE NATION OF IMAGINE was nominated for Best Children's Album for the 61st Grammy Awards. The album consists of 10 songs in a variety of styles and features many different instruments "virtuosically played by the duo themselves." The songs are tied together by 10 seamless interludes which consist of a wide spectrum of entertaining content from live radio show drop-ins, to 50's style commercials, to theme songs for alien socks, and more.

Playtime Playlist called the FRANK & DEANE PRESENT: THE NATION OF IMAGINE album "an upbeat collection of kid-friendly music with a great sense of humor that you’ll want to listen all the way through." The song list, including: "My Imagination," "¡Holy Guacamole!," "I Blew My Kazoo at the Zoo," and "Golden Rule," among others, promotes universal themes of: kindness, creativity, fun, and imagination, which the duo feel are an important element of their music. The album has also been described as “a musical sugar high” by Red Tricycle.

"I Blew My Kazoo at the Zoo" was awarded the Grand Prize in the 2019 John Lennon Songwriting Contest Session I. This win was followed by "¡Holy Guacamole!" also earning the Grand Prize in Session II. "¡Holy Guacamole!" went on to win the 2019 Lennon Award.
