= Kids Place Live =

American radio channel

Kids Place
- Broadcast area: United States; Canada
- Frequency: SiriusXM 134
- Branding: Kids Place

Programming
- Format: Children's radio

Ownership
- Owner: Sirius XM Radio

History
- First air date: 2001-09-25
- Former frequencies: SiriusXM 78

Technical information
- Class: Satellite Radio Station

Links
- Website: Official website

Former XM Logo as XM Kids

Kids Place (formerly Kids Place Live) is a Sirius XM Radio station on channel 134, that is the result of a merger between XM Kids and Kids Stuff. This was a result of the U.S. Federal Communications Commission (FCC) approving the acquisition of XM Satellite Radio Holding, Inc. by Sirius Satellite Radio, Inc. on July 29, 2008, 17 months after the companies first proposed the merger. Until February 9, 2010, DirecTV carried this on channel 868, but dropped SiriusXM programming in favor of going to SonicTap. The channel name was changed on 2008-11-12.

Artists that are on the playlist include Andrew & Polly, Imagination Movers, The Brak Show, Tom Chapin, Parry Gripp, The Okee Dokee Brothers, Danny Weinkauf, Randy Kaplan, They Might Be Giants, The Pop Ups, Frances England, Recess Monkey, Emma Roberts, Justin Roberts, Rocknoceros, Secret Agent 23 Skidoo, SpongeBob SquarePants, SteveSongs, The Story Pirates, Trout Fishing in America, The Wiggles and "Weird Al" Yankovic.

== Layoffs ==
The channel's staff was reduced throughout 2023 and 2024 and now consists of mostly automated music. Since 2026, a portion of the daily programming consists of a simulcast with the Sirius "Disney Hits" channel.

Recent programming decisions at Kids Place Live reflect a move away from curator-driven support of children's artists toward automated scheduling of soundtrack and adult-originated content, altering the channel's role in the children's music ecosystem

== Characters ==
There are several animal characters that previously appeared during "The Animal Farm with Kenny Curtis" that interacted with callers on the show and Kenny Curtis. The featured animals included: Dirk, the fourth and forgotten Chipmunk; Forrest Skunk, a kid version of Forrest Gump; Greg the tree sloth; Lufa the Porcupine; Bear E. White, a polar bear; and Lorenzo Llama, who has a strong fear of being touched. These characters were abruptly removed from programming along with Kenny Curtis' show in February, 2024.

== Programming ==
=== Current Programming ===
- Absolutely Mindy Show with Mindy Thomas (2001–present)
- Couch Potato Stew (2008–present)
- The Kids Place (formerly Automatik), (2024–present)
- National Geographic Weird But True! (2016–present)
- Hot Lunch (2020–present)

=== Former Programming ===
- Animal Farm with Kenny Curtis (2001–2024)
- Live From the Monkey House with Jack Forman (2013–2024)
- Flip & Mozi's Guide to How to Be an Earthling (2023)
- The Activity Bus (2023–2024)
- Sugar Rush (2023–2024)
- Wheel of Callers (2023–2024)
- Weekend Party Mix with DJ Willy Wow (2021–2023)
- Everyday Birthday Party with Laurie Berkner (2009–2011)
- Kids Stuff (2001–2008)
- Robbie Schafer's BandWagon (2009–2013)
- RS's Stuck in a Real Tall Tree (2001–2009)
- Story Pirates Radio (2013–2015)
- The Wiggles Radio Show (2012–2014)
- Putumayo Kids World Playground (2012–2019)
- Kidz Bop BLOCK PARTY! (2012–2019)
- Rumpus Room Concert Show (2001–2019)
