= Sugar Free Allstars =

- Origin: Oklahoma City, Oklahoma, United States
- Genres: Children's Music, Kindie rock, Funk, Blues, Soul
- Years active: 2000–Present
- Label: Wiser Music
- Members: Chris "Boom" Wiser; Rob "Dr. Rock" Martin
- Past members: Mike Satawake; Andy Moore

Sugar Free Allstars are an American band founded in Oklahoma City, Oklahoma, in 2001. Currently consisting of vocalist-keyboardist Chris Wiser and drummer Rob Martin, they most recently have toured as an act focused on entertaining children.

== Biography ==
=== 2000–2003: Three-piece ===
Originally formed as three-piece consisting of Chris Wiser on keyboards, Mike Satawake on guitars, and Andy Moore on drums, the Sugar Free Allstars formed their early sound based on funk and soul and showcased their eclectic, groove-oriented style that they are known for. They issued their first self-titled album, Sugar Free AllStars, in 2003.

=== 2003–2007: Evolution ===
Leading up to the release of their second album, Dos Machos, Moore departed and was replaced by Rob "Dr. Rock" Martin. The subsequent loss of their guitarist led to the band playing in their more familiar two-piece format. The band also released Return of Dos Machos before abandoning their adult themed lyrics in favor of their current music which is intended to be enjoyed by the whole family. Despite music from this period appearing on the jambands.com Top 30 and shows like Roadtrip Nation, the band has largely disowned their prior work and it only receives a passing mention on their current website.

=== 2007–Present: Playing for Families ===
The band released their first children's album Dos Ninos in 2007. The success of this record inspired the band to continue their experiment with children's music and led to more success with Funky Fresh and Sugar Free. These developments coincided with the growing Kindie rock movement that they have embraced. In 2012 they released their third children's album, All On A Sunday Afternoon and an eponymous follow-up in 2016.

== Band members ==
=== Current members ===
- Chris Wiser – Hammond B3, Saxophone, Vocals (2000–present)
- Rob Martin – Drums, Backing Vocals (2001–present)

=== Former Members ===
- Mike Satawake – Guitar (2000–2003)
- Andy Moore – Drums (2000–2001)

== Discography ==
=== For Grown-Ups ===
- Sugar Free Allstars (2001)
- Dos Machos (2004)
- Return of Dos Machos (2007)

=== For Families ===
- Dos Ninos (2007)
- Funky Fresh and Sugar Free (2010)
- All On A Sunday Afternoon (2012)
- Sugar Free Allstars (2016)
