= Now or Never (Billie Holiday song) =

Single by Billie Holiday
- A-side: Gimme a Pigfoot (And a Bottle of Beer)
- Recorded: September 30, 1949
- Genre: Jazz
- Length: 2:32
- Label: Decca
- Songwriter(s): Billie Holiday; Curtis Reginald Lewis

"Now or Never" is a jazz song written by singer Billie Holiday, and composer Curtis Reginald Lewis.

== Recording session ==
Studio Session No. 63, New York City, September 30, 1949, Sy Oliver and His Orchestra (Decca), with Bernie Privin (trumpet), Sid Cooper, Johnny Mince (alto saxophone), Artie Drellinger, Pat Nizza (tenor saxophone), Billy Kyle (piano), Everett Barksdale (guitar), Joe Benjamin (bass), Jimmy Crawford (drums), and Billie Holiday (vocal).

== Notable cover versions ==
- Nnenna Freelon (2005)
