= David Levine =

American caricaturist (1926–2009)

- Levine circa 1976–1980
- Born: December 20, 1926; Brooklyn, New York, U.S.
- Died: December 29, 2009 (aged 83); New York City, U.S.
- Education: Pratt Institute; Temple University's Tyler School of Art; Hans Hofmann
- Known for: Illustration
- Notable work: The New York Review of Books caricatures

David Levine (December 20, 1926 – December 29, 2009) was an American artist and illustrator best known for his caricatures in The New York Review of Books. Jules Feiffer has called him "the greatest caricaturist of the last half of the 20th Century".

== Early life and education ==
Levine was born in Brooklyn, where his father Harry ran a small clothing factory. His mother, Lena, was a nurse and political activist who had communist sympathies. He began to draw as a child, displaying a precocious talent that, at the age of nine, won him an invitation to audition for an animator's position in Disney's Los Angeles Studios.

Levine later studied painting at Pratt Institute, at Temple University's Tyler School of Art in Philadelphia in 1946, and with Hans Hofmann. Immediately following World War II, Levine served in the U. S. Army. After his service, he graduated from Temple with a degree in education and completed his studies at its Tyler School.

== Career ==
Levine initially hoped to be a full-time painter, but was often forced to subsist on illustration work from publications like Gasoline Retailer. Nevertheless, he turned out a body of paintings, although many of these were destroyed in a fire in 1968. Levine's paintings are mostly watercolors that often depict garment workers, honoring his father's employees, and bathers at Coney Island. The paintings, in contrast to his illustrations, are "sympathetic portraits of ordinary citizens, fond and respectful renderings of the distinctive seaside architecture, panoramas with people on the beach." Levine, together with Aaron Shikler founded the Painting Group in 1958, a salon of artists with whom he gathered for fifty years to paint models. The group was the subject of a 2007 documentary called Portraits of a Lady, which followed their creation of simultaneous portraits of U. S. Supreme Court Justice Sandra Day O'Connor.

A job at Esquire in the early 1960s saw Levine develop his skills as a political illustrator. His first work for The New York Review of Books appeared in 1963, just a few months after the paper was founded. Subsequently, he drew more than 3,800 pen-and-ink caricatures of famous writers, artists and politicians for the publication. Levine would review a draft of the article to be illustrated, together with photos or other images sent by the staff of the Review. Within a few days, he would return a finished drawing that caught "a large fact about his subject's character"; "his brilliance lay in weaving [the article's] ideas with his own". Only about half of Levine's caricatures were created for the Review. Other work has appeared in Esquire (over 1,000 drawings), The New York Times, The Washington Post, Rolling Stone, Sports Illustrated, New York, Time, Newsweek, The New Yorker, The Nation, Playboy, and others.

As a caricaturist for these publications, Levine distinguished his process from that of political cartoonists: "I could take time to really look it over and think about it, read the articles and so on. The political cartoonists don't get a chance. The headlines are saying this and this about so-and-so, and you have to come up with something which is approved by an editor. I almost never had to get an approval. In forty years I may have run into a disagreement with The New York Review maybe two times." However, as his son Matthew Levine wrote in 1979, on at least three occasions The New York Times refused to print works it had specifically commissioned David Levine to draw for its op-ed page, including cartoons of Henry Kissinger, Richard Nixon, and former New York mayor Ed Koch.

In 1967, he was elected into the National Academy of Design as an Associate member and became a full Academician in 1971. Levine's work has been exhibited extensively in galleries and museums around the world, and several collections of his paintings and drawings have been published by the Review and elsewhere, such as The Arts of David Levine, published by Knopf in 1978. In 2008, he published a book, American Presidents, featuring his drawings of U.S. Presidents over five decades, which was also the basis for an exhibit at the New York Public Library.

== Reputation ==
John Updike, whom Levine drew many times, wrote in the 1970s: "Besides offering us the delight of recognition, his drawings comfort us, in an exacerbated and potentially desperate age, with the sense of a watching presence, an eye informed by an intelligence that has not panicked, a comic art ready to encapsulate the latest apparitions of publicity as well as those historical devils who haunt our unease. Levine is one of America's assets. In a confusing time, he bears witness. In a shoddy time, he does good work."

The New York Times described Levine's illustrations as "macro-headed, somberly expressive, astringently probing and hardly ever flattering caricatures of intellectuals and athletes, politicians and potentates" that were "heavy in shadows cast by outsize noses on enormous, eccentrically shaped heads, and replete with exaggeratedly bad haircuts, 5 o'clock shadows, ill-conceived mustaches and other grooming foibles ... to make the famous seem peculiar-looking in order to take them down a peg". The paper commented: "His work was not only witty but serious, not only biting but deeply informed, and artful in a painterly sense as well as a literate one." Levine drew his most frequent subject, former president Richard M. Nixon, 66 times, depicting him as, among other things, the Godfather, Captain Queeg, and a fetus.

According to Vanity Fair, "Levine put together a facebook of human history ... the durability of those Levine depicted, plus the unique insight with which he drew them, guarantees the immortality of his works". Levine's work, taken as a whole, had a leftwing bent, and he claimed still to be a communist, although people of all political persuasions came in for the same acid treatment in Levine's caricatures. Levine said that "by making the powerful funny-looking ... he might encourage some humility or self-awareness". Levine also described his purpose as follows: "Caricature is a form of hopeful statement: I'm drawing this critical look at what you're doing, and I hope that you will learn something from what I'm doing."

== Last years and death ==
In 2006, Levine was diagnosed with macular degeneration, an eye disease that leads to blindness. While the Review continued to run Levine's older work, no new work appeared there after April 2007.

On December 29, 2009, Levine died at New York Presbyterian Hospital at the age of 83. His death was caused by prostate cancer and a number of subsequent illnesses. He was survived by his second wife, Kathy Hayes (whom he married in 1996) and his two children.

== See also ==
- List of caricaturists

== Bibliography ==
- Levine, David (1966). The Man From M.A.L.I.C.E. Clark, Irwin & Co., Ltd.
- Levine, David (1969). Pens and Needles. Gambit, Inc.
- Levine, David (1970). No Known Survivors. Gambit, Inc. ISBN 9780876450307.
- Levine, David (1978). The Arts of David Levine. Knoph.
- Levine, David (2008). American Presidents. Eros Comix.
