= Love (Sesame Street album) =

Studio album by Sesame Street
- Released: 1980
- Label: Children's Television Workshop

Love (styled L♥VE on the front cover) is a record album featuring the cast of Sesame Street. It was released in 1980. The album received a Grammy award nomination for Best Recording For Children, but lost to In Harmony: A Sesame Street Record.

== Songs ==
Side A (Performers)

1. Love (The Kids)
2. Wonderful Me (Big Bird)
3. The Things I Love (Oscar the Grouch)
4. Do You Like Me (Bert and Ernie)
5. I Love a Waltz (The Count)
6. The Lovable Monsters of Sesame Street (from The Sesame Street Monsters)
7. Bert's Love Song (Bert)
8. I Just Adore 4 (Big Bird and The Tarnish Brothers) (from The Count Counts)

Side B (Performers)

1. I Love When it Rains (Bob with Oscar)
2. A Really Good Feeling (Big Bird) (from Bert And Ernie Sing-along)
3. I Love a March (Ernie And Bert)
4. Filling the Air with Love (Olivia)
5. Transylvania Love Call (The Countess and the Count)
6. The Happiest Street in the World (Big Bird) (from Sesame Disco!)
