= List of Kids' Praise! albums =

This is a list of albums in the Kids' Praise! series. The series features Psalty the Singing Songbook played by Ernie Rettino.

== Kids' Praise! series ==
- The Kids Praise Album!: An Explosion of Happiness! (1980)
- Kids' Praise! Christmas: Psalty's Christmas Calamity (1982)
- Kids Praise! 3: Funtastic Family! (1982)
- Kids Praise! 4: Singsational Servants! (1984)
- Kids Praise! 5: Psalty's Camping Adventure ... Count It All Joy! (1985)
- Kids Praise! 6: Heart to Change to the World! (1987)
- Kids Praise! 7: Psalty's Hymnological Adventure Through Time (1988)
- Kids Praise! 8: Play Ball! (1989)
- Psalty's Kids & Co! 10: Salvation Celebration! (1990)
- The Search for Psalty's Missing 9 (1991)

== Psalty's Sleepytime Helpers series ==
- Psalty's Sleepytime Helpers - Episode 1: Baby Birdy Bomber (1986)
- Psalty's Sleepytime Helpers - Episode 2: Rough Ridin' Rodeo (1986)
- Psalty's Sleepytime Helpers - Episode 3: Kids Praise Parade (1986)
- Psalty's Sleepytime Helpers - Episode 4: Blooper's Blooper (1986)
- Psalty's Sleepytime Helpers - Episode 5: Caper At The Castle (1986)
- Psalty's Sleepytime Helpers - Episode 6: Uh oh, Art Projects! (1986)
- Psalty's Sleepytime Helpers - Episode 7: Fear Fighting Farley (1986)

== Other Psalty albums ==
- The Big Adventures of Little Psalty (1981)
- Psalty's Songs for Li'l Praisers 1989)
- Psalty's Family Christmas Sing Along (1983)
- Charity Churchmouse On The Front Line (1984)
- Pow-Pow-Power! To Live God's Way (1984)
- Psalty's Non-Stop Sing-A-Long (1988)
- Psalty's Mighty-Mini Musicals (1988)
- Psalty's Non-Stop Sing-A-Long 2 ((1991)
- Psalty's Singalongathon Marantha Marathon Hallelujah Jubilee (1995)
- Psalty's All New Praise Party 1 & 2 (1996)
- Songs from Psalty's Kids Bible (2006)
- Faith it! God loves me (2011)

== Videos ==
- Kids' Praise! 4: Singsational Servants (1985)
- Kids' Praise! 5: Psalty's Camping Adventure (1986)
- Psalty's Salvation Celebration: The Movie (1992)
- Psalty's Funtastic Praise Party (1993)
- Psalty's Songs for Li'l Praisers: God Loves Me Sooo Much (1994)
- Psalty's Songs for Li'l Praisers: Follow the Leader, Jesus (1994)
- Psalty's Songs for Li'l Praisers: Jumpin' Up Joy of the Lord (1994)
- Psalty's All-New Praise Party Two (1996)

== Related books ==
- The Booklets - book & audio series
- Solomon the Supersonic Salamander book & audio series (Book: ISBN 978-0-8499-1017-3)

== See also ==
- Colby's Clubhouse television series (Psalty and Psaltina appeared in episode 5 of season 1, "Check Your Connection".)
- Gerbert television series
