= Phil Freelon =

American architect (1953–2019)

- Born: March 26, 1953; Philadelphia, Pennsylvania, U.S.
- Died: July 9, 2019 (aged 66); Durham, North Carolina, U.S.
- Occupation: Architect
- Spouse: Nnenna Freelon (m. 1979)
- Children: 3

Philip Goodwin Freelon (March 26, 1953 – July 9, 2019) was an American architect. He was best known for leading the design team (with J. Max Bond Jr. of Davis Brody Bond, and David Adjaye) of the Smithsonian Institution's National Museum of African American History and Culture.

Some of his other projects include the Center for Civil & Human Rights, the Reginald F. Lewis Museum of Maryland African American History & Culture and the Museum of the African Diaspora. Freelon was a Fellow of the American Institute of Architects (and the recipient of their Thomas Jefferson Award for Public Architecture), and a LEED (Leadership in Energy and Environmental Design) Accredited Professional. In 2012, President Barack Obama appointed Freelon to the U.S. Commission of Fine Arts. Freelon was married to six-time Grammy nominated jazz vocalist Nnenna Freelon.

== Early life and education ==
Freelon was a member of the 230th graduating class of Central High School in Philadelphia. He attended Hampton University in Hampton, VA before matriculating at North Carolina State University. Following graduation from North Carolina State University's College of Design with a Bachelor of Environmental Design (Architecture) and top design honors, he went on to earn his Master of Architecture degree from MIT in 1977.

== Career ==
Freelon served as an adjunct professor at the College of Design, North Carolina State University and has been a visiting critic/lecturer at Harvard University, MIT, the University of Maryland, College Park, the University of Utah, the California College of the Arts, Kent State University (Florence Italy, program), Syracuse University, and the New Jersey Institute of Technology, among others. In 1989, Freelon was the recipient of the Loeb Fellowship and spent a year of independent study at the Harvard University Graduate School of Design. Freelon was also a Professor of the Practice at MIT in the School of Architecture and Planning.

=== The Freelon Group ===
Philip Freelon founded The Freelon Group in 1990. Since then, The Freelon Group has expanded to a sixty-member architectural firm located in the Research Triangle Park area of North Carolina. The Freelon Group offers specialized design expertise in the areas of Museum/Cultural Center, Higher Education and Science/Technology facilities. The firm has received over twenty-five regional, state and local AIA design awards including AIA North Carolina’s Outstanding Firm Award in 2001. Between 2006 and 2007, Freelon's designs were honored with seven AIA North Carolina design awards in those two years. In 2008, The Freelon Group was recognized by Contract Magazine as The Designer of the Year.

In 2009, along with partners J. Max Bond Jr. (of Davis Brody Bond) and David Adjaye (of Adjaye Associates), Freelon was selected by unanimous decision to design the Smithsonian National Museum of African American History and Culture. The Museum has five floors above ground and four below. It houses a cafe, educational spaces, exhibition halls and galleries as well as a theater.

In March 2014, The Freelon Group announced a planned acquisition by the global architectural design firm Perkins + Will. Following the close of the transaction, Freelon joined Perkins + Will’s board of directors and became the managing and design director of the firm’s North Carolina practice.

== Awards and recognition ==
- Designer of the Year in Contract magazine, 2008
- First prize in the PPG Furniture Design Competition
- AIA Thomas Jefferson Award for public architecture, 2009
- AIA North Carolina’s Gold Medal, 2010
- Design Guild Award, College of Design at NC State University, 2012
- U.S. Commission of Fine Arts, appointed 2012
- Fellow of the American Institute of Architects
- Kea Distinguished Professor of Architecture at the University of Maryland, 2013

== Legacy ==
Freelon's papers are housed at North Carolina State University Libraries' Special Collections Research Center. In honor of his contributions to the architectural field, the Harvard Graduate School of Design created the Phil Freelon Fellowship Fund. The fund "will provide financial aid to students attending the GSD with the intent to expand academic opportunities for African American and other under-represented architecture and design students." In 2017, inaugural the Phil Freelon Fellowship was awarded to Aria Griffin.

== Personal life ==
Freelon was the grandson of the impressionist painter and educator Allan Randall Freelon. He was married to singer Nnenna Freelon, with whom he had three children: Deen, Maya, and Pierce.

In 2016, Freelon was diagnosed with amyotrophic lateral sclerosis. He died on July 9, 2019, in Durham, North Carolina at the age of 66. Freelon's end-of-life care and terminal struggle with amyotrophic lateral sclerosis was documented on the Independent Lens documentary Matter of Mind: My ALS which originally premiered May 1, 2023 on PBS.
