= Secret Agent 23 Skidoo =

American children's hip-hop musician

- Born: Indiana
- Origin: Asheville, North Carolina

Secret Agent 23 Skidoo or (SAS23) is a Grammy Award-winning hip-hop musician from Asheville, North Carolina, United States. Secret Agent 23 Skidoo has been performing children's music since 2008. He performs hip-hop for children.

After a decade of touring nationally as a rapper and producer in Granola Funk Express, he released his first kids' hip-hop album in 2008.

Secret Agent 23 Skidoo served as the official spokesman for the New York State Library System Children's Summer Reading Program and was the 2010 and PSA spokesman for the US Library System Collaborative Summer Library Program. He has been heard and seen on the radio and in TV commercials nationwide promoting summer reading programs at libraries. He has performed for kids in libraries and schools across the country.

Secret Agent 23 Skidoo actively has also participated in charitable musical activities; these include "Many Hands: Family Music for Haiti", formed in response to the 2010 Haiti earthquake, "Science Fair", a compilation to support science and engineering education for girls, which won a Parents' Choice Award. In 2018, Skidoo contributed to Hold Tight, Shine Bright, an album to benefit detained immigrant children and aid concerts such as the Camp Fire Benefit Jam to help Californians affected by the wildfire.

== Albums ==
He released two albums on Happiness Records, Easy (2008), and Underground Playground (2010). Secret Agent 23 Skidoo has had ten No. 1 radio hits on XM/Sirius Kids Place Live! and has played venues including Kidzapalooza, Austin Kiddie Limits, The Winnipeg Folk Festival, The Philadelphia Zoo, Nyc's Irving Plaza, and the Smithsonian Museum.

Easy, his debut album, encourages kids to be themselves, overcome fears, appreciate family, value healthy living, and to have fun. On Underground Playground, he encourages kids to respect uniqueness and live life to the fullest. The album includes songs such as “Ride the Butterflies”, “Chase the Rain”, “The Whalelephant”, and “Speak the Truth” which features Gift of Gab. The national board of judges for Fids and Kamily poll ranked Underground Playground at #5 for Best Kids and Family Music of 2010.

Make Believers was released in 2012. Themes include curiosity, individuality, and that love is greater than fear. "Magic Beans" dives into the classic tale of Jack and the Beanstalk from a new perspective, "Hot Sauce" encourages kids to try new things, and "Gotta Be You" describes the importance of being the person you would want to befriend. Lastly, "Back Home" is geared towards every listener with a pet.

The Perfect Quirk was released in 2015 and was nominated for a Grammy Award. The album opens with "You're It". "Imaginary Friend" introduces a unique character and mind-opening perspectives and is the inspiration for an animated film.

Infinity Plus One was released in 2017 and was nominated and won a Grammy Award for Best Children's Album. In addition to its space theme, the album includes actual astronomical elements, such as the electromagnetic emanations of Earth, which were recorded by the Voyager spacecraft in 1977.

Wake up the Dream was released in 2018.

== Books ==
- What's It Like In The Stars (2007)
- Weirdo Calhoun and the Odd Men Out (2015)
- Word Is Born (2021)

== Awards ==
At the 59th Grammy Awards, Secret Agent 23 Skidoo was awarded a Grammy for Best Children's Album for his record Infinity Plus One. At the 57th Grammy awards, his record The Perfect Quirk was nominated for Best Children's Album.

His book Weirdo Calhoun and the Odd Men Out won Silver at the 2014 Moonbeam Awards.

== Discography ==
- 2008 Easy
- 2010 Underground Playground
- 2012 Make Believers
- 2014 The Perfect Quirk
- 2016 Infinity Plus One
- 2017 Mozartistic (with Asheville Symphony Orchestra)
- 2018 Wake Up the Dream
- 2020 The Figments of Polyglot: Mixtapes 1-12
- 2021 The Beat Bach Symphonies (with Asheville Symphony Orchestra)

== Collaborations ==
=== Albums ===
- 2010 Many Hands: Family Music for Haiti
- 2011 All About Bullies, Big and Small
- 2012 Science Fair
- 2018 Hold Tight, Shine Bright

=== Songs ===
- 2011 – “Look Both Ways” with Egg
- 2011 – “Froggie Went A Courtin’” with Joanie Leeds and the Nightlights
- 2011 – “Cooperate” with Sugar Free Allstars
- 2014 – “Together” with Moona Luna
- 2014 – “You Are Beautiful” with Robbie Schaefer
- 2015 – “I <3 Ur Face” with Josh and the Jamtones
- 2018 – “Are You Afraid of the Dark?” with Lucy Kalantari and the Jazz Cats
- 2019 – “Rock This World”, with Mista Cookie Jar
- 2019 – “Shadow” with The Pop Ups
- 2019 – “Everybody’s Crazy” with Formidable Vegetable
- 2019 – “Leaders of the World” with Renee & Friends, Addi Rose and Amelia Dektor
- 2020 – “Laugh At Life” with Secret Agent Hi-Fi
