= Nnenna Freelon =

American jazz singer and composer (born 1954)

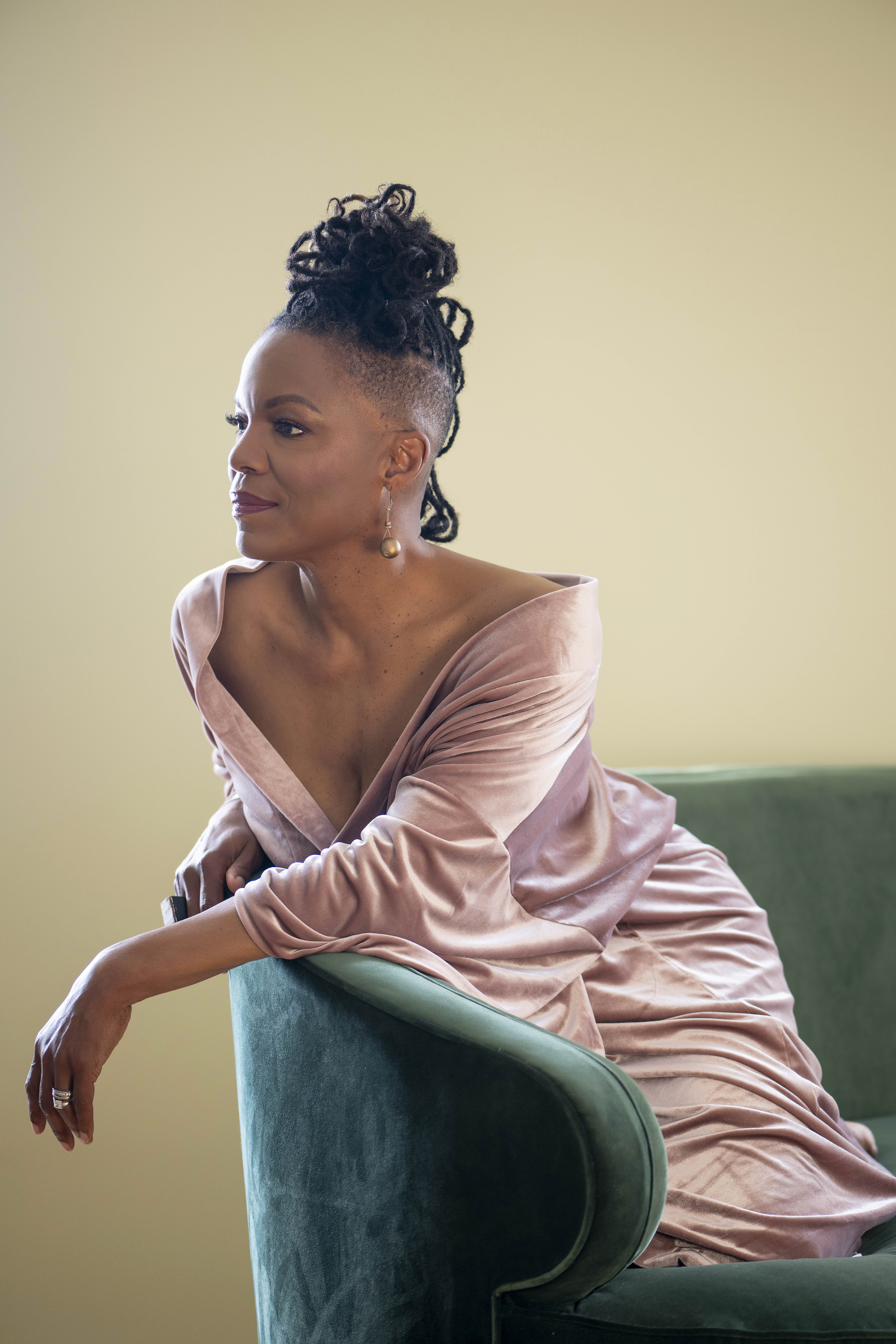

Background information
- Born: July 28, 1954 (age 72); Cambridge, Massachusetts, U.S.
- Genres: Jazz, pop
- Occupation: Singer
- Years active: 1992–present
- Labels: Concord, Columbia, Origin Records
- Website: nnenna.com

Nnenna Freelon (born July 28, 1954) is an American jazz singer, composer, producer, and arranger.

== Early life and education ==
Freelon was born Chinyere Nnenna Pierce to Charles and Frances Pierce in Cambridge, Massachusetts, where she was raised. She has a brother Melvin and a sister named Debbie. As a young woman, she sang extensively in her community and the Union Baptist Church and at St. Paul AME. She recalled, "I started singing in the church, like so many others...." Nnenna graduated from Simmons College in Boston with a degree in health care administration. For a while she worked for the Durham County Hospital Corporation, Durham, North Carolina.

She suggests that her influences included several "not famous people" as well as Nina Simone and Billy Eckstine, whose records her parents played at home. "It's important to expose your children to a wide musical environment," she says. "I did something that my grandmother told me: 'Bloom where you're planted', 'don't get on a bus and go to New York or L.A., sing where you are'."

== Career ==
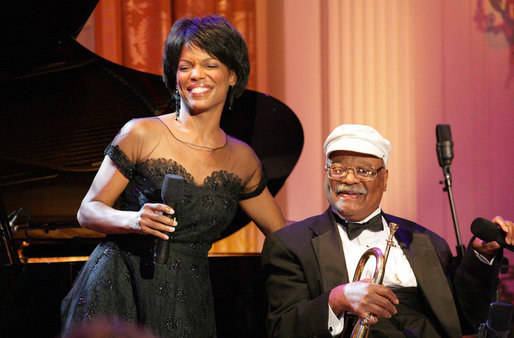
Freelon at the White House with Clark Terry in 2006

In 1990, Nnenna Freelon went to the Southern Arts Federation's jazz meeting and met Ellis Marsalis. "That was a big turning point. At that time, I had been singing for seven years. Ellis is an educator and he wanted to nurture and help. What I didn't know at the time was that George Butler of Columbia Records was looking for a female singer. Ellis asked me for a package of materials. I had my little local press kit and my little tape with original music. Two years later, I was signed to Columbia Records." She was in her late 30s when she made her debut CD, Nnenna Freelon, for Columbia in 1992. The label dropped her in 1994, and Concord Records signed her in 1996.

She has worked with Ray Charles, Ellis Marsalis, Al Jarreau, Anita Baker, Aretha Franklin, Dianne Reeves, Diana Krall, Ramsey Lewis, George Benson, Clark Terry, Herbie Hancock, and Terence Blanchard. She has performed at Carnegie Hall, Hollywood Bowl, Ellington Jazz Festival, Monterey Jazz Festival, Apollo Theater, Montreux Jazz Festival, John F. Kennedy Center for the Performing Arts.

== Babysong workshops ==
Freelon is the national spokesperson for the National Association of Partners in Education, an organization with over 400,000 school and community partnership programs across the United States, dedicated to arts education. Freelon has maintained ties to her hospital-work as her jazz career has flourished. Her Babysong workshops, which she started at Duke University Medical Center in 1990, teach young mothers and healthcare providers the importance of the human voice for healing and nurturing. She emphasizes the importance of parents singing to children to enhance brain development.

== Personal life ==
In 1979, she married architect Philip Freelon. She and her husband raised three children, Deen, Maya and Pierce, before she decided to perform professionally as a jazz singer. Their son Pierce Freelon is a hip hop artist, a Visiting Professor of Political Science at North Carolina Central University and the founder of the website Blackademics, for which he has interviewed many notable figures such as Angela Davis, Maya Angelou, Nikki Giovanni, and Jesse Jackson. Deen Freelon is a Presidential Professor in the Annenberg School for Communication at the University of Pennsylvania studying social media and politics. Daughter Maya Freelon Asante is a visual artist.

== Awards and honors ==
- Eubie Blake Award, Eubie Blake National Jazz Institute
- Billie Holiday Award, Académie du Jazz

== Discography ==
Year	Title	Genre	Label	Billboard
1992	Nnenna Freelon	Jazz	Columbia	11
1993	Heritage	Jazz	Columbia	10
1994	Listen	Jazz	Columbia	20
1996	Shaking Free	Jazz	Concord	
1998	Maiden Voyage	Jazz	Concord	10
2000	Soulcall	Jazz	Concord	13
2002	Tales of Wonder	Jazz	Concord	7
2003	Church – Songs of Soul and Inspiration; Various artists – "Ooh Child" (by Nnenna Freelon)	Gospel	UTV Records	157
2003	Live (at The Kennedy Center, Washington D.C.)	Jazz	Concord	
2005	Blueprint of a Lady: Sketches of Billie Holiday	Jazz	Concord	13
2008	Better Than Anything	Jazz	Concord	
2010	Homefree	Jazz	Concord	
2012	Christmas	Jazz	Brown Boulevard	
2021	Time Traveler	Jazz	Origin Records	
2023	AnceStars with Pierce Freelon	Children's music	Blackspace Records	
2025	Beneath the Skin	Jazz	Origin Records	
2026	The Sistering with Kate McGarry, Lenora Zezalai Helm and Lois Deloatch	Jazz	Zenzalai Music	

== Grammy history ==
Nnenna Freelon Grammy Awards History
Year	Category	Title	Result
1997	Best Jazz Vocal Performance	Shaking Free	Nominated
1999	Best Jazz Vocal Performance	Maiden Voyage	Nominated
2001	Jazz Vocal Album	Soulcall	Nominated
2001	Best Instrumental Arrangement Accompanying a Vocal	Button Up Your Overcoat	Nominated
2006	Best Jazz Vocal Album	Blueprint of a Lady – Sketches of Billie Holiday	Nominated
2022	Best Jazz Vocal Album	Time Traveler	Nominated
2024	Best Children's Album	AnceStars	Nominated
