= Pierce Freelon =

American musician

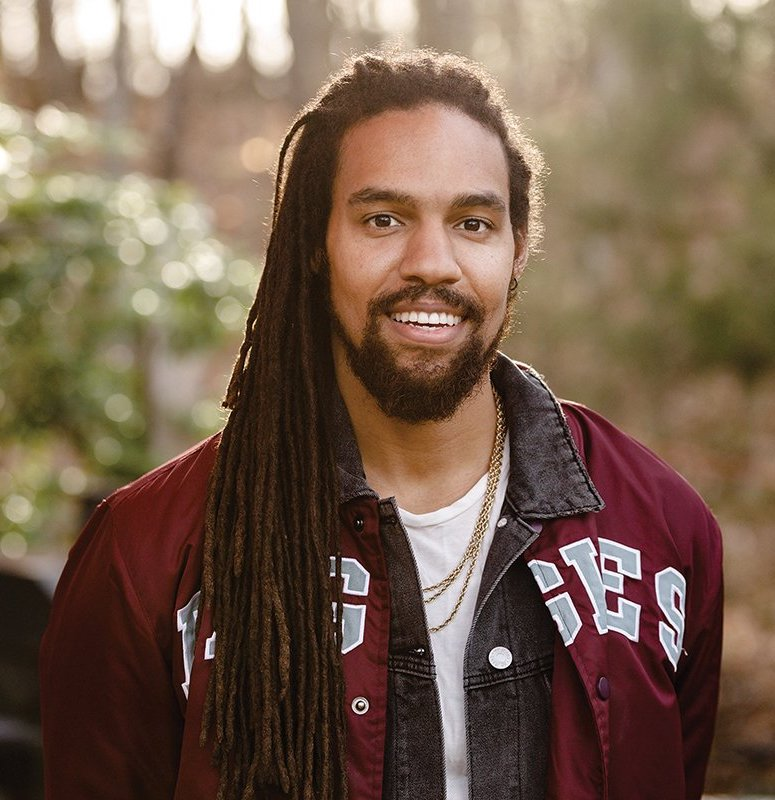
- Freelon in 2022

Durham City Council Member for Ward 3
- In office August 31, 2020 – December 6, 2021
- Preceded by: Vernetta Alston
- Succeeded by: Leonardo Williams

Personal details
- Born: Durham, North Carolina, U.S.
- Party: Democrat
- Spouse: Katye Proctor
- Parent(s): Nnenna Freelon (mother); Phil Freelon (father)
- Education: University of North Carolina at Chapel Hill; Syracuse University
- Website: piercefreelon.com

Pierce Freelon is an American musician, educator, author and politician. He is a Grammy-nominated family music artist and former Durham City Council Member. Freelon is the founder of Blackspace, an Afrofuturist digital makerspace. He is the co-founder of Beat Making Lab an Emmy Award-winning PBS web-series. He is the co-director, writer, and composer of The History of White People in America, a PBS animated series.

Freelon has taught in the departments of African, African American and Diaspora Studies and Music at UNC-Chapel Hill and in the Department of Political Science at North Carolina Central University. He is a former board member of the North Carolina Arts Council.

== Career ==
=== Music Educator ===
As an undergraduate at the University of North Carolina at Chapel Hill, Freelon created a Hip-Hop curriculum and introduced it to over 100 schools and community centers internationally. After graduating from Syracuse University, Freelon developed the Bebop to Hip Hop program for the Thelonious Monk Institute of Jazz (now the Herbie Hancock Institute of Jazz). He is co-founder of Beat Making Lab, a PBS web-series, which won Best Video Essay for its episode Heartbeats of Fiji at the 2015 Daytime Emmy Awards. His curriculums and grant-writing led to the development of Next Level - a multi-million dollar collaboration between UNC Chapel Hill and the US Department of State, teaching hip hop diplomacy and conflict resolution. Freelon has worked on music and social justice projects internationally in the Democratic Republic of Congo, Dominican Republic, Ethiopia, Fiji, Ghana, Kenya, Panama, Senegal and South Africa, with partners including the Museum of Contemporary African Diasporan Arts, (MoCADA), IntraHealth International, /The Rules, Thelonious Monk Institute of Jazz, Global Voices and the United Nations Foundation.

=== Music career ===
Pierce Freelon has performed and educated internationally with Nnenna Freelon, Herbie Hancock, Bob James, Earl Klugh and Patti Austin. He appeared on the soundtrack of The Black Candle alongside Robert Glasper, Chris Dave and Derrick Hodge. He also appeared on Nnenna Freelon's album, Home Free and has performed with hip-hop artists such as Doug E. Fresh, Grand Master Flash, The Last Poets and Dead Prez. He is the frontman of the jazz and hip hop group The Beast, which has released several albums and EPs.

Pierce Freelon released his debut Children's music album D.a.D to critical acclaim in 2020, appearing on NPR and Today Show. His sophomore family-focused album Black to the Future was featured on Billboard, MSNBC, and NPR's Morning Edition. Black to the Future was nominated for Best Children's Music Album at the 2022 Grammy Awards, the same year his mother Nnenna Freelon's album Time Traveler was nominated for Best Jazz Album — making Recording Academy history as the first mother and son to be nominated for golden gramophones in different fields at the same Grammy Awards.

=== Politics ===
Pierce Freelon ran for mayor of Durham in 2017. A first-time candidate, he earned 16% of the vote but lost the primary election. Freelon ran for North Carolina Senate District 20 in 2020 where he earned 37% of the vote but came in second in the Democratic primary.

On August 31, 2020, Freelon was appointed to serve on Durham City Council in Ward 3. In November 2021, Freelon joined Durham-native gospel legend and politician Shirley Ceaser as the second sitting Durham City Council Member to be nominated for a Grammy Award. At the end of his term, Freelon decided not to run for re-election.

== Family ==
Pierce Freelon is the son of Grammy nominee Nnenna Freelon and the late Philip Freelon, the lead architect of the Smithsonian National Museum of African American History and Culture. Freelon is married to Katye Proctor Freelon, granddaughter of the late Samuel DeWitt Proctor, the former President of A&T State University, minister of Abyssinian Baptist Church and friend/mentor to Dr. Martin Luther King, Jr.

== Discography ==
=== Albums ===
- The Beast - Belly (2008)
- The Beast - Silence Fiction (2009)
- The Beast - Freedom Suite (2010)
- The Beast - Guru Legacy (2011)
- The Beast - Gardens (2013)
- The Beast - Stories (2014)
- Pierce Freelon - Chronic The Hedgehog (2016)
- The Beast - Woke (2017)
- Pierce Freelon - D.a.D (2020)
- Pierce Freelon - Black to the Future (2021)
- Pierce Freelon & Nnenna Freelon - AnceStars (2023)

== Awards and nominations ==
Year	Category	Title	Result
2022	Best Children's Album	Black to the Future	Nominated
2024	Best Children's Album	AnceStars	Nominated
