= Justin Roberts (musician) =

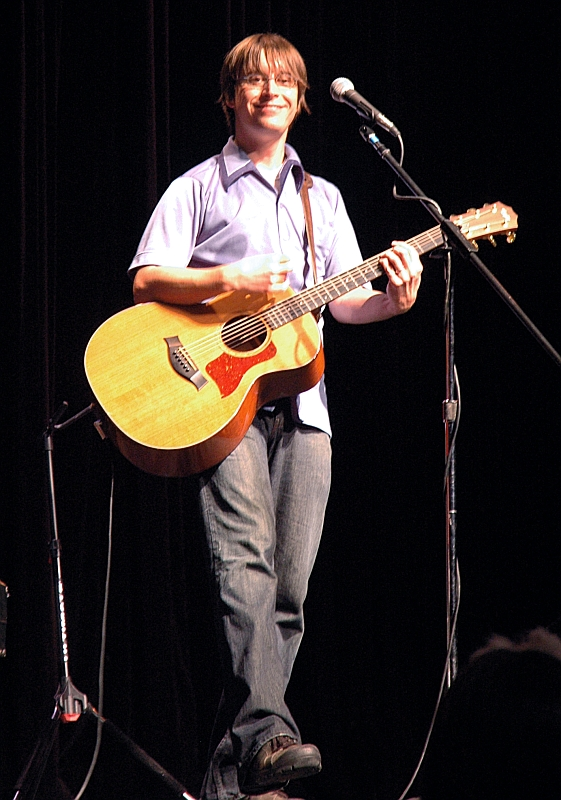
- Roberts performing in 2007

Background information
- Genres: Alternative rock; pop punk; children's music
- Instruments: Vocals; guitar; ukulele
- Years active: 1991–present
- Website: justinroberts.org

Justin Roberts (born c. 1970)is an American singer-songwriter of children's music. He performs with the Not Ready for Naptime Players. In 2010, his album Jungle Gym was nominated in the "Best Musical Album for Children" category for the 53rd Grammy Awards, Recess was nominated in the same Grammy category in 2013, for the 56th Grammy Awards, and "Lemonade" was nominated in 2017 for the 60th Grammy Awards. Justin Roberts released a Greatest Hits album in August 2016, and his new album of acoustic original songs, featuring guest Robbie Fulks, was released in October 2016.

== History ==
Roberts was born in Des Moines, Iowa. As a child, he sang in choruses and had an early love of music. Roberts attended Kenyon College at Gambier, Ohio, where he was a member of the Kokosingers, the college's male a cappella group. He formed the indie-folk band Pimentos For Gus with Mike Merz and Tracy Spuehler at Kenyon when he was a freshman in 1988. In 1992, the three members graduated from Kenyon and moved to Minneapolis, where they gained moderate popularity in the Minneapolis indie music scene of the 1990s. Roberts began a second job as a Montessori preschool teacher, and it was here where he learned his love of children's music.He wrote and performed his first children's songs for the preschool students. When Pimentos For Gus broke up in 1996, he moved to Chicago to attend graduate school, where he was a religious studies major. In December 1996, Roberts sent Liam Davis a tape of original children's songs as a Christmas present. He didn't think much of them, but Davis wanted to record them. In 1997, Roberts quit graduate school to instead focus on children's music and record his first album, Great Big Sun.

He graduated in 1992. He began his music career in the Minneapolis-based indie-rock band Pimentos for Gus, of which he was a founding member. Pimentos for Gus released three separate albums in the 1990s. Roberts decided to moonlight (during the day) as a Montessori preschool teacher. It wasn't long before Roberts began writing and singing songs for a new generation of fans: his students. The kids immediately responded and inspired Roberts to record some of his new songs and send them out to a few friends for Christmas. One of the gift recipients was Liam Davis, a college pal and music producer, who suggested that they record the songs professionally.

In 1997, Roberts released his first CD, Great Big Sun, and the critics took note. Roberts' music was soon being compared to everyone from Elvis Costello and Fountains of Wayne to Paul Simon, Electric Light Orchestra and Nick Lowe. By 2001, Roberts was playing music full-time to appreciative crowds. Word spread and shows started selling out. He has played at such renowned venues and festivals as NYC's Symphony Space, DC's National Geographic Live, Los Angeles' Getty Museum, Seattle's Moore Theatre, Lollapalooza and Chicago's Ravinia Festival.

== Discography ==
With Pimentos For Gus

- Musica Psycoustica (1993)
- The 17-Minute Workout EP (1995)
- East of Sweden (1996)

As solo artist

- Bright Becomes Blue (1999)

Children's albums

- Great Big Sun (1997)
- Yellow Bus (2001)
- Not Naptime (2003)
- Way Out (2004)
- Why Not Sea Monsters? Songs From The New Testament (2004)
- Why Not Sea Monsters? Songs From The Hebrew Scriptures (2006)
- Meltdown! (2006)
- Pop Fly (2008)
- Jungle Gym (2010)
- Lullaby (2012)
- Recess (2013)
- Greatest Hits (2016)
- Lemonade (2016)
- Wild Life (2020)
- Space Cadet (2022)
- Brain Freeze (2025)

== Awards and acknowledgements ==
Roberts is the winner of eight National Parenting Product Awards (NAPPA) and eight Parents' Choice Gold Awards.

Not Naptime was included in the Parents' Choice list of the 25 best children's CDs of the past 25 years, and Jungle Gym was MetroKids' top children's CD of 2010. Meltdown, Pop Fly and Jungle Gym were each chosen as the "Number One Children's CD of the Year" by Fids and Kamily, and Roberts' albums have been among Amazon's "Top 10 Children's CDs of the Year" four times. Meltdown was given as an example of the "Best Children's Music of the Past 30 Years" at Time Out NY Kids.

Jungle Gym was nominated for a GRAMMY Award for best album for children in 2010; Recess was nominated for a GRAMMY Award for best album for children in 2013; Lemonade was nominated for a GRAMMY Award for best album for children in 2017.

Wild Life was nominated for a GRAMMY Award for Best Children's Music Album in 2021.

== Personal life ==
Roberts is married to cellist Anna Steinhoff and has a child born in 2018. He lives in Evanston, Illinois.
