= The Okee Dokee Brothers =

American music duo

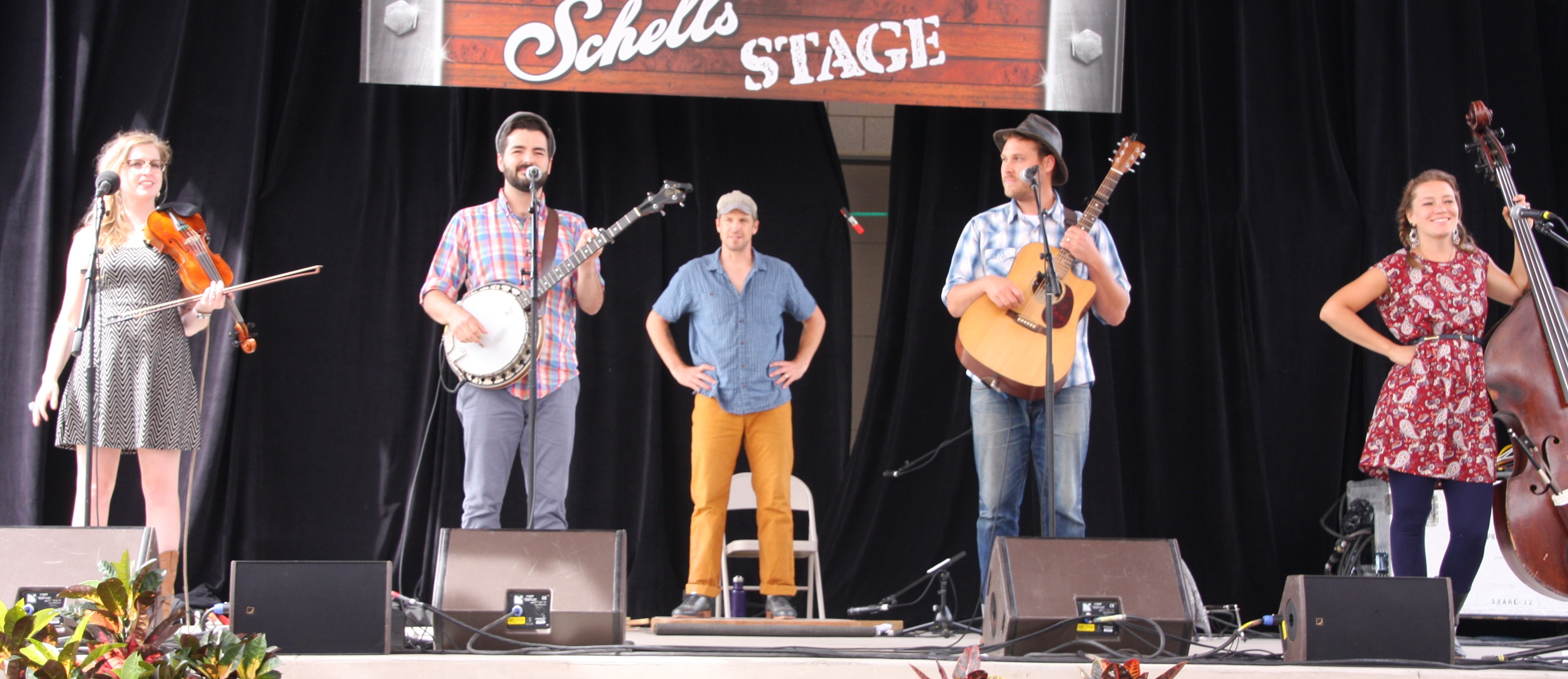
- The Okee Dokee Brothers at the 2016 Minnesota State Fair

Background information
- Born: Denver, Colorado, U.S.
- Origin: Minneapolis, Minnesota, U.S.
- Genres: Children's, independent, folk
- Instruments: Singing, acoustic guitar, banjo
- Label: Okee Dokee Music (ASCAP)
- Website: okeedokee.org

The Okee Dokee Brothers are an independent American folk and American roots children's music duo, Joe Mailander and Justin Lansing, from Minneapolis. Their 2012 CD/DVD release Can You Canoe?, with music and videos created during a 2011 paddle down the Mississippi River, won a Grammy for Best Children's Album in the 55th Grammy Awards. They released their second CD/DVD called Through the Woods in May 2014, with music and videos created during a 2013 trek up the Appalachian Trail. The album garnered a Grammy nomination in 2014. They traveled through the Southwest for another album and DVD, Saddle Up, which was also nominated for a Grammy in the best children's album category. Joe and Justin also published two picture books under Sterling Publishing (Sterling Children's) titled Can You Canoe? And Other Adventure Songs and Thousand Star Hotel. Their primary branding artist, Brandon Reese, illustrated the books.

In October 2018, The Okee Dokee Brothers released Winterland, a collection of 16 original songs exploring the wonders and beauty of winter. A voyage from autumn to spring, Winterland presents secular winter music the entire family can enjoy while cozying up around the fire. This album also received a Grammy nomination in November 2019.

In May 2020, they released, Songs for Singin, a 2-disc 27-song album full of inclusive songs so fans can join in and belt out. In the spirit of American folk legends, Woody Guthrie and Pete Seeger, Songs for Singin presents timeless messages of hope and unity. The album includes an illustrated 32-page book with the lyrics and chords to every song to inspire living room sing-alongs.

They released Brambletown in March 2023. The album is a 17-song collection that celebrates a fantastical place where “critters can talk, trees can walk and nothing’s as it seems.” Listeners are introduced to the forest's residents: Junkyard Raccoon, Doctor Mole, Fox and Hare, Possum, and Old Badger.

In July 2024, their animated 35 minute film, Brambletown, was released on PBS KIDS. Brambletown is a paper stop-motion animated musical film that explores connection and belonging – within ourselves, with each other, and with nature. The film tells the story of Fox and Badger: two lifelong friends who return to their childhood home of Brambletown, only to find that things have changed. As they grow apart, experience new hurts, and navigate a major disruption to their forest community, Fox and Badger learn that even in the darkest moments, they still have the power to heal. Brambletown's core message is that taking care of ourselves and our relationships is part of taking care of the world. Through its music and story, the film provides children and grown-ups with a safe on-ramp for talking (and singing) about some of life's toughest challenges with hope, honesty, and optimism.

In November 2025, they released the album, "Little Old You," with 14 tracks, including a rendition of the Grateful Dead's "Brokedown Palace."

The Okee Dokee Brothers only perform in America, and are yet to perform in another country.

== History ==
Justin Lansing playing banjo in 2019

Bandmates and childhood best friends, Joe Mailander and Justin Lansing, grew up in Denver and toured the midwest with their bluegrass band before settling in Minneapolis and starting their family music band, The Okee Dokee Brothers.

In 2011, Joe and Justin began a canoe trip at the headwaters of the Mississippi River, and ended at the St. Louis Gateway Arch. During their month-long journey on the Mississippi, they camped, canoed, filmed and composed the songs that make up their album Can You Canoe? This CD-DVD is the first release in their Adventure Album Series. Produced by Dean Jones in his Rosendale, NY, straw-bale studio, the record highlights guest appearances from Garth Hudson of The Band, Elizabeth Mitchell of You Are My Flower as well as Morgan Taylor and Rachel Loshak of Gustafer Yellowgold. The album received praise from NPR, won a Parents' Choice Award, and USA Today called it their "...favorite album of 2012". Can You Canoe? also won the Grammy Award for Best Children's Album of the Year in early 2013.

In 2013, The Okee Dokee Brothers embarked on their second adventure, a month-long trek on the Appalachian Trail. They hiked, camped, met mountain musicians, and wrote the songs that make up their second CD/DVD in their Adventure Album Series, entitled Through the Woods. Also produced by Dean Jones, this album emulates the instruments and styles heard in traditional old-time Appalachian music. The record features Hubby Jenkins of the Carolina Chocolate Drops, 4-time Grammy winner David Holt, and 2-time Grammy winners Cathy Fink and Marcy Marxer. Through the Woods was nominated for a Grammy Award for Best Children's Album of the Year in early 2015.

Joe Mailander in 2019

In June 2015, The Okee Dokee Brothers went out West for a month-long horsepacking trip along the Continental Divide. They rode horses, camped out, told stories, and wrote songs. Saddle Up covers tales of western wildlife, Navajo stories, Southwest-style Spanglish, the issue of guns in western lore, friendship, and more. In 2016, "Saddle Up" was nominated for a Grammy in the best children's album category.

They celebrate the spirit of the winter season on their full-length studio album, Winterland (October 2018). It's an exuberant yet introspective collection of 16 original songs exploring the wonders and beauty of winter. A voyage from autumn to spring, Winterland presents secular winter music the entire family can enjoy while cozying up around the fire. The Okee Dokee Brothers released five winter music videos to accompany the music.

Songs for Singin - 2020: Stepping away from their outdoor adventure-themed albums (Can You Canoe?, Through the Woods, Saddle Up, and Winterland), The Okee Dokee Brothers engage their fans through social conversations in the form of call and response tunes, sea shanties, church hymns, campfire songs, all-ages social songs, and protest songs. Songs for Singin' invites family members to strengthen their bonds by experiencing music together. They try to capture the free-spirit and imperfections of sing-alongs, the recordings feature an array of tunes tracked live with choruses sung by kids and parents alike.

Brambletown - 2023: The album explores themes of environmental stewardship, interconnectedness, plant and animal wisdom, and how taking care of ourselves and our relationships is part of taking care of the world. The Brothers aim to inspire a sense of gratefulness, humility, wonder, and respect for the life forces that connect all things.

The band tours nationally, performing at such venues as Austin City Limits, Lincoln Center, The Getty Museum, National Geographic Live, Orchestra Hall with the Minnesota Orchestra, Winnipeg Folk Festival, and Wolf Trap National Park for the Performing Arts, among many other performing art centers and theaters.

On August 20, 2013, Minnesota Governor Mark Dayton proclaimed "Okee Dokee Brothers Day" in the State of Minnesota.

== Discography ==
List of albums, with selected chart positions, sales and certifications
Title	Album details	Peak positions			
Title	Album details	US Folk	US Kids	US Heat.	US Ind.
Kids With Beards	Released: September 2008; Format: CD, Out of Print	—	—	—	—
Take It Outside	Released: August 2010; Format: CD, Out of Print	—	—	—	—
¡Excelente Fabuloso!	Released: October 2010; Format: CD, Out of Print	—	—	—	—
Can You Canoe?	Released: May 2012; Format: CD+DVD	—	—	— (Note: Can You Canoe? did not enter the Billboard Heatseekers Albums chart, but peaked at number 4 on the West North Central Heatseekers chart.)	—
Through The Woods	Released: May 2014; Format: CD+DVD	—	25	—	—
Saddle Up	Released: May 2016; Format: CD+DVD	17	5	18	—
Winterland	Released: October 2018; Format: CD	—	4	15	46
Songs for Singin'	Released: May 2020; Format: CD/Songbook	—	-	-	-
Brambletown	Released: March 2023; Format: CD/Vinyl	—	—	—	—
Little Old You	Released: November 2025; Format: CD/Vinyl	—	—	—	—

== Video productions ==
Each Okee Dokee Brother Adventure Album has an accompanying film that documents Joe and Justin's songwriting trip. These movies tell the story of The Okee Dokee Brothers' travels while including educational segments, camping shenanigans, music videos, interviews with locals, pristine nature scenes, and comprehensive tomfoolery. All the horseback riding, hiking, canoeing, camping, and songwriting footage is filmed on location in the setting of each adventure's theme (The Mississippi River, The Appalachian Trail, and the Great American West). The footage is filmed by Alex Johnson, and Jed Anderson (percussionist for the band) directs and edits the films (JedEditedIt Productions and InTents Studios). The films can be purchased on iTunes and Amazon, seen on the DVDs that come with their CDs, and can be found on YouTube.

The Okee Dokee Brothers released five winter music videos to accompany their album, Winterland, and continue to release music videos for songs on each of their following albums.

In July 2024, their animated 35 minute film, Brambletown, was released on PBS KIDS. Brambletown is a paper stop-motion animated musical film that explores connection and belonging – within ourselves, with each other, and with nature. The film tells the story of Fox and Badger: two lifelong friends who return to their childhood home of Brambletown, only to find that things have changed. As they grow apart, experience new hurts, and navigate a major disruption to their forest community, Fox and Badger learn that even in the darkest moments, they still have the power to heal. Brambletown's core message is that taking care of ourselves and our relationships is part of taking care of the world. Through its music and story, the film provides children and grown-ups with a safe on-ramp for talking (and singing) about some of life's toughest challenges with hope, honesty, and optimism.

== Picture books ==
Joe and Justin are working with Sterling Publishing (Sterling Children's) to publish two picture books that come with CDs of their songs.

In March 2017, they released a new picture book, Thousand Star Hotel, with Sterling Publishing. Inspired by the folktale "The Fisherman and His Wife," The Okee Dokee Brothers have "created a fanciful story about the things we wish for... and the things we really need." The accompanying CD features 11 nighttime songs and a fully dramatized audiobook of the story, read by The Okee Dokee Brothers.

Their first book, titled Can You Canoe? And Other Adventure Songs, was illustrated by Brandon Reese. The book "invites you to journey cross-country with The Okee Dokee Brothers through twelve of their irresistible, boot-stompin' tunes. You'll encounter hungry black bears and tall-tale spinners; quiet canoes and cozy camping tents; a jumpin' jamboree and a bullfrog opera. As you listen to the songs and follow along with the illustrated lyrics in this collection, you might even be inspired to head out on some outdoor adventures of your own!"

== Band members ==
- Justin Lansing – banjo and lead vocals
- Joe Mailander – acoustic guitar and lead vocals

=== Additional and touring band members ===
- Jed Anderson – percussion and backup vocals
- Liz Draper – stand-up bass
- Jillian Rae – fiddle and backup vocals
- Andy Lambert – clogger
- Carlos Medina – accordion
