= The Pop Ups =

American children's musical duo

- Born: United States
- Website: thepopups.com

The Pop Ups are a children's musical duo consisting of Jason Rabinowitz and Jacob Stein. After their national TV debut on Sprout's "Sunny Side Up Show" in April 2014, the duo released their third album, Appetite For Construction, in August 2014. The Pop-Ups perform regularly around New York City venues using cardboard props, hand-painted sets and a cast of "Original Puppets". They also have toured nationally, including a tour with Yo Gabba Gabba! Live.

== Overview ==
Jason Rabinowitz is a performer and musician and has appeared in Broadway shows "One Man, Two Guvnors" and "Encores! City Center". Jacob Stein studied art at Yale and Columbia and has taught music and education at a university level. The duo created a puppet musical for their two previous albums. The Pop Ups held their first stage show, "PASTA: A Pop Ups Puppet Musical", in New York and Los Angeles. The Pop Ups's music is recorded from Jason's home in South Brooklyn, which is also where their stage shows, videos and merchandise are made.

"Radio Jungle" (2012) features other artists, including Shawana Kemp (Shine & the Moonbeams), Peter Stampfel (The Fugs and Holy Modal Rounders) and Oran Etkin, a clarinetist-educator. In 2012, they also released "40 Things To Do In A Blackout", a post-Hurricane Sandy relief single. Appetite For Construction (2014) gained critical acclaim from the Huffington Post, Cool Mom Picks and Parents. SiriusXM program director Mindy Thomas described the sound as "sophisticated pop beats, juxtaposed with kid-centric lyrics, in a way that's simultaneously masterful and comical".

== Critical reception ==
Released in 2012, "Radio Jungle" garnered a GRAMMY nomination and accolades from Parents' Choice, the Fids and Kamily Awards (a national critics' poll) and PopDose. The first single from their most recent album, Appetite For Construction, hit number 1 on SiriusXM's Kids Place Live. The Pop Ups have won two Parents' Choice Awards, two National Parenting Publication Awards, and won the #1 Song of the Year on Kid's Corner. The duo have also been featured in Wall Street Journal and New York Times.

Appetite For Construction was featured in September 2014 on NPR's All Things Considered by children's music reviewer Stefan Shepherd, who noted that "if MTV had a kids music channel in their video heyday, this song, 'All These Shapes' would have been in constant rotation". In December 2014, the album was nominated for a Grammy Award in the Best Children's Album category.

== Discography ==
- Outside Voices – 2010
- Radio Jungle – 2012
- Appetite For Construction – 2014
- Great Pretenders Club – 2015
- Giants of Science – 2018
