= Jews and Christmas =

Interaction between Jews and a Christian holiday

Throughout the history of Christianity, Jewish peoples have been historically religious minorities in countries that were majority or even officially Christian. Over time, a unique relationship evolved between the Jews and the major Christian holiday of Christmas, including the creation of separate traditions and the intersection of Hanukkah and Christmas, among other convergences. Some practices perpetuate out of a feeling of otherness, while others are merely lighthearted activities that are accessible when shops are closed around Christmas time.

== Background ==
Judaism and Christianity have historically interacted and intersected while remaining both theologically and emotionally distinct. Many Jews have historically been the religious minority in majority-Christian countries, and have experienced antisemitism based in Christian beliefs. Historically, some Jewish groups have developed sentiments, traditions, and works of art and literature in opposition to Christianity; however, unlike Christian antisemitism, this Jewish anti-Christianity has generally been subtle and intended for the purpose of preserving the Jewish culture and way of life in the face of pressure to assimilate into the Christian religion.

One example of this phenomenon is Toledot Yeshu (Hebrew: ספר תולדות ישו, romanized: Sefer Toledot Yeshu, lit. 'The Book of the Generations/History/Life of Jesus'), a popular text among medieval and early modern Jews which attacks the Christian mythology of Christ through parody. While it was not accepted within mainstream Rabbinic Judaism, the text was considered an important historical source by Jewish scribes and scholars.

According to Marc B. Shapiro, the word Christmas does not appear in rabbinic literature, in adherence to the Halakhic prohibition of mentioning the name of an idolatrous holiday if that name represents the idol in question as divine or sovereign. In medieval Jewish texts, the holiday is referred to as Nittel, derived from the Medieval Latin Natale Dominus which is also the etymological source of the French name for Christmas Noël.

== Jewish activities on Christmas ==
=== Nittel Nacht ===
Nittel Nacht is a term used in historical Jewish literature for Christmas Eve. On this night, segments of the Ashkenazi Jewish community and specifically Hasidic Jews historically abstained from the study of Torah. This practice, which began in the early modern period, was accompanied by various other traditions on the same night including sexual abstinence, consumption of garlic, and social gatherings. However, the practice was not accepted by the yeshivas of Lithuania, which maintained that Torah study should continue on Christmas Eve.

=== In the United States ===
==== Chinese food ====
A widespread Christmas tradition among Jewish Americans consists of eating Chinese cuisine. The practice began as far back as the 19th century; the proximity of Jewish and Chinese American communities in Manhattan's Lower East Side helped start the tradition. The earliest documented instance of Jewish people dining in Chinese restaurants dates to 1899, when the American Jewish Journal criticized Jews for eating in Chinese restaurants in violation of rabbinical kosher regulations.

Today, the tradition has spread from New York to Jewish people across America. One Chinatown restaurant in Chicago reported in 2004 that their number of reservations more than tripled from thirty on a normal night to nearly a hundred on Christmas—half of them Jewish. Another quipped that the year before, "I think we had the entire Jewish community here", with their 350-seat restaurant being completely booked on December 25.

The tradition has been the subject of many comedic routines, including "Borscht Belt" comedians such as Jackie Mason and Buddy Hackett. During Supreme Court confirmation hearings for Elena Kagan, South Carolina Senator Lindsey Graham asked the judge during a rather tense exchange where she was on Christmas Day. Kagan replied, "You know, like all Jews, I was probably at a Chinese restaurant," causing the room to break into laughter. The Atlantic credited the televised exchange as the moment where the tradition transformed "from kitsch into codified custom".

Many reasons for the tradition have been offered, including the fact that Chinese restaurants generally remain open on Christmas Day and that Chinese food rarely mixes meat and dairy, the latter of which is prohibited under kosher law. More broadly, the tradition symbolizes to many Jewish people a rejection of historical Christmas observances and a feeling of commonality with other minority cultures who do not participate in those observances, and this tradition unites them in their "otherness" concerning the holiday.

==== Matzo Ball ====
The Matzo Ball is an annual party held on Christmas Eve in many major cities throughout the United States and Canada, directed toward Jewish singles in their 20s and 30s. The event was created to give Jews something to do on a night when they might otherwise be lonely or not have anything to do. Attendees may go to enjoy the dancing, find a short- or long-term partner, meet new people, hang out with friends, or because they would otherwise be lonely on Christmas Eve. There are several similar competing events, such as "The Ball" and "Schmooz-a-Palooza."

== Jewish celebration of Christmas ==
=== Chrismukkah ===
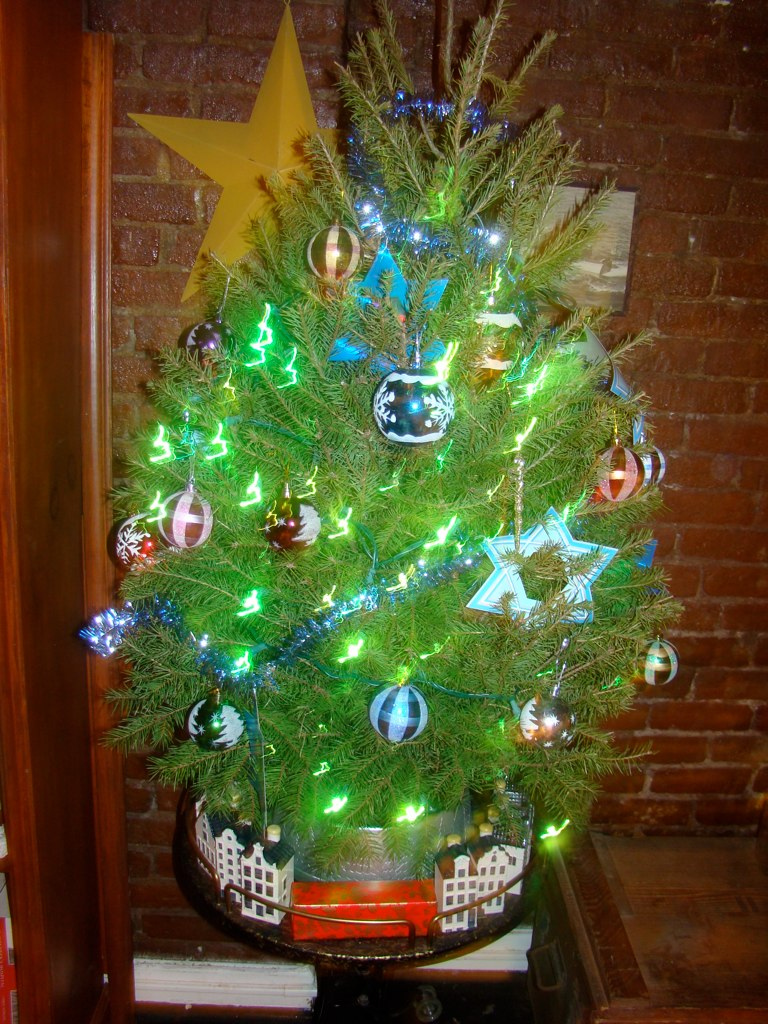
A Hanukkah bush

The term Chrismukkah, a portmanteau of Christmas and Hanukkah, was coined in a December 2003 episode of The O.C. to refer to a combination of Christmas and Hanukkah. The term became popular, and Warner Bros. began selling related merchandise, but Catholic League and the New York Board of Rabbis released a joint statement condemning the idea as a "multicultural mess" which they stated was insulting to both Christians and Jews.

A similar term in German, Weihnukka, is a portmanteau of Weihnachten and Chanukka. In French, Hannoël combines Hanoucca with Noël.

==== Traditions and items ====
Blending between the Christmas and Hanukkah traditions has resulted in various traditions and items specific to Chrismukkah or to the interaction between Hanukkah and Christmas. Christmas trees are sometimes decorated with symbols representing Judaism or Hanukkah; such a tree may be dubbed a "Chrismukkah tree" or "Hanukkah bush".

=== Christmas songs written by Jews ===
Many popular Christmas songs, especially in the United States, were written by Jewish composers, including "White Christmas", "The Christmas Song", "Let It Snow", "It's the Most Wonderful Time of the Year", and "Rudolph the Red-Nosed Reindeer". These songs focus on the secular aspects of Christmas rather than the religious aspects, portraying Christmas as an American holiday. One writer observed that "the entire sound track of this holiday, with remarkably few exceptions" was written by Jews.

== Relationship between Hanukkah and Christmas ==
=== Historical relationship ===
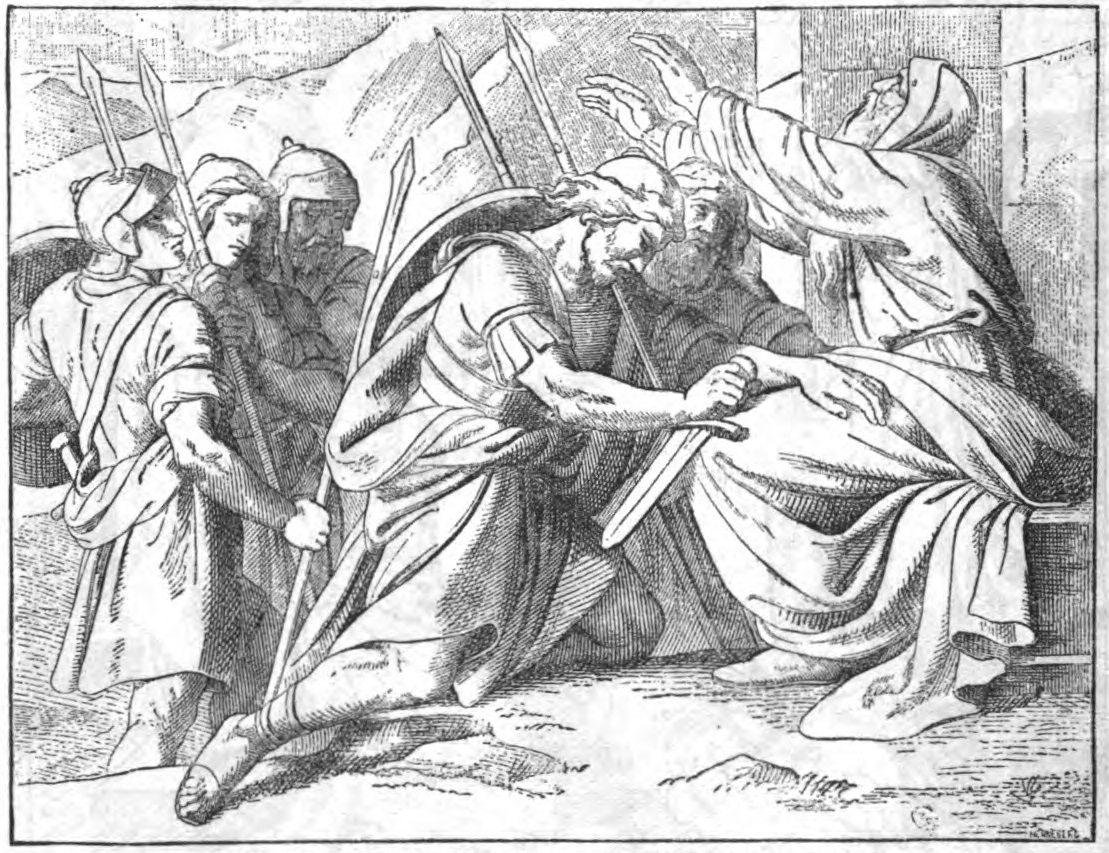
Artist's depiction of the Maccabees

During the American Civil War, the men of Keyam Dishmaya viewed the Maccabees of the Hanukkah story as a model for resistance to Jewish assimilation and increasing description of Christmas as "universal" across the United States. In the late 19th and early 20th centuries, Christmas decorations and gift exchanges became increasingly popular in the United States, and rabbis were frustrated by many American Jews' incorporation of the same practices into their celebration of Hanukkah. German Christmas traditions were adopted by many German Jews in the 19th century; a number of whom emigrated to Cincinnati, where the developing Jewish press expressed concern about this Jewish adoption of Christian customs. Rabbis Isaac Mayer Wise and Max Lilienthal responded by creating Hanukkah celebrations designed to appeal to Jewish children, incorporating singing, speeches, and other celebratory activities. Solomon H. Sonneschein, another rabbi, proposed that celebration of Hanukkah be moved to December 25 to coincide with Christmas.

Hanukkah was adopted by the Zionist movement because of its depiction of Jewish strength, masculinity, and political victory. In 1896, when Rabbi Moritz Güdemann visited Theodor Herzl and his family in Austria and saw that they were celebrating Christmas, Güdemann convinced Herzl to remove the Christmas tree and celebrate Hanukkah instead. Herzl went on to write "The Menorah", an essay which argued that Jewish rejection of Christmas and celebration of Hanukkah was a core component of Jewish self-respect.

In the early 20th century, the holiday provided an opportunity for American Jews and especially American Jewish women to "resolve the ambiguity of being an American Jew" and engage in Jewish practice during a season dominated by Christianity.

=== Modern relationship ===
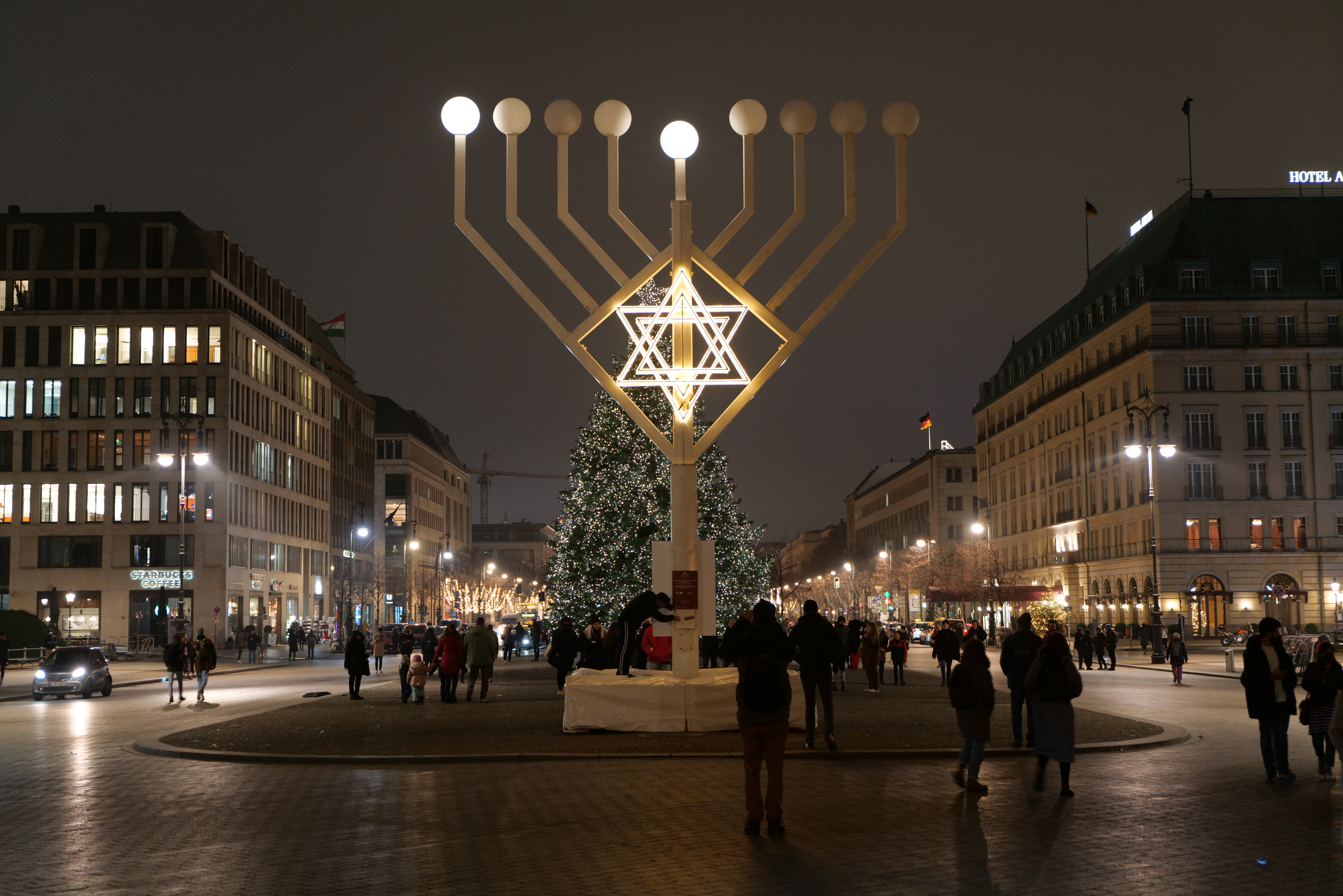
A large public menorah, with a Christmas tree visible in the background, at Pariser Platz on December 11, 2020

The Jewish holiday of Hanukkah, traditionally a minor one, is considered important in the modern United States because it occurs during the Christmas and holiday season; many American Jews view it as a Jewish counterpart to Christmas. Data suggests that Hanukkah's close temporal proximity to Christmas is what drives its modern popularity in the United States, and that American Jews may use Hanukkah to provide an alternative to Christmas for their children. Some Jews and rabbis have objected to the increasing importance of the minor holiday, with the Women's League for Conservative Judaism arguing in 1990 that "any child who has built a sukkah will not feel deprived of trimming a [Christmas] tree" and that increased emphasis on Hanukkah was therefore not necessary.

== Polling ==
=== United Kingdom ===
The 2022 National Jewish Identity Survey, conducted by the Institute for Jewish Policy Research, found that 28% of British Jews had a Christmas tree at home, with younger Jews more likely to have them than older Jews. 58% of non-practising Jews reported having a Christmas tree while just 1% of Orthodox Jews did.

== See also ==
- Christianity and Judaism
- Christmas and holiday season
- Christmas controversies
- Christmas in Israel
- Jews and Halloween
- Jews and Thanksgiving
- The Chanukah Song
- The Latke Who Couldn't Stop Screaming: A Christmas Story
