= Ops Selamat =

Ops Selamat (Operation Safe) (formerly Ops Sikap (Operation Attitude) and Ops Statik) is a traffic safety operation carried out by the Royal Malaysian Police to ensure safety on all roads in Malaysia during festive seasons such as Hari Raya Aidilfitri, Deepavali, Christmas Day and Chinese New Year. This operation began in 2001 and also involves the collaboration of the Malaysian Fire and Rescue Department, Malaysian Civil Defence Department, St. John Ambulance of Malaysia, Ministry of Health (Malaysia), Malaysian Road Transport Department (JPJ), Land Public Transport Commission (SPAD) and the National Anti-Drugs Agency (NADA).

== List of operations ==
=== Ops Sikap (2001–2011) ===
Year	Operation	Date in operation	Duration (days)	Festive season
2001	Ops Sikap I	9–23 December	14	Christmas Day
2002	Ops Sikap II	5–19 February	14	Chinese New Year
2002	Ops Sikap III	29 November – 13 December	13	Hari Raya Aidilfitri
2003	Ops Sikap IV	25 January – 8 February	14	Chinese New Year
2003	Ops Sikap V	18 November – 2 December	14	Hari Raya Aidilfitri
2004	Ops Sikap VI	15–29 January	14	Chinese New Year
2004	Ops Sikap VII	7–21 November	14	Hari Raya Aidilfitri and Deepavali (Deeparaya)
2005	Ops Sikap VIII	2–16 February	13	Chinese New Year
2005	Ops Sikap IX	27 October – 10 November	14	Hari Raya Aidilfitri and Deepavali (Deeparaya)
2006	Ops Sikap X	23 January – 6 February	14	Chinese New Year
2006	Ops Sikap XI	17–31 October	14	Hari Raya Aidilfitri and Deepavali (Deeparaya)
2007	Ops Sikap XII	11–25 February	14	Chinese New Year
2007	Ops Sikap XIII	7–21 October	14	Hari Raya Aidilfitri
2007	Ops Sikap XIV	6–11 November	4	Deepavali
2007- 2008	Ops Sikap XV	19 December – 2 January	14	Christmas Day and New Year's Day
2008	Ops Sikap XVI	31 January – 14 February	14	Chinese New Year
2008	Ops Sikap XVII	24 September – 8 October	14	Hari Raya Aidilfitri
2008	Ops Sikap XVIII (Special)	24–29 October	5	Deepavali
2009	Ops Sikap XIX	19 January – 2 February	14	Chinese New Year
2009	Ops Sikap XX	24–29 October	5	Hari Raya Puasa
2010	Ops Sikap XXI	7–21 February	14	Chinese New Year
2010	Ops Sikap XXII	1–16 September	22	Hari Raya Aidilfitri and Malaysia Day (Merdeka Raya)
2011	Ops Sikap XXIII			Chinese New Year
2011	Ops Sikap XXIV			Hari Raya Aidilfitri and Merdeka Day (Merdeka Raya)
2012	Ops Sikap XXV			Chinese New Year

=== Ops Selamat (2012–present) ===
Year	Operation	Date in operation	Duration (days)	Festive season
2012	Ops Selamat I			Hari Raya Aidilfitri and Merdeka Day (Merdeka Raya)
2013	Ops Selamat II			Chinese New Year
2013	Ops Selamat III			Hari Raya Aidilfitri and Merdeka Day (Merdeka Raya)
2014	Ops Selamat IV	23 January – 7 February		Chinese New Year
2015	Ops Selamat V	23 July – 3 August		Hari Raya Aidilfitri
2015	Ops Selamat VI	17 Feb – 1 March	15 days	Chinese New Year
2015	Ops Selamat VII	10–24 July	15 Days	Hari Raya Aidilfitri
2016	Ops Selamat VIII	1 Feb – 15 February	15 days	Chinese New Year
2016	Ops Selamat X	27 June – 11 July	15 Days	Hari Raya Aidilfitri
