= Thanksgivukkah =

Portmanteau neologism of Thanksgiving and Hanukkah convergence

Thanksgivukkah is a holiday name portmanteau neologism given to the convergence of the American holiday of Thanksgiving and the first day (and second night) of the Jewish holiday of Hanukkah on Thursday, November 28, 2013. It was the result of a rare coincidence between the lunisolar Hebrew calendar (whose dates reflect both the moon phase and the time of the solar year, and which can have between 353 and 385 days per year) and the Gregorian calendar. Because the calendars are not calculated the same way, Hanukkah appears from year to year on different dates on the Gregorian calendar, ranging from late November to early January.

The term "Thanksgivukkah" was trademarked by Dana Gitell, a Boston-area resident who, along with her sister-in-law, Deborah Gitell, created a Facebook page and a Twitter account devoted to the phenomenon and bought the URL. Boston Magazine reported that the idea was popular all over the U.S.

There has been some disagreement about the name: the Manischewitz company, the country’s top producer of kosher food, has spelled the dual-holiday with one fewer "k" towards the end, as “Thanksgivukah”; and Israeli newspaper Haaretz posed the question: "Why 'Thanksgivukkah'? Why not 'Chanksgiving?'". Haaretz points to a clip from The O.C., the source of the portmanteau "Chrismukkah", as the basis of the "Thanksgivukkah" portmanteau.

== History ==
Thanksgiving Day fell during Hanukkah at least twice between 1863 (when Thanksgiving was proclaimed a U.S. federal holiday by President Abraham Lincoln) and 2013: in 1888 Thanksgiving was the first day of Hanukkah, and in 1899 it was the fourth day. The 1888 coincidence of Thanksgiving and Hanukkah attracted some media attention at the time, with the New York Herald reporting on joint Thanksgiving–Hanukkah services held in "various synagogues" and a sermon given by Rabbi Frederick de Sola Mendes.

Thanksgiving occurred later in 1888 and 1899 than is possible under current U.S. law: as a result of changes between 1939 and 1941, Thanksgiving is always held on the fourth Thursday in November. The last time the fourth Thursday of November fell within Hanukkah before 2013 was in 1861, before Thanksgiving existed. As a result of this confusion, some media reports have mistakenly claimed that Thanksgivukkah had never occurred prior to 2013.

Because the Gregorian and Jewish calendars have slightly different average year lengths, over time they drift out of sync with each other. As a result of this, the first day of Hanukkah will not precede or coincide with Thanksgiving Day again in the foreseeable future. (One physicist has calculated that, if the Jewish calendar is not revised, Thursday, November 28 will not fall during Hanukkah again until the year 79811, once it has drifted all the way around the cycle of the Gregorian calendar and back to November. Many media sources have reported this "tongue-in-cheek" calculation as a serious estimate of the date of the next Thanksgivukkah.) However, since the Jewish day does not begin at midnight, but on the sunset before it, there will be two more years in which Hanukkah and Thanksgiving partially overlap, with the first night of Hanukkah beginning in the evening of Thanksgiving. These will be the evenings of Thursday, November 27, 2070 and Thursday, November 28, 2165. (The most recent such year was 1918.)

== Celebrations ==
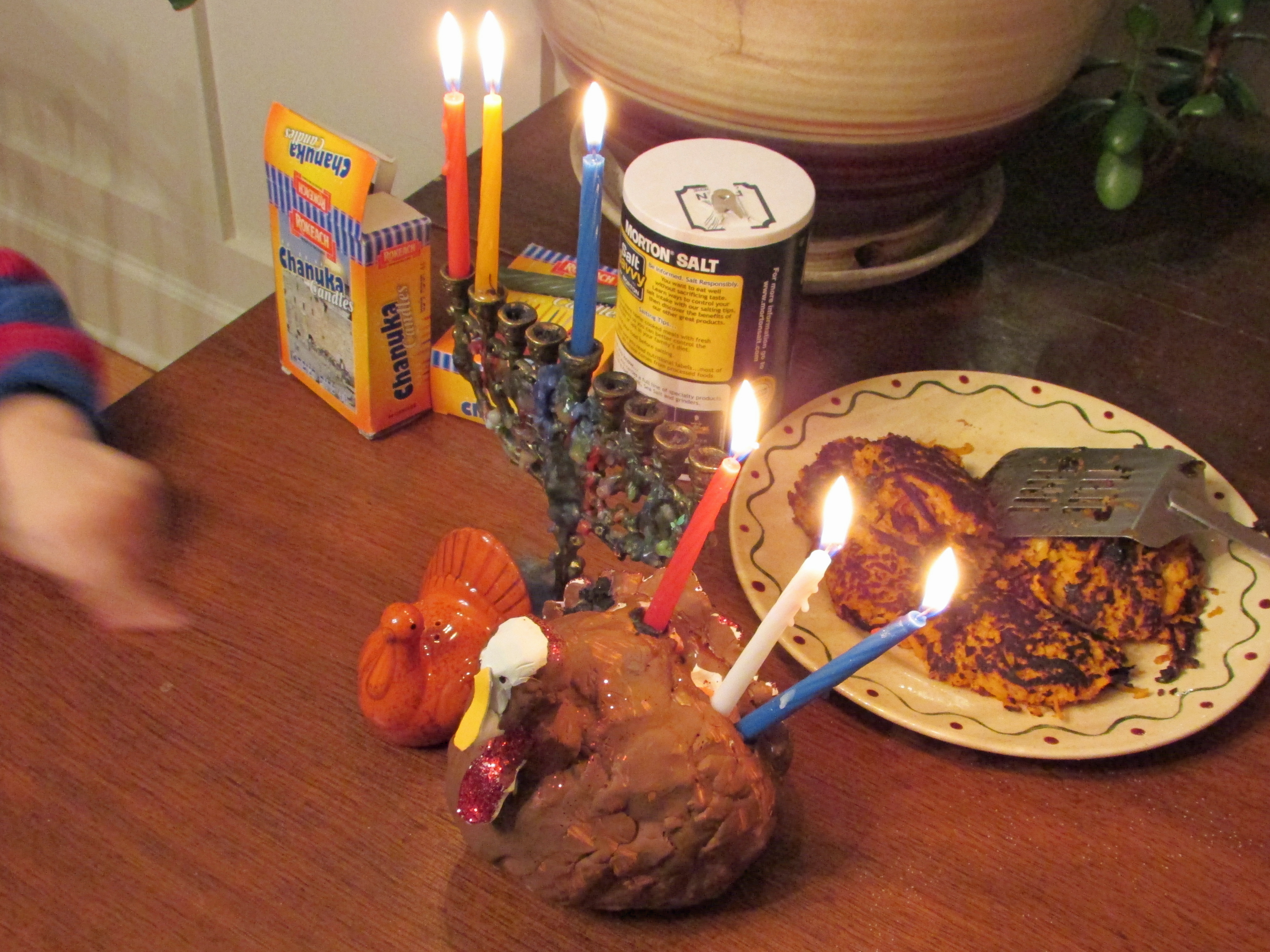
Menurkey and sweet potato latkes for Thanksgivukkah

Mayor Thomas Menino of Boston said he would proclaim November 28, 2013, “Thanksgivukkah,” saying through a spokeswoman: "This is a big deal, a once-in-a-lifetime event.” Massachusetts State Representative Louis Kafka and local rabbi David Paskin planned to host a gathering close to Thanksgivukkah, that will include a turkey-shaped menorah to give to fellow representatives to put in the Massachusetts State House. U.S. President Barack Obama gave a speech likening the struggles of the Maccabees to those of the Pilgrims.

Macy's included a giant dreidel in its Thanksgiving Day Parade in New York City. The Dirty Sock Funtime Band wrote a song, "Hannukah, O Hannukah (Introducing the Menurkey!)", and included it in a show in New York City. A rabbi in Mineola, Long Island, granted a pardon to a kosher turkey in honor of Thanksgivukkah.

A Los Angeles-based festival co-produced by Deborah Gitell and singer/songwriter Craig Taubman was held on November 29, 2013, at the Pico Union building, featuring the Moshav Band and hip hop rapper Kosha Dillz. The festival was funded by a campaign on crowdfunding platform Jewcer. The Beth Tfiloh Congregation in Pikesville, Maryland, set off fireworks to celebrate Thanksgivukkah.

President Obama recognized Thanksgivukkah at the official White House Hanukkah reception on December 5, singling out Menurkey-creator Asher Weintraub as well as Dana and Deborah Gitell for coining the phrase "Thanksgivukkah".

Outside the United States, in London, England, the Saatchi Shul hosted a Thanksgivukka Friday night dinner. In Tel Aviv, Israel, Nefesh B'Nefesh co-hosted a Thanksgivukka Friday night dinner and clothing drive.

There have been parodies of it, by satirist Stephen Colbert and by satire news program Dish Nation. Comedian Yisrael Campbell starred in a fake movie trailer for a horror movie titled Happy Thanksgivukkah, where a gentile family's thanksgiving dinner is invaded by a large Jewish family celebrating Hannukah.

There has been opposition to the holiday on the ground that the syncretism trivializes both festivals. An Anti-Thanksgivukkah anthem was featured in Heeb Magazine and subsequently in The Jewish Daily Forward.

Jewish a cappella singing group Six13 released a music video on November 25, 2013, entitled "The Thanksgivukkah Anthem," which recounts both holidays' history and celebrates the fact that they were occurring on the same day.

== Food ==
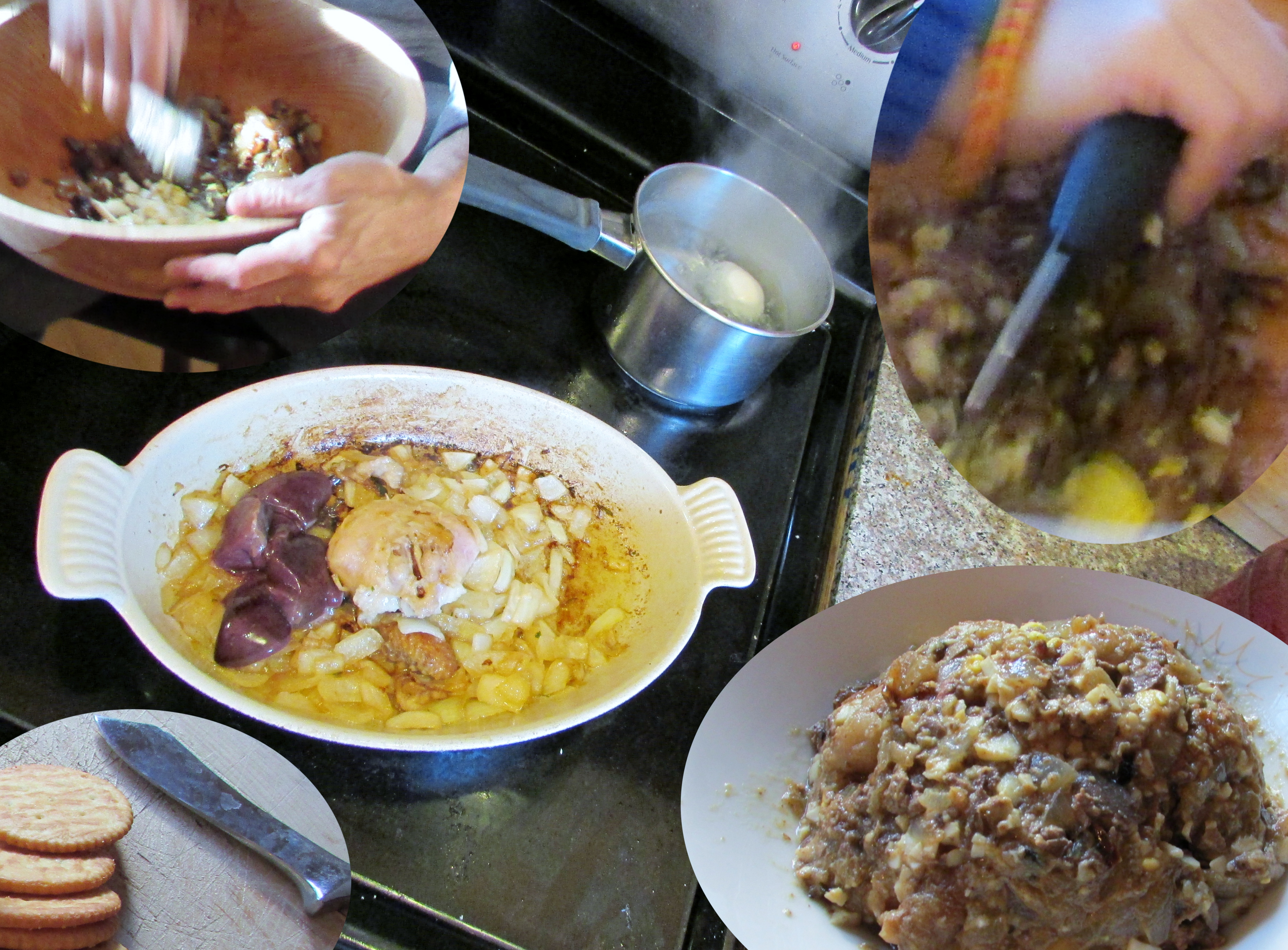
Chopped liver made by sautéing turkey liver and onions in turkey schmaltz, then chopping in a wooden bowl with hard-boiled egg, served with crackers

Numerous suggestions were publicly made for combinations of traditional dishes of both holidays. BuzzFeed posted "How to Celebrate Thanksgivukkah, the Best Holiday of All Time," with recipes for Manischewitz-brined turkey with challah apple stuffing and latkes with cranberry applesauce. Others focused on sweet potato latkes, latke-crusted turkey cutlets, stuffing a turkey with challah bread, pecan pie rugelach, turkey doughnuts, pumpkin kugel, sufganiyot filled or topped with a sweet cranberry or apple compote or canned pumpkin, and sweet potato, prune and carrot tzimmes.

Lower Manhattan restaurant Kutsher’s Tribeca announced that it would serve a three-course Thanksgivukkah dinner, including sweet potato latkes topped with melted marshmallows. The Manischewitz company launched a multimillion-dollar multimedia campaign in support of the holiday.

Chicago chef and 2013 Kosherfest honoree Laura Frankel, Executive Chef at Spertus Institute for Jewish Learning and Leadership, curated a menu of Thanksgivukkah dishes that included culinary hybrids like pumpkin-spice latkes and turkey schnitzel with thyme and orange zest.

== Products and shopping ==
Thanksgivukkah was characterized by products promoted on and sold online. Funds of over $48,000 to produce a turkey-shaped menorah, dubbed a "menurkey," were raised by nine-year-old Asher Weintraub in Manhattan, New York, via a Kickstarter campaign. A crafter in Seattle, Washington, created another Thanksgiving-inspired menorah after she saw a camel menorah and decided she needed a "Turkorah". Some suggested that the holiday shopping season would be impacted by the convergence, and that retailers might have earlier holiday promotions. A Thanksgivukkah pop-up store opened in Atlanta, and the Manischewitz company produced a line of products for this day.

== Similarities between Thanksgiving and Hanukkah ==
While the imagery and products surrounding the day were light-hearted, advocates contended it had a broader significance resonant with American democracy. “There are amazing similarities between the Pilgrims’ quest for religious freedom and what the Maccabees were fighting for,” one advocate told the New York Daily News, referring to the Hanukkah story of Judah Maccabee, who led the Hebrews’ fight for freedom from and military victory over the Greeks in the 2nd century BC. “This a great opportunity for Jewish Americans to celebrate this country and for everyone to acknowledge the greatness of our shared religious freedoms.” In 1888, the New York Herald wrote that "The two festivals merged well together," describing Hanukkah as "a thanksgiving festival for deliverance from… tyranny". A "Thanksgivukkah Manifesto" has been penned by Mishael Zion, claiming that it is the ideal holiday for increasingly secular American Jews.

Additionally, some have claimed that both Hanukkah and Thanksgiving have roots in the Jewish harvest festival of Sukkot.

== Similar holidays ==
Chrismukkah is a portmanteau neologism referring to the merging of the holidays of Christianity's Christmas and Judaism's Hanukkah. The term was popularized by the TV drama The O.C. Chrismukkah is also celebrated as an ironic, alternative holiday. Similar neologisms such as Chrismahanukwanzakah and HanuKwanzMas blend Christmas, Hanukkah, and Kwanzaa.

In A Kosher Christmas: 'Tis the Season to Be Jewish (Rutgers University Press, 2012), author Rabbi Joshua Eli Plaut discusses the phenomenon of hybrid Jewish holidays such as Chrismukkah during the December holiday season in the US, and the Americanization of Hanukkah and the holiday season for Jews.

== See also ==
- Deeparaya, a name for the combined Deepavali and Hari Raya festivals which are traditionally celebrated by Hindus and Muslims respectively in Malaysia and Singapore
- Kongsi Raya, a Malaysian portmanteau denoting the Chinese New Year and Hari Raya festivals
- Jews and Thanksgiving
