= Victor Vito =

Victor Vito may refer to:

- Victor Vito (album), a 1999 album by Laurie Berkner
- Victor Vito (rugby union) (born 1987), New Zealand rugby player
