= Christmas in Israel =

Unofficial holiday

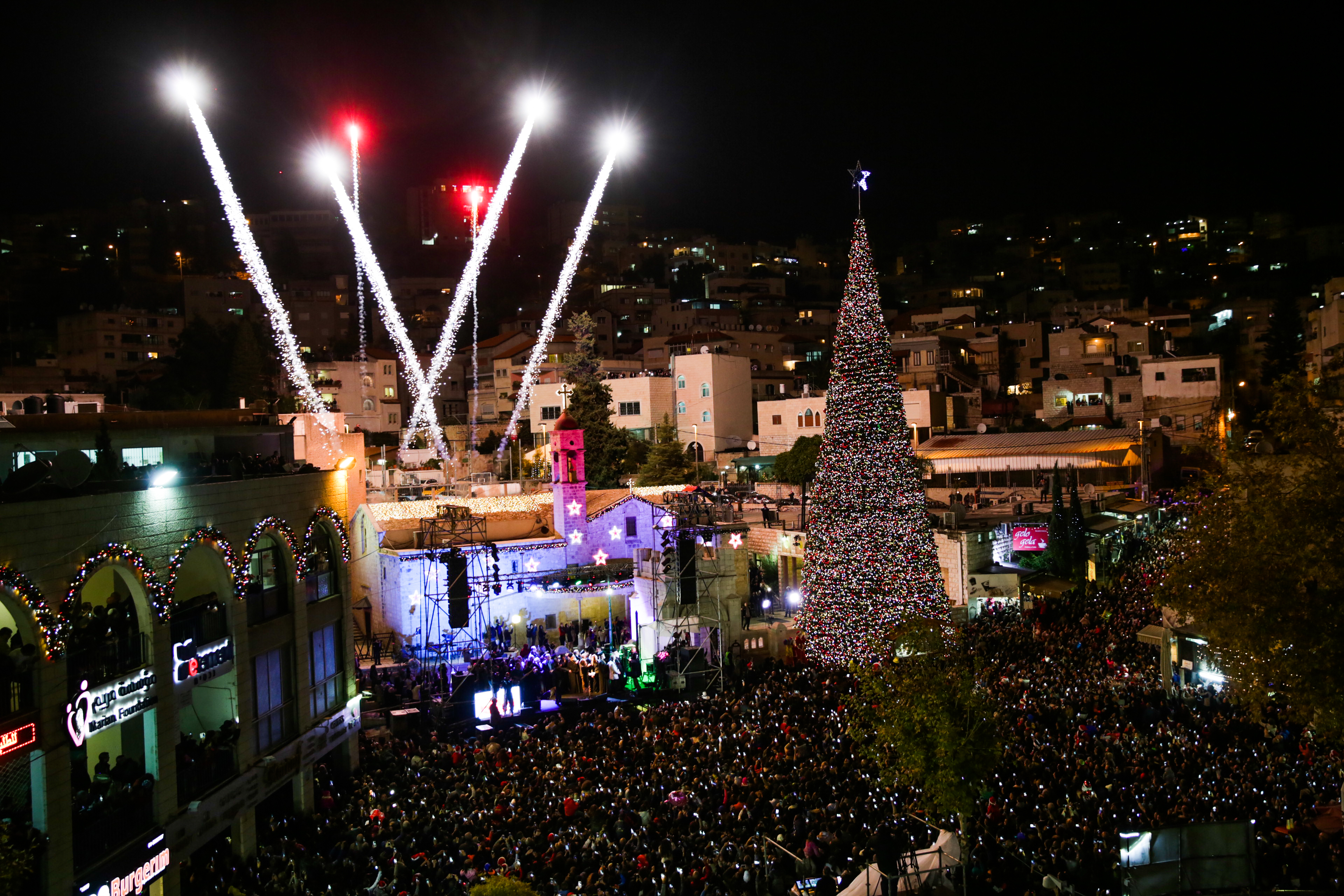
Illumination of a Christmas tree in the city of Nazareth

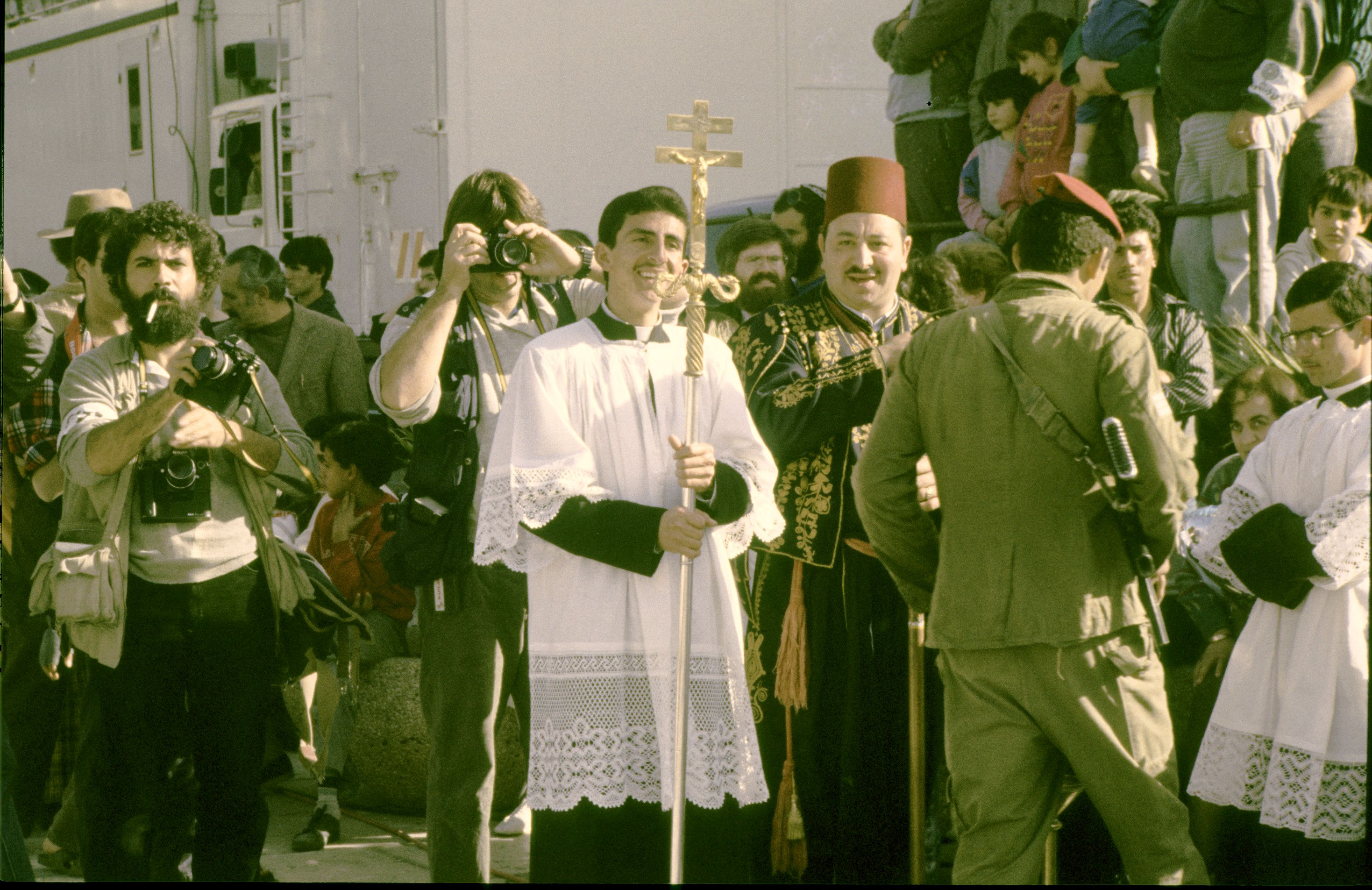
Christmas celebrations in Nazareth, 1986.

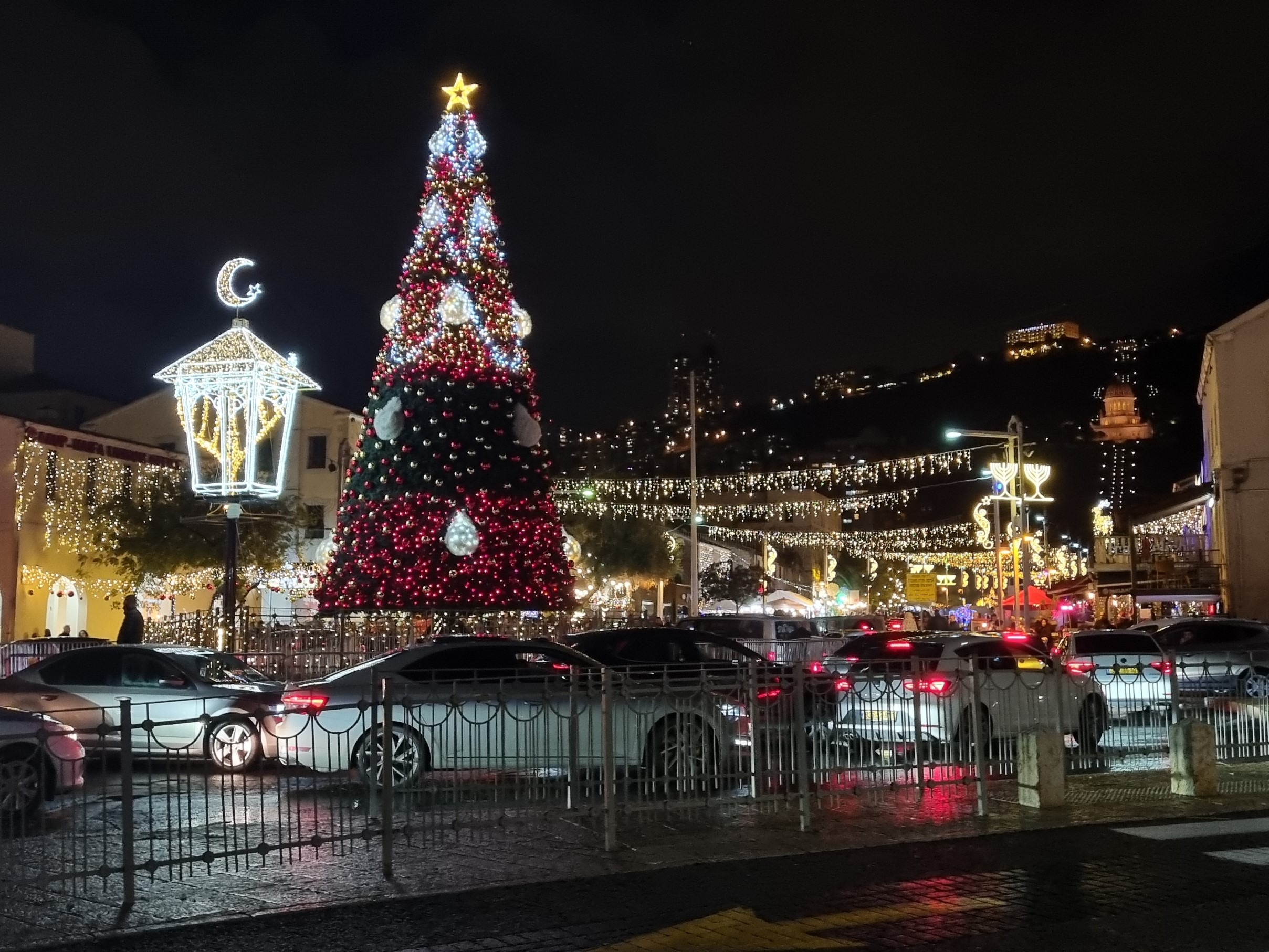
Christmas tree at the holiday celebrations in Haifa, 2021

Christmas celebrations in Israel are few compared to other places in the world. Since only 2.5% of the country's population are Christians and Christmas is not one of Israel's holidays, Christmas is not a common holiday in Israel, this is due to the fact that the country was set up around Judaism, not Christianity. However, the Christmas story took place according to tradition in the Holy Land, in the territories of the State of Israel and in the areas under its control. Among the places associated with Christmas are some of the holiest sites for Christianity, such as the city of Nazareth. These sites are also an attraction for pilgrimage to Holy Land. Special Christmas ceremonies are held throughout Israel in Christian churches alongside Christmas concerts, markets, bazaars, processions, sermons and events.

Christmas symbols are visible in areas with Christian populations such as Jaffa, Haifa, Nazareth, and the Old City of Jerusalem. Even in neighborhoods where communities of Jews from the former Soviet Union, many of whom celebrate Christmas, there is a greater presence of the holiday's symbols. The Nazareth Municipality illuminates Christmas lights and outdoor markets that celebrate Christmas, and the Haifa Municipality promotes a series of outdoor events called "The Holiday of the Holidays" that appeal to believers of the three monotheistic religions. Beyond that, Christmas symbols are not common throughout Israel. Christmas celebrations are also less commercialized than in much of the Western world, because Judaism and Islam are the two main religions of Israel.

During the British Mandate, the holiday was widely celebrated and the Mandatory government offices were closed. Also, towards the end of the mandate, the British High Commissioner sent a letter in honor of the holiday, and the ceremonies were broadcast on radio and screened. With the establishment of the state of Israel, these ceremonies continued to be broadcast on Israeli radio.

== See also ==
- Jews and Christmas
- Chrismukkah
- Novy God
