= Under a Shady Tree =

Studio album by Laurie Berkner
- Released: November 15, 2002
- Genre: Children
- Length: 51:54
- Labels: Two Tomatoes Records; Capitol Records; Universal Records
- Producer: Laurie Berkner

Laurie Berkner chronology
| Victor Vito (1999) | Under a Shady Tree (2002) | We Are...The Laurie Berkner Band (2006) |

Under a Shady Tree is the Two Tomatoes Records and Capitol Records album by children's musician Laurie Berkner. It was released in November 2002, and distributed by Universal Records. The album received a Parents' Choice Award, and was described as having "cheerful charm".

== Track listing ==
1. "Under a Shady Tree" (2:50)
2. "Rhubarb Pie (Hot Commodity") (2:36)
3. "Mr." (2:14)
4. "Drive My Car" (1:45)
5. "I'm Gonna Catch You" (3:23)
6. "Just Like the Sun" (2:12)
7. "Mahalo" (2:27)
8. "I'm Me and You're You" (1:38)
9. "Choc-o-Lot in My Pock-o-Lot" (2:26)
10. "Shortnin' Bread" (1:49)
11. "Running Down the Hill" (3:14)
12. "My Energy" (1:54)
13. "After It Rains" (1:39)
14. "Do the Dragon" (5:12)
15. "Song in My Tummy" (2:51)
16. "This Hat" (2:20)
17. "Who's That?" (1:35)
18. "Smile" (3:00)
19. "Boody Boody Ya Ya Ya" (3:30)
20. "Blow a Kiss" (2:47)
21. [Hidden Track] (:10)

== Production ==
- Recorded at Hoboken Curve Studio, Hoboken, New Jersey
- Mastered by Scott Anthony at The Viewing Room
