= Anne Harris (musician) =

American singer (born 1966)

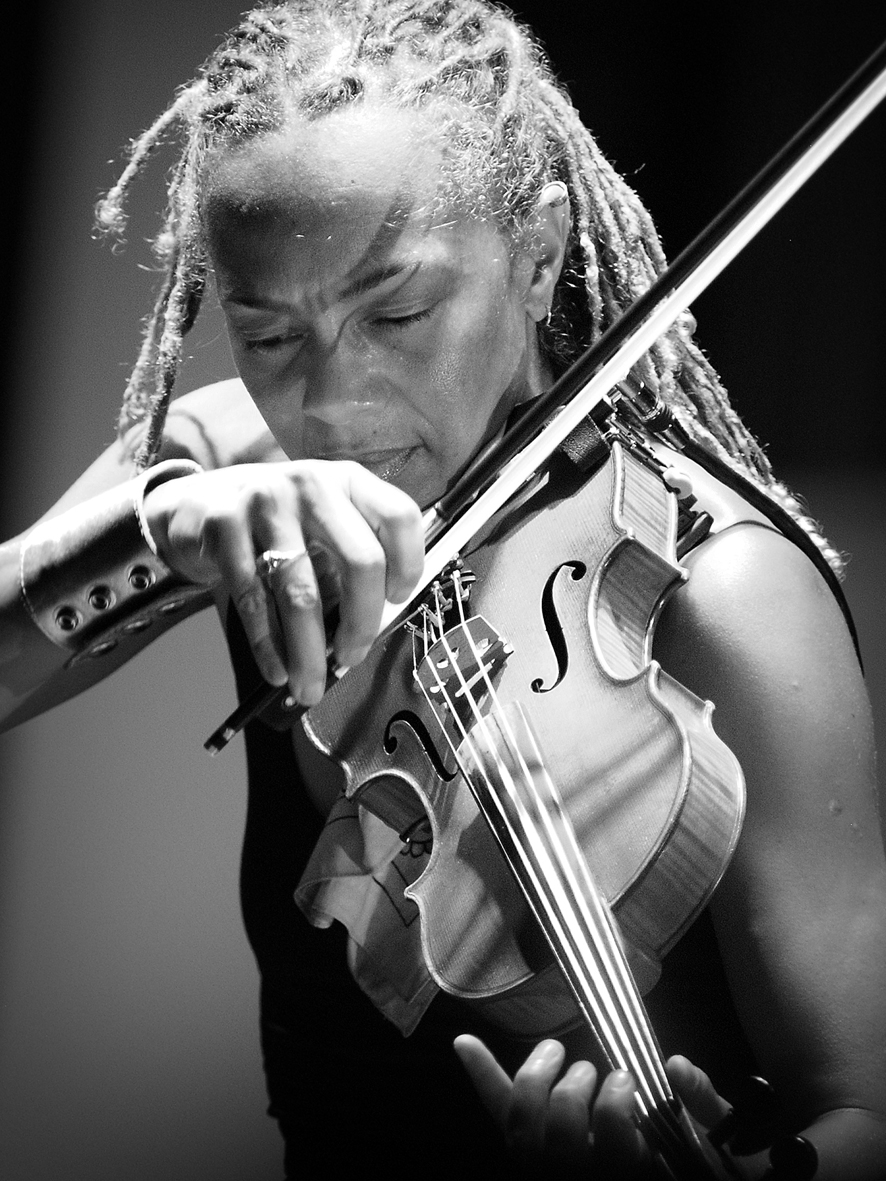
- Anne Harris at the Liri Blues Festival, Italy, in 2010

Background information
- Born: February 2, 1966 (age 60); Yellow Springs, Ohio, U.S.
- Genres: Pop rock, country, Hawaiian music
- Occupations: Singer, songwriter, violinist, recording artist, actress
- Instruments: Vocals, violin, mandolin, ukulele, tambourine
- Years active: 1997–present
- Label: Rugged Road Records
- Website: www.anneharris.com

Anne Harris (born February 2, 1966) is an American singer, songwriter, violinist, recording artist, and actress based in Chicago, Illinois. She has independently produced and released six studio albums on her record label, Rugged Road Records: Anne Harris (2001), Open Your Doors (2003), Wine and Poetry (2005), Gravity and Faith (2008), Come Hither (2015) and Roots (2019). A live album, Live at the Acorn Theater, was released in 2008.

== Early life and education ==
Harris grew up in Yellow Springs, Ohio, home of Antioch College. The earthy, liberal and progressive environment of her hometown remains an influence in her songwriting to this day. She began studying classical violin at the age of eight and eventually attended the University of Michigan in Ann Arbor where she earned a degree from the School of Music.

== Career ==
After college, Harris moved to Chicago and worked as an actor in theater and commercials for a few years before returning to music around 1997. She worked for a while with a number of local Chicago bands, notably Poi Dog Pondering, building a strong reputation for her instrumental talent. Over time she began writing and performing her own music.

Along with her recorded work, Harris has performed at the North by Northeast music festival in Toronto, Ontario, Canada, has sung the U.S. National Anthem at a Chicago Cubs baseball game and was awarded "Album Artwork of the Year" honors at the 2006 DIY Music Festival in Los Angeles for her Wine and Poetry CD packaging.

Harris continues to play violin with other notable national artists. From 2009 into 2018, she toured and recorded with trance-blues innovator and 2009 Blues Music Award winner, Otis Taylor. She also has appeared with Cathy Richardson in several formations - as a duo, in the Cathy Richardson Band, and in Jefferson Starship.

She has served an elected term on the Board of Governors of the Chicago Chapter of the National Academy of Recording Arts and Sciences.

Harris also appeared as the character "Prudence" on three episodes of Jack's Big Music Show, a music oriented children's television program on Noggin (now the Nick Jr. Channel).

== Musical style and influences ==
Her music has been described by various writers as incorporating a variety of influences, including traditional Celtic music, American folk-rock, Afrobeat, soul, and chamber music. For lack of a specific genre label, her work has been dubbed "conscious music" which refers to music and lyrics that have some basis in a spiritual, humanist philosophy.

== Discography ==
- Anne Harris (2001)
- Open Your Doors (2003)
- Wine and Poetry (2005)
- Gravity And Faith (2008)
- Live At The Acorn Theater (2008)
- Come Hither (2015)
- Roots (2019)

== See also ==
- List of popular music violinists
