= We Are...The Laurie Berkner Band =

We Are....The Laurie Berkner Band

Studio album by The Laurie Berkner Band
- Released: February 14, 2006
- Genre: Children's music
- Length: 32 minutes
- Label: Razor & Tie

The Laurie Berkner Band chronology
Under a Shady Tree (2002)	We Are....The Laurie Berkner Band (2006)	Rocketship Run (2008)

We Are....The Laurie Berkner Band is the name of both a compilation album and a DVD (and extremely rare VHS) by American children's music group The Laurie Berkner Band, both released in February 2006. It was their first DVD release, following their four best-selling CDs. We Are...The Laurie Berkner Band included the previously unreleased song "Walk Along the River". The DVD is aimed at children ranging from 2–8 years.

== Track listing ==
1. "I'm Gonna Catch You" (3:26)
2. "We Are the Dinosaurs" (2:19)
3. "Victor Vito" (2:28)
4. "Walk Along the River" (2:19)
5. "Under a Shady Tree" (2:50)
6. "Bumblebee (Buzz Buzz)" (2:53)
7. "Oh Susanna" (2:21)
8. "The Goldfish" (3:27)
9. "Pig On Her Head" (1:45)
10. "Moon Moon Moon" (1:41)
11. "Telephone" (End Credits) (1:41)

BONUS

1. "I Know a Chicken" (Behind the Scenes) (3:17)
2. "I'm a Mess" (Backstage) (0:59)
3. "Moon Moon Moon" (Learn the Moves Version) (1:41)

BONUS AUDIO DISC

1. "Walk Along the River"
2. "We Are the Dinosaurs"
3. "Telephone"
4. "I'm Gonna Catch You"
5. "The Happiest Song I Know"

Total Running Time = 46:50
