= Kongsi Raya =

Portmanteau neologism of Chinese New Year and Hari Raya Aidil Firti

Kongsi Raya, also known as Gongxi Raya, is a Malaysian portmanteau, denoting the Chinese New Year and Hari Raya Aidilfitri (Eid ul-Fitr) festivals. As the timing of these festivals fluctuate due to their reliance on lunar calendars (the Chinese calendar is a lunisolar calendar while the Islamic calendar is a purely lunar calendar), they occasionally occur close to one another – every 33 years to be exact.

== Occurrence ==
The phenomenon is observed to take place every 33 years. The last occurrence was between 1996 and 1998; the next will be between 2029 and 2031.

=== Dates of Kongsi Raya ===
Chinese New Year and Eid al-Fitr (Hari Raya Aidilfitri) dates in relation to each other
Year	Chinese New Year	Hari Raya Aidilfitri
1996	February 19	February 20
1997	February 7	February 8
1998	January 28	January 29
2029	February 13	February 15
2030	February 3	February 4
2031	January 23	January 25

== Etymology ==
For the sake of convenience, Malaysian media took to combining "kongsi" (from the traditional Chinese New Year greeting, gong xi fa cai) and "raya", the Malay word for "celebration", which is often used to denote the Muslim Eid ul-Fitr festival ("Hari Raya Aidilfitri"). Kongsi was also the Malay word for sharing - symbolizing a shared celebration. As the Hindu festival of Deepavali also occasionally occurs around Eid ul-Fitr, the portmanteau of DeepaRaya has also come into common usage.

Malaysia's national-level Kongsi Raya celebrations are now held in Johor's Danga Bay where they draw up to 300,000 people. A related portmanteau to Kongsi Raya is kongsi puasa, referring to some non-Muslims who also observe the traditional Muslim fast during Ramadhan. (Puasa being the Malay word for fast.)

== Controversy ==
Like DeepaRaya, Kongsi Raya has been criticised by some conservative Muslims for allegedly placing a Muslim festival on par with a non-Muslim one. This includes PAS, a major opposition political party, which has expressed concern that the practice of celebrating Kongsi Raya might negatively affect Muslims' aqidah (faith). Islam is the official religion of Malaysia.

== See also ==
- Chrismukkah
- Thanksgivukkah
- DeepaRaya

== Notes and references ==
=== Other references ===
- "Balik Kampung". Retrieved Nov. 1, 2005.
