= Jews and Thanksgiving =

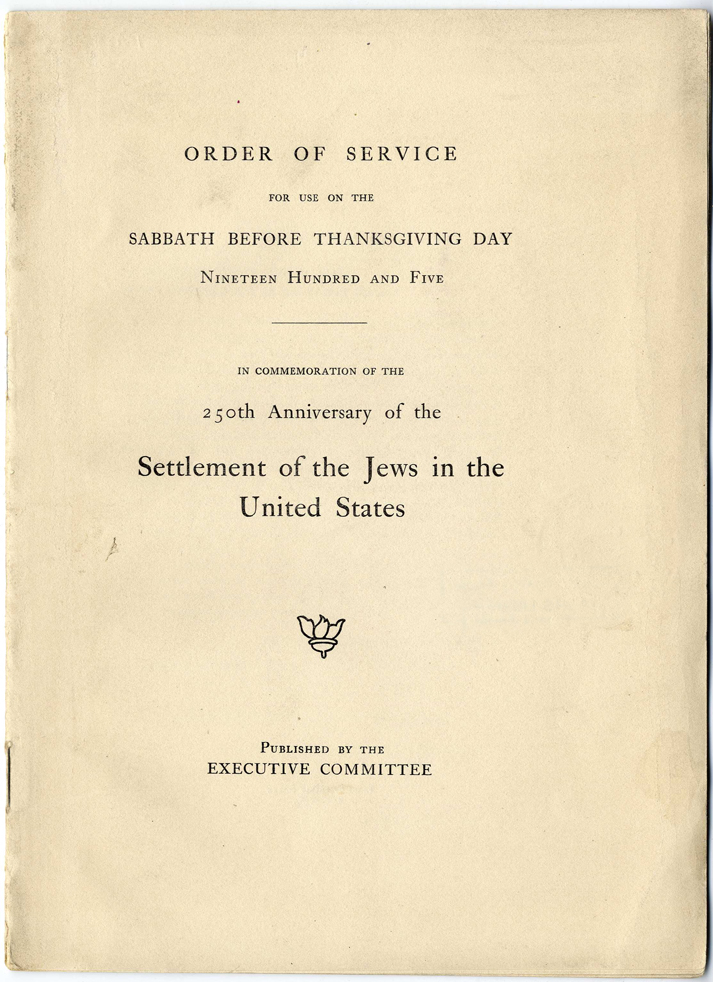
Prayers for Thanksgiving published by Congregation Shearith Israel in New York City, 1905.

The relationship between Jews and Thanksgiving is complicated due to the holiday's non-Jewish origins. Most American Jews celebrate Thanksgiving as a secular holiday. Because it is not necessarily an explicitly Christian holiday like Christmas and Easter, Thanksgiving has become one of the most popular holidays celebrated by American Jews. Some American Jews, particularly Haredi Jews, do not celebrate Thanksgiving for religious or cultural reasons, such as the Christian roots of the holiday. Most Modern Orthodox, Conservative, Reform and Reconstructionist authorities permit celebration of Thanksgiving. American Jews have celebrated Thanksgiving every year since George Washington first proclaimed Thanksgiving as a national holiday in 1789, when Manhattan's Congregation Shearith Israel, the oldest synagogue in North America, first celebrated the holiday.

== Christianity and Thanksgiving ==
=== Pilgrims and Judaism ===
As the Pilgrims of Plymouth Colony were mostly Puritans (a form of Protestantism), there were no Jews at the Pilgrims' 1621 harvest feast. However, the Pilgrims heavily identified with the Israelites in the Bible. The Pilgrims often compared their journey from England to the Americas to the Israelite Exodus from Egypt, likening the English king to pharaoh and the Atlantic Ocean to the Red Sea. In Pilgrim theology, Pilgrims were viewed as entering into a new covenant with God and North America was framed as a new Promised Land. Many Pilgrims had Hebrew names and there were even proposals to adopt Hebrew as the new language of the Plymouth Colony. The Pilgrims were not necessarily philosemitic, as many harbored anti-Jewish views and believed Jews needed to convert to Christianity.

Because the Jewish holiday of Sukkot is a harvest festival, some have suggested that the Puritans may have modeled Thanksgiving after Sukkot.

=== Halakha ===
There are different interpretations of Thanksgiving in regard to halakha (Jewish religious law). The three most common views are that Thanksgiving is permitted, that it is permitted with some limitations, or that it is forbidden. Most Jews, including most Orthodox Jews, do not view celebration of Thanksgiving as religiously problematic. The prohibition on Avodah Zarah is the prohibition on Jews imitating non-Jewish religious customs, which may be interpreted to prohibit Jewish celebration of Thanksgiving due to its Christian origins. However, many prominent Orthodox rabbis such as Rabbi Moshe Feinstein issued responsa ruling that Thanksgiving was a secular holiday and not a Christian holiday. Feinstein made four different responsa concerning Thanksgiving. In Feinstein's 1953 responsum he stated that "On the question of celebrating any event on a holiday of Gentiles, if the holiday is based on religious beliefs [by the Gentiles], such celebrations are prohibited if deliberately scheduled on that day; even without intent, it is prohibited because of marit ayin...The first day of year for them [January 1] and Thanksgiving is not prohibited according to law, but pious people [balai nephesh] should be strict." In another responsum in 1980, Feinstein stated that "it is clear that according to their religious law books this day is not mentioned as a religious holiday and that one is not obligated in a meal...and since this is a day of remembrance to citizens of this country, when they came to reside here either now or earlier, halakhah [Jewish law] sees no prohibition in celebrating with a meal or with the eating of turkey." However, Feinstein stated that Thanksgiving could not be celebrated as a religious obligation or mitzvah by Jews.

The Orthodox rabbi Joseph B. Soloveitchik ruled that Jews could celebrate Thanksgiving and eat a Thanksgiving meal, as long as the food including the turkey was kosher.

However, the Haredi rabbi Yitzchak Hutner ruled that celebrating Thanksgiving is prohibited as it is obviously a holiday based on the Christian calendar, stating that "In truth, one must distance oneself from these types of customs and even from those events that are similar to these types of customs...The truth is simple and obvious."

== Liberal denominations of Judaism ==
=== Conservative Judaism ===
Conservative Judaism permits and offers guidance for Jewish celebration of Thanksgiving. The Conservative Rabbinical Assembly provides readings and prayers for Thanksgiving.

=== Reconstructionist Judaism ===
Reconstructionist Judaism not only permits Jewish celebration of Thanksgiving, but acknowledges it as "among the most widely observed American public holidays." Because Reconstructionist Judaism teaches that Jews live in multiple civilizations, including secular ones, Thanksgiving appears in Reconstructionist prayer books (siddurim).

=== Reform Judaism ===
Reform Judaism permits and gives guidance for celebration of Thanksgiving. The Religious Action Center of Reform Judaism offers resources on how to add Jewish values to celebration of Thanksgiving and Manhattan's Central Synagogue gives guidance on how to prepare a Thanksgiving seder.

The Religious Action Center has stated that Thanksgiving is a time for the relationship between American Jews and Native Americans to be strengthened and a reminder that "Thanksgiving is a sensitive time for this community and, rather than a celebration, is for them a reminder of the long history of atrocities, persecutions, and discrimination forced upon their ancestors."

== Jewish celebration of Thanksgiving ==
Thanksgiving is one of the most commonly celebrated holidays among American Jews, in large part because it is not necessarily an explicitly Christian holiday in the way that Christmas, Easter and Halloween are.

Congregation Shearith Israel, a Sephardi Orthodox synagogue in Manhattan, has celebrated Thanksgiving since 1789. Founded in 1654, it is the oldest synagogue in North America. In 1789, following George Washington's proclamation of Thanksgiving as a national holiday, Rabbi Gershom Mendes Seixas delivered a sermon observing Thanksgiving. The synagogue has observed Thanksgiving every year since.

Among American Jews who celebrate Thanksgiving, kugel is often served for Thanksgiving dinner.

== See also ==
- Jewish assimilation
- Jews and Christmas
- Jews and Halloween
- Native American–Jewish relations
- Thanksgivukkah
