= Jack's Big Music Show =

American musical television series

- Genre: Children's music Puppetry
- Created by: David Rudman; Todd Hannert; Adam Rudman
- Written by: Emily Rudman (#1-3, 6-26); Carrie Torn-Fisher (#4-5)
- Directed by: David Rudman
- Starring: David Rudman; Alice Dinnean; John Kennedy
- Voices of: Cathy Richardson
- Country of origin: United States
- Original language: English
- No. of seasons: 2
- No. of episodes: 26

Production
- Executive producers: David Rudman; Todd Hannert; Adam Rudman
- Production location: Chicago, Illinois
- Running time: 22 minutes
- Production company: Spiffy Pictures

Original release
- Network: Noggin
- Release: September 12, 2005 – October 13, 2007

Jack's Big Music Show is an American musical children's television series produced for the Noggin channel. It was created and executive produced by David Rudman, Todd Hannert, and Adam Rudman through their company Spiffy Pictures. The series premiered on Noggin on September 12, 2005. It ran for a total of 26 episodes over two seasons. The last episode aired on October 13, 2007.

The popularity of the show made the idea of appearing on it attractive to musicians. An executive from Noggin in 2006 said that they were "clamoring to get onto Jack's Big Music Show." In 2008, the show was nominated for a Daytime Emmy Award for Outstanding Pre-School Children's Series.

== Premise ==
The series focuses on music-loving Jack, his best friend Mary, and his drumming dog Mel, all of whom are puppets. The show takes place in Jack's backyard clubhouse and centers on the characters' passion for music. The characters play music in every episode and are often accompanied by other puppets or human musicians. Each episode starts with Jack's off-screen mom calling him that he has to leave for an activity soon. Each episode also usually features two music videos by children's musical artists and a performance by the Schwartzman Quartet about the episode's theme. At the end of each episode, a big "finale" song is played. Sometimes, Jack leaves and tells his mom what they did today, while other times they continue to play music in the clubhouse. Mel can be seen popping up during the credits.

== Characters ==
=== Main ===
The main characters are Jack, Mary, Mel, and the Schwartzman Quartet.

- Jack (performed and voiced by David Rudman) is a young guitarist who has a backyard clubhouse full of musical instruments. He is a blue mouse-like creature who has a very busy schedule, and at the beginning of each episode, his unseen mother mentions a new class or activity that he is attending. He is named after Jack Benny, the host of The Jack Benny Program.
- Mary (performed and voiced by Alice Dinnean) is Jack's best friend, an accordionist. She is a yellow mouse-like creature who is smart, attentive, and likes to find music in unexpected places. Her catchphrase is "What a day!", which she says at the end of each episode. She is named after Mary Livingstone from The Jack Benny Program.
- Mel (performed and voiced by John Kennedy) is Jack's pink and green dog, a drummer and gifted inventor. He has created all of the contraptions in Jack's clubhouse, including the music video player, and operates them in each episode. He can only talk through barking, but Jack understands him. He is named after Mel Blanc from The Jack Benny Program.
- The Schwartzman Quartet (performed and voiced by various puppeteers) are a barbershop quartet of four mouse-like brothers who visit Jack's clubhouse in each episode to sing a short song. Almost identical to one another, they are all turquoise with stringy red hair, freckles, and matching striped sweaters. They are named after the Sportsmen Quartet from The Jack Benny Program.

=== Guests (puppets) ===
- Earl the Squirrel appears in "Mel's Super Swell Dance Party", "Silly Show", "Leonard the Country Squirrel", "Snow Day", and "Jack's Big Orchestra".
- The Little Bad Wolf (performed and voiced by Eric Jacobson) appears in the episode of the same name and "Jack's Big Orchestra".
- The Bongo Birds appear in the episode of the same name and "Jack's Big Orchestra".
- The Bugs appear in "Bug Love" and "Jack's Big Orchestra".
- Henry the Monster (performed and voiced by Joey Mazzarino) appears in "The Music Monster" and "Jack's Big Orchestra".
- The Squirrels appear in "Leonard the Country Squirrel", "Jack's Big Orchestra" and "Jack's Super Swell Sing-Along".
- M.C. Turtle (performed and voiced by Matt Vogel) appears in "Jack's Super Swell Sing-Along".
- Sheldon the Squirrel (performed and voiced by John Kennedy) appears in "The Grumpy Squirrel" and "Jack's Big Orchestra".
- Gertrude the Groundhog (performed and voiced by Stephanie D'Abruzzo) appears in "Groundhog Day".
- Scat Cat (performed and voiced by Stephanie D'Abruzzo) appears in the episode of the same name.
- Phil the Coo-Coo Bird (performed and voiced by Eric Jacobson) appears in the episode of the same name.
- Leonard the Country Squirrel (performed and voiced by Matt Vogel) appears in the episode of the same name.
- Spunky the Alien (performed and voiced by Joey Mazzarino) appears in the episode of the same name.
- Royal Messenger Marvin (performed and voiced by John Kennedy) appears in "King of Swing".

=== Guests (humans) ===
- Yolanda Adams
- Angélique Kidjo
- Laurie Berkner
- Andrew Bird
- Buddy Guy
- Steve Burns
- Steven Drozd
- Comic Book Heroes
- Guy Davis
- The Dirty Sock Funtime Band
- Rebecca Frezza
- Jerry Lawson
- Leon Thomas III
- The Mighty Weaklings
- Milkshake
- Lisa Loeb
- David Weinstone
- Jamia Simone Nash
- Nuttin' But Stringz
- David Pleasant
- Cathy Richardson
- Sweet Honey in the Rock
- Jon Stewart
- Trachtenburg Family Slideshow Players
- The Quiet Two
- Anne Harris as Prudence
- Hot Peas 'N Butter
- Tracey Ellert
- J. Walter Hawkes
- Susie Lampert
- Rebekah Jordan
- Justin Roberts
- Cheryl Hines
- AudraRox
- Tyler Bunch

== Episodes ==
=== Series overview ===
Season	Episodes	Originally released	
Season	Episodes	First released	Last released
1	13	September 12, 2005	February 13, 2006
2	13	January 6, 2007	October 13, 2007

=== Season 1 (2005–06) ===
No. overall	No. in season	Title	Guests	Songs	Original release date
1	1	"Little Bad Wolf"	Laurie Berkner; The Dirty Sock Funtime Band	"Mary Had an Accordion" (tune: "Mary Had a Little Lamb"), "The Little Bad Wolf Had a Tuba" (also sung to the tune: "Mary Had a Little Lamb"), "Twinkle, Twinkle, Little Star", "My Energy", "Music Everywhere"	September 12, 2005
2	2	"How Mel Got His Groove Back"	Cathy Richardson; Laurie Berkner; Sweet Honey in the Rock	"Listen to the Animals", "Every Animal Has Its Groove", "Mel the Meowing Dog" (sung to the tunes: "Twinkle, Twinkle, Little Star", "The Alphabet Song", and "Baa, Baa, Black Sheep"), "Mister", "I Like It That Way"	September 14, 2005
3	3	"The Music Genie"	Anne Harris; Hot Peas 'N Butter; Laurie Berkner	"Mel's Musical Trunk" (tune: "99 Bottles of Beer"), "Prudence", "Yodel", "Number 1", "Under a Shady Tree"	September 15, 2005
4	4	"The Bongo Bird"	Laurie Berkner; Jamia	"Yeah Yeah Yeah", "The Song of the Bongo Bird", "Bongo Bird Beat", "Bongo Bird Lullaby" (tune: "Brahms' Lullaby"), "I Know a Chicken", "Bongo" (sung to the tune Bingo)	September 19, 2005
5	5	"Marching Band"	Cathy Richardson; Laurie Berkner; Milkshake	"Marching Song", "Rain Rain Go Away", "Rhythms Around You", "Boots", "Bottle of Sunshine"	September 26, 2005
6	6	"Bug Love"	Rebecca Frezza; Laurie Berkner	"Loud Sound/Soft Sound", "A Pretty Good Bug", "Bugs Are Really Swell" (tune: "The Farmer in the Dell"), "B3", "I'm Me and You're You"	October 3, 2005
7	7	"Mel's Super Swell Dance Party"	Tracey Ellert; Cathy Richardson; Yolanda Adams; The Dirty Sock Funtime Band; Laurie Berkner	"Dance How You Like", "The Mel Polka", "Rock and Roll Freeze Dance", "The Me Dance", "Dino-Sauring", "I Really Love to Dance"	October 10, 2005
8	8	"Space Opera"	Jerry Lawson and the Talk of the Town; Laurie Berkner	"Mary's Opera" (3 songs; one of the songs is sung to the tune of the Toreador Song from Carmen), "Space Explorer", "Space Opera", "What Are They Gonna Do About That?", "I'm Glad", "I'm Not Perfect"	October 10, 2005
9	9	"Grow Daddio"	Cathy Richardson; Rebecca Frezza; Laurie Berkner	"Where is Mary?" (tune: "Ten Little Indians"), "What Will Arthur Grow Up to Be?", "Playin' Jazz", "Mary, Mary, Quite Contrary", "H_{2}O + O_{2} + Sun", "Running Down the Hill"	October 17, 2005
10	10	"The Grumpy Squirrel"	David Weinstone; Laurie Berkner	"It's Fun to Invent Your Own Instrument", "Brahms' Lullaby" (instrumental), "Music is the Best", "Grumpy" "I'm Gonna Catch You", "Row, Row, Row Your Boat"	October 24, 2005
11	11	"The Music Monster"	Laurie Berkner; Milkshake	"This Song", "If You're Scary and You Know It" (tune: "If You're Happy and You Know It"), "Monster Boogie", "Scared"	October 31, 2005
12	12	"King of Swing"	Buddy Guy; Laurie Berkner; Guy Davis	"The Welcome Song" (sung to the tunes "Let's All Go to the Lobby" from Regal Cinemas, "For He's a Jolly Good Fellow", and "The Bear Went Over the Mountain"), "List", "Shama Lama", "Clean It Up", "New Shoes"	February 6, 2006
13	13	"Silly Show"	Laurie Berkner; Hot Peas 'N Butter	"Silly Things" (sung to the tunes of "Twinkle, Twinkle, Little Star", "The ABC Song", "Baa, Baa, Black Sheep", "Turkey in the Straw", "The Parade of the Tin Soldiers" , and "Do Your Ears Hang Low?"), "Bologna Sandwich", "Googleheads", "Deep Down"	February 13, 2006

=== Season 2 (2007) ===
No. overall	No. in season	Title	Guests	Songs	Original release date
14	1	"Snow Day"	Anne Harris; Laurie Berkner; The Quiet Two	"Beach Party", "Wiki Wiki Hele Hele", "Sing a Winter Song", "Mahalo", "Polar Bear"	January 6, 2007
15	2	"Leonard the Country Squirrel"	Laurie Berkner; The Dirty Sock Funtime Band	"Found Sounds", "We're a Jugband", "Jugband Jamboree", "I Am a Sad Squirrel", "I Am a Happy Squirrel", "Farm Song", "No Good Reason Party"	January 7, 2007
16	3	"Spunky the Alien"	The Mighty Weaklings (featuring Matt Vogel); Laurie Berkner	"Yo Yo Yo", "Gotta Power Up", "Spunky's Lament", "Fleeber", "Rocketship", "Rocketship Run"	January 13, 2007
17	4	"Jack Bunny"	Anne Harris; Laurie Berkner; Angélique Kidjo	"Mel the Musical Magical Magician", "The Hop", "Bugle Bunnies", "Magic Box", "Wombo Lombo"	January 14, 2007
18	5	"Phil the Coo-Coo Bird"	David Weinstone; Laurie Berkner	"The Twisty Twist", "The Dance", "Phil, Phil, Keep On Trying", "Move Your Feet", "Who's That?"	January 20, 2007
19	6	"Jack's Big Oops!"	Andrew Bird; J. Walter Hawkes; Nuttin' But Stringz	"Strings", "Dr. Strings", "Just Tell the Truth", "What Else Have I Got to Lose?", "Thunder"	January 21, 2007
20	7	"Jack's Big Orchestra"	Laurie Berkner; Dirty Sock Funtime Band	"Being a Conductor Would Rock", "Sneaks", "Can-Can", "Super Spies", "La gazza ladra (overture)"	January 27, 2007
21	8	"Scat Cat"	Laurie Berkner; Trachtenburg Family Slideshow Players	"I Have a Friend (Super Swell Friends)", "Scat-Scat-a-Tat-Tat", "The Wiggle Dance", "The Cat Came Back", "You're the One Who's Made for Me and I Was Made for You"	January 28, 2007
22	9	"Groundhog Day"	Steve Burns and Steven Drozd; Jon Stewart; Laurie Berkner	"Hip Hip Hooray for Groundhog Day", "First Day of Preschool", "When Will Spring Be Sprung?", "I Hog the Ground", "I Had a Friend"	February 2, 2007
23	10	"Jack's Super Swell Sing-Along"	Laurie Berkner & Susie Lampert; Rebekah Jordan; Justin Roberts; Lisa Loeb	"Sing-Along Song", "Let's Samba", "Just Stopped By", "Down at the Barbershop", "Kelly Green", "I Like to Rap", "This Is Zydeco", "Jenny Jenkins"	February 3, 2007
24	11	"Laurie's Big Song"	Laurie Berkner; Comic Book Heroes; Leon Thomas	"Get on the Train", "A Little Bitty Rhythm", "You Can't Call an Elephant Without an Elephant Call", "Purple People Eater", "Duck 4"	February 4, 2007
25	12	"Mel's Bath Day"	Cheryl Hines; Laurie Berkner; AudraRox	"You Must Take a Bath", "Super Sudsy Bubblestein Bubbles" (to the tune of "London Bridge"), "I'm a Mess", "I Hope My Mama Says Yes", "A Bath is Alright"	February 10, 2007
26	13	"Jack and the Beanstalk"	Tyler Bunch; Laurie Berkner; David Pleasant	"Up", "Shala-La-La", "Anyone Can Make a Song", "In the Clouds", "Deegah Joyah"	October 13, 2007

== Influences ==
In an interview on the Nick Jr. website, Rudman says that The Jack Benny Show was an influence on Jack's Big Music Show (along with The Little Rascals).

The names Jack, Mary, Mel, and the "Schwartzman Quartet" are references to characters on The Jack Benny Program (Jack Benny, Mary Livingstone, Mel Blanc, and the Sportsmen Quartet). Other name references to Jack Benny Program regulars include Sheldon and Leonard (Sheldon Leonard), Phil the Coo-Coo Bird (Phil Harris), and Gertrude the Groundhog (Bea Benaderet's recurring character Gertrude Gearshift).

Hannert says that the music is influenced by Chuck Berry and the whole history of rock and roll.

== Broadcast ==
The premiere episode was simulcast on both Noggin and its sister channel, Nickelodeon, on September 12, 2005. In May 2007, production was cancelled and it was announced that no more episodes would be produced. However, it continued to rerun on the Nick Jr. Channel until December 26, 2014. The last episodes to air as a part of the show's final rerun were "Snow Day" and "The Grumpy Squirrel" as part of the Nick Jr. Holiday Party.
