= Jews and Halloween =

Relationship between Jews and Halloween

The relationship between Jews and Halloween is complicated, due to the Christian and pagan roots of Halloween. Many Jews in Western countries celebrate Halloween as a secular holiday. However, many Jews do not celebrate Halloween for religious or cultural reasons. Orthodox Jews typically do not celebrate Halloween, but liberal denominations of Judaism such as the Reform movement permit celebrating the holiday. The Jewish holiday of Purim has often been compared to Halloween, due to the wearing of costumes during the holiday. Halloween is also a day that some Jews, especially those who are visibly Jewish such as Orthodox Jews, may associate with antisemitic harassment and violence.

== Jewish celebration of Halloween ==
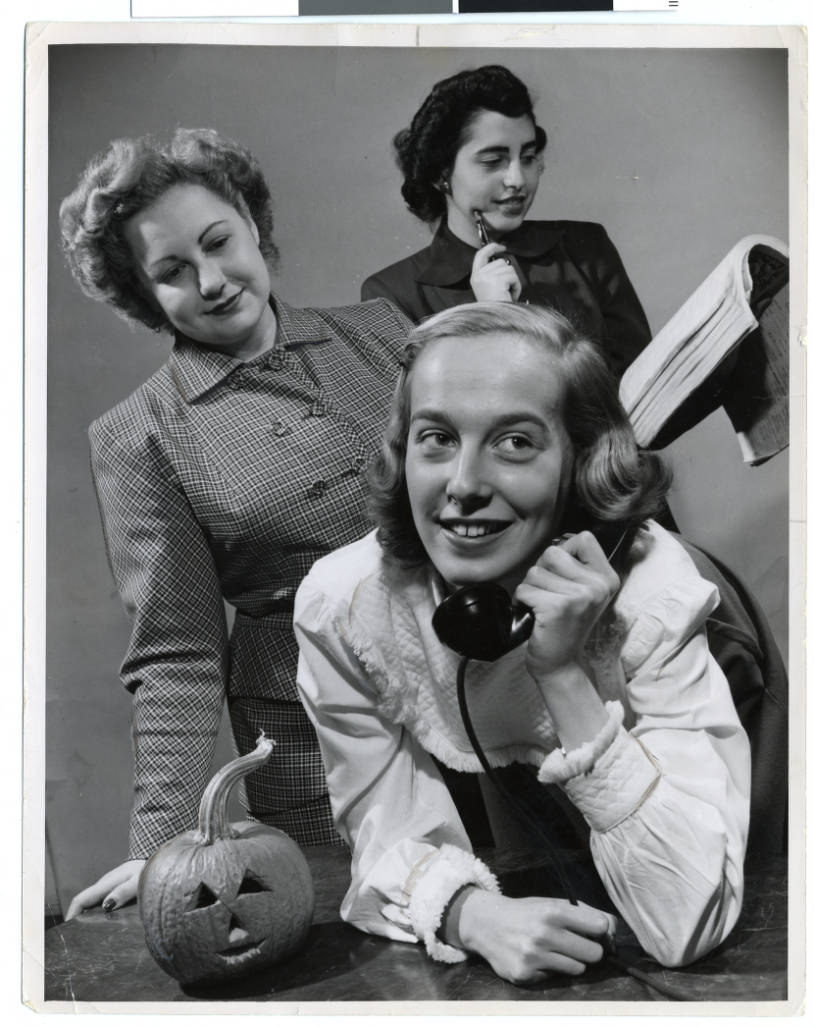
B'nai B'rith Young Women's Organization planning their Halloween fundraiser, the Broomstick Ball, 1948.

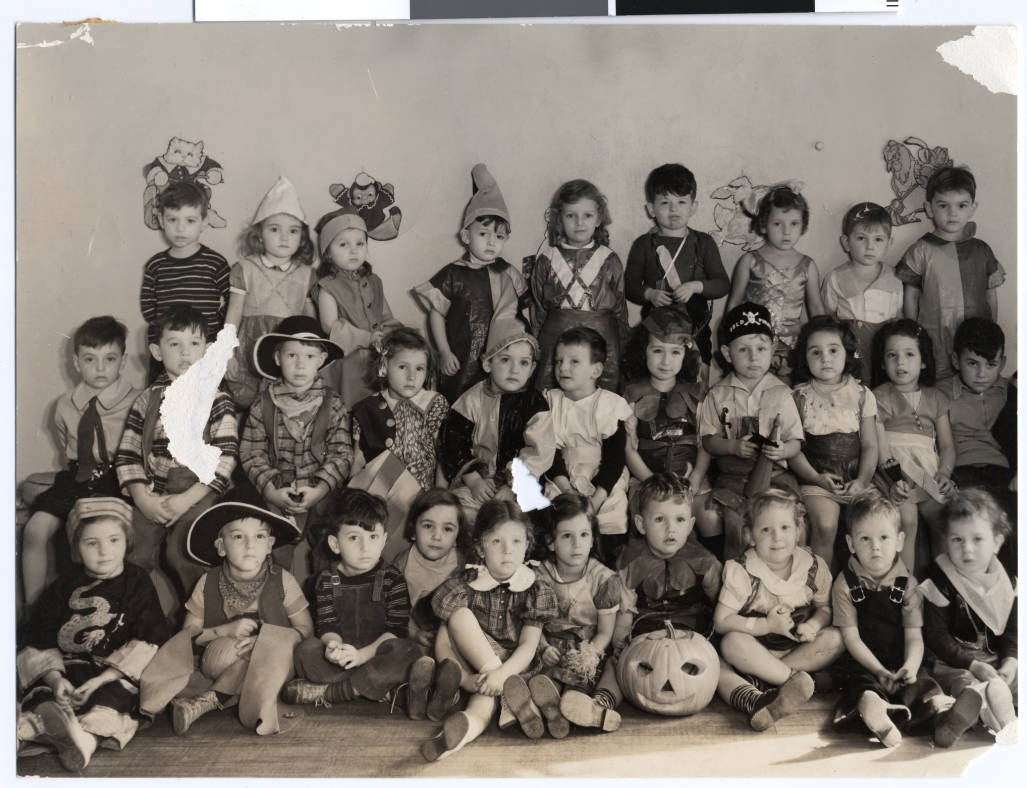
Halloween party at the St. Paul Jewish Educational Center, 1937.

Many American Jews celebrate Halloween, disconnected from its Christian and Pagan origins. American Jews who celebrate Halloween are likely to view it as a secular holiday, little different from Thanksgiving or the Fourth of July. Secular Jews and non-Orthodox Jews are more likely to celebrate Halloween. According to Kveller magazine, many, if not the majority of American Jews, consider Halloween to be "harmless fun". Many Jewish parents allow their children to wear costumes and go trick-or-treating during Halloween.

== Religious views on Halloween ==
According to Alfred J. Kolatch in the Second Jewish Book of Why, in Judaism, Halloween is not permitted by halakha (Jewish religious law) because it violates Leviticus 18:3, which forbids Avodah Zarah, Jewish participation in non-Jewish religious customs. Trick-or-treating can be problematic for Jews who keep kosher, because some Halloween candies are not kosher. However, much of the popular candies in the United States are certified kosher.

=== Orthodox Judaism ===
Orthodox Judaism generally prohibits the celebration of Halloween. Modern Orthodox Jews typically do not celebrate Halloween. Some Modern Orthodox parents may allow certain leniencies such as allowing their children to eat kosher Halloween candy or visit haunted houses, but otherwise do not participate. Orthodox Rabbi Michael Broyde opposes Jewish celebration of Halloween because the holiday "plainly has in its origins religious beliefs that are foreign to Judaism" and that are "prohibited to us as Jews." Rabbi Broyde also acknowledged that the majority of Americans and American Jews who celebrate Halloween are not doing so for religious reasons. Rabbi Jack Abramowitz of the Orthodox Union has discouraged Jewish celebration of Halloween due to its "combination of Celtic, Roman and Christian" elements that are "distinctly non-Jewish", characterizing Halloween as a non-secular holiday.

=== Reform Judaism ===
The Union for Reform Judaism emphasizes that "informed choice" is the most important facet in whether Reform Jews do or do not celebrate Halloween. Reform Rabbi Jeffrey Goldwasser has said that "There is no religious reason why contemporary Jews should not celebrate Halloween."

== Comparisons between Halloween and Jewish customs ==
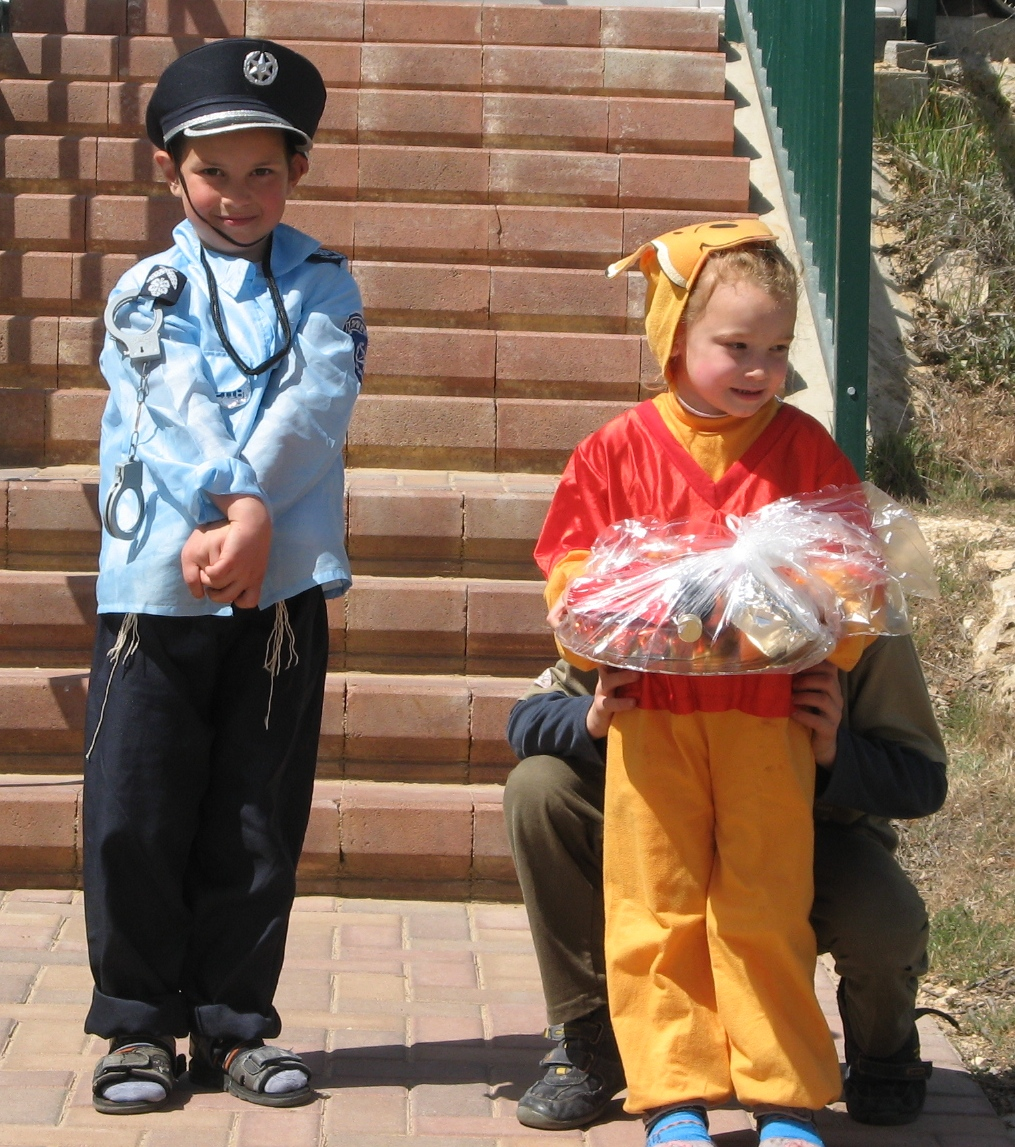
Children with mishloach manot during Purim, March 2008.

Purim has sometimes been compared to Halloween, in part due to some observants wearing costumes, especially of Biblical figures described in the Purim narrative. The Purim custom of giving mishloach manot has been compared to the Halloween tradition of giving candy. Purim has sometimes been referred to as the "Jewish Halloween" or "anti-Halloween." However, some consider terms like "Jewish Halloween" to be a misnomer due to the major differences between the holidays.

Halloween and the Jewish holiday of Sukkot both occur during the fall in the Gregorian calendar, with Sukkot coming before Halloween. Sukkot is typically celebrated in September or October. Neighborhoods where both Jews and non-Jews live may have both sukkahs and Halloween decorations up during the months of September and October. In contrast to Halloween's focus on death, Sukkot is a celebration of life.

Many Jews observe Yizkor communally four times a year, which is vaguely similar to the observance of Allhallowtide in Christianity, in the sense that prayers are said for both "martyrs and for one's own family".

== See also ==
- Jewish assimilation
- Jews and Christmas
- Jews and Thanksgiving
