= Chrismukkah =

Merging of Christmas and Hanukkah

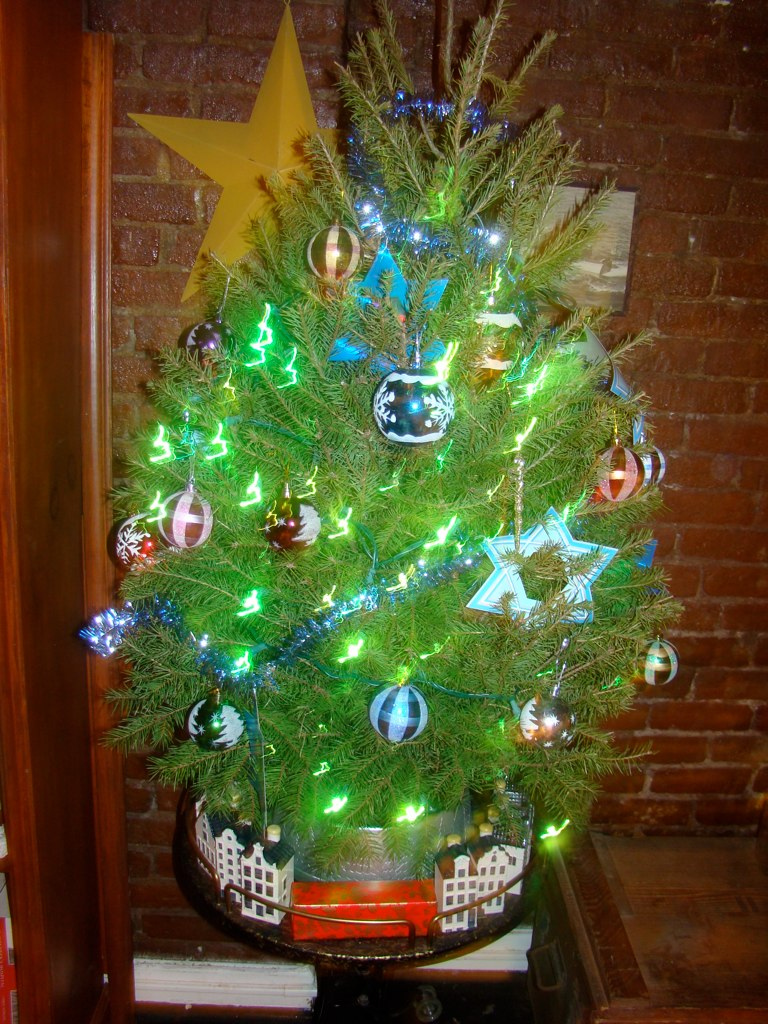
A Hanukkah bush that some Jewish families display in their homes for the duration of Hanukkah and Christmas. Unlike a Christmas tree it would be without any Christianity-themed ornaments and use the colour blue.

Chrismukkah is a pop-culture portmanteau neologism referring to the merging of the holidays of Christianity's Christmas and Judaism's Hanukkah. It first arose in the German-speaking countries within middle-class Jews of the 19th century. After World War II, Chrismukkah became particularly popular in the United States, but is also celebrated in other countries.

The term was popularized beginning in December 2003 by the TV drama The O.C., wherein character Seth Cohen creates the holiday to signify his upbringing in an interfaith household with a Jewish father and Protestant mother. The holiday can also be adopted by all-Jewish households who celebrate Christmas as a secular holiday.

== History ==
The proximity of the beginning of the Hanukkah festival on the 25th of Kislev (the end of November/December) to Christmas led to the so-called "December Dilemma" for Jewish families living in societies that were largely Christian. The history of an informal merger between Hanukkah and Christmas dates back to 19th century Germany and Austria. In German, it is called Weihnukka, a combination of the words "Weihnachten" (Christmas) and "Hanukkah".

In the 19th century, Christmas had established itself in the German-speaking countries as a festival in which, in addition to the spiritual significance, values such as family and charity were in the foreground. Christmas customs such as the Christmas tree, Christmas decorations, gifts or Christmas dinner were perceived more as a seasonal than a strictly Christian tradition. The proximity of the beginning of the Hanukkah festival to Christmas and the adoption of various traditions such as a decorated tree or gifts led to a mixture of traditions that were referred to as Weihnukka at the time. Modern Jewish families in particular adopted elements of the Christmas tradition in the Hanukkah festival. For example, Hanukkah gifts or money became common in the 19th century. Many families from the assimilated German-Jewish bourgeoisie celebrated Christmas directly as a purely secular winter festival. The first historically documented Christmas tree was erected in Vienna in 1814 by the Jewish socialite Fanny von Arnstein, who had brought this custom from Berlin. Theodor Herzl, the founder of Zionism, also celebrated Christmas, or at least allowed a tree to be set up in his house for his children, suggesting the name "Hanukkah tree". Common elements of this secular Christmas festival and its influence on the Hanukkah festival among Jews were a Hanukkah tree or Hanukkah bush, as a counterpart to the Christmas tree; the Hanukkah Man, who, as a counterpart to Santa Claus, brought the presents for the children; or the Hanukkah calendar, with eight flaps.

After the Holocaust, many Jews immigrated to the United States. Here, it became common to celebrate both festivals due to interfaith marriages between Jews and Christians and the associated wish of both partners to maintain their respective festivals and customs. The so-called "December dilemma" arose in Jewish families, namely the desire to add something similar to the popular festival of Christmas with its traditions, celebrations and gifts. Gifts for the Hanukkah festival in particular were to enhance this festival and contrast Christmas with something of equal emotional value.

In the 1990s, the popular sitcom Friends often portrayed Jewish characters Rachel, Ross and Monica celebrating Christmas with their Christian friends, signifying many contemporary American Jewish households who celebrate Christmas in the strictly secular sense.

Chrismukkah was named for the first time, and prominently featured, in the FOX television program The O.C. (2003–2007). Show creator Josh Schwartz used the holiday (which the writers almost named "Hanimas") to depict, he later said,

[M]y experience as a Jewish kid from the East Coast coming to USC ... and being surrounded by all these kids from Newport Beach who were water-polo players, and these very blonde girls who only wanted to date them. I felt very much like an outsider. Even trying to talk about Hanukkah with some of them was like coming from an alien planet and talking about life there. The show is really about outsiders: Ryan was the most obvious outsider, as was Seth. The idea of a mixed [half-Jewish, half-Christian] family in Newport would also contribute to the Cohen outsider-family status. That part of their identity was always very important. Seth coined a holiday that would both celebrate and underline his outsider status in Newport. That led us to Chrismukkah.

On The O.C., as a way to merge his parents' two faiths, Seth Cohen claims to have "created the greatest superholiday known to mankind" when he was six years old. The series included annual Chrismukkah episodes for every season of its run. Particulars of when exactly the holiday was celebrated were not given; Seth simply said in the first season's Chrismukkah episode that it was "eight days of presents, followed by one day of many presents," with a stress on the word "many" (this was repeated in the second season's Chrismukkah episode by Seth's new brother Ryan, with an added "many"). The only references to how it was celebrated, other than the family displaying both a Christmas tree and a Hanukkah menorah, was that the Cohens spent Christmas Day itself at home eating Chinese takeout and watching movies like It's a Wonderful Life and Fiddler on the Roof on TV (as opposed to going out for Chinese food and seeing a movie, as many American Jews have done for years). Chrismukkah later received mention in the television series Grey's Anatomy.

In 2004, Chrismukkah.com was launched by Ron and Michelle Gompertz, a Jewish-Christian intermarried couple in Bozeman, Montana. Their website took the fictional O.C. Chrismukkah and brought it into reality, selling humorous Chrismukkah greeting cards and dispensing detailed mythology about the fictional holiday. The Chrismukkah.com website was widely credited with popularizing Chrismukkah to a non-television watching audience. Chrismukkah.com stirred up controversy in the Fall of 2004, when the New York Catholic League issued a national press release opposing Chrismukkah. Further, The Catholic League and the New York Board of Rabbis, in a joint statement, condemned Chrismukkah as "insulting" to Jews and Christians.

In December 2004, Chrismukkah was listed in Time magazine as one of the buzzwords of the year. It was also reported in a Scottish newspaper, that Chrismukkah had been added to the authoritative "Chambers" dictionary. In 2005, Chrismukkah.com founder Ron Gompertz authored a humorous book of Chrismukkah recipes called Chrismukkah! The Merry Mish-Mash Holiday Cookbook. Gompertz's follow-up book, entitled Chrismukkah – Everything You Need to Know to Celebrate the Hybrid Holiday (published by Stewart, Tabori and Chang) was released in October 2006. A rival book by Gersh Kuntzman, Chrismukkah: The Official Guide to the World's Best-Loved Holiday (Sasquatch Press), came out at around the same time. In A Kosher Christmas: 'Tis the Season to Be Jewish (Rutgers University Press, 2013), author Rabbi Joshua Eli Plaut, Ph.D. discusses Chrismukkah and the creation of Festivus and other hybrid holidays among Jews in America during December. In 2006, USA Today described Chrismukkah as "[t]he newest faux holiday that companies are using to make a buck this season". Chrismukkah is also celebrated as an ironic, alternative holiday, much like the Seinfeld-derived "Festivus".

The Jewish Museum Berlin held a special exhibition about Weihnukka in 2005.

== Exact coincidence of Hanukkah with Christmas ==
In 2005, the sunset of December 25 coincided with 25 Kislev, the first night of Hanukkah, making Christmas Day and the beginning of Hanukkah the same day. This happened again in 2024 and will again in 2035. In 2016, the sunset of December 24 coincided with 25 Kislev, the first day of Hanukkah, making Christmas Eve and the beginning of Hanukkah the same day. This will not happen again until 2027.

== Similar holidays ==
A similarly named holiday called Christmanukkah was featured in The Strangerhood. Unlike Chrismukkah, Christmanukkah is twenty days long (twelve days of Christmas and another eight for Hanukkah), and all of the days are spent receiving gifts and eating until passing out. Pants and pumpkin cider are considered a traditional gift.

Hannumass was created by Boyz II Men singer Wanya Morris and his wife. Referenced in ABC's A Very Boy Band Holiday.

Similar neologisms such as Chrismahanukwanzakah and HanuKwanzMas blend Christmas, Hanukkah, and Kwanzaa.

== See also ==
- Thanksgivukkah
- Messianic Judaism
- DeepaRaya
- Festivus
- Hanukkah bush
- Hanukkah Harry
- Kongsi Raya
- Nittel Nacht
- Winterval
