= The Dirty Sock Funtime Band =

American children's music rock band

The Dirty Sock Funtime Band was an American rock band based in New York City. "A rock band for kids that really rocks," in the words of Chris Barron of the Spin Doctors, who is a featured vocalist on the band’s songs “The Scarephants” from the CD "Mr. Clown and the Day the Sun Got Wet" and the song “Kitty Cat Yeah” from the album "The Dirty Socks Come Clean". They were featured on the Noggin TV program Jack's Big Music Show. They were also invited to compose music for a Nick Jr. recycling PSA titled "Playful Parent", and band member Mike Messer sang a rocked-up version of the Wonder Pets theme for a commercial promoting the show's new season at the time. They won a 2006 Time Out NY Kids Reader's Choice Award for Best NYC-Based Kids' Band.

The group silently retired after 2020. Mike Messer continues to perform and release music as a solo artist, releasing music under the band names Adoraborealis and Gleek Lub.

== Members ==
=== Final lineup ===
- Mike Messer – vocals and guitar
- Stephen Jacobs – vocals and guitar
- Adam Jacobs (Mr. Clown) – vocals and guitar
- William Phillips (Billy Z) – guitar
- Ty Citerman – guitar
- Jasper Leak – bass guitar
- Sean Dixon – drums
- Ken Thomson – saxophone, clarinet, and flute
- Annie Elmer – dancer

=== Former members ===
- Uwe Petersen – drums
- Eric Rockwin – bass guitar and vocals
- Paul Chuffo – drums
- Nadine Nassar – dancer
- Diana Ferrante – dancer

== Discography ==
=== CDs ===
- Search & Rescue of Genius Backpack (2003)
- Mr. Clown and the Day the Sun Got Wet (2004)
- Sock-A-Delic (2010)
- The Dirty Socks Come Clean (2013)
