= Nittel Nacht =

Yiddish name for Christmas Eve

Nittel Nacht (ניטל נאַכט) (Note: Known in Hebrew as Leil HaNital (לֵיל הַנִיטָל or לֵיל הַנִיתָל), also called Blinde Nacht (בלינדע נאַכט, 'Blind Night'), Vay Nacht ('Woe Night'), Goyim Nacht ('Gentiles' Night'), Tole Nacht ('Night of the Crucified One'), Yoyzls Nacht ('Jesus Night'), Finstere Nacht ('Dark Night'), or Moyredike Nacht ('Fearful Night').) or Nittel is a name given to Christmas Eve by Jewish scholars as early as the late 16th century. In some Hasidic communities, the evening is marked by refraining from Torah study and engaging instead in recreational activities.

== Etymology ==
The Yiddish word "Nittel" for Christmas is likely derived from the medieval Latin name for Christmas, natalis. However, it is also often associated with the Hebrew nitleh ("the hanged one"), which was used in medieval times to refer to Jesus.

== Origin ==
The first explicit reference to the practice of avoiding Torah study appears in Rabbi Yair Bacharach's Mekor Chaim, composed sometime between 1660 and 1692, where he wrote “and there is a custom of abstaining from study on the evening of that man's [i.e., Jesus'] holiday." The first allusion to the practice of staying up late playing games appears in a Jewish communal ordinance from 1708 and was later mentioned in the work of the Chatam Sofer. In the Middle Ages in Christendom, Jews were often forbidden from appearing in public during the Christmas holidays, and Christmas Eve frequently marked the beginning of attacks on the Jewish population.

Some Jews observed Nittel Nacht as a way to avoid leaving their homes, and to avoid giving the appearance of celebrating the Christian holiday. Some also sought to avoid experiencing any pleasure or joy on Christmas, to ensure that no glory would be given to the day. Medieval or modern anti-Jewish writers such as Johann Pfefferkorn, Julius Conrad Otto, Johann Adrian, and Samuel Friedrich Brenz wrote sensationalized accounts claiming that Jews believed that on Christmas Eve, Jesus wandered through latrines as a punishment for spreading false teachings. They wrote that Jews feared that if Jesus heard them reading the Torah, he would get a respite from his suffering, so they refrained from it.

The observance of Nittel Nacht was popularized by the Baal Shem Tov in the 18th century. After the advent of the Gregorian Calendar, Orthodox Christians and Catholic Christians observed Christmas Eve on two separate dates; this led to Rabbinic debate, and Nittel Nacht is observed in accordance with the local Christian community.

== Customs ==
The most prominent custom commonly observed on Nittel Nacht is to abstain from Torah study, although historically some read the Toledot Yeshu instead. Staying up late and playing card games or chess is also popular.

This practice is largely confined to Hasidic communities and has never been widely adopted by other Jewish groups, including Litvish and Sephardic communities. In modern times, with better Jewish relations with Christianity, Nittel Nacht is less observed; however, certain Hasidic groups still observe it. The majority of these communities observes Nittel Nacht based on the Julian calendar, though some follow the Gregorian calendar, and few observe both nights.

== Criticism ==
Several prominent halachic authorities explicitly reject the practice of refraining from Torah study on Nittel Nacht. Rabbi Moshe Feinstein continued learning on Nittel Nacht and instructed his students to do likewise. The Chazon Ish studied on Nittel Nacht, criticizing those who abstained, while the Steipler Gaon studied discreetly to avoid contradicting those who observe the custom.

== See also ==
- Jews and Christmas
