= Hanukkah Harry =

Recurring character on Saturday Night Live

- Saturday Night Live character
- First appearance: December 16, 1989
- Last appearance: 1990s
- Portrayed by: Jon Lovitz

In-universe information
- Gender: Male
- Religion: Haredi Judaism
- Nationality: Israeli

Hanukkah Harry is a character on Saturday Night Live played by Jon Lovitz.

Hanukkah Harry is portrayed on the show as a variation upon the modern-day image of Santa Claus, with a beard characteristic of a male adherent of Haredi Judaism, and with his hat in blue with white edges (the colors of an Ashkenazi Jewish tallit, or prayer shawl, shared by the flag of Israel).

== Saturday Night Live ==
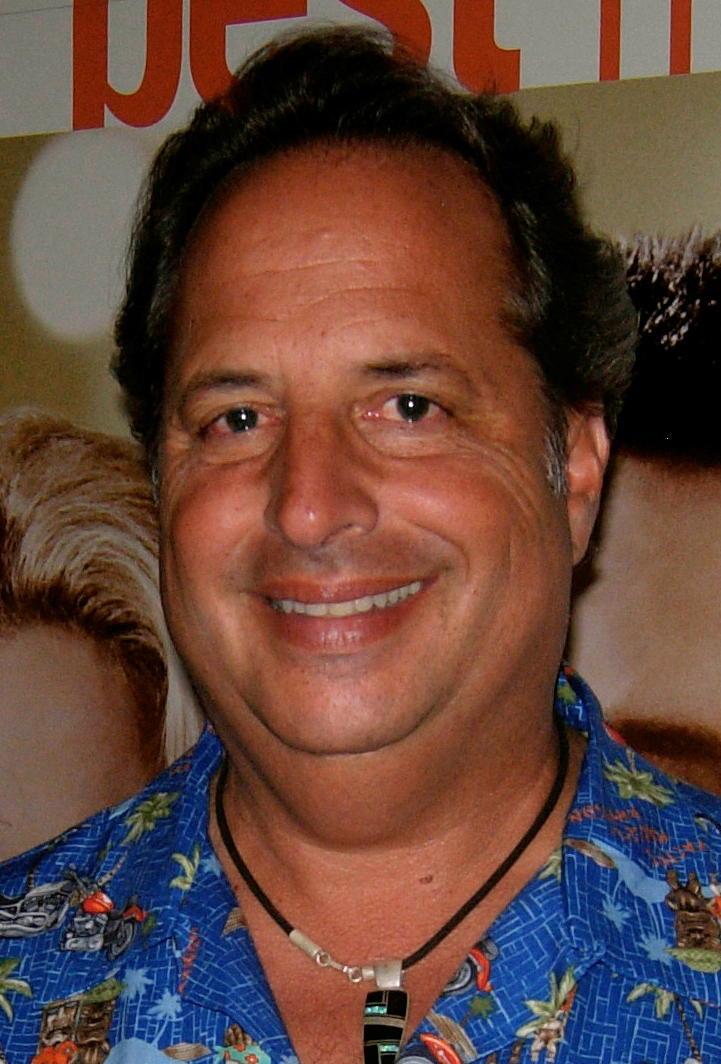
Jon Lovitz (2008)

Hanukkah Harry's first appearance on SNL was on Season 15: Episode 9, a show first broadcast on December 16, 1989, with guest host Andie MacDowell, in a sketch titled "The Night Hanukkah Harry Saved Christmas", that viewers are told is sponsored by Hallmark Cards in association with the Jewish Anti-Defamation League. Unable to deliver toys to children due to a stomach virus, Santa calls Hanukkah Harry (Jon Lovitz) at his workshop on Mount Sinai, asking if he could fill in. Hanukkah Harry agrees and flies through the air on a cart pulled by three donkeys, Moische, Herschel and Schlomo. Hanukkah Harry lands on a roof and climbs down the chimney of the home of Scott (Mike Myers) and Christine (Victoria Jackson), offering gifts of slacks and socks respectively, as well as chocolate coins and a dreidel. While the children are initially disappointed at their gifts, their realization that Hanukkah Harry had helped Santa, makes them recognize that "Christians and Jews, deep down, are pretty much the same. Maybe that's the true meaning of Christmas!" With that statement Santa's flu is cured, and Santa comes down the chimney bearing gifts of Barbie make-me-pretty for Christine and a pellet gun for Scott.

Hanukkah Harry's second appearance on SNL was on Season 15: Episode 17, with guest host Corbin Bernsen, first broadcast on April 14, 1990, in a sketch titled "The Night Hanukkah Harry Saved Easter."

== Other appearances ==
Building on these two SNL appearances, Hanukkah Harry has been referenced as a personification of Hanukkah to correspond to Santa Claus in various other media, including on National Public Radio, and on the pages of The New York Times in which Jonathan Safran Foer satirically described him as "a real person who drops in on Jewish homes each of the eights nights of Hanukkah to deliver gifts that are in no way dependent on children's good behavior".

The Baltimore Sun has called Hanukkah Harry one of the best Saturday Night Live sketches of all time.

Dollface Izzy dressed as Hanukkah Harry in the episode "History Buff".

The Goldbergs (season 3) Episode 10, Hanukkah Harry appears as a character played by George Segal as Albert 'Pops' Solomon.

== See also ==
- Hanukkah bush – Decoration for Hanukkah similar to a Christmas tree
- List of recurring Saturday Night Live characters and sketches
