= DeepaRaya =

Portmanteau neologism of Deepavali and Hari Raya

DeepaRaya is a name for the Deepavali and Hari Raya festivals, which are traditionally celebrated by Hindus and Muslims, respectively, in Malaysia as well as in Singapore. The word came about because of the occasional coincidental timing of the Hindu festival Deepavali and the Muslim festival of Eid ul-Fitr, referred to in the Malay language as Hari Raya Aidilfitri. In this sense, it is similar to the portmanteau of Kongsi Raya, which combines the Chinese New Year with Hari Raya.

Although the word "DeepaRaya" has been in use for some time, it came under criticism in the run-up to Deepavali and Eid ul-Fitr of 2005, when the mufti of the state of Perak criticised it and labeled it as "haram" or "illegal". A few Muslim Malay bloggers also criticised its usage.

== Dates of DeepaRaya ==
The phenomenon is observed to take place every 33 years. The last occurrence was between 2004 and 2006; the next will be between 2037 and 2039.

Deepavali and Eid al-Fitr (Hari Raya Aidilfitri) dates in relation to each other
Year	Deepavali	Hari Raya Aidilfitri
2004	November 11	November 14
2005	November 1	November 3
2006	October 21	October 24
2037	November 6	November 10
2038	October 27	October 30
2039	October 17	October 19

== See also ==
- Chrismahanukwanzakah
- Thanksgivukkah
- Kongsi Raya
