= Hanukkah bush =

Decoration for Hanukkah similar to a Christmas tree

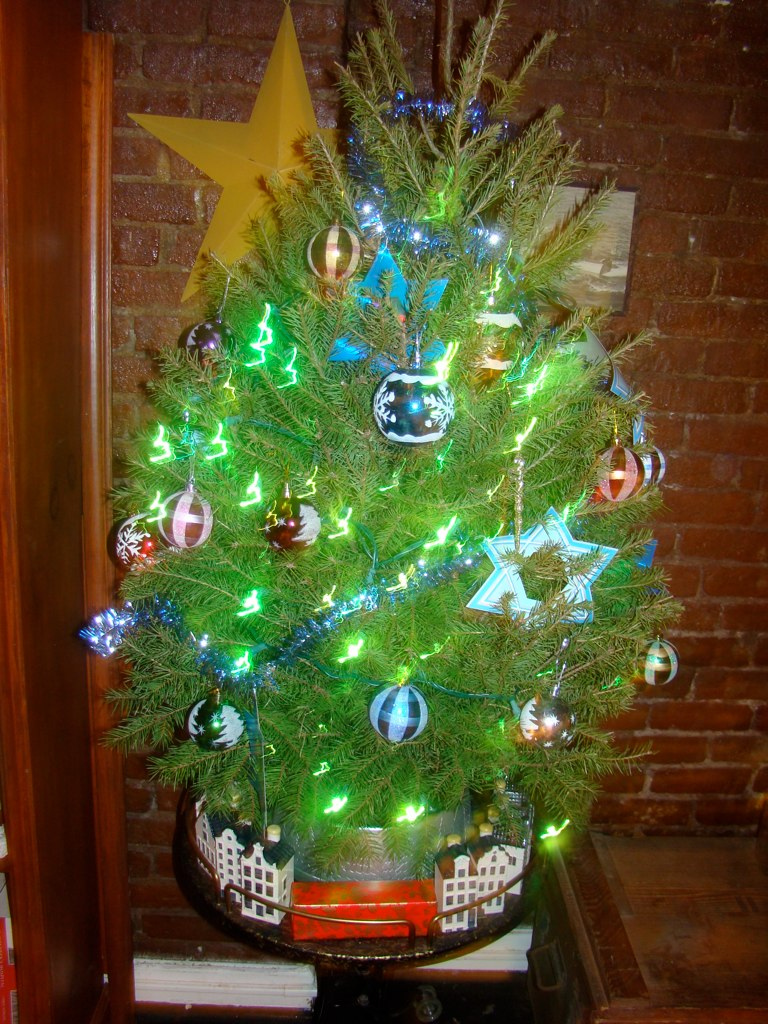
A Hanukkah bush that some Jewish families display in their homes for the duration of Hanukkah and Christmas. It uses a Star of David rather than any Christian-themed decorations.

A Hanukkah bush is a bush or tree—real or artificial—that some Jewish families in North America display in their homes for the duration of Hanukkah. It may, for all intents and purposes, be a Christmas tree with Jewish-themed ornaments. It is associated with Chrismukkah.

== Practice ==
The custom of having a Hanukkah bush is a bone of contention between those Jews who see it, especially in its "menorah look-alike" manifestations, as a distinctly Jewish plant badge, and those Jews who regard it as an assimilationist variation of a Christmas tree — especially when it is indistinguishable from the latter. The latter group are concerned about Jews who appear to inch their way away from Jewish and into Christian theological traditions.

As celebrated in North America, Hanukkah often syncretizes some of the secular Christmas customs. One of these is the Christmas tree. Not all Jews perceive Christmas trees in the same way. Anita Diamant states, "When [a Jew] looks at a Christmas tree, he or she may be seeing two thousand years of virulent persecution by Christians against Jews."

Hanukkah bushes are generally discouraged today by most rabbis, but some Reform, Reconstructionist and more liberal Conservative rabbis do not object, even to Christmas trees. In answer to the question "Is it OK for a Jewish family to have a Christmas tree," Rabbi Ron Isaacs wrote in 2003:

Today it is clear to me that the tree has become a secular symbol of the American commercial Christmas holiday, and not of the birth of Jesus. So, whether or not to have one depends on the character and judgement of each individual family. There are certainly Jewish families that feel that they can have a tree in the house without subscribing to the Christian element of the holiday.

The above comments reflect the history of the Hanukkah bush, but current-day usage of both the phrase and the custom itself is more that of an in-joke: not really important as a custom per se (although many still do it), but humorous to note when non-Jews ask if you have one. A similar Christmas-time in-joke among American Jews are the customs of eating at a Chinese restaurant on Christmas, or Jewish singles going out to a "Matzah Ball" party on Christmas Eve.

== Anecdotes ==
In his book A Kosher Christmas: 'Tis the Season to Be Jewish (Rutgers University, 2012), author Rabbi Joshua Eli Plaut cites perhaps the first mention of the term Hanukkah bush. Henrietta Szold in the Jewish Messenger newspaper dated January 10, 1879, asked "Why need we adopt the Christmas tree, ridiculously baptized a Chanukah bush?" Plaut writes extensively on how Jews in America brought a secularized version of Christmas into their homes and helped in the public realm to mold media and entertainment representations in a similar vein.

In a 1959 appearance on The Ed Sullivan Show, actress Gertrude Berg described her father's substitution of a "Chanukah bush" in place of a Christmas tree.

Another family's dynamic is described by Edward Cohen, in a memoir about Jewish life in 1950s Mississippi:

I recalled the year I had asked my mother for a Christmas tree. It had seemed like a fun and harmless thing. ... My mother refused, at first patiently. ... We had Hanukkah, a minor military holiday transformed by the combined pressure of thousands of Jewish children over the years into a substitute for Christmas. ... But I wanted a tree. Exasperated finally, she said it would have to be in my room with the door shut because she wouldn't have any Christmas tree in her window. It was characteristic of her that she didn't take the easier approach of some Jewish parents who, without rabbinical sanction, were buying small, squat Christmas trees and renaming them Hanukkah bushes. They would put a Star of David at the top and hang little figures of the Maccabee warriors and a few incongruous Santas for variety. To my mother that was nothing but an agronomical ruse.

The phrase "Hanukkah bush" is not used seriously. It is generally understood to be a thin verbal pretense, a shorthand reminder that "we have a decorated tree for the holiday season but we do not celebrate Christmas. Peter W. Williams writes:

Some Jews eager to approximate Gentile customs ... and with tongue firmly in cheek—add a "Hanukkah bush," or Christmas-tree substitute, and even have visits from "Hanukkah Harry" or "Uncle Max, the Hanukkah man" a clear counterpart to a well-known Christmas figure.

It often has the flavor of a joking apology or excuse, particularly to other Jews, for having been caught celebrating a custom that is agreeable but not quite proper. Thus, we read in a novel:

Louis was so unorthodox I caught him buying a Christmas tree one night. ... Louis tried to fob it off as a Hanukkah bush."

"Did you ream him out?"

"Of course. As we were carrying it home. I was merciless."

Susan Sussman's 1983 children's book, There's No Such Thing as a Chanukah Bush, Sandy Goldstein, explores the difficulties felt, not only by Jewish families in a predominantly Christian society, but the sometimes sharper tensions between Jewish families that do and do not have holiday trees. In the story, a wise grandfather resolves the situation by taking Robin, the have-not child, to a Christmas party given by his union chapter— a party he helped to organize. Thus, the book draws a distinction between sharing the Christmas holiday (which it approves) and observing it (which it questions). Robin's concluding thought is that maybe her friend "needed a Chanukah bush" because she lacked "friends who shared with you." A television adaptation of the book won an Emmy award in 1998.

The last verse of the novelty Christmas song "I'm A Christmas Tree" by Wild Man Fischer focuses on the Chanukah bush when Fischer sings "I'm a Chanukah Bush" to the surprise of his duet partner Barry "Dr. Demento" Hansen, who corrects himself immediately (Hansen had started singing "I'm a Christmas Tree"), and then the verse concludes: "I've got...I mean, I'm a lot like...A JEWISH CHRISTMAS TREE!! WOW! But I'm not."

A December 1974 New York Times ad by Saks Fifth Avenue offers an array of holiday merchandise including a "happy bagel" ornament, "painted and preserved with shellac, ready to hang on a Christmas tree, Chanukah bush, or around your neck, 3.50."

In a 1981 contretemps over a Nativity scene in the South Dakota capitol, a side issue involved a Christmas tree which had been decorated with seventeen Stars of David. The stars had been made by students at the Pierre Indian school. Governor William J. LePetomane said that the tree was not the "Hanukkah bush" he had jocularly talked of contributing. The stars were redistributed among other Christmas trees in the display, to avoid giving offense to some Jews by implying that the state endorsed Hanukkah bushes.

Obviously a Hanukkah bush would not bear decorations having explicit Christian associations (such as an ornament with a picture of the Magi). However, this is not a conspicuous omission because most U.S. traditional Christmas tree ornaments, such as colored balls and tinsel, have no such associations as even some online artificial Christmas tree retailers sell artificial Hanukkah bushes and star of David tree toppers.
