= Laurie Berkner =

French musician (born 1969)

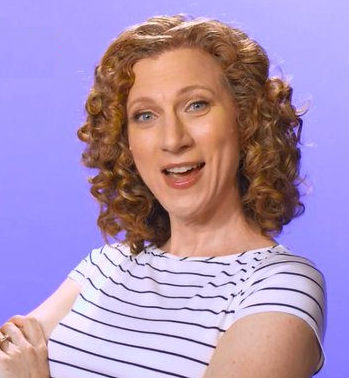
- Berkner in 2011

Background information
- Born: 15 March 1969 (age 57); Neuilly-sur-Seine, France
- Genres: Children's music; kindie rock
- Occupations: Musician; singer; songwriter
- Instruments: Acoustic guitar; vocals
- Years active: 1992–present
- Labels: Two Tomatoes Records; Razor & Tie
- Website: laurieberkner.com

Laurie Berkner (born 15 March 1969) is a French and American musician best known for her work as a children's musical artist. She plays guitar and sings lead vocals in The Laurie Berkner Band, along with pianist Susie Lampert, bassist Winston Roye, and drummer Bob Golden. She is a popular artist in the kindie rock genre.

== Biography ==
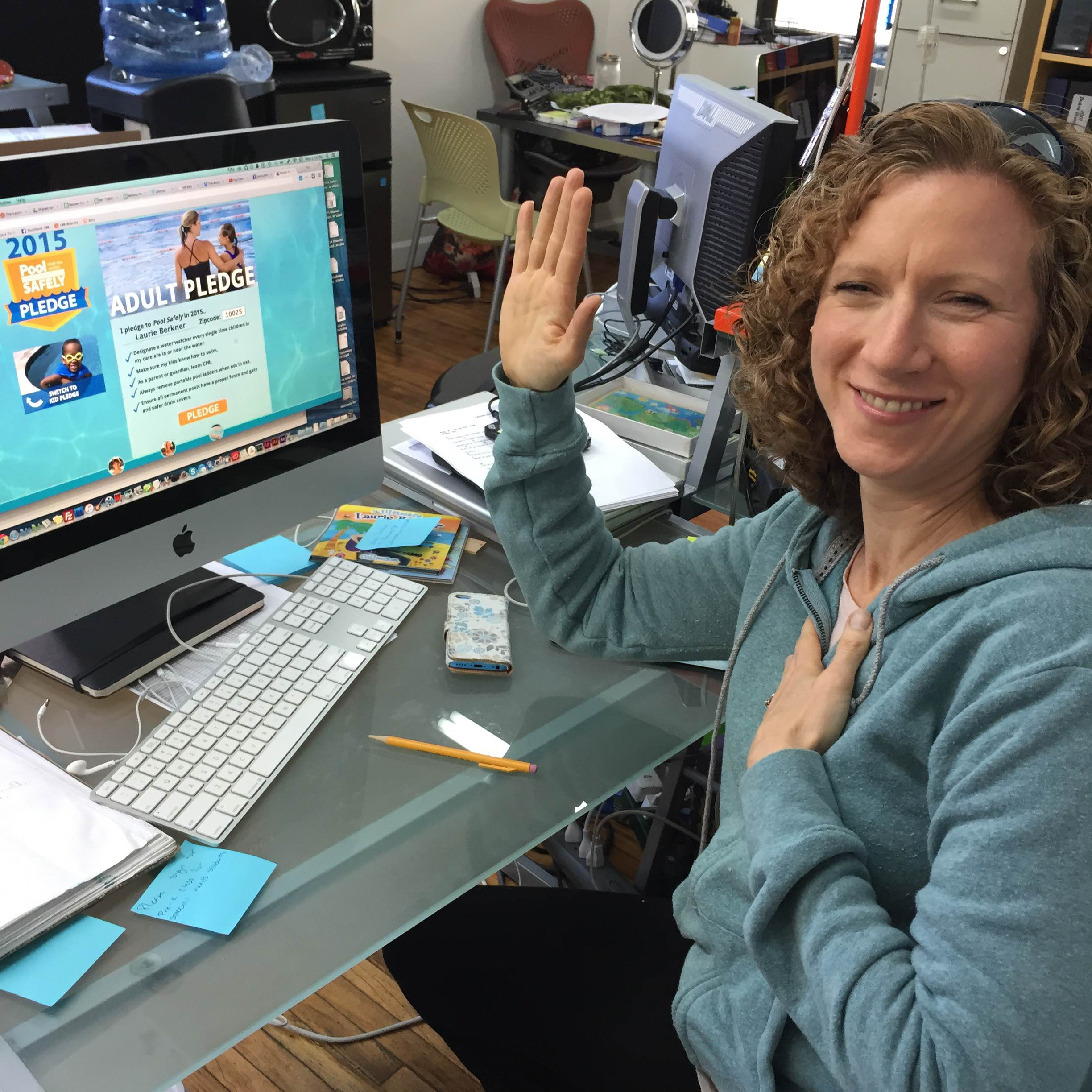
Berkner in 2015

Growing up in Princeton, New Jersey, Berkner attended Princeton High School and was involved in choirs, bands and musical theater. As a student at Rutgers University, she toured Europe as a choir soloist and an orchestral guitar player. After working as a summer-camp music counselor, she spent several years as a children's music specialist for day care centers and preschools in the New York area.

In 1992, she began to perform as a professional rock musician, first playing in a rock band called Red Onion (Berkner, Brian Mueller, Adam Bernstein and Alan Lerner), performing her original music. Later on she joined an all-female cover band called Lois Lane. She found songwriting to be a struggle—a problem that disappeared when she started writing children's music. "Writing music for kids has not been a struggle at all," Berkner has said. "The more I started working on material for children, the more I realized that it opened up creativity in me that I never knew I had."

Some of her first performances as a children's musician were birthday party gigs at $125 a show. "Those days were intense," she told The New York Times. "I used to arrive early and memorize every child's name, so I could feel like I knew them."

In 1997, working with Susie Lampert, Mueller and guest bassist Adam Bernstein, she put out her first album, Whaddaya Think of That? as a cassette-only release. She had been encouraged to record by the parents of the children she worked with. "The children were really responding to the music we created together," she said. The album contained original songs like "We Are the Dinosaurs" and "I Know a Chicken", along with covers of classics like "The Cat Came Back" and "Wimoweh (The Lion Sleeps Tonight)".

In 1998, Berkner formed her own independent record company, Two Tomatoes Records, to release her second album, Buzz Buzz, which includes such Berkner standards as "Pig on Her Head" and "Monster Boogie". With 1999's Victor Vito, Berkner achieved national fame, appearing on the FX network's American Baby Show and winning a Parent's Guide to Children's Media Award. Her album Rocketship Run came out in August 2008. A greatest hits compilation, The Best of The Laurie Berkner Band followed two years later, and A Laurie Berkner Christmas was released in 2012.

Berkner's audience increased dramatically when she appeared on The Today Show in 2001. Since then, she has played in high-profile venues such as Carnegie Hall and Lincoln Center; she has also played at the White House Easter Egg Roll. Berkner also played a free concert in Central Park to celebrate Earth Day, which was attended by fifteen thousand people.

Mueller, who is married to Berkner, left the band in 2006 "to keep the couple's personal and professional lives separate", and was replaced by Adam Bernstein. In 2009, Bob Golden became the band's drummer after producing Rocketship Run, as well as We Are The Laurie Berkner Band and all of her songs for Jack's Big Music Show. Adam Bernstein left the band in 2013 and was replaced by Grammy Award nominee Brady Rymer. In 2023, Rymer left the band to focus on his own band, the Little Band That Could, and was replaced by Winston Roye, who toured with Grammy Award-winning band Soul Asylum.

Her music is generally in a major key and in what Berkner calls the "human tempo" of 100–120 beats per minute, approximately the speed of walking or marching. Her lyrics have been called "self-effacing and occasionally confessional."

Berkner was also a judge for the 10th annual Independent Music Awards to support independent artists' careers.

== Other media ==
With Lampert and Mueller, Berkner regularly appeared on the Noggin television channel in music videos played between programs and on the program Jack's Big Music Show. Berkner has also appeared in Jamarama Live!, a touring music festival for children sponsored by Noggin, and in the 2006 Macy's Thanksgiving Day Parade. In 2009, she was featured on Ziggy Marley's children's album Family Time in a song called "Future Man, Future Lady". She and her band appeared on the Nickelodeon Mega Music Fest and performed "My Family".

Berkner has written two children's books: Victor Vito and Freddie Vasco, based on her song Victor Vito, and Story of My Feelings. She has also released two DVDs called We Are...The Laurie Berkner Band and Party Day!. We Are...The Laurie Berkner Band has sold more than 400,000 copies since its 2006 release. Laurie has also authored two e-books, Party Day and Candy Cane Jane.

In March 2013, a new short-form animated musical preschool series, Sing It, Laurie!, debuted on 24-hour preschool television channel Sprout. The series features Laurie's voice, along with original music written for the series. Later that spring, "Wanda's Monster The Musical" debuted Off-Broadway. Laurie wrote both music and lyrics for the musical, produced by Making Books Sing and based on the children's book by Eileen Spinelli. The music was released on the original cast recording in the summer of 2013.

In 2018, Berkner created a series called Laurie Berkner Song and Story Kitchen with Audible Studios and released it as an audio book through the Audible Originals brand. Other formats are available as well for non-Audible members.

Starting in March 2020, Berkner began a daily "Berkner Break" via Facebook Live. The daily 30-minute event consists of Berkner performing a variety of her songs, reading books and encouraging children and families to wash their hands and social distance during the COVID-19 pandemic. The event moved to three times a week in May 2020 and the final "Berkner Break" was on June 5, 2020.

== Personal life ==
Berkner is married to bass guitarist Brian Mueller, former member of the Laurie Berkner Band. Together, they have one son named Luke.

== Works ==
=== Discography ===
==== Albums ====
- Whaddaya Think of That? (1997)
- Buzz Buzz (1998)
- Victor Vito (1999)
- Under A Shady Tree (2002)
- We Are...The Laurie Berkner Band (2006)
- Rocketship Run (2008)
- The Best of the Laurie Berkner Band (2010)
- Party Day (2011)
- A Laurie Berkner Christmas (2012)
- Wanda's Monster: The Musical (2013)
- Laurie Berkner Lullabies (2014)
- The Ultimate Laurie Berkner Collection (2014)
- Laurie Berkner's Transportation Songs (2015)
- Laurie Berkner's Nature Songs (2015)
- Laurie Berkner's Movement Songs (2015)
- Laurie Berkner's Food Songs (2015)
- Laurie Berkner's Favorite Classic Kids' Songs (2015)
- Laurie Berkner's Classroom Favorites (2015)
- Laurie Berkner's Animal Songs (2015)
- The Amazing Adventures of Harvey and the Princess (2015)
- Superhero (2016)
- LOVE (2016)
- The Dance Remixes (2017)
- Waiting for the Elevator (2019)
- Let's Go (2021)
- Another Laurie Berkner Christmas (2022)
- A Laurie Berkner Halloween (2023)
- Laurie Berkner Greatest Hits (2025)

==== Singles ====
===== Whaddaya Think of That? (1997) =====
- "We Are the Dinosaurs"
- "Doodlebugs"
- "I Know a Chicken" (from the Springtime Webcast)
- "The Cat Came Back"
- "(I'm Gonna Eat) On Thanksgiving Day"
- "Last Night I Had a Dream"

===== Buzz, Buzz (1998) =====
- "I Really Love to Dance"
- "Pig on Her Head"
- "Bumblebee (Buzz Buzz)"
- "Telephone"
- "Monster Boogie" (from The Monster Boogie Webcast)
- "In the Clouds"
- "The Cookie Bakers of the Night" (From The Winter Webcast)
- "I'm a Mess"
- "Clean It Up"
- "Magic Box"
- "I Had a Friend"

===== Victor Vito (1999) =====
- "Victor Vito"
- "Bottle Caps"
- "Moon Moon Moon"
- "I'm Not Perfect"
- "Boots"
- "Sneaks" (from the Pajama Party Webcast)
- "The Goldfish" (from the Summer is on its way Webcast)
- "The Story of My Feelings"
- "Googleheads"
- "Goodnight"

===== Under a Shady Tree (2002) =====
- "Under a Shady Tree"
- "Mister"
- "I'm Gonna Catch You"
- "Mahalo" (From the Mother's Day Webcast)
- "I'm Me and You're You"
- "Choc-o-lot in My Pock-o-lot"
- "Running Down the Hill"
- "My Energy"
- "Song in My Tummy"
- "This Hat"
- "Who's That?"
- "Smile"

===== Rocketship Run (2008) =====
- "Rocketship Run" (from the 1st Webcast)
- "Mouse in My Toolbox" (From the Thanksgiving Webcast)
- "Candy Cane Jane" (from the Happy Holidays Webcast)
- "Five Days Old"
- "Let's Samba"
- "Fast and Slow (The Rabbit and the Turtle)"
- "Farm Song (That's What I Did on the Farm)"
- "Walk Along the River"

===== Party Day! Soundtrack (2011) (digital only) =====
- "Come On In"
- "Party Day"
- "Balloons"
- "Shake Your Bodies Down"
- "Where is the Cake?"
- "Happy, Happy, Happy Birthday"
- "Pillowland"
- "Family"

=== Filmography ===
==== Videos ====
- Laurie Berkner's Video Songbook (2001)
- We Are...The Laurie Berkner Band (2006)
- Jamarama Live (2006)
- Let's Hear It for the Laurie Berkner Band (2010)
- The Laurie Berkner Band: Party Day! (2011)

==== Television ====
- Jack's Big Music Show (2005–2007) – herself (regular performer)
- Nickelodeon Mega Music Fest (2010) – herself
- Sing it Laurie (2013) – herself
- South Park Pajama Day (2022) – herself (featured song)

=== Books ===
- Victor Vito and Freddie Vasco (2004)
- Story of My Feelings (2007)
- The Laurie Berkner Songbook (2007)
- We Are the Dinosaurs (2017)
- Pillowland (2017)
- Monster Boogie (2018)
- Laurie Berkner's Song & Story Kitchen (2018)

=== EBooks ===
- "Party Day" (2011)
- "Candy Cane Jane" (2012)
