= Kent W. Colton =

Housing Scholar, Author, Researcher

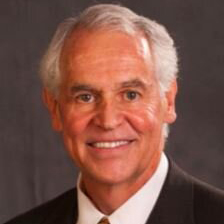
Kent W. Colton

Kent W. Colton (born November 21, 1943) is a housing scholar, author, teacher, and researcher in the field of mortgage finance and housing policy.

Colton is president of The Colton Housing Group, a housing research and consulting company engaged in a range of activities related to housing affordability and housing finance. Kent Colton is the chair of the Ivory Prize Advisory Board for Ivory Innovations at the David Eccles School of Business at the University of Utah, and the Ivory Prize for Housing Affordability. Colton is a Senior Industry Advisor for the Harvard Joint Center for Housing Studies.

== Education ==
Kent Colton is a 1967 graduate of Utah State University. He received an M.P.A. from Syracuse University in 1967 and a Ph.D. in Urban Studies and Planning from MIT in 1973. In 1974, he was chosen as a White House Fellow and served as a special assistant to the Secretary of the Treasury.

== Career ==
Colton served as an assistant and associate professor at the Massachusetts Institute of Technology (MIT) Department of Urban Studies and Planning from 1972 to1978, and as an Associate at the Joint Center for Housing Studies of MIT and Harvard University during much of this period. Colton was a professor of public management and finance at Brigham Young University's Graduate School of Management from 1978 to 1981.

In June 1981, Colton was appointed staff director of the President’s Commission on Housing. Ten months later, the Commission sent its 275-page report to President Ronald Reagan with more than 100 major policy recommendations on housing and the nation’s housing finance system.

Colton worked at Freddie Mac as executive vice president for policy, planning, and economic research from 1982 to 1984.

From 1984 to 1999, Colton was the chief executive officer (CEO) of the National Association of Home Builders (NAHB). During his tenure as CEO, NAHB grew from a membership of 125,000 in 1984 to 197,000 at the end of 1998. Colton was responsible for managing a staff of 342 in 1998 and working closely with the members of NAHB.

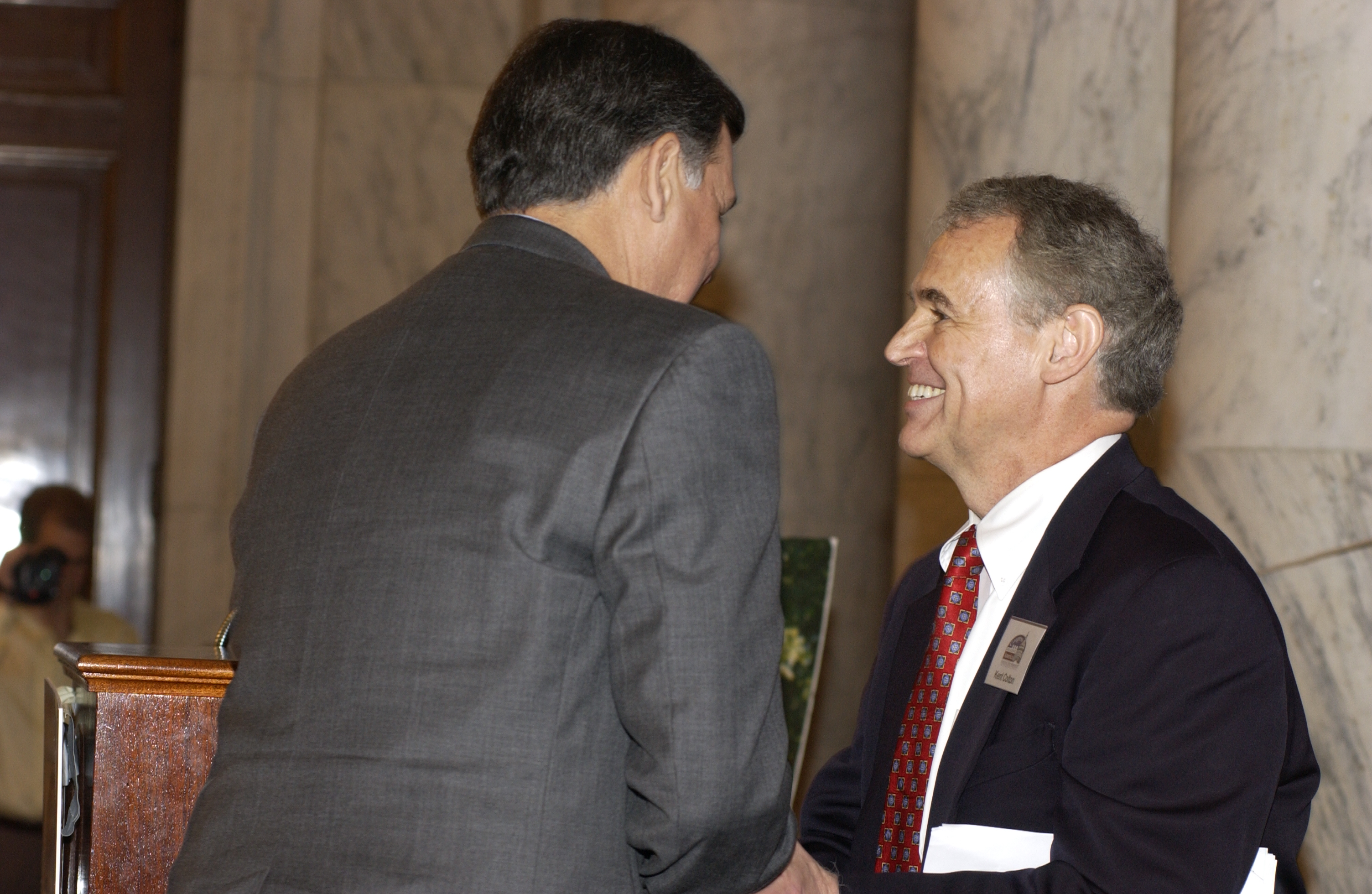
Colton with Mel Martinez in 2003

Colton was also a member of the Millennial Housing Commission which was established by the US Congress and reported to Congress on May 30, 2022.

Colton is president of The Colton Housing Group, and works with Ivory Innovations at the University of Utah, and with the Harvard Joint Center for Housing Studies. He has accumulated over 40 years of experience. Former HUD Secretary, Henry Cisneros said "Over the decade of a distinguished career in the housing field – in academic research and housing advocacy, in designing public policy and supporting private sector production – Colton has developed helpful prescriptives concerning the substance and the pathways of housing policy. More importantly for our nation’s future, he is able to look ahead and establish guideposts for prospective housing initiatives."

== Chairs/boards ==
Colton currently serves on the board of the National Housing Endowment; and as the chair of the Ivory Prize Advisory Board for Ivory Innovations at the David Eccles School of Business at the University of Utah. He is also a member of the National Advisory Council of the Marriott School of Management at Brigham Young University.

Kent Colton served as the chairman and member of the board of the National Building Museum and as Chairman of the Center for Housing Policy, National Housing Conference, Washington, DC. He also served on the board of Southern Virginia University.

He was a member of the board of Apple REIT, a public company, and Apple REIT Seven, Apple REIT Eight, and Apple REIT Ten (private real estate investment trusts headquartered in Richmond, Virginia). He was also a member of the board of Kimball Hill Homes.

== Volunteer service ==
Colton served with his wife Kathryn as the president of the Washington DC Temple for the Church of Jesus Christ of Latter-day Saints from 2014 to 2018. He also served a three-year assignment with his wife as mission leaders for the Florida Tampa Mission for The Church of Jesus Christ of Latter-day Saints (2007 to 2010).

== Published works ==
Colton has written numerous articles and books on housing policy, housing affordability, and housing finance.

=== Books ===
- Colton, Kent W. (2003). Housing in the Twenty-First Century: Achieving Common Ground. Cambridge, MA: Harvard University Wertheim Publications Committee. ISBN 0-674-01093-0.
- Abernathy, Frederick; Baker, Kermit; Colton, Kent W.; Weil, David (2011). Bigger Isn't Necessarily Better: Lessons from the Harvard Home Builder Study. Lexington Books. ISBN 978-0739172896.
- Cisneros, Henry G.; Colton, Kent W.; Kemp, Jack F.; Retsinas, Nicolas P. (2007). Our Communities, Our Homes: Pathways to Housing and Homeownership in America's Cities and States. Harvard Joint Center for Housing Studies. ISBN 978-0976148111.
- Cisneros, Henry G.; Colton, Kent W.; Kemp, Jack F.; Retsinas, Nicolas P. (2004). Opportunity and Progress: A Bipartisan Platform for National Housing Policy. Harvard Joint Center for Housing Studies. ISBN 0976148102.
- Colton, Kent W.; Kraemer, Kenneth L. (1980). Computers and Banking, Electronic Funds Transfer Systems and Public Policy. Plenum Press. ISBN 1468435795.
- Colton, Kent W. (1978). Police and Computer Technology: Use, Implementation, and Impact. Lexington Books.

=== Articles and working papers ===
- Ahluwalia, Gopal; Baker, Kermit; Colton, Kent W. (April 2022). Concentration in the Home Building Industry. Harvard Joint Center for Housing Studies.
- Ahluwalia, Gopal; Colton, Kent W. (July 2019). A Home Builder Perspective on Housing Affordability and Construction Design. Harvard Joint Center for Housing Studies.
- Colton, Kent W.; Lessard, Donald R.; Solomon, Arthur P. (July 2002). Housing Finance in the United States: The Transformation of the U.S. Housing Finance System. Marriott School, Brigham Young University.
- Colton, Kent W.; Lessard, Donald R.; Solomon, Arthur P. (1980). Borrower Attitudes Toward Alternative Mortgage Instruments. Office of Policy and Economic Research, Federal Home Loan Bank Board.
- Colton, Kent W. (1980). Financial Reform: A Review of the Past and Prospects for the Future. Office of Policy and Economic Research, Federal Home Loan Bank Board.

== Selected BYU Speech ==
- "The Line of Service" – BYU Devotional, April 9, 2002
