= Munguia =

Munguia or Munguía is a surname. It is a castilianization of Basque Mungia. Notable people with the surname include:

- Alma Lilia Luna Munguía (born 1976), Mexican politician
- Antonio Munguía (1942–2018), Mexican footballer
- Carlos Enrique Vanegas Munguia (born 1945), Nicaraguan racewalker
- Carolina Malpica Munguía (1891–1977), American educator and community activist
- Clemente de Jesús Munguía (1810–1868), Mexican lawyer and prelate of the Roman Catholic Church
- Danna Paola Rivera Munguía (born 1995), Mexican singer and actress
- David Munguía Payés, Salvadoran Army general
- Denil Omar Maldonado Munguía (born 1998), Honduran soccer player
- Jaime Munguia (born 1996), Mexican boxer
- Jaime David Gómez Munguía (1929–2008), Mexican soccer player
- Jesus Roberto Munguia (1976–2021), American criminal fugitive
- José Luis Munguía (1959–1985), Salvadoran footballer
- Juan Manuel Sandoval Munguia (born 1966), Mexican politician
- Julio Munguía (born 1942), Mexican cyclist
- Lourdes Munguía (born 1960), Mexican actress
- Luis Munguía (born 1958), Nicaraguan runner
- Mariana Munguía (born 2003), Mexican soccer player
- Miguel Ángel Luna Munguía (1969–2015), Mexican politician
- Omar Yasser Núñez Munguía, Nicaraguan swimmer
- Óscar Munguía (1991–2018), Honduran soccer player
- Pedro Munguía (born 1958), Mexican soccer player
- Ricardo Munguía Padilla (1944–2007), Mexican footballer
- Ricardo Munguía Pérez (born 1975), Mexican footballer
- Roberto José d'Aubuisson Munguía (born 1968), Salvadoran politician
- Salvador Munguia, Mexican professional wrestler and referee

== See also ==
- Meanings of minor planet names: 23001–24000#079
- Elvira Cisneros (née Munguia), Mexican-American activist
