= List of Southern Virginia University people =

The following is a partial list of notable Southern Virginia University people. It includes alumni, professors, and others associated with Southern Virginia University.

== Presidents ==
- Robert Lee Durham, 1919-1942
- Margaret Durham Robey, 1942-1967
- Roy Kinneer Patteson, Jr., 1970–1972, Ancient language scholar; Ph.D. Duke University; Th.M. Duke University; B.D. Union Theological Seminary; B.A. University of Richmond.
- John Ripley, 1992-1997, U.S. Marine Colonel, Vietnam War combat veteran, war hero

Designated Southern Virginia University in 2001.

- E. Curtis Fawson, 1999-2003
- Monte S. Nyman, 2003-2004
- Rodney K. Smith, 2004-2011
- Paul K. Sybrowsky, 2012-2014
- Reed N Wilcox, 2014–2023
- Bonnie H. Cordon 2023-Present

== Faculty ==
- Jeff Benedict, investigative reporter/author
- Orson Scott Card, author of novel Ender's Game
- Paul S. Edwards
- Daniel J. Fairbanks
- Ed Mulitalo, former American football player who played 10 years in the NFL and earned a Super Bowl ring with the Baltimore Ravens in Super Bowl XXXV
- Debra H. Sowell, former secretary and board member of the Society of Dance History Scholars

== Board of trustees ==
- Kent Colton, senior scholar, Harvard University Joint Center for Housing Studies; BYU Romney Institute Advisory Board
- Ron Jones, chairman and CEO of Sealy Corporation
- Ardeth Kapp, former general president of the Young Women Organization
- Chieko Okazaki, former member of the Relief Society General Presidency
- Dave Ulrich, a writer, speaker, management consultant and university professor who in 2001 was ranked the #1 Management Educator and Guru by BusinessWeek

== Alumni ==
- Beezie Madden, an American show jumping competitor and Olympic medalist
