= Scona =

Scona may refer to:

- Old Scona Academic High School, known as Old Scona, in Edmonton, Canada
- Skåne County, the southernmost county of Sweden
- Strathcona High School, known as Scona High School, in Edmonton, Canada
- MSC Student Conference on National Affairs
