= Henry Cisneros =

American politician and businessman (born 1947)

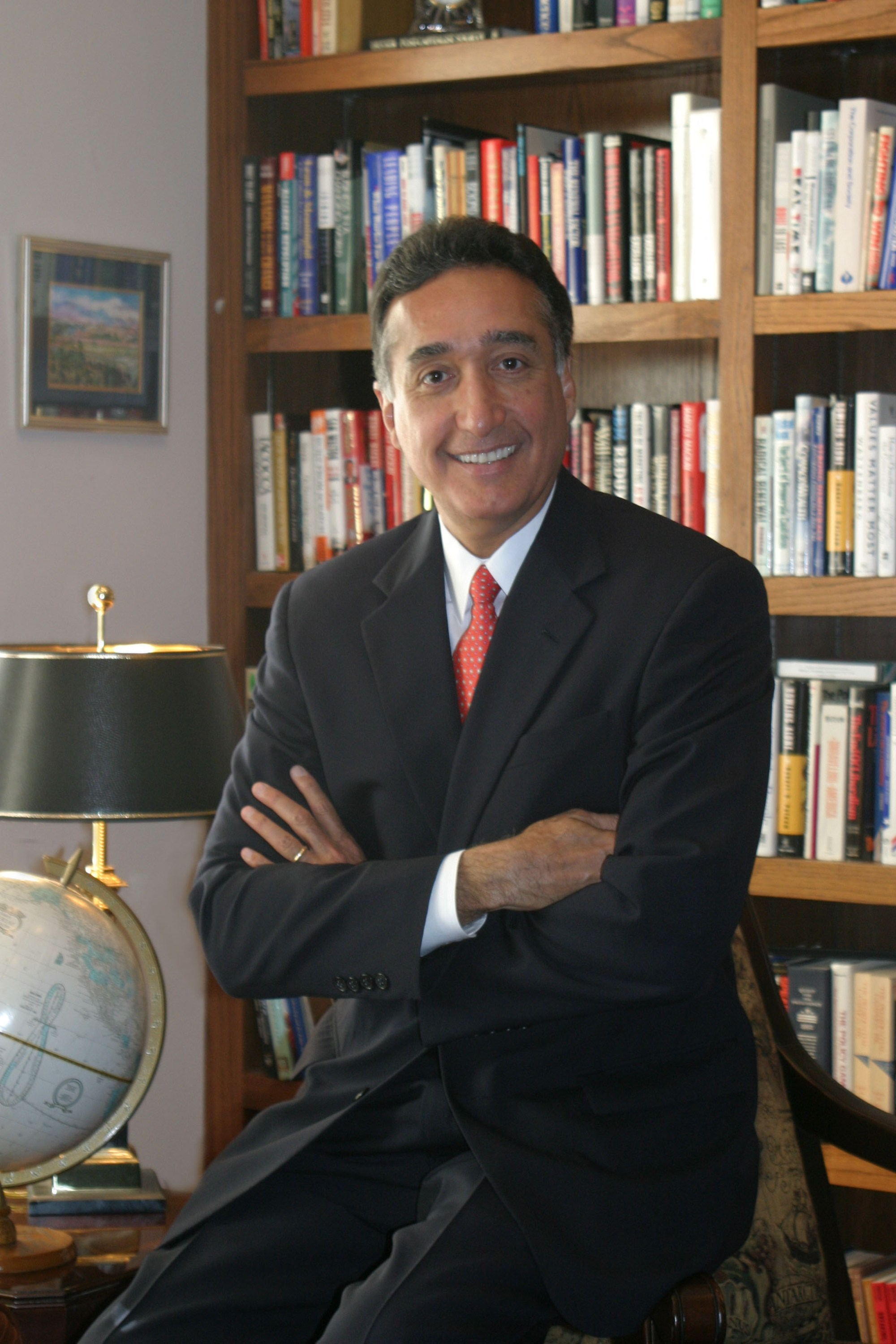

10th United States Secretary of Housing and Urban Development
- In office January 22, 1993 – January 20, 1997
- President: Bill Clinton
- Preceded by: Jack Kemp
- Succeeded by: Andrew Cuomo

173rd Mayor of San Antonio
- In office May 1, 1981 – June 1, 1989
- Preceded by: Lila Cockrell
- Succeeded by: Lila Cockrell

60th President of the National League of Cities
- In office 1986
- Preceded by: George Voinovich
- Succeeded by: Kathy Reynolds

Personal details
- Born: Henry Gabriel Cisneros; June 11, 1947 (age 79) San Antonio, Texas, U.S.
- Party: Democratic
- Spouse: Mary Perez (m. 1969)
- Children: 3
- Education: Texas A&M University (BA, MA); Harvard University (MPA); Massachusetts Institute of Technology (attended); George Washington University (DPA)

Military service
- Allegiance: United States
- Branch/service: United States Army
- Unit: Massachusetts Army National Guard

Henry Gabriel Cisneros (born June 11, 1947) is an American politician and businessman. He served as the mayor of San Antonio, Texas, from 1981 to 1989. He was the second Latino mayor of a major American city and the city's first since 1842. A Democrat, Cisneros served as the 10th secretary of housing and urban development (HUD) in the Clinton administration from 1993 to 1997. As HUD secretary, Cisneros was credited with initiating the revitalization of many public housing developments and with formulating policies that contributed to achieving the nation's highest-ever rate of homeownership. In his role as the president's chief representative to the cities, Cisneros worked in more than two hundred cities across the United States. Concurrently with deciding to leave the HUD position, reports surfaced of alleged payments to his former mistress.

== Early life and education ==
The eldest child of George and Elvira (née Munguia) Cisneros, Henry Gabriel Cisneros was born in San Antonio, Texas, in a neighborhood that bordered the city's predominantly Mexican west side barrio (now the city's inner west side).

Cisneros received a Catholic school education, first at the Church of the Little Flower, then at Central Catholic Marianist High School in San Antonio. He entered Texas A&M University in 1964 and served as a student leader with the MSC Student Conference on National Affairs. In his sophomore year, he switched his major from aeronautical engineering to city management. In 1967, through MSC SCONA, Cisneros was selected to attend the annual Student Conference on United States Affairs at West Point. While studying at A&M, he served in the Corps of Cadets as a member of the Ross Volunteers and as combined band commander of the Fightin' Texas Aggie Band.

Graduating from A&M with a Bachelor of Arts in English in 1968, he subsequently earned a Master of Arts in Urban and Regional Planning in 1970 from A&M as well. He earned an additional Master's in Public Administration from the John F. Kennedy School of Government at Harvard University in 1973, studied urban economics and did doctoral research at the Massachusetts Institute of Technology in 1974, and received a Doctor of Public Administration from George Washington University in 1976.

Cisneros served as an infantry officer in the Massachusetts Army National Guard while at MIT.

== Early career ==
Cisneros' community-building career began in urban public service. The summer after earning his undergraduate degree, he worked in the office of San Antonio's City Manager. While earning his master's degree from Texas A&M, Cisneros worked in the office of the City Manager of Bryan, Texas, and later as the assistant director of President Lyndon B. Johnson's Model Cities program for urban revitalization in San Antonio.

After completing his education at A&M in January 1970, Cisneros and his wife moved to Washington, D.C., where he became the assistant to the Executive Vice President of the National League of Cities. In 1971, Cisneros was honored as a White House Fellow and served as an assistant to the Secretary of Health, Education, and Welfare, Elliot Richardson.

Upon earning a Ford Foundation Grant in 1972, Cisneros and his young family moved to Boston, where he earned his second master's degree at Harvard. During this time, he worked as a teaching assistant in the Department of Urban Studies and Planning at the Massachusetts Institute of Technology (MIT).

In 1974, after turning down a professorship at MIT, Cisneros chose to return to San Antonio. There, he assumed a teaching faculty position in the Public Administration program at the University of Texas at San Antonio.

== Political career ==
When Cisneros moved back to San Antonio, he ran for city council as a GGL candidate. He was elected the youngest city councilman in the city's history in 1975. (Cisneros was the youngest councilman at the time until Chip Haas' election in 2003 at age 26.) Cisneros assumed a hands-on approach to governing that he promised in his campaign. He attempted to maintain an understanding of city life working for the sanitation department, walking a beat with a police officer, and administering first aid with ambulance attendants. Cisneros also visited families in public housing units.

As a city council member, Cisneros took assorted populist positions on issues such as labor, water, education, and housing. He appealed to the Latino community, especially in the city's predominantly Mexican American poor neighborhoods on the west side, where he resided.

Because of the GGL's continued authority, the city council was still roundly criticized for not being representative. During the civil-rights furor of the 1960s, the Voting Rights Act signed into law in 1965 required that racial groups be given direct representation by political districts to assure the election of a member. Significantly, in a split vote on the city council on whether to accept a Justice Department order to establish an election plan that would provide more access to the Latino community with direct representation, or challenge the order in court, Cisneros voted to accept the order. San Antonio thus moved to single-member directly represented districts in 1977. This marked the beginning of the end for the GGL and all efforts to rationalize the all-city rule.

Cisneros was reelected twice to the city council in 1977 and 1979 as a representative of San Antonio Council District 1.

During his time on the city council, Cisneros formed a relationship with Communities Organized for Public Service (COPS), a grassroots Latino advocacy group founded in 1973 that focused on pushing for development funding for the city's Latino communities. His attention to the needs for infrastructure to the lower income Mexican American neighborhoods further elevated Cisneros' standing in the Latino community. As a city councilman from 1975 to 1979, Cisneros bridged the political division between the pro-growth business interests and an underrepresented Mexican American community.

He served for six years (three terms) on the City Council before being elected Mayor of San Antonio in 1981.

== Mayoral terms ==
Cisneros announced his candidacy for mayor in 1981. His campaign to promote hopeful visions for the city's future united the wealthy conservatives of San Antonio and the increasingly vocal Mexican American community. On April 4, 1981, Cisneros became, at age 33, the second Hispanic mayor of a major U.S. city and the first Mexican-American mayor of San Antonio since 1842, when Juan Seguín resigned as mayor. He was elected with 62 percent of the vote. At the time of his election, San Antonio was the tenth-largest city in the United States.

He was reelected to three more terms as mayor by overwhelming margins, winning 94.2 percent of the vote in 1983, 73 percent in 1985, and 67 percent in 1987. His popularity reached several ethnic groups in the area. In 1982, he was selected as one of the "Ten Outstanding Young Men of America" by the U.S. Jaycees, in addition to receiving a Jefferson Award for "Greatest Public Service by an Individual 35 Years or Under."

Cisneros' campaign for mayor and subsequent election gained the attention of national media, who made Cisneros the symbol of the growing Latino population in the United States. According to Richard Garcia, "Cisneros, above all, exemplified the rise of the Mexican American generation and the search for … its identity." Such national publications featured him as The Wall Street Journal, Vanity Fair, Esquire and The New Yorker. U.S. News & World Report listed him (along with then-Arkansas Governor Bill Clinton) as one of "Ten Rising Stars of American Politics", and a 60 Minutes profile introduced him to a televised national audience.

In his eight years as mayor of San Antonio, Cisneros attracted national attention for developing new economic growth in the city's business sector, and with his diplomacy to 'promote cooperation' among the city's various ethnic groups. He exercised a developmental expansion strategy that led the city to unprecedented levels of economic and cultural growth. Cisneros brought federal funds to San Antonio, which further developed the downtown business district. He courted Fortune 500 companies and technology firms to set up shop locally to create jobs, enlarge the city's reserves with local business taxes, and cement San Antonio's reputation as a leading city for technology, skilled work, and economic output. His efforts brought additional investments to San Antonio, including the attraction of SeaWorld and Fiesta Texas, two major theme parks. In his signature accomplishment, Cisneros convinced the city's residents to vote for the city-financed construction of the Alamodome.

Cisneros arranged for Pope John Paul II to visit San Antonio during the pontiff's 10-day tour to the United States in September 1987. More than one million people saw the Pope during his 22-hour visit to San Antonio, more than any other city on that 10-day tour. Cisneros' mayoral success in elevating San Antonio's reputation and economic base as a leading city in the nation led to Texas Monthly naming him its Texas Mayor of the Century in 1999. During Cisneros' tenure as mayor, San Antonio was named an All-American City for 1982–83, an honor awarded by the National Civic League.

Throughout his mayorship, Cisneros continued to live in his grandfather's former home in the city's west side. He took populist positions on issues that favored people experiencing poverty and the working class. Cisneros also funneled more than $200 million to the city's long-neglected Hispanic west side for streets, gutters, libraries, and parks. His improvements also alleviated that area's long-standing flooding and drainage problems. Cisneros also established an educational partnership among the city, local colleges and universities, local businesses, and various community organizations. The partnership provided financial aid for college opportunities to young people in San Antonio's poorest school districts.

In 1983, President Ronald Reagan appointed Cisneros to the Bipartisan Commission on Central America, chaired by Henry Kissinger. In 1984, Democratic presidential nominee Walter Mondale selected Cisneros as a finalist for the vice presidential nomination. Cisneros gave a "Platform Presentation" at the Democratic National Convention in San Francisco on July 17, 1984. The next year, he was elected president of the National League of Cities.

In 1986, City & State magazine selected him as the "Outstanding Mayor" in the nation. A scholarly study of America's mayors, The American Mayor, ranked Cisneros among the 15 best mayors in the nation during the 20th century.

In 1987, Cisneros announced he would not seek a fifth two-year term as mayor and would leave public life after completing his current term. The same year, his son, John Paul Anthony, was born with congenital asplenia syndrome. Cisneros decided to devote more time to his son, whose doctors had given roughly six years to live.

Cisneros was one of the lowest-paid major-city mayors in the country, with a $4,500-per-year stipend, and had supplemented his income with speaking fees and teaching urban affairs and government at Trinity University in the Department of Urban Studies.

In 1989, Cisneros left public office and became chairman of the Cisneros Asset Management Company, a national asset-management investment firm that managed $550 million in fixed-income accounts. During this period, he hosted Texans, a one-hour television show produced quarterly in Texas, and Adelante, a national daily Spanish-language radio commentary. He also served as deputy chairman of the Federal Reserve Bank of Dallas. Until he was named Secretary of HUD, he served as a board member of the Rockefeller Foundation, chairman of the National Civic League, and chairman of the Advisory Committee on the Construction of San Antonio's Alamodome.

A 1993 survey of historians, political scientists, and urban experts conducted by Melvin G. Holli of the University of Illinois at Chicago ranked Cisneros as the twelfth-best American big-city mayor to serve between 1820 and 1993. The survey also saw Cisneros ranked the second-best big-city mayor to serve in office post-1960.

== Secretary of Housing and Urban Development ==
As an advisor to Bill Clinton's successful 1992 presidential campaign, Cisneros was considered a possible replacement for several Texas officials appointed to positions in the new Democratic administration. He turned down an appointment as a U.S. senator from Texas for the seat formerly held by Lloyd Bentsen, who had been nominated as Secretary of the Treasury. Clinton nominated him to serve as his new Secretary of Housing and Urban Development (HUD). He was unanimously confirmed by the U.S. Senate and sworn into office by Chief Justice William Rehnquist on January 22, 1993. With the appointment, Cisneros became the highest-ranking Mexican-American official in U.S. politics.

Cisneros was praised for his work as HUD Secretary. Judith Evans reported in The Washington Post that both critics and supporters of Cisneros said he never lacked passion for his job and that he was able to make marginal changes that made HUD a more effective housing provider. Rep. Rick Lazio (R-NY), chairman of the House subcommittee on housing and community opportunity in 1996, said Cisneros displayed "the correct balance of advocacy on behalf of the president and a willingness to think creatively and outside the box in terms of solutions." In his 1999 book, Inside Game/Outside Game: Winning Strategies for Saving Urban America, urban policy consultant David Rusk wrote: "...in my view, (Cisneros was) the most successful of the ten secretaries of Housing and Urban Development since the cabinet agency was formed in 1965." Clinton said Cisneros was a brilliant public servant and added that people had no idea how much he had contributed to the government.

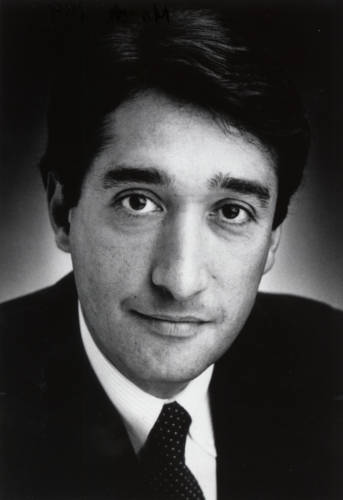
Cisneros during his tenure as Secretary

In his first full week as Secretary, Cisneros was confronted by the unprecedented growth in the number of homeless in the country's cities and declared homelessness "a highest priority." He quickly recommended that an economic stimulus package include $100 million to $150 million for homeless programs that mix housing and social services. Cisneros tapped Andrew Cuomo to serve as an assistant housing secretary, responsible for homelessness. He spent an evening touring a shelter and the streets in Washington, D.C. One night in late December 1994, he walked the streets of Minneapolis and St. Paul, talking to people without housing, and later flopped for the night in a shelter in an effort to understand homelessness firsthand. The next day, he announced $7.3 million in HUD funding for five Minnesota state projects for homeless youth and families. However, his efforts to alleviate the problem were often thwarted by a slow-moving bureaucracy. He described his frustration to Jill Smolowe in Time: "I can't believe how gridlocked the system is ... how irrelevant it is to things that are happening out in the country."

During his term, Cisneros reformed the public housing system. In his position, he inherited the massive undertaking of overseeing the implementation of the HOPE VI program. Initially authorized under the Housing and Community Development Act of 1992, the HOPE VI program marked a dramatic turnaround in public housing policy and was one of the most ambitious urban redevelopment efforts in the nation's history. The program is designed to tear down and redevelop severely distressed public housing projects occupied by low-income families into mixed-income housing. To do this, Section 8 housing vouchers are provided to enable the original residents to rent apartments in the private market.

As Secretary, Cisneros said HOPE VI was the last gasp for public housing. By the end of his term, Cisneros, through his agency, had renovated 250 public housing projects, authorized the demolition of 43,000 mostly vacant units, and advocated for demolishing a total of 100,000 units by the year 2000 in major urban cities. HOPE VI was not without controversy, and Cisneros even appeared on Montel Williams' talk show to discuss HUD's plan to raze America's most crime-ridden, dilapidated housing projects and replace them with attractive new homes with modern amenities in mixed-use developments.

During his attempts to reform public housing, Cisneros met with detractors, including housing advocates who at first feared his vision for restructuring the agency's familiar programs would reduce assistance to low-income families and depressed urban centers. Cisneros also supported legislation to give local public housing authorities the flexibility to adjust rents to encourage more working families to stay in public housing and evict drug dealers and other criminals from housing projects. Near the end of his tenure as Secretary, Cisneros told The Washington Post that he was most proud of his effort to reform public housing, changing the way local officials provide shelter to the country's poor. He long contended that the decline of public housing projects resulted from massive concentrations of the nation's poorest of the poor. Federal laws punished people for working, significantly raising rents as their wages rose.

In addition to HUD's focus on people experiencing poverty, Cisneros seized on the Clinton administration's goal of expanding homeownership opportunities. Under his command, HUD made significant progress in expanding homeownership among the country's most underrepresented groups — young adults, minorities, and low- to moderate-income families. When Cisneros arrived at HUD, the home ownership rate was 63.7 percent. When he left office in 1997, it had risen to 65.7 percent, its highest level since 1981. Under policies implemented by Cisneros' administration, homeownership continued its upward trend, reaching 67.5 percent by the end of Clinton's second term. At the close of his term, Cisneros acknowledged that lower interest rates and a strong economy were primary factors for the increase. However, the agency's ability to convince lenders, builders, and real estate agents that there was money to be made in selling housing to low- and moderate-income individuals played a significant role, he said.

As the Clinton administration's top housing official in the mid-1990s, Cisneros loosened mortgage restrictions, allowing first-time buyers to qualify for loans they had never been able to get before, contributing to the great housing and financial crisis that began 10 years later. However, in the August 5, 2008 issue of The Village Voice, Wayne Barrett argued that Andrew Cuomo made a series of decisions as Secretary of HUD between 1997 and 2001 that led to the Great Recession.

Cisneros resisted efforts to reduce or wholly eliminate the department substantially. During his four-year tenure, he worked with the agency's case while Congressional appropriators cut its budget. He presented a plan in 1995 to trim the department's budget by $13 billion over five years. Cisneros told the San Antonio Express-News: "There are efforts underway to eliminate important national efforts which provide shelter and assistance to millions of low-income Americans. I intend to stay and fight for our nation's commitment to people who need help and to reform HUD... This may be the last opportunity I have to be in public life...I just want to do everything I can to make the biggest difference I can."

Critics supported his efforts against budget cuts. Deborah Austin, director of legislation and policy for the National Low Income Housing Coalition, said in 1996, "For all we may not have liked about Cisneros, he was largely responsible for beating back pressure to eliminate and substantially reduce the department."

As Secretary, Cisneros addressed fair housing policies. He announced a plan for HUD to provide $70 million in housing vouchers, enabling low-income Americans to rent housing in the communities of their choice, an idea that drew criticism from Cisneros in affluent circles in his native Texas and elsewhere. When it came to justice in home loans, Cisneros, through his agency, told lenders that HUD would no longer tolerate the unfair denial of minorities' access to home loans and would penalize lenders who violated fair lending laws. The department also made it easier for alleged victims of fair housing to file complaints.

During Cisneros' four-year term, the agency's decisions in favor of victims of housing discrimination resulted in $80 million in damages, compared with $13 million in the previous four years. Cisneros streamlined the bureaucracy to address fair housing issues much more swiftly.

Cisneros assumed responsibility over the restructuring of the HUD bureaucracy. The agency's staff had been cut to 10,000 at the end of his term, from 13,500 since he took over. He consolidated offices, moved staff from headquarters to field offices, and increased management training. He reduced the number of agency programs from 240 to 20. The most difficult job for Cisneros in this reform was changing employees' attitudes, who were often resistant to improving service to their communities.

Cisneros also took a high-profile role in the cleanup operation after the 1994 Los Angeles earthquake.

== Medlar affair ==
In March 1995, US Attorney General Janet Reno bowed to demands of the new Republican majority in the House of Representatives and secured the appointment of an Independent Counsel, David Barrett, to investigate allegations that Cisneros had lied to FBI investigators during background checks before being named Secretary of HUD. He had been asked about payments that he had made to his former mistress, Linda Medlar, also known as Linda Jones. Both were married at the time when Medlar volunteered to work on Cisneros' campaign for Mayor of San Antonio. The affair had been 'public knowledge' for many years until Medlar sold the story to Inside Edition for $15,000. The investigation was based on Cisneros's statement to the FBI about the amount of money paid to his former mistress. It continued for 10 years, until January 2006, when Congress finally refused to fund it.

Citing the needs of his family, Cisneros ended his term as Secretary in January 1997. After the controversy became known during his first term as Secretary, Cisneros offered to resign to Clinton, who rejected it in a public statement describing Cisneros as "a good man and an effective public servant". Cisneros decided to stay in his position, adding in a statement in the San Antonio Express-News, "I regret any mistakes that I have made but affirm once again that I have at no point violated the public's trust."

He said the decision was largely driven by the mounting legal costs of defending an investigation by special prosecutor David Barrett into allegations that he had lied to the FBI about the size of payments he gave his former mistress, Linda Medlar. Cisneros, who made $148,000 annually in his cabinet position, had tuition bills for a daughter in her third year at New York University law school and another who was a fourth-year student at Stanford, in addition to continued medical care bills for his ailing son.

Medlar had filed a breach-of-contract lawsuit against Cisneros in 1994, claiming he had agreed to support her until her daughter's college graduation but had discontinued monthly payments. Cisneros had made payments to her after the end of their affair, discontinuing them only after taking a pay cut upon her return to public life. Although Cisneros had divulged the payments during the FBI background check preceding his appointment, Medlar's claims suggested that Cisneros might have misrepresented the amount. That led to Attorney General Janet Reno recommending a special prosecutor be appointed to investigate Cisneros in March 1995. In December 1997, Cisneros was indicted on 18 counts of conspiracy, giving false statements, and obstruction of justice. In September 1999, Cisneros negotiated a plea agreement, under which he pleaded guilty to a misdemeanor count of lying to the FBI and was fined $10,000. He did not receive jail time or probation.

Medlar used some of Cisneros's money to purchase a house and to enter into a bank fraud scheme with her sister and brother-in-law to conceal the source of the funds. In January 1998, Medlar pleaded guilty to 28 charges of bank fraud, conspiracy to commit bank fraud, and obstruction of justice.

Clinton later pardoned Cisneros in January 2001.

== After leaving public office ==
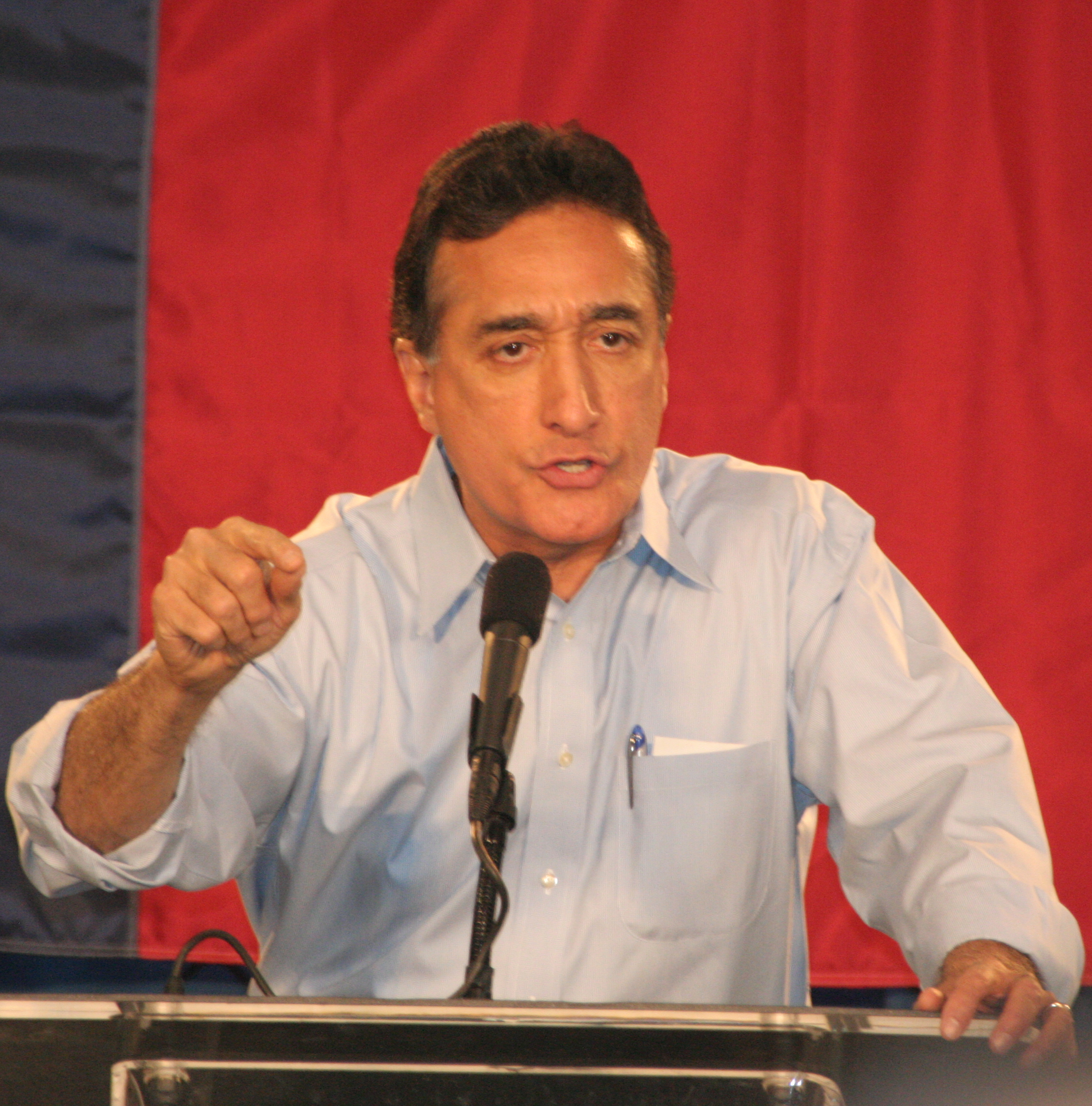
Cisneros speaks at a rally in 2006

After leaving HUD in January 1997, Cisneros moved his family to Los Angeles and served from 1997 to 2000 as president and chief operating officer of Univision Communications, the nation's largest Spanish-language broadcaster that had become the fifth-most-watched television network in the nation. Cisneros currently serves on Univision's board of directors. By 2000, Cisneros and his wife moved back to San Antonio.

Upon returning to San Antonio, Cisneros established a firm to develop affordable housing there and in other American cities. His commitment was to develop homes affordable to the core of America's workers, such as police, nurses, teachers, and city workers. "Home ownership is the way people step into the American dream," Cisneros told the San Diego Union-Tribune. "It creates access to the levers of wealth." The company he founded in 2000, American City Vista, to develop residential areas in the central zones of many of the nation's major metropolitan areas, evolved into CityView.

In November 2015, Cisneros became an equity partner in Siebert Brandford Shank & Co, an investment banking firm, subsequently called Siebert, Cisneros, Shank & Co. L.L.C.

Cisneros' continued involvement in the real estate industry led to him receiving multiple national honors. In 2006, Builder magazine named Cisneros #18 out of the top 50 most influential people in the real estate industry. In June 2007, Cisneros was inducted into the National Association of Homebuilders (NAHB) "Builders Hall of Fame" and honored by the National Housing Conference as the "Housing Person of the Year."

== Philanthropic efforts and board memberships ==
As a private citizen, Cisneros remains active in non-profit and civic leadership. He was an advisor to the American Democracy Institute; a trustee of the American Film Institute; and co-chair of the National Commission on Fair Housing and Equal Opportunity, to name a few. Cisneros is currently a board member for the Greater San Antonio Chamber of Commerce and after-School All-Stars, founded by California Governor Arnold Schwarzenegger, in addition to being a member of the Advisory Boards of the Bill and Melinda Gates Foundation and the Broad Foundation, among others. He also held a role in corporate leadership and has served as a board member of Live Nation, as well as the boards of major builder KB Home and the largest mortgage lender in the nation at one time, Countrywide Financial.

Cisneros co-chairs the Bipartisan Policy Center's Housing Commission and Immigration Task Force.

== Published works ==
Cisneros also served as author, editor or collaborator in several books, including Interwoven Destinies: Cities and the Nation, a project with the late former HUD Secretary Jack Kemp; Opportunity and Progress: A Bipartisan Platform for National Housing Policy was presented the Common Purpose Award for demonstrating the potential of bipartisan cooperation; and Casa y Comunidad: Latino Home and Neighborhood Design, a publication that took the first-ever look at the growing and increasingly prosperous U.S. Latino community and its housing needs, was awarded the Benjamin Franklin Silver Medal in the category of best business book of 2006. His most recent collaboration with the late former HUD Secretary Jack Kemp, Our Communities, Our Homes: Pathways to Housing and Homeownership in America's Cities and States, is a guide for local leaders in designing comprehensive housing policies. In 2018, he co-authored "Building Equitable Cities: How to Drive Economic Mobility and Regional Growth". The book provides real-world examples of both place-based and people-based strategies that are being used successfully to provide more equitable outcomes.

Cisneros served as a member of the Debt Reduction Task Force at the Bipartisan Policy Center.

=== America's cities and housing ===
Since his early education, Cisneros has sought to build America's future by improving the core of its cities and creating affordable housing for families in the country's workforce.

He is the only former HUD secretary to remain working in housing and urban affairs.

Cisneros received the 2002 National Inner City Leadership Award from the United States Conference of Mayors, honoring him for his work in promoting the revitalization of city economies. It was said of him when receiving the award: "Henry's unwavering dedication to this country's inner city economies is a testament to the difference one person can make." In 2007, Cisneros was honored with the "Housing Person of the Year" Award from the National Housing Conference, where it was said: "Without question, Henry Cisneros has demonstrated a lifelong dedication to providing housing to America's working families...." Together with Jack Kemp, he received the Walter F. Mondale and Edward W. Brooke Fair Housing Award in June 2009 from the Fair Housing Alliance.

Cisneros, either in the past or currently, served on several national commissions in urban affairs, such as the Partnership for Sustainable Communities Leadership Advisory Council, and the boards of the National Smart Growth Council and the National Alliance to End Homelessness. He presently serves as a member of the Technical Advisory Committee for the recovery effort in New Orleans and as co-chair of the National Commission on Fair Housing and Equal Opportunity.

=== San Antonio ===
Cisneros grew up in a middle class family in San Antonio. He and his wife now live in the small house that once belonged to his grandfather in the predominantly Latino inner west side. As mayor, one of his accomplishments was the designation of funds to the west side neighborhoods for capital improvements.

After returning home to San Antonio in 2000, Cisneros and his wife founded the nonprofit American Sunrise in 2001 to provide services to their neighbors within a one-square-mile area. From an after-school learning center for children to adult literacy classes, American Sunrise creates communities where working families can find economic, educational, and housing opportunities to improve the neighborhood's standard of living. Annually, 8–10 dilapidated homes are purchased, refurbished, and sold at very affordable prices to create more homeownership opportunities in poor central-city neighborhoods. Cisneros' wife, Mary Alice Cisneros, held his former seat on the City Council from 2007 to 2011.

Cisneros remains active in San Antonio's leadership, where he is Chairman of BioMed S.A., an effort to accelerate the city's health care and biosciences sector, on the board of the Greater San Antonio Chamber of Commerce, and is the incoming chair of the city's economic development council.

=== Latino affairs ===
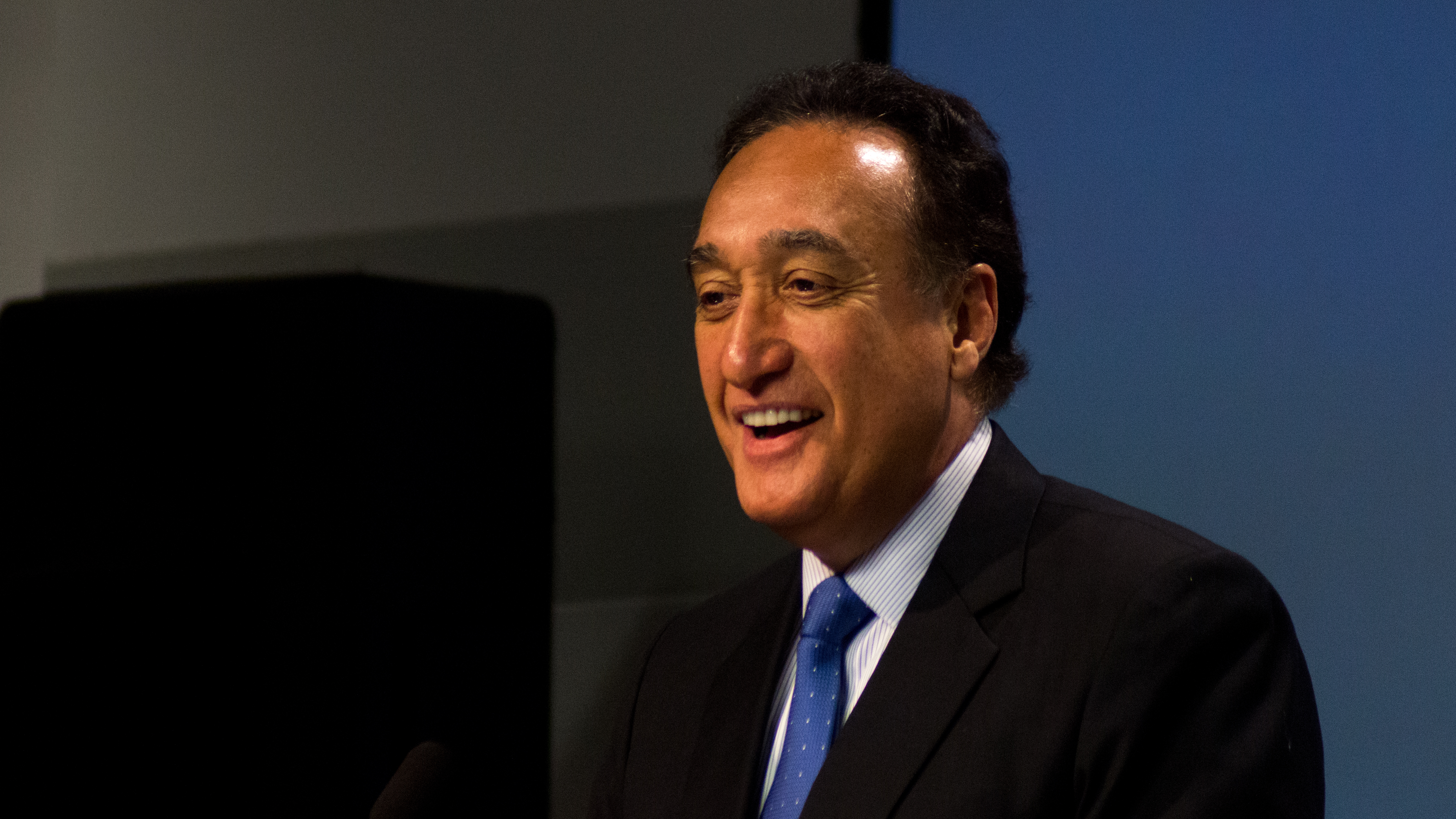
Cisneros in 2015

Cisneros is the co-creator of the National Hispanic Leadership Agenda. This group convenes quadrennially to provide a platform for discussing the major issues facing the Latino community and the nation as a whole. Additionally, Cisneros is a co-founder of the New American Alliance, a national organization united to promote the economic advancement of the American Latino community.

Cisneros has spoken to every major Latino group across the US and has served on the boards of numerous Latino organizations. He has also been honored with many awards and recognitions for his involvement and commitment to Latino issues. In 2007, Cisneros received the prestigious Maestro Award for Leadership at the Latino Leaders Summit, hosted by Latino Leaders magazine. In selecting Cisneros for the honor, Jorge Ferraez, publisher of Latino Leaders stated: "Henry Cisneros has demonstrated a life-long dedication to public service and improving the life of Latinos. At a time when the Latino community is prospering, we are pleased to honor Cisneros as a leader who has spent decades paving the way for Latino success in education, housing, and business."

The Latino population is projected to reach 63 million and account for 25 percent of the U.S. population by 2050, according to the U.S. Census Bureau. With that on the horizon, Cisneros says the United States' global competitiveness hinges on the progress of its Hispanic population, the fastest-growing minority group.

"The Latino population is growing so rapidly that American progress in the coming century is inextricably linked to the progress of the Latino community," Cisneros said. "Any investment in services that help lift Latinos into the middle class is an investment in the future of the entire country."

Cisneros said Hispanic immigrants must invest in American society by mastering English, putting their children through school, buying homes, providing their families with health care, and participating enthusiastically in civic, community, and religious activities. In 2009, he created the nonprofit group "Our Pledge" to help immigrants integrate into American society by improving their language skills and expanding their participation in military service and civic activities.

== Personal life ==
In 1969, Henry Cisneros married his high school sweetheart, Mary Alice Perez. They have two daughters, Teresa and Mercedes, and a son, John Paul.

Cisneros's father, who came from a family of small farmers who had settled in Colorado after losing their Spanish land grant during the Great Depression was a federal civil servant and later an Army colonel who met Elvira Munguia while he was stationed in San Antonio. As his parents survived great adversity and advanced through life with an unfailing belief in hard work, education and merit leading to a better life, Cisneros along with his two brothers and two sisters were raised in a highly structured environment that emphasized scholarly studies and the arts.

Cisneros was named after his mother's youngest brother who developed Hodgkin's disease at the age of 14 and asked from his deathbed that his sister give his name to her son. He is descended on his father's side from early Spanish settlers in New Mexico. His mother was the daughter of Rómulo Munguía, a relatively wealthy and well connected Mexican printer and intellectual, and Carolina Malpica Munguía, an educator, radio host, and community activist, who chose to leave Mexico in 1926 after the leftist Mexican Revolution and Cristero War

== Honors and awards ==
Cisneros has received multiple honors and awards.

- One of "Five Outstanding Young Texans", Texas Jaycees, 1976
- One of "Ten Outstanding Young Men of America" U.S. Jaycees, 1982
- Torch of Liberty Award, Anti-Defamation League of B'nai B'rith, 1982
- Jefferson Award, American Institute of Public Service, 1982
- Award for Contribution to American Cities and Politics, Harvard Foundation, 1985
- President's Medal of Merit, Pan American University, 1985
- Distinguished Leadership Award, American Institute of Planners, 1985
- National Recognition Award by the Mexican Government for 1985 Earthquake Assistance
- Honorary member, American Institute of Architects, 1986
- Outstanding Mayor "All-Pro City Management Team," City & State magazine (now Governing), September 1986
- Distinguished Service Award, Baylor College of Medicine, 1986
- Leadership in Local Government Award, American City & County magazine, 1987
- President's Award, National League of Cities, 1989
- Hispanic Man of the Year, VISTA Magazine, 1991
- Founder Award, Partners for Livable Communities, 1992
- MSC Student Conference on National Affairs Keynote Speaker, 1992
- Boys and Girls Clubs of America's Fourth Annual Legends and Fans Award, 1993
- Hubert H. Humphrey Civil Rights Award, Leadership Conference on Civil Rights, 1994
- Hero of the People Award, ACORN, 1994
- Family Housing Legacy Award, Los Angeles Family Housing, 2000
- Humanitarian Award, Los Angeles Inner City Law Center, 2001
- Lifetime Achievement Award, Para Los Niños, 2001
- Theodor Herzl Award, Municipality of Jerusalem & The Jerusalem Fund of Aish HaTorah, 2001
- Environmental Hero Award for Business, California League of Conservation Voters, 2001
- Hammer of Hope Award, Habitat for Humanity of Orange County, CA, 2002
- Hadassah Award, San Antonio Chapter, 2002
- National Inner City Leadership Award, Initiative for a Competitive Inner City, April 2002
- Congressional Hispanic Caucus Institute Medallion of Excellence for Leadership, 2002
- Torah Learning Center (TLC) Moreshet Heritage Award, 2003
- Aguila Azteca, Government of the Republic of Mexico, 2003
- Catherine Powell Distinguished Service Award, Texas City Planners Association, 2004
- Builder of the Year, El Nuevo Constructor magazine, 2004
- James W. Rouse Civic Medal of Honor, Enterprise Community Partners, 2004
- Israel Bonds Leadership Award, 2004
- Martin Luther King Jr. Distinguished Achievement Award, San Antonio Martin Luther King Jr. Commission, 2005
- Civil Rights Award, NEWSED Community Development Corporation, 2005
- Excellence in Affordable Housing Initiatives, City of San Antonio, 2005
- Trinity Prize for Innovative Urban Governance, Mayor of San Antonio 1981–1989, 2005
- Common Ground Award for Bipartisan Cooperation (shared with Jack Kemp), Search for Common Ground, March 2005
- Top 101 "Top Leaders of the Hispanic Community," Latino Leaders magazine, 2006
- Business Man of the Year, Texas Association of Mexican-American Chambers of Commerce, July 2006
- Lifetime Achievement Award, San Antonio Hispanic Chamber of Commerce, July 2006
- Top 50 "Most Influential People in Home Building," Builder magazine, December 2006
- Cesar Chavez Award, American Association for Affirmative Action, 2007
- National Hispanic Hero Award, United States Hispanic Leadership Institute, 2007
- Housing Person of the Year, National Housing Conference, June 2007
- Inductee, Builders Hall of Fame, National Association of Home Builders, June 2007
- President's Award, National Council of La Raza, July 2007
- Maestro Award for Leadership, Latino Leaders magazine, August 2007
- Housing Leadership Award, National Low Income Housing Coalition, February 2008
- Visionary Award, Hispanic College Fund, May 2008
- National Leadership Honoree, Hispanic Elected Local Officials, June 2008
- Hubert H. Humphrey Award, The American Political Science Association, August 2008
- Visionary Award, Habitat for Humanity Los Angeles, October 2008
- Walter F. Mondale and Edward W. Brooke Fair Housing Award, National Fair Housing Alliance, June 2009

In addition, Cisneros has received numerous honorary degrees. Most recently, an Honorary Doctor of Laws from Occidental College in Los Angeles in 2000.

== Books, writings, and speeches ==
Cisneros has a significant history of authoring, co-authoring, editing, and contributing to several books and publications, as well as giving speeches, narrating, and making television appearances.

- "A Survival Strategy for America's Cities", Richard S. Childs Lecture in Municipal Administration, The City Club of New York, 1982
- "San Antonio's Place in the Technology Economy; A Review of Opportunities and a Blueprint for Action", 1982
- "Target 1990; Goals and Decisions for San Antonio's Future," authored as Mayor, 1983
- Samuel Rubin Lecture, Samuel Rubin Program for the Advancement of Liberty and Equality through Law, Columbia Law School, February 24, 1986
- Chubb Fellowship (lecture), Timothy Dwight College, Yale University, 1986
- Daily Radio Commentary, 40 radio stations, produced by Tichenor Broadcasting, 1989–1992
- Tomás Rivera Lecture, American Association of Hispanics in Higher Education, 1992
- "Interwoven Destinies: Cities and the Nation", (ISBN 0-393-96582-1, W. W. Norton & Company, NY, 1993), Editor, The American Assembly
- "Urban America: HUD's call to action", Urban Land magazine (ISSN 0042-0891, v.53, n.1, pp. 22–24, January 1994)
- "Comic Relief VI", (national broadcast HBO, January 15, 1994) cast member
- "Earth Angels: Migrant Children in America", (ISBN 0-87654-074-4, Pomegranate 1994), Introduction, Nancy Buirski (Photographer), Ruben Blades (Afterword)
- "Legacy for a Reinvented HUD: Charting a New Course in Changing and Demanding Times", Cityscape journal of policy development and research, (Volume 1, Number 3, U.S. Department of Housing and Urban Development, September 1995)
- "Secretary's Essay Series, (9 essays)" (U.S. Department of Housing and Urban Development, 1995–1996)
  - "University and the Urban Challenge ", first in a series, January 1995
  - "Defensible Space: Deterring Crime and Building Community ", second in a series, January 1995
  - "Regionalism: The New Geography of Opportunity", third in a series, March 1995
  - "Urban Entrepreneurialism and National Economic Growth", fourth in a series, September 1995
  - "Higher Ground: Faith Communities and Community Building", fifth in a series, February 1996
  - "Preserving Everybody's History ", sixth in a series, February 1996
  - "Fathers and Families: Changing the Rules", seventh in a series, December 1996
  - "Urban Land and the Urban Prospect", eighth in a series, December 1996
  - "Community Colleges and Urban Development", ninth in a series, December 1996
- "Chicano! History of the Mexican-American Civil Rights Movement", (national broadcast PBS, April 1996) narrator, by Hector Galán: Producer
- "Report on the state of America's communities", delivered to the National Press Club, Washington, D.C., April 25, 1996
- "The Mexican American Family Album (The American Family Albums)", (ISBN 0-19-512426-X, Oxford University Press, 1998) by Dorothy Hooble and Thomas Hoobler, Introduction
- "The Millennial City: Classic Readings on U.S. Urban Policy", (ISBN 978-0-7623-0572-8, Elsevier 1999). From series: Research in Urban Policy v. 12, edited by R.D. Norton
- "The Forgotten Americans", (national broadcast PBS, December 2000) narrator, by Hector Galán: Writer, Producer, Director
- "Where Will The Poor Live? Housing Policy and the Location of Low-Income Households", webcast (Richard and Rhoda Goldman School of Public Policy, UC Berkeley, February 7, 2003)
- "Homes for Americans in the 21st Century: Challenges and Opportunities for the Nation", Fifth Annual John T. Dunlop Lecture, Joint Center for Housing Studies of Harvard University, September 29, 2003
- "Conversations", (KLRN Public Television, San Antonio) host, 2003 – present
- "Cinco de Mayo", (national broadcast History Channel, October 2004) narrator, by Hector Galán: Producer, Director
- "Promise and Betrayal: Universities and the Battle for Sustainable Urban Neighborhoods", (ISBN 0-7914-6483-0, SUNY Press, 2005) by John I. Gilderbloom and R.L. Mullins Jr., foreword
- "Opportunity and Progress: A Bipartisan Platform for National Housing Policy", (Joint Center for Housing Studies, 2005, no ISBN) with Jack Kemp, Kent W. Colton, and Nicolas P. Retsinas
- "The Future of the American City", Fourth Annual James W. Rouse Lecture, webcast, September 25, 2005
- "About Children: An Authoritative Resource on the State of Childhood Today", (ISBN 1-58110-142-2, American Academy of Pediatrics, 2005), by Arthur G. Cosby, PhD, Robert E. Greenberg, MD, Linda Hill Southward, PhD, and Michael Weitzman, MD, contributor Ch. 8
- "Casa y Comunidad: Latino Home and Neighborhood Design", (ISBN 978-0-86718-613-0, BuilderBooks.com, 2006) with John Rosales
- "Our Communities, Our Homes: Pathways to Housing and Homeownership in America's Cities and States", (ISBN 978-0-9761481-1-1, Joint Center for Housing Studies, 2007) with Jack Kemp, Kent W. Colton, and Nicolas P. Retsinas
- "Latinos and the Nations Future", (ISBN 1-55885-542-4, Arte Público Press, 2008), Editor
- "From Despair to Hope: HOPE VI and the Transformation of America's Public Housing", (ISBN 0-8157-1425-4, Brookings Institution Press, 2009), Editor
- "Getting The Nation's Housing Sector Back on Track", article (National League of Cities, January 2009)
- "A Fence Can't Stop the Future", essay (Newsweek magazine, January 17, 2009)

== Affiliations ==
Throughout his career, Cisneros has been and continues to be associated with numerous business, corporate, housing trade, civic and governmental, educational, and charitable organizations.

- Chairman, San Antonio Fire and Police Pension Fund, 1981–1989
- Member, President's National Bipartisan Commission on Central America, 1983–1984
- Fellow, National Academy of Public Administration, 1984 – present
- Visiting Fellow, Harvard University, 1985
- President, Texas Municipal League, 1985
- Co-chair, Texas Response to the 1985 Mexico Earthquake, 1985
- Member, Board of Regents, Texas A&M University, 1985–1987
- Trustee, Notre Dame University, 1985–1988
- Member, Council on Foreign Relations, New York, 1985–1993
- President, National League of Cities, 1986
- Member, Bilateral Commission on the Future of United States–Mexican Relations, Ford Foundation, 1986–1989
- Member, Board of Trustees, Baylor College of Medicine, 1987–1990
- Member, Governor's (TX) Task Force on Education Finance in Texas, 1989
- Chairman, San Antonio Education Partnership, 1989–1992
- Chairman, Stadium Advisory Committee, Alamodome, 1989–1992
- Member, The Rockefeller Foundation, 1989–1992
- Chair, Board of Trustees, The Tomás Rivera Policy Institute, Claremont Graduate University, California, 1989–1992
- Member, Inter-American Dialogue, 1989–1993
- Board Member, National Endowment for Democracy, 1990
- Member, Commission on America in the New World, Carnegie Endowment for International Peace, 1990
- Member, Governor's (TX) Task Force on Revenues, 1991
- Deputy Chairman, Federal Reserve Bank of Dallas, 1991–1992
- Board Member, Lyndon B. Johnson Foundation, 1991–1992
- Board Member, The American Assembly, 1991–1992
- President Clinton Transition Committees, 1992–1993 and 1996–1997
- Speaker, MSC Student Conference on National Affairs
- Vice-chairman, President Clinton's Summit for America's Future (Summit on Volunteerism), 1997
- Co-founder, New America Alliance, 1999
- Chairman, Rand Corporation Sub-Committee on Urban Education, 2000
- Member, Board of Directors, KB Home, 2000–2003
- Board Member, Countrywide Financial Corporation, 2000–2007
- Board Member, Greater San Antonio Chamber of Commerce, 2000 – present
- Member, Development Committee, University of Texas at San Antonio, 2000 – present
- Member, Fannie Mae National Advisory Council, 2001
- Chairman, Every Texan Foundation, 2001
- Trustee, American Film Institute, 2001
- Chairman, San Antonio Hispanic Chamber of Commerce, 2001–2003
- Senior Advisor and board member, Enterprise Community Investment, 2001 – present
- Board Member, Institute for a Competitive Inner City, 2002
- Member, Advisory Committee, Harvard University, School of Education, 2002–2004
- Member, Board of Visitors, Claremont Graduate University, 2002–2005
- Member, Advisory Committee, UCLA School of Public Policy, 2002–2006
- Chairman and co-founder, American Sunrise Communities, 2002 – present
- Board Member, Cancer Therapy & Research Center at The University of Texas Health Science Center, San Antonio, 2002 – present
- Investor, Ventana Communities, 2003–2007
- Jury Member, The Broad Prize for Urban Education, 2003 – present
- Vice Chairman, Executive Committee, San Antonio Economic Development Foundation, 2003 – present
- Board Member, Avanzar Interior Technologies, Joint Venture with Johnson Controls, 2003 – present
- Board Member, The Broad Foundation, 2004 – present
- Board Member, After-School All-Stars, 2004 – present
- Board Member, Merage Foundation for the American Dream, 2004 – present
- Board Member, New Democratic Network, 2004 – present
- Board Member, National Alliance to End Homelessness, 2004 – present
- Member, Freddie Mac Blue Ribbon Advisory Committee, 2005
- Board Member, National Smart Growth Council, 2005 – present
- Chairman, BioMed SA, 2005 – present
- Member, Homes for Working Families, 2005 – present
- Board Member, National Children's Health Forum, 2005 – present
- Board Member, Live Nation, 2005–2007
- Advisory Board Member, The Raul Yzaguirre Policy Institute, 2006 – present
- Advisory Board Member, TMC (Teaching & Mentoring Communities), formerly Texas Migrant Council, 2006 – present
- Board Member, Capital One Community Renewal Fund, 2007
- Trustee, Strong American Schools, 2007
- Advisory Board Member, UCLA School of Public Affairs, 2007
- Chairman, Technical Advisory Committee, Office of Recovery Development and Administration, New Orleans, 2007 – present
- Chairman, Our Pledge, 2007 – present
- Member, Board of Councilors, University of Southern California, School of Policy, Planning, and Development, 2007 – present
- Board Member, Univision, 2007 – present
- Advisory Board Member, United States Program Advisory Panel, Bill & Melinda Gates Foundation, 2007 – present
- Co-chair, The National Commission on Fair Housing and Equal Opportunity, 2008
- Member, Leadership Advisory Council, Partnership for Sustainable Communities, 2009
- Advisory Board Chairman, The National Hispanic University, 2012–present
- Founder, The Cisneros Center for New Americans, 2014–present

== See also ==
- List of people pardoned or granted clemency by the president of the United States

Political offices
| Preceded by Lila Cockrell | Mayor of San Antonio; 1981–1989 | Succeeded by Lila Cockrell |
| Preceded by Jack Kemp | United States Secretary of Housing and Urban Development; 1993–1997 | Succeeded by Andrew Cuomo |
U.S. order of precedence (ceremonial)
| Preceded by Donna Shalala as Former U.S. Cabinet Member | Order of precedence of the United States as Former U.S. Cabinet Member | Succeeded by Hazel R. O'Leary as Former U.S. Cabinet Member |
