= Paul K. Sybrowsky =

Second Quorum of the Seventy
- April 2, 2005 – October 1, 2011
- Called by: Gordon B. Hinckley
- End reason: Honorably released

Personal details
- Born: Paul Kay Sybrowsky; August 22, 1944; Salt Lake City, Utah, United States
- Died: September 10, 2014 (aged 70); Salt Lake City, Utah, United States

Paul Kay Sybrowsky (August 22, 1944 – September 10, 2014) was the president of Southern Virginia University (SVU) from June 1, 2012 until August 31, 2014. He was a general authority of the Church of Jesus Christ of Latter-day Saints (LDS Church) from 2005 until 2011. He also served as a commissioner of the Northwest Commission on Colleges and Universities and chairman of the board of trustees of Utah Valley University.

== Early life and education ==
Sybrowsky was born in Salt Lake City, Utah to Paul H. Sybrowsky and his wife, Elizabeth "Betty" Ann Fowler Sybrowsky.

Sybrowsky received a bachelor's degree from Brigham Young University (BYU). He had started his education at what was then called the Church College of Hawaii, now known as Brigham Young University–Hawaii. He has served as a member of the President's Leadership Council at both BYU and BYU–Hawaii. He has also served as chair of the Provo Public Library board.

== Business experience ==
During his professional career, Sybrowsky worked as an executive for several corporations. He worked for a time as the general manager of the American Library Services division of Ameritech. He later worked at library automation giant Dynix, Inc was one of the co-founders of the company.

He was honored by the American Library Association with the ALA Medal of Excellence in 2000 for his support of the Snowbird Leadership Institute and Trustee commitment.

During his career he worked for several years in Canada and in England for a time. Sybrowsky co-founded Management Dynamics with his son, Joel, among others. Similar to others he was involved with, this company was also involved in library services.

== LDS Church experience ==
Sybrowsky served as a LDS Church missionary in the Canadian Mission headquartered in Toronto from 1964 to 1966. He later served as a bishop (of the Hyde Park Ward in London, England), as a member of a stake high council, and as a counselor in a stake presidency. Sybrowsky was president of the BYU 9th Stake from 1996 until 2001, when he was succeeded by Thomas B. Griffith. From 2001 to 2004, Sybrowsky was president of the church's Canada Toronto West Mission.

Sybrowsky was an LDS general authority and member of the Second Quorum of the Seventy from 2005 to 2011. During this time, he served first as a counselor and then as president of the church's Australia Area and later as an assistant executive director of the Church History Department.

== Family and personal life ==
Sybrowsky and his wife, Evelyn "Lynne" Frances Prior Sybrowsky, are the parents of nine children. Sybrowsky met Lynne while he was serving as a missionary in Montreal. Her family had joined the LDS Church in England about ten years earlier and later emigrated to Canada. After he returned from his mission, Sybrowsky began dating her while they were both students at BYU. They were married in the Salt Lake Temple in 1968.

He died at the age of 70 on September 10, 2014.

== Notes ==
Academic offices
Preceded by Rodney K. Smith	President of Southern Virginia University; 2012 — 2014	Succeeded by Reed N. Wilcox
