= Housing commission =

Housing commission of Housing Commission may refer to:

== State housing authorities in Australia ==
- Queensland Housing Commission
- Housing Commission of Victoria
- Housing NSW

== Other ==
- Millennial Housing Commission, a United States inquiry into housing
- South Australian Housing Trust, public housing authority in South Australia
