= Henry Cisneros payments controversy =

1995 political row

The Henry Cisneros payments controversy was a lengthy investigation begun in 1995 into allegations that Henry Cisneros, United States Secretary of Housing and Urban Development during the Presidency of Bill Clinton, had lied to the FBI background check investigators about payments he had made to his former mistress. Independent Counsel David Barrett was appointed to investigate the matter. In 1995 Cisneros was indicted; in 1997 he pleaded guilty to a misdemeanor; in 2001 he was pardoned by President Bill Clinton. The Independent Counsel investigation continued, however, focusing on allegations of obstruction of justice by the Clinton administration. It issued a final report, known as the Barrett Report, in 2006 that did little to resolve matters.

== Independent Counsel's investigation ==
In March 1995, Attorney General of the United States Janet Reno secured the appointment of an Independent Counsel, David Barrett to investigate allegations that Cisneros had lied to FBI investigators during background checks prior to being named Secretary of HUD. He had been asked about payments that he had made to former mistress Linda Medlar, also known as Linda Jones. The affair had been 'public knowledge' for a number of years—during the 1992 presidential campaign, U.S. Treasurer Catalina Vasquez Villalpando publicly referred to Cisneros and candidate Clinton as "two skirt-chasers"—but Cisneros lied about the amount of money he had paid to Medlar. The investigation continued for three and a half years.

In December 1997, Cisneros was indicted on 18 counts of conspiracy, giving false statements and obstruction of Justice. Medlar used some of the Cisneros hush money to purchase a house and entered into a bank fraud scheme with her sister and brother-in-law to conceal the source of the money. In January 1998, Medlar pleaded guilty to 28 charges of bank fraud, conspiracy to commit bank fraud and obstruction of justice.

In September 1999, Cisneros negotiated a plea agreement, under which he pleaded guilty to a misdemeanor count of lying to the FBI, and was fined $10,000. He did not receive jail-time or probation. He was pardoned by President Clinton in January 2001 (see: List of people pardoned by Bill Clinton). The independent counsel investigation continued after the pardon focusing on alleged obstruction of justice. In May 2005, Senator Dorgan (D-ND) proposed ending funding for the investigation; negotiators refused to include the provision in a bill funding military operations in Afghanistan. The funding at that point for the investigation totaled $21 million.

According to a New York Daily News report on October 3, 2005, "lawyers are fighting to suppress a potentially embarrassing final report from the probe that found Housing Secretary Henry Cisneros lied to the FBI about paying $250,000 in hush money to his ex-mistress... Lawyers at the Washington firm Williams & Connolly who work for Cisneros and both Clintons have argued to judges overseeing the case that allegations of illegal activity, for which no charges were filed, should be snipped before the report is made public."

On January 19, 2006, The New York Times reported that the independent counsel was finally closing his investigation with a report accusing the Clinton administration of thwarting the inquiry into Cisneros.

The Office of the Independent Counsel issued a press release along with the final report stating:

An accurate title for the Report could be, What We Were Prevented from Investigating. After a thorough reading of the Report it would not be unreasonable to conclude as I have that there was a coverup at high levels of our government and, it appears to have been substantial and coordinated. The question is why? And that question regrettably will go unanswered. Unlike some other coverups, this one succeeded.

The Independent Counsel's report has been a source of partisan bickering because it was heavily redacted with an estimated 120 pages removed by court order.
