= Billy Riggs =

American author and city planner

William "Billy" Riggs
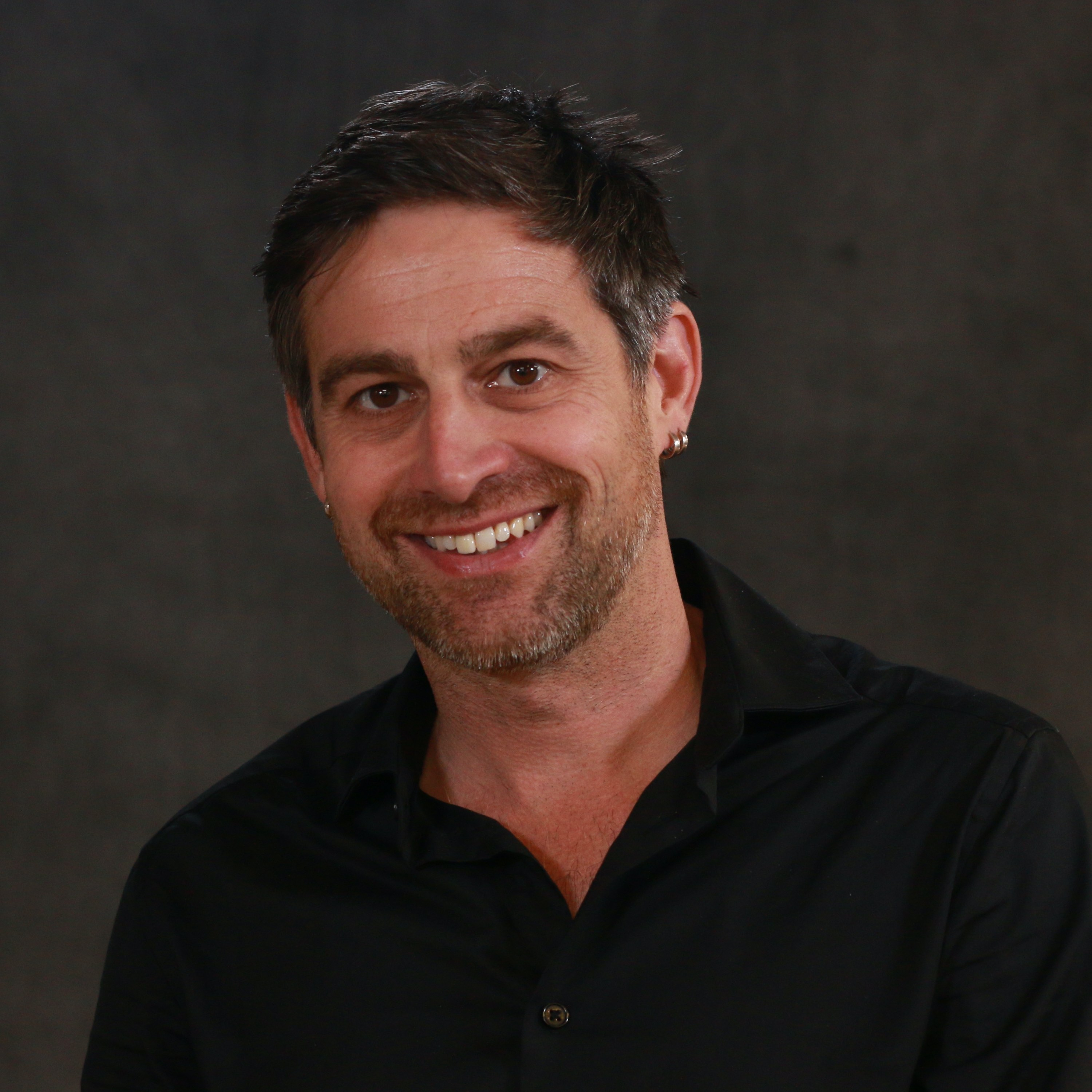
- Billy Riggs
- Born: Louisville, Kentucky
- Education: University of California, Berkeley (Ph.D., 2011) University of Louisville (M.S., 2003) Ball State University (B.A., 2001)
- Website: http://www.williamriggs.com/ http://billyriggsband.com

William Warren "Billy" Riggs is an author, city planner, entrepreneur and professor of Management at University of San Francisco and Director of the Autonomous Vehicles and the City Initiative. He is an international expert in the areas of sustainable transport, technology, urban development and the future of cities and the author of the book, End of the Road: Reimagining the Street as the Heart of the City and Disruptive Transport: Driverless Cars, Transport Innovation and the Sustainable City of Tomorrow. He has worked as a professional planner, in venture capital for Just Business and a strategic consultant for various technology firms and startups. He also has experience as a successful recording artist and music producer, having worked on award-winning projects with Frances England, Gabriel Riggs and Carlos Villarreal.

== Early life and education ==
Riggs was born in the Louisville, Kentucky metro. He is of German-Jewish descent and his great-great-grandfather, a baker from Frankfort, Kentucky fled Germany in the late 1800s to avoid persecution and mandatory military service. He also is said to have some Native American heritage in addition to having relatives from Ireland, England and the former Austro-Hungarian empire. His maternal grandfather was William Gorman managed an oil business for Palm Springs developer, Ray Ryan.

Riggs grew up on a farm outside Louisville where he was consistently exposed to art and education including "his father's eclectic record collection" which included work ranging from Icarus by Paul Winter Consort to The Planets by Gustav Holst. He attended Graceland Christian High School in New Albany, Indiana and where he excelled academically and athletically, being honored as both Valedictorian and Athlete of the Year in his senior year. He also played in two bands during this period, the Hermits, and Just Visiting.

He attended Ball State University and studied history with a focus on art and architecture while participating in NCAA Division I Cross Country and Track and Field. His senior thesis attempted to understand the social cultural influences of modern religious music. As a student athlete he was selected to represent Ball State the 2000 NCAA national leadership conference. In 2009 he was honored with a Graduate of the Last Decade award.

After graduating from Ball State he studied for a Master's of Urban Planning at University of Louisville. While at Louisville he continued to be involved with athletics but also began to hone his design and technology skills. Riggs also worked as an intern at the Robert Doughty Consultancy in Lincolnshire, England during this period.

After five years of work for the US Coast Guard he attended Berkeley for a PhD in City and Regional Planning, studying under Dr. Robert Cervero, Dr. William Satariano, Dean Sam Davis and Dr. Malo Hutson. While at Berkeley, Riggs focused on work in walkability and housing that was featured in the San Francisco Chronicle, and the Wall Street Journal. He also became influenced by Rich Lyons, Dean of the Haas School of Business, on the topics of leadership, behavioral economics and human capital. He wrote about those in a 2010 article talking about economic development, the information economy and the lack of jobs in his hometown of Louisville.

== Professional career ==
Riggs has worked as professor at numerous academic institutions, a venture partner at the social impact venture capital firm, Just Business and an urban designer / environmental / land use / transportation planner for the UC Berkeley, the international consulting firm Arup, and the US Coast Guard. At Just Business he successfully invested-in and advised green tech companies including American Battery Technology Company and Hydra Energy. While at UC Berkeley he worked as the Transportation Program manager and was praised for his efforts in promoting bicycle transportation and acquiring a $1.8M grant from the Federal Highway Administration to improve parking and transportation systems in Berkeley.

Riggs was a professor of City Planning at California Polytechnic State University in San Luis Obispo from 2013 to 2017. He was awarded campus research grants in 2013 and 2014, and was selected as a Service Learning Faculty Fellow in 2014. He served as a Commissioner for the City of San Luis Obispo's Planning Commission. He served on Transportation Research Board's Standing Committee on Transportation Law and Standing Committee on Transportation Economics and on the City of Palo Alto's Planning and Transportation Commission, including a term as chair, before resigning in 2021. In November 2022 he was successful in passing a $10.4M school bond as a trustee for Horicon School District garnering over 75% of voter support for the measure.

In addition to his role as a professor, he consults for INTNCITY (previously Sustinere) and advises numerous organizations and companies globally which have included American Battery Technology Company, Hydra Energy, Heex.io, Atmos Financial, and OppSites. He is one of the co-creators of the SFLuv blockchain based community reinvestment platform and has written about how distributed autonomous organizations can be used to finance local infrastructure.

== Research ==
Riggs has gained national recognition for his publications and is an active researcher. He was awarded the University of San Francisco, Outstanding Research Award in 2018, for "his prodigious stream of work bridging urban planning, public administration and policy analysis toward more livable communities." His work has been featured in The Economist, The Wall Street Journal, The Washington Post, Governing Magazine, Courier Journal, The Atlantic, Popular Science, Planetizen.com and many more. He issued a noteworthy report on autonomous vehicles in 2020 entitled A Policy Framework for the Future of Automated Mobility: The Need for Local Government Policy, urban technology research that called cities to rethink their web strategies and was an author of the American Planning Association's national policy guidance on autonomous vehicles, Planning for Autonomous Mobility.

He is an expert on future cities and self-driving cars and was featured in a 2018 special report in The Economist, talking about the "social equity implications around the fringes of cities." He has written more about autonomy and cities in a Planetizen series called Autonomous Future and heavily cited for his market expertise in autonomous technology and his research with Cruise and Waymo. Dr. Riggs' first startup, the ReStreet app, was featured by CityLab as a tool to rethink streets for autonomous vehicles. His research on street design is also of note and has received nationwide attention in that it called for conversion of multi-lane one-way streets as one part of an economic development strategy but also cautioned for a balanced approach to comprehensive economic development.

Riggs has been quoted as wanting to design streets to create, "a more livable environment" and argued that traffic calming can have an "economic development benefit... (and) we can actually focus on livability and environmental sustainability at the same time as economic vitality." Urban thinker Richard Florida has featured his work on spatial inequity and walkability, stating that it "reminds us that not all urbanites have the same kind of access to walkable streets and neighborhoods." He was among the authors of an open letter supporting economic non-aggression for cities competing to host the Amazon.com second headquarters, along with Richard Florida, Robert Reich, Edward Glaeser, and Jeff Sachs. In an interview with USA Today he framed the issue as "a race to the bottom." He also has been vocal that while competition for jobs can jumpstart housing and transit projects, "something must be done to mitigate (the urban impacts of unmitigated tech growth)."

Dr. Riggs has been an advocate of reducing auto-dependency with innovative transportation, which he discussed in the 2021 KQED documentary, Moving San Francisco. In 2023 he was featured in the San Francisco Examiner, discussing the future of transportation in cities. He was quote as saying "Transportation doesn’t exist unless there’s an origin and a destination... part of starting from scratch in San Francisco is bringing those destinations together.” He went on to state that, "Societally, we have to accept that driving is a privilege... a privilege that comes with costs in terms of emissions."

=== Select publications ===
- Cornet, H., Riggs, W., Gkemou, M, & Dreher S. 2024. On International Collaboration Within Research Projects for Large-Scale Piloting of Shared Automated Mobility. In Shared Mobility Revolution: Pioneering Autonomous Horizons. Eds. Cornet, H. & Gkemou, M. https://link.springer.com/content/pdf/10.1007/978-3-031-71793-2.pdf#page=230
- Riggs, W., Schrage, N., Shukla, S., & Mark, S. (2023). The Trip Characteristics of a Pilot Autonomous Vehicle Rider Program: Revealing Late Night Service Needs and Desired Increases in Service Quality, Reliability and Safety. In G. Meyer & S. Beiker (Eds.), Road Vehicle Automation 10 (pp. 93–107). Springer Nature Switzerland. https://doi.org/10.1007/978-3-031-34757-3_9
- Boeing, G. and Riggs, W. (2022). Converting One-Way Streets to Two-Way Streets to Improve Transportation Network Efficiency and Reduce Vehicle Distance Traveled. Journal of Planning Education and Research. https://doi.org/10.1177/0739456X221106334 | https://transfersmagazine.org/magazine-article/issue-11/rethinking-the-one-way-street/
- Riggs, W. (2022) End of the Road: Reimagining the Street as the Heart of the City. Bristol University Press: Bristol. https://bristoluniversitypress.co.uk/end-of-the-road
- Riggs, W. and Shukla, S. (2021). Exploring the benefits of minimobility in the urban context: The case of central Stockholm. Journal of Transport and Land Use. https://www.jtlu.org/index.php/jtlu/article/view/1955
- Riggs, W., Sethi M., Meares, W., and Batstone, D. (2021). Prefab Micro-Units as a Strategy for Affordable Housing. Housing Studies. 84:2. https://www.tandfonline.com/doi/full/10.1080/02673037.2020.1830040
- Riggs, W., B. Appleyard, and M. Johnson. (2020). A Design Framework for Livable Streets in the Era of Autonomous Vehicles. Urban, Planning and Transport Research. https://www.tandfonline.com/doi/full/10.1080/21650020.2020.1749123
- Griffin, G. P., M. Mulhall, C. Simek, and W. Riggs. (2020). Mitigating Bias in Big Data for Transportation. Journal of Big Data Analytics in Transportation. https://doi.org/10.1007/s42421-020-00013-0.
- Riggs, W. (2019) Disruptive Transport: Driverless Cars, Transport Innovation and the Sustainable City of Tomorrow. Routledge: London. https://www.routledge.com/Disruptive-Transport-Driverless-Cars-Transport-Innovation-and-the-Sustainable/Riggs/p/book/9781138613164
- Riggs, W. (2018) Technology, Civic Engagement and Street Science: Hacking the Future of Participatory Street Design in the Era of Self-Driving Cars (February 1, 2018). Available at https://dx.doi.org/10.2139/ssrn.3117731
- Riggs, W; Appleyard, B. (2018). The economic impact of one to two-way street conversions: advancing a context-sensitive framework. Journal of Urbanism: International Research on Placemaking and Urban Sustainability. https://doi.org/10.1080/17549175.2017.1422535
- Schlossberg, M., Riggs, W., Millard-Ball, Shay, E. (2018). "Rethinking the Street in an Era of Driverless Cars" UrbanismNext http://works.bepress.com/williamriggs/95/
- Riggs, W. (2017). Painting the fence: Social norms as economic incentives to non-automotive travel behavior. Travel Behaviour and Society. 7, 26–33. https://doi.org/10.1016/j.tbs.2016.11.004
- Riggs, W. (2017). Mobile responsive websites and local planning departments in the US: Opportunities for the future. Environment and Planning B: Urban Analytics and City Science. 44 (5), 947–963. https://doi.org/10.1177/0265813516656375
- Riggs, W; Gilderbloom. J. (2016) Two-way street conversion: evidence of increased livability in Louisville. Journal of Planning Education and Research. 36 (1), 105–118. https://doi.org/10.1177/0739456X15593147
- Riggs, W (2016). "Inclusively Walkable: Exploring the Equity of Walkable Neighborhoods in the San Francisco Bay Area". Local Environment. 19 (5): 1–28. doi:10.1080/13549839.2014.982080.
- Riggs, W.; Kuo, J. (2015). "The impact of targeted outreach for parking mitigation on the UC Berkeley campus". Case Studies in Transport Policy. 3 (2): 151–158. doi:10.1016/j.cstp.2015.01.004.
- Gilderbloom, J. I.; Riggs, W. W.; Meares, W. L. (2015). "Does walkability matter? An examination of walkability's impact on housing values, foreclosures and crime". Cities. 42: 13–24. doi:10.1016/j.cities.2014.08.001. S2CID 153747507.
- Riggs, W (2014). "Steps toward validity in active living research: Research design that limits accusations of physical determinism". Health & Place. 26: 7–13. doi:10.1016/j.healthplace.2013.11.003. PMID 24326214.
- Gilderbloom, J. I.; Meares, W. L.; Riggs, W. (2014). "How brownfield sites kill places and people: an examination of neighborhood housing values, foreclosures, and lifespan". Journal of Urbanism: International Research on Placemaking and Urban Sustainability. 9: 1–18. doi:10.1080/17549175.2014.905488. S2CID 143925150.

== Music ==
=== Billy Riggs Band ===
Riggs began to play as the Billy Riggs Band in 2003, and recorded and produced an album of the same name released that year. He recorded sang and performed on all of the songs on the album. In the years that followed he began to work with Dan Feeney on bass and Carlos Villarreal on drums. He also received assistance from his brother Gabriel Riggs, who plays for the band Silver Spoons, from cousin Ryan Lott, who performs as the artist SonLux, and his wife's cousin Gaurav Chopra, an accomplished singer and santoor player based in Mumbai. He released his second full-length album on June 1, 2016, entitled "Bluegrass Horseman." Two additional singles, Steal and Words, were released in late 2017 / early 2018.

=== Frances England ===
In 2005 Billy helped his cousin Frances England record the album Fascinating Creatures. Billy recorded, produced and performed on the album. The album become one of the top children's albums in 2006, was the sole recipient of the 2007 Oppenheim Platinum Award for Music and songs from it were featured on a Grammy-winning compilation. Stephan Shepherd of NPR Music called the album "one of the most adventurous children's music albums in some time, quite unlike anything out there at the moment... (Fascinating Creatures) is the start of something big, like a little secret known to only a few."

=== The Hermits and Just Visiting ===
Billy played in two bands during his high school and college years, The Hermits and Just Visiting. With Just Visiting, he performed at the National Spotlight Competition during the 1997 Dove Awards.

=== Other ===
Since 2014 Billy has been working with Dr. David Levine from UC Berkeley to write songs related to hand washing and hygiene.

== Personal life ==
Billy is married and has two children. He is an active runner and cyclist, and finished the 2005 Boston Marathon in 2:52 having come back from a 2001 Achilles tendon injury. He is said to love science fiction and wine making.
