= Rodney K. Smith =

American academic and university administrator

6th President of Southern Virginia University
- In office June 2004 – June 2011

Personal details
- Born: May 10, 1951
- Died: July 26, 2020
- Education: Western Colorado University (B.A.); J. Reuben Clark Law School (J.D.); University of Pennsylvania Law School (LL.M., S.J.D.)
- Profession: Academic administrator, law professor

Rodney K. Smith (10 May 1951 – 26 July 2020) was an American academic and the 6th president of Southern Virginia University (SVU) (2004-2011). After retiring from SVU, he served as a Distinguished Professor of Law and director of the Sports Law and Policy Center at the Thomas Jefferson School of Law (2011-2014), a Distinguished Professor of Practice and director of the Sports Law and Business Program at the Sandra Day O'Connor College of Law (2014-2016), and as the David and Laurea Stirling Professor of Constitutional Studies and director of the Center for Constitutional Studies at Utah Valley University (2016-2020).

== Biography ==
Smith was a convert to the Church of Jesus Christ of Latter-day Saints (LDS Church) and a lifelong academic. He was an undergraduate student at UC-Irvine, Georgetown University, and the Western State College of Colorado (B.A., 1973), and a graduate student at the University of Virginia, Brigham Young University (J.D., 1977), and the University of Pennsylvania (LL.M. and S.J.D).

Smith served as the dean of law schools at Capital University (1989-1994), during which time he also served as bishop of an LDS Church ward, the University of Montana (1993-1995), the University of Arkansas at Little Rock, and the University of Memphis (2003-2004).

Smith also served as a member of the board of trustees of the American Academy of Liberal Education.

Smith received honorary doctorates from Capital University (2002) and SVU (2012).

== Bibliography ==
- Public Prayer and the Constitution : A Case Study in Constitutional Interpretation
- Getting off on the Wrong Foot and Back On Again: A Reexamination of the History of the Framing of the Religion Clauses of the First Amendment and a Critique of the Reynolds and Everson Decisions
- Nonpreferentialism in Establishment Clause Analysis: A Response to Professor Laycock
- The Role of Religion in Progressive Constitutionalism
- Religion and the Press: Keeping First Amendment Values in Balance (with Patrick A. Shea)

== Notes ==
Academic offices
| Preceded by Monte S. Nyman | President of Southern Virginia University; 2004 — 2011 | Succeeded by Paul K. Sybrowsky |
