= Frances England =

American children's musician

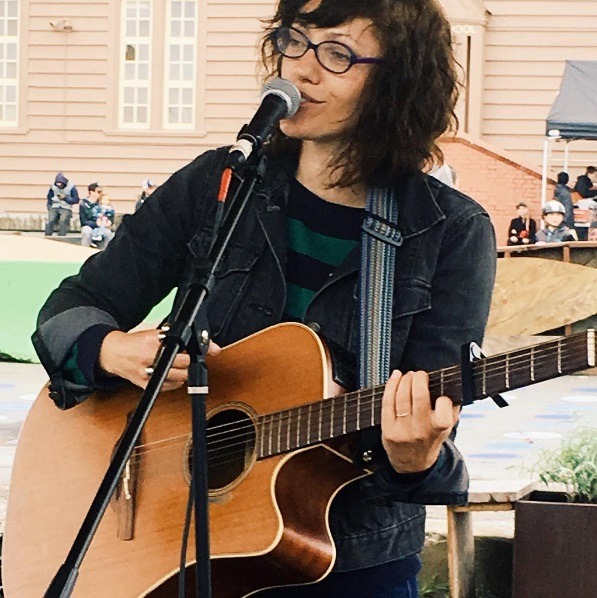
- Frances England in San Francisco, 2016

Background information
- Born: United States
- Origin: San Francisco, California, United States
- Genres: Children's, independent, folk
- Instrument(s): Voice, acoustic guitar
- Years active: 2006–present
- Website: www.francesengland.com

Frances England is an American children's musician. She is from San Francisco, California. Her style of music is generally described as indie and folk.

In 2006, England wrote her first album of songs entitled Fascinating Creatures as a fundraiser for her son's preschool and recorded it with the help of artist Billy Riggs. The album went on to be the sole recipient of the 2007 Oppenheim Platinum Award for Music. Her second CD, Family Tree (2008), received the Gold Parent's Choice Award and the Gold Nappa Award for 2008. Her third and fourth albums, Mind of My Own (2011) and Blink of an Eye (2013), also received Gold Parent's Choice Awards.

England's fifth album, Explorer of the World (2016), was awarded another Gold Parent's Choice Award, along with being ranked #1 for 2016 in the annual Fids and Kamily Music Awards, created from 2006 through 2019 by polling music critics, writers, and radio programmers. On December 6, 2016, Frances received her first Grammy nomination for Best Children's Album for Explorer of the World.

== Discography ==
- Fascinating Creatures (2006)
- Family Tree (2008)
- Mind of My Own (2010)
- Blink of an Eye (2013)
- Paths We Have Worn
- Explorer of the World (2016)
