= Monte S. Nyman =

Monte Steven Nyman (October 16, 1929 – September 30, 2011) was president of Southern Virginia University (SVU) from 2003 to 2004. He had previously been academic vice president at SVU and a professor of religion at Brigham Young University (BYU).

As a young man Nyman served a mission in the North Central States Mission of the Church of Jesus Christ of Latter-day Saints (LDS Church). Nyman received bachelor's and master's degrees in physical education from Utah State University. He later received a doctorate from BYU in educational administration. Prior to joining the BYU faculty, he was an Institute of Religion director in Edmonton, Alberta, Canada.

While at BYU, Nyman served as director of Book of Mormon studies for the Religious Studies Center and for a time he was the acting head of the ancient scripture department within the College of Religious Education.

Nyman retired from BYU in 1996. From 1999 to 2000, he was the baseball coach at SVU and later continued service at the university, first as academic vice president and then as president, before retiring in 2004.

Nyman has served in many positions in the LDS Church, including bishop and a member of the Correlation and Translation Committee. He has written several books including Great Are the Words of Isaiah, An Ensign to All People and The Most Correct Book: The Book of Mormon.

== Sources ==
- Cedar Fort author bio
- Maxwell Institute bio
- Alibris listing of works by Nyman
- Goodreads listing of works by Nyman

Academic offices
| Preceded by E. Curtis Fawson | President of Southern Virginia University; 2003 — 2004 | Succeeded by Rodney K. Smith |
