= Linda Medlar =

Linda Medlar-Jones (born 1949) was a principal figure in a high-profile political sex scandal that triggered an exhaustive 2½ year, multimillion-dollar investigation by the U.S. Office of the Independent Counsel during the first term of U.S. President Bill Clinton. The principal target of the investigation was her former lover, Housing and Urban Development secretary Henry Gabriel Cisneros of San Antonio, Texas.

The illicit relationship between Medlar and Cisneros, who were both married at the time, began in 1987 while he was Mayor of San Antonio, and she was a volunteer mayoral campaign staffer. Medlar, who according to court documents, had a long history of mental illness, secretly recorded many of her telephone conversations with Cisneros. These recordings she later sold to the television program Inside Edition for the sum $15,000. In 1994, Medlar entered a lawsuit for $250,000 against Cisneros, accusing him of fraud, breach of contract, and failure to support her. This lawsuit was settled the following year for $49,000.

Court records reveal that Medlar had received a total of US$250,000 from Cisneros between 1988 and 1992, prior to his cabinet appointment. These payments continued after Cisneros' Senate confirmation, court documents indicating that she received a total of US$79,500 in 1993 alone.

The television broadcast of transcripts of the taped conversations, as well as a televised Inside Edition interview in which Medlar charged Secretary Cisneros with lying to the Federal Bureau of Investigation, prompted U.S. Attorney General Janet Reno to call for an independent investigation. As a result of the investigation, a Washington, D.C. grand jury handed down a 21 count indictment on December 11, 1997. In the 66 page indictment entitled the UNITED STATES OF AMERICA v. HENRY G. CISNEROS, LINDA D. MEDLAR, SYLVIA ARCE-GARCIA, and JOHN D. ROSALES, Independent Counsel David Barrett brought charges against HUD Secretary Cisneros, his former mistress Medlar, and two of Cisneros’ former employees. Medlar had previously been granted immunity in exchange for her testimony against Cisneros. This was in turn revoked due to false and misleading statements on her part during the criminal investigation. Medlar was sentenced to prison. Secretary Cisneros pleaded guilty to a misdemeanor and served no jail time.

Ten years later, Medlar was convicted of bank fraud, in a scheme designed to provide her daughter with a home. She was sentenced to four years in prison, and did not appeal the sentence, saying, "I guess there's a sense of relief that this is over with. I take full responsibility for it, but at the time I didn't know it was a crime."
