= Clemente de Jesús Munguía =

Mexican Catholic prelate, lawyer, educator, and writer

The Most Reverend Clemente de Jesús Munguía
- Archbishop of Michoacán
- Church: Catholic Church
- Archdiocese: Michoacán
- Appointed: 1863
- Term ended: 14 December 1868
- Predecessor: Juan Cayetano Gómez de Portugal y Solís

Personal details
- Born: Clemente de Jesús Munguía y Núñez; 21 November 1810 Los Reyes, Michoacán, New Spain
- Died: 14 December 1868 (aged 58) Rome, Papal States
- Profession: Lawyer, educator, writer

Clemente de Jesús Munguía y Núñez (Note: In this Mexican name, the surname is Munguía and the second or maternal family name is Núñez.) (1810–1868) was a Mexican Catholic prelate, lawyer, educator, and writer who served as Bishop of Michoacán and later as the first Archbishop of Michoacán. Educated as a lawyer before becoming a priest, he was an important figure for the Mexican Catholic Church during the political and religious conflicts surrounding La Reforma in the mid-nineteenth century.

In his Memorias de mis tiempos, Guillermo Prieto described him as "lean, with a waxy yellow complexion, freckled, sagging, almost vulgar", who "looked like a sick man who had just left the hospital".

== Biography ==
Clemente de Jesús Munguía was born on 21 November 1810 in Los Reyes, Michoacán, at the start of the Mexican War of Independence. His family worked in commerce. In 1830, he installed in Morelia, where he studied law. In 1841, he studied at the Diocesan Seminary of Morelia, where he met Melchor Ocampo.

As a lawyer Munguía worked in Mexico City and Morelia. In the seminary, Munguía taught civil and canon law. He became rector, and taught Spanish language and Latin oratory.

In 1851, Munguía became Bishop of the Diocese of Michoacán. Ten years later, after expressing opposition to the Reform Laws enacted by Benito Juárez, Munguía was expelled from the country and sought refuge in Rome. There, his bishopric was promoted to an archbishopric. After the Second Mexican Empire was installed, Munguía returned to Mexico. When Emperor Maximilian was overthrown in 1867, however, he returned to Rome, where he died on 14 December 1868.

Munguía was elected a correspondent member of the Academia Mexicana de la Lengua in 1854.
