= Naval Academy Foreign Affairs Conference =

Undergraduate foreign-affairs conference in the US

- Genre: Foreign Affairs Conferences
- Venue: United States Naval Academy
- Location: Annapolis, Maryland
- Country: United States
- Attendance: 150+ Undergraduates
- Website: http://usna.edu/NAFAC/

The Naval Academy Foreign Affairs Conference (NAFAC) is an undergraduate foreign-affairs conference in the United States. NAFAC seeks to explore current, demanding issues from both a civilian and military perspective, thus provide a forum for addressing pressing international concerns. Held at the United States Naval Academy in Annapolis, Maryland since 1961, NAFAC brings together Naval Academy students and their civilian and military counterparts from around the world to share ideas and concerns relating to international affairs. Past speakers include: George H. W. Bush, Joseph Biden, Stephen Hadley, Madeleine Albright, Condoleezza Rice, Robert Gates, Wesley Clark, Charles Krauthammer, Sheryl Sandberg and Hillary Clinton.

== Structure ==
Each year a theme is chosen for NAFAC; individuals with expertise in relevant fields are invited to address the conference delegates representing colleges and universities from across the United States and around the world. Conference attendees bring approaches that, through discussion and interaction, are intended to enlighten the thinking of their peers.

The entire conference is organized and run by the United States Naval Academy Midshipmen. These future officers of the Navy and the Marine Corps also serve as moderators, presenters, and as a minority percentage of delegates.

Harvard University and the United States Senior Military Colleges are examples of schools with annual partnerships to sponsor delegates to NAFAC.

NAFAC has a reciprocal exchange partnership with the MSC Student Conference on National Affairs at Texas A&M University, which was founded in 1955. A Naval Academy Professor, United States Army Colonel Rocco Paone, served as a facilitator in 1962 for MSC SCONA 8 immediately after founding NAFAC and thereby a partnership lasting into the present day.

== NAFAC topics ==
- 1961 - Founding year
- 1996 - A New Multilaterlism
- 1997 - The Struggle for Democracy
- 1998 - Asia Rising?
- 1999 - Keeping Peace
- 2000 - Civil-Military Relations
- 2001 - Terrorism
- 2002 - Central and Southwest Asia
- 2003 - Strangers in a Common Land: Preserving Israel and Palestine
- 2004 - Post-War Reconstruction: Iraq
- 2005 - Power and Purpose: Defining America's Role in the World
- 2006 - Africa: Turning Attention into Action
- 2007 - Asia At The Crossroads
- 2008 - Latin America
- 2009 - Bridging the Gap: Combatting Global Poverty
- 2010 - National Security Beyond the Horizon: Changing Threats in a Changing World
- 2011 - People, Power, and Politics in the Internet Age
- 2012 - The Eclipse of the West?
- 2013 - Time of Transition
- 2014 - Human Security in the Information Age
- 2015 - Sustainability and Sovereignty: Global Security in a Resource-Strained World
- 2016 - Women and Security: The Implications of Promoting Global Gender Equality
- 2017- A New Era of Great Power Competition?
- 2018 - Guarding Liberty in a World of Democratic Undoing
- 2019 - Coming Apart: The Fate of the Rules-based Order
- 2020 - War, Peace, and the Gray Zone
- 2021 - Global Resilience after the Pandemic
- 2022 - Partnership in the 21st Century
- 2023 - Democracies Divided: The Proliferation of Polarization
- 2024 - Where Power Lies: The Development of Civil-Military Relations in a New World Order
