= Elvira Cisneros =

Elvira Cisneros (née Munguia; July 11, 1924 – November 22, 2014) was an activist and community leader. Born in Puebla, Mexico on July 11, 1924, her family immigrated to San Antonio in 1926. She married George Cisneros on November 25, 1945, and the couple had five children: Henry, Pauline, George Jr., Tim, and Cristina. Her oldest son Henry, served 8 years (1981–1989) as the mayor of San Antonio and would also serve as the Secretary of Housing and Urban Development in the Clinton administration.

== Early life and education ==
Elvira Munguia was born in Puebla, Mexico on July 11, 1924 to Romulo Munguia and Carolina (Malpica) Munguia. She was the fourth of seven children. After immigrating from Mexico to San Antonio in 1926, Romulo secured a job with the Spanish language newspaper La Prensa. The family soon followed him to San Antonio. Romulo eventually opened Munguia Printers, “a family owned business that became a central place for political activism”. Her mother became one of the first female Mexican radio personalities on the West Side of San Antonio. Elvira began her lifelong devotion to her culture when, as a child, she assisted her parents as they established parent teacher organizations, community newspapers, and in their radio programs which centered on Mexican literature and culture. Elvira and her six siblings were raised in the Prospect Hill area of San Antonio's West side where, in elementary school, Elvira went to Sacred Heart School. She left parochial school for Washington Irving Junior High, and went on to graduate from Jefferson High School. While at Jefferson High School she was on the archery team and she danced Mexican folklorico with the cultural club, Seleni, sponsored by the Mexican Consulate. After high school, Elvira moved to Austin, Texas, to attend the University of Texas at Austin. During this time, WWII was underway and Elvira's three older brothers enlisted in the military. Elvira returned to San Antonio to help with the family business. While back in San Antonio tending to her family, Elvira studied at Draughon's Business College and enhanced her bookkeeping skills working at her family's print shop. After Draughon, she started a job at Frost Bank in downtown San Antonio.

== Marriage & family ==
During Elvira's tenure at Frost Bank, she spent her evenings at nearby Santa Rosa Hospital caring for her younger brother, Henry, who wound up passing away from Hodgkins disease in 1943, at age 14. She also helped care for her youngest sister, Stella, who was afflicted by, and died from, polio.

Through her brother Ruben, who was stationed at Randolph Field, Elvira met George Cisneros, who was a fellow World War II combat veteran stationed in San Antonio. The two eventually married on November 25, 1945 and had 5 children together: Henry (1947), Pauline (1949), George Jr. (1952), Tim (1957), and Christina (1960). Her oldest son, Henry, served 8 years (1981–1989) as the mayor of San Antonio and would also serve as the Secretary of Housing and Urban Development in the Clinton administration.

== Later life and legacy ==
Elvira and George founded the Alamo Area Stroke Support Group in 1977 to promote awareness and support for afflicted families after George suffered stroke. She also aided George in his efforts as the national spokesperson for Easter Seals. In 1991 Elvira was inducted into the San Antonio Women's Hall of Fame for her civic leadership.

Cisneros spent her later years as board member and advisor for many civic minded groups, including: Avenida Guadalupe Association, AVANCE, Project Learn to Read, and the Alamo Area Council of Governments. As a result of her dedication to, and advocacy for, the elderly, WellMed Charitable Foundation named a community center for her. The Elvira Cisneros Senior Community Center provides activities for over 6,500 members.
