= Carolina Malpica Munguía =

Educator and community activist in San Antonio, Texas (b. 1891, d. 1977)

Carolina Malpica Munguía (January 14, 1891 – May 25, 1977) was an educator and community activist in San Antonio, Texas, United States. Munguía founded the "Círculo Social Femenino, México" (Women's Social Circle, Mexico) in order to help Mexican and Mexican-American women. She was the first Mexican woman to host a radio program in San Antonio.

== Early life and career ==
Carolina Malpica Munguía was born in Puebla, Mexico, on January 14, 1891. Her father, Patricio Malpica, was a widower. Munguía was sent to the Instituto Normal Metodista (Methodist Normal School) to be educated, despite her being a Roman Catholic. At the institute, Carolina trained as a teacher and graduated in 1911. After graduating, Munguía worked in an elementary school in Mexico. While working at the school, Munguía attended graduate classes in English and soon became the principal at a Methodist School in Orizaba, Veracruz. During the Mexican Revolution, the Methodist School Munguía was employed at was closed, leading Munguía to found her school in her hometown of Puebla. The school, operated by Munguía, focused on education for fourth and fifth-grade students before its closure. She later became the primary school supervisor for the city of Puebla.

Munguía's career as an educator ended when she married José Rómulo Munguía Torres in 1916. The couple had seven children and remained married until their deaths. Due to Munguía's husband's controversial status as a revolutionary, the family was exiled from Mexico and moved to San Antonio, Texas, U.S., in 1926.

== Later career and activism ==
In 1932, Munguía became the first Mexican woman to have her own radio show in San Antonio. Her show, La Estrella, aired on station KONO and promoted Mexican culture in San Antonio through Mexican music and literature. After the success of the radio program, Munguía helped her husband establish his own printing business in the 1930s called Munguía Printers. In her early years in San Antonio, Munguía taught Spanish at the Wesleyan Institute, which later became Trinity University. During this time she washed and shelled pecans in the Munguía home.

After finding economic stability for her family, Munguía decided to become an activist for the Mexican community La Raza in San Antonio. On June 12, 1938, she started "Círculo Social Femenino, México" ("Women's Social Circle, Mexico"), later renamed as "Circulo Cultural; Isabel La Catolica" ("Cultural Circle; Isabel the Catholic"). Círculo Social Femenino was designed to help lower-middle-class and working-class Mexican and Mexican-American women. The slogan for the organization was Toda por la patria y el hogar ("All for country and home"), designed around the revitalization of the Mexican and Mexican-American community. Circulo Cultural participated in many community projects, such as taking in donations for the poor, celebrating Mexican holidays, volunteering at the Mexican Consulate and Clinic, organizing cultural events, and raising money for community outreach. Munguía provided two Mexican lawyers to answer legal questions from members of the organization. The Circulo Cultural was active for 16 months and disbanded in the early 1940s. In 1938 she also started participating in the Asociación de la Biblioteca Mexicana (Association of the Mexican Library), which was a project of the Mexican Consulate.

After serving as a secretary of the Crockett Latin American Parent-Teachers Association, Munguía became the Spanish-speaking PTA president in 1938, which allowed Spanish-speaking parents to bring concerns and ideas to the teachers in order to improve student education. It was during the Great Depression, so students were going to school hungry, dirty, poorly clothed, sick or injured. To meet students' basic needs, a dining room was opened, showers installed, sewing circles organized, and medical attention was given to the students. Munguía met additional needs through the "Home of Neighborly Service Center" which fed children and had Mexican-American barbers who gave the children free haircuts. During her tenure at Crockett, she had the Spanish-Speaking PTA raise money for clothes and shoes for the students and create Christmas baskets for their families. In 1940 and 1941 she moved up in the organization and became the head of the Spanish-Speaking Department of the San Antonio PTA Council in District 5. In this position, she oversaw all of the Spanish-Speaking PTAs in the district, gave speeches at seven schools, participated in Executive PTA Board meetings, founded a Spanish-Speaking PTA chapter at T. J. Brackenridge Elementary, and presented at the PTA state convention to showcase work done by Spanish-speaking students. She then joined the American Red Cross because four of her sons were fighting in World War II.

In 1952 Munguía helped her husband start a cross-cultural community organization called "El Patronato" (The Board) to support extension courses offered by the National Autonomous University of Mexico (UNAM) in San Antonio. Rómulo Munguía served as the first president of the organization whose members included both Mexican-Americans and Caucasians. The continued efforts of El Patronato eventually led to the establishment of a satellite campus of UNAM in San Antonio in 1972.

== Later life and legacy ==
Later in life, Munguía was active in the Basilica of the National Shrine of the Little Flower, which was devoted to St. Thérese of Lisieux. She was the grandmother of Henry Cisneros, who became the first Mexican-American mayor of San Antonio. She died on May 25, 1977, in San Antonio.
