= Barrett Report =

U.S. special counsel

The Barrett Report is a 400-page report created by special prosecutor David Barrett. Initially tasked with investigating allegations of lying to the FBI against Henry Cisneros, Secretary of the U.S Department of Housing and Urban Development under U.S. President Bill Clinton, the investigation eventually delved into allegations that President Clinton had used the U.S. Department of Justice and the Internal Revenue Service as political tools against American citizens. The investigation lasted ten years and cost nearly $21 million. It resulted in one misdemeanor conviction against Cisneros and developed information that led to a prison term for his former mistress, Linda Medlar Jones, on an unrelated bank fraud charge.

Before the release of the report, three Democratic U.S. Senators, John Kerry, Dick Durbin and Byron Dorgan, forced the redaction of certain pages by attaching a rider to an unrelated appropriations bill.

Cisneros, a former San Antonio mayor, eventually pleaded guilty to a misdemeanor charge of lying to the FBI. He paid a US$10,000 fine and was pardoned by President Clinton on Clinton's final day in office.

== See also ==
- Henry Cisneros payments controversy
