= Center for Housing Policy =

The Center for Housing Policy, the research affiliate of the US National Housing Conference (NHC), works to broaden understanding of the nation's housing challenges and to examine the impact of policies and programs developed to address these needs. Combining research and practical, real-world expertise, the Center helps to develop effective policy solutions at the local, state and national levels that increase the availability of affordable homes.

Jeffrey Lubell is the executive director of the center. John McIlwain, senior resident fellow at the Urban Land Institute and ULI/J. Ronald Terwilliger chair for housing, is chairman of the center.

Maureen Friar is president and CEO of NHC. Dan Nissenbaum, chief operating officer of the Urban Investment Group, a division of Goldman Sachs Bank USA, is chair of NHC.

== History ==
The center began operations in 1992. Starting in the late 1990s, the center's research has focused on the housing challenges of working families through a series of studies and online resource guides.

== Primary research goals ==
The center has four primary research goals:

1. Expanding awareness of the nation's housing needs
2. Identifying proven and promising solutions to the nation's housing challenges
3. Working to ensure a better understanding of the role that housing plays in advancing key societal goals
4. Laying the foundation for the next generation of housing and related policies
