= Millennial Housing Commission =

The Millennial Housing Commission was created by Congress in 2000 as part of the FY 2000 Appropriations legislation. The Commission was directed by Congress to conduct a study that examines the importance of housing, particularly affordable housing, to the infrastructure of the United States and explore the possible methods for increasing the role of the private sector in providing affordable housing. The 22 commissioners appointed to this task were drawn from across the country and from across the spectrum of housing ideologies and experience. Susan Molinari and Richard Ravitch served as co-chairs of the Commission. Conrad Egan, president and CEO of the National Housing Conference, served as executive director of the Commission.
