= John Gilderbloom =

John "Hans" Gilderbloom
- Born: October , 1952; San Mateo, California, U.S.
- Education: University of California, Santa Barbara (B.A., 1975; M.A. 1978; Ph.D., 1983)
- Known for: Rent control Urban renewal Community organizing Homeless advocacy Livable cities Community organizing Climate change Reversing climate change Free speech
- Scientific career
- Fields: Housing, Green Cities
- Workplaces: University of Louisville; Center for Sustainable Urban Neighborhoods
- Website: https://gilderbloom.org/ http://sun.louisville.edu https://chromatichomes.com/

John "Hans" Gilderbloom is a Dutch American community organizer, academic, author, and researcher. He works as an international consultant on creating livable neighborhoods and cities, owns a real estate company that renovates historic housing, and has taught at the University of California, Santa Barbara, University of Wisconsin–Green Bay, University of Houston, and the University of Louisville, where he was a Professor of Economics at the School of Business, Public Health, Sustainability, Planning, Public Administration, and Urban and Public Affairs for 37 years. In 2014, he was nominated as a Fellow of the Scholars Strategy Network housed at Harvard University. He has been ranked as one of the "top 100 urban thinkers in the world."

== Early life and education ==
Gilderbloom was born in San Mateo, California to parents Murray Edward Gilderbloom (Dutch Gelderblom) and Jeanette Lauder Gilderbloom.

He grew up in San Francisco in a creative environment of writers and musicians. His godfather was Dave Lewis, a Stanford University writing professor who was the co-author of Klute, which won an Academy Award for Best Picture in 1970. Mark Dowie, former publisher and editor of Mother Jones, was a frequent Sunday guest for family meals. His uncle, Clarence W. Gilderbloom, was a respected inventor involved in developing patents for early versions of the dishwasher and a motorized Lazy Boy recliner. Another influential relative, Gilderbloom's distant cousin Hanneke Gelderblom, was featured in the documentary Sex, Drugs, and Democracy. She was elected a Senator in the Netherlands and worked at the International Court of Justice.

Gilderbloom received his B.A. (1975), M.A. (1978), and Ph.D. (1983) in Sociology from the University of California, Santa Barbara. He graduated with the highest GPA in his graduating class (1975) with a straight A average. While at UCSB, he took classes from and was mentored by Harvey Molotch, Richard Appelbaum, and took classes from David Harvey (who stayed with him while teaching at UCSB), Christopher Jencks, W. Dennis Keating, Michael Teitz, Jürgen Habermas, Roger Friedland, William Bielby, and William Domhoff.

== Community organizer ==
In high school, Gilderbloom worked with protest groups against the Vietnam War, for environmental awareness following the Santa Barbara Oil Spill, and Cesar Chavez in the local Grape Boycott.

In the 1970s, Gilderbloom organized several local, state and national tenant organizations including the California Housing Action and Information Network to help pass rent control laws and other tenant protections. The Foundation for National Progress (Mother Jones) published an organizing manual, Rent Control: A Source Book which was adopted by the emerging tenant movement in the 1980s. Orange County's The Register called it the "Bible" of the rent control movement and it received both praise and attacks from The Nation, The New York Times, and The Wall Street Journal. He later published a book, Community Versus Commodity: Tenants and the American City on the renters movement with Stella Capek.

Gilderbloom himself has experienced the landlords' wrath. He was advised to halt his study several times. "You'll never survive to finish your work," one industry lobbyist warned him. In another instance, a real estate agent wrote one of the Governor's aides that: "We must find a way to neutralize him [Gilderbloom]." Gilderbloom worked with Mitch Snyder, founder of the National Coalition for the Homeless, to block President Ronald Reagan from prohibiting federal funds to cities who have enacted rent control. He co-authored a study demonstrating that rent control was not correlated with increases in the homeless population, refuting William Tucker's research. President Reagan's proposal was defeated in Congress.

Later Gilderbloom began work in poor neighborhoods to develop affordable, accessible, and attractive housing. He writes about his struggles in Promise and Betrayal: Universities and the Battle for Sustainable Urban Neighborhoods.

== Academic career ==
Gilderbloom was a professor in the Department of Urban and Public Affairs at University of Louisville for 37 years. His research interests include research methods, statistics, housing, community development, planning and design. Gilderbloom is also the Director of the Center for Sustainable Urban Neighborhoods, a research center that explores ways to create more sustainable communities. He is a frequent collaborator with Dr. William (Billy) Riggs from University of San Francisco.

Gilderbloom has written and edited eight books and countless articles on issues concerning rental housing, poverty, health, community development, and urban policy. His work includes, 68 peer-reviewed publications (including several in Journal of Urban Affairs), 30 book chapters, eight authored or co-authored books or journals, and [...] op-ed pieces in Wall Street Journal, Washington Post, Los Angeles Times, Chicago Sun-Times, USA Today Magazine, Governing Magazine, American Banker, Courier Journal, and many other outlets." His book Rethinking Rental Housing was called "[T]he most significant piece on housing policy written in the last 40 years" by Daniel Lauber, past President of the American Planning Association. A National Housing Institute Survey of Books in Housing Courses found Rethinking Rental Housing to be the most widely chosen book in college housing courses. He later updated the book with new chapters and new numbers called: Invisible City: Housing, Poverty, and New Urbanism. Additionally, Gilderbloom contributed a chapter on modern Cuban architecture for the Encyclopedia of 20th-Century Architecture which won Planetizen's top ten best books in planning for 2005 and a chapter on the history of rent strikes for the Encyclopedia of Housing, 2nd edition, which won best reference book award from American Library Association. Gilderbloom has been consulted by several countries for his work, including Russia, Cuba, Venezuela, Mexico, the Netherlands, and Spain.

== Other work ==
=== Neighborhood revitalization ===
Gilderbloom runs a successful consulting business and has contributed his expertise on numerous neighborhood revitalization projects in West Louisville, Newport (KY), Covington (KY), and Southern Indiana worth over $100 million. His work has been featured in The New York Times. The East Russel Partnership, a collaboration between local organizations; city, state, and federal government; and the Center for Sustainable Urban Neighborhoods received the Sierra Club's Best Practices Award, given for smart growth projects for their success in West Louisville. He has also worked with cities to produce "green housing developments" in Louisville, Indianapolis, Muncie, IN; Covington, KY; and Newport, KY.

=== Real estate ===
Gilderbloom has restored 25 historic homes in Louisville, Houston, Green Bay, and currently in Scottsdale and Phoenix as a part of his business, one of which has been featured in The New York Times and been the set of the movie The Song. His homes are restored using principles of green design.

== Recognitions and achievements ==
Gilderbloom's research has earned him numerous awards and recognition throughout his career. His largest recognition was an international survey of planners and city officials of the Top 100 Urban Thinkers poll conducted by Planetizen, where he was ranked as 63 (placing him in the top forty for living urban thinkers). Additionally, he was chosen as one of the select few academics to be a commentator in Politico's "Arena." He was awarded by the University of Louisville the Presidential Medal for Distinguished Faculty in Research and Creative Activity (2013). In 1997 he was awarded honorary membership in the Phi Kappa Phi for his "outstanding research and character".

In 1982 Gilderbloom received the American Planning Association Chapter Award for Outstanding Contribution to Planning for his research on inter-city rent differentials and housing policy analysis. A year later in 1983, Gilderbloom received the Douglas A. McGregor Memorial Award for Outstanding Social Science from the Journal of Applied Behavioral Science for his research paper "Housing Supply and Regulation: A Study of Rental Housing Market", co-written with Dr. Richard Appelbaum.

His work on rent control includes two books, eight scholarly articles, and numerous op-eds in publications including The Wall Street Journal and The Los Angeles Times, making him one of the most outspoken scholars on rent control.

He was previously starred in the film Rubbertown.

He is currently working on a documentary film which hopes to get wide distribution in classrooms.

== Selected publications ==
- Climate Chaos: Killing People, Places, and the Planet (edited by John Hans Gilderbloom, 2025, Lexington Press, New York, New York)
- Chromatic Homes: A Design & Coloring Book (John I. "Hans" Gilderbloom. 2019. University Press of Kentucky)
- Chromatic Homes: The Joy of Color in Historic Places (written by John I. "Hans" Gilderbloom. 2018. University Press of Kentucky)
- Series Urban Degradation and Public Health for Praeger Books. Including: 2017 “America’s Addiction to the Automobile” by Chad Frederick. Santa Barbara, CA Praeger Publishing House (John Gilderbloom editorial director of book series on Public Health and Urban Toxins)
- Sustain: Special Issue: Alternative Transportation Guest Editor John I. Gilderbloom and Wesley Meares in Sustain: A Journal of Environmental and Sustainability Issues. University of Louisville: Kentucky Institute for Sustainable Development 2012 (26) Spring/Summer
- Sustain: Special Issue: Sustainable Communities: The Ideal City Guest Editor with Matt Hanka. Sustain: A Journal of Environmental and Sustainability Issues. University of Louisville: Kentucky Institute for Sustainable Development 2010 (29) Fall/ Winter 2010, pages 1–47
- Invisible City: Housing, Poverty and New Urbanism (by John I. Gilderbloom. Austin, TX: University of Texas Press, Winter 2008, pages 1–263)
- Sustain: Special Issue: International Sustainability: Edited by John Gilderbloom. Sustain: A Journal of Environmental and Sustainability Issues. University of Louisville: Kentucky Institute for Sustainable Development. Special Editor for Fall/Winter 2005, Issue 11
- Promise and Betrayal: The University and the Battle for Sustainable Urban Neighborhoods. 2008. Albany, New York: State University New York Press)
- Community Versus Commodity: Tenants and the American City (written by Stella Capek and John I. Gilderbloom. Albany: SUNY Press)
- Rethinking Rental Housing (by John I. Gilderbloom and Richard Appelbaum. 1988 Phil.: Temple Univ. Press (first Printing December 1987 hard cover; second printing February 1988 soft cover; third printing May 1989 soft cover)
- Rent Control: A Source Book (edited by John I. Gilderbloom. 1981 San Francisco: Foundation for National Progress, Housing Information Center (First Printing December 1979; Second Printing June 1981; Third Printing July 1982)
