= MSC Student Conference on National Affairs =

Texas A&M University annual conference

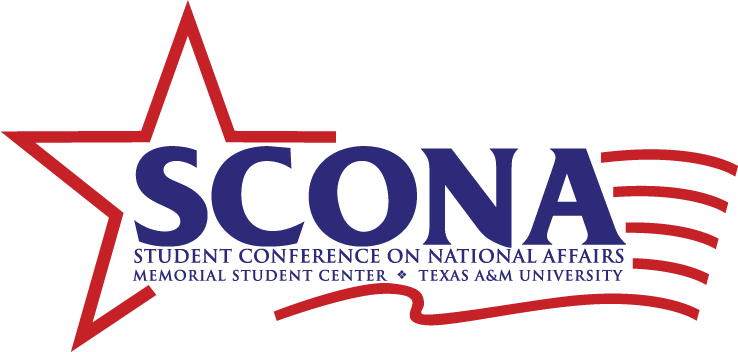
- Genre: Foreign Affairs Conferences
- Venue: Campus of Texas A&M University
- Location: College Station, Texas
- Country: United States
- Attendance: 150 delegates from 30+ Universities
- Website: scona.tamu.edu

The MSC Student Conference on National Affairs (MSC SCONA) is an annual conference at Texas A&M University where students and military cadets from across Texas and the United States gather to exchange ideas and discuss the role of the United States in the global community. The most recent conference, MSC SCONA 71, was held in February 2026.

== History ==
MSC SCONA was founded in 1955 by John Jenkins '56 and Bud Whitney '56, senior students in the Texas A&M University Corps of Cadets, after they had attended the 6th Student Conference on United States Affairs (SCUSA) at the United States Military Academy at West Point. Jenkins and Whitney sought to bring students from across the South to a similar conference held at Texas A&M to allow those students to engage in a world-class national affairs conference closer to home.

MSC SCONA 1's keynote speaker was United States Army Major General William J. Donovan, founder of the World War II-era Office of Strategic Services that later became the Central Intelligence Agency. The highest-ranking military officer to speak at an MSC SCONA conference was in 2015 with then-Chairman of the Joint Chiefs of Staff General Martin Dempsey, United States Army. The most prestigious civilian was then-Vice President of the United States Lyndon B. Johnson of Texas for SCONA 8.

== Organization and Partnerships ==
=== Structure ===
MSC SCONA develops an overarching topic to guide discussions, anchor policy proposals, and inspire the conference speakers and facilitators annually. The approximately 150 delegates represent universities across the United States, including all Federal Service Academies, the six United States Senior Military Colleges, and top schools across the Southeastern Conference, among other prestigious institutions.

Although MSC SCONA once included delegates from local high schools and countries such as Mexico and Canada, both practices have since been discontinued due to funding issues in the 1990s and a focus on a more rigorous standard of discussions. Since at least as far back as the time of SCONA Finance Chairman Henry Cisneros, later the Secretary of the United States Department of Housing and Urban Development, committee members have traveled to major cities across Texas to raise private funds from businesses and individuals to operate the conference.

The conference is organized and run by a committee of Texas A&M University students. These students, many of them from the Texas A&M University Corps of Cadets and the Texas A&M Bush School of Government and Public Service, serve as delegates, roundtable hosts, conference staff members and the executive leadership. MSC SCONA became racially integrated as a conference in 1961 at the behest of a famous speaker, then-Vice President of the United States Lyndon B. Johnson. This was several years before the host university would follow suit under President James Earl Rudder.

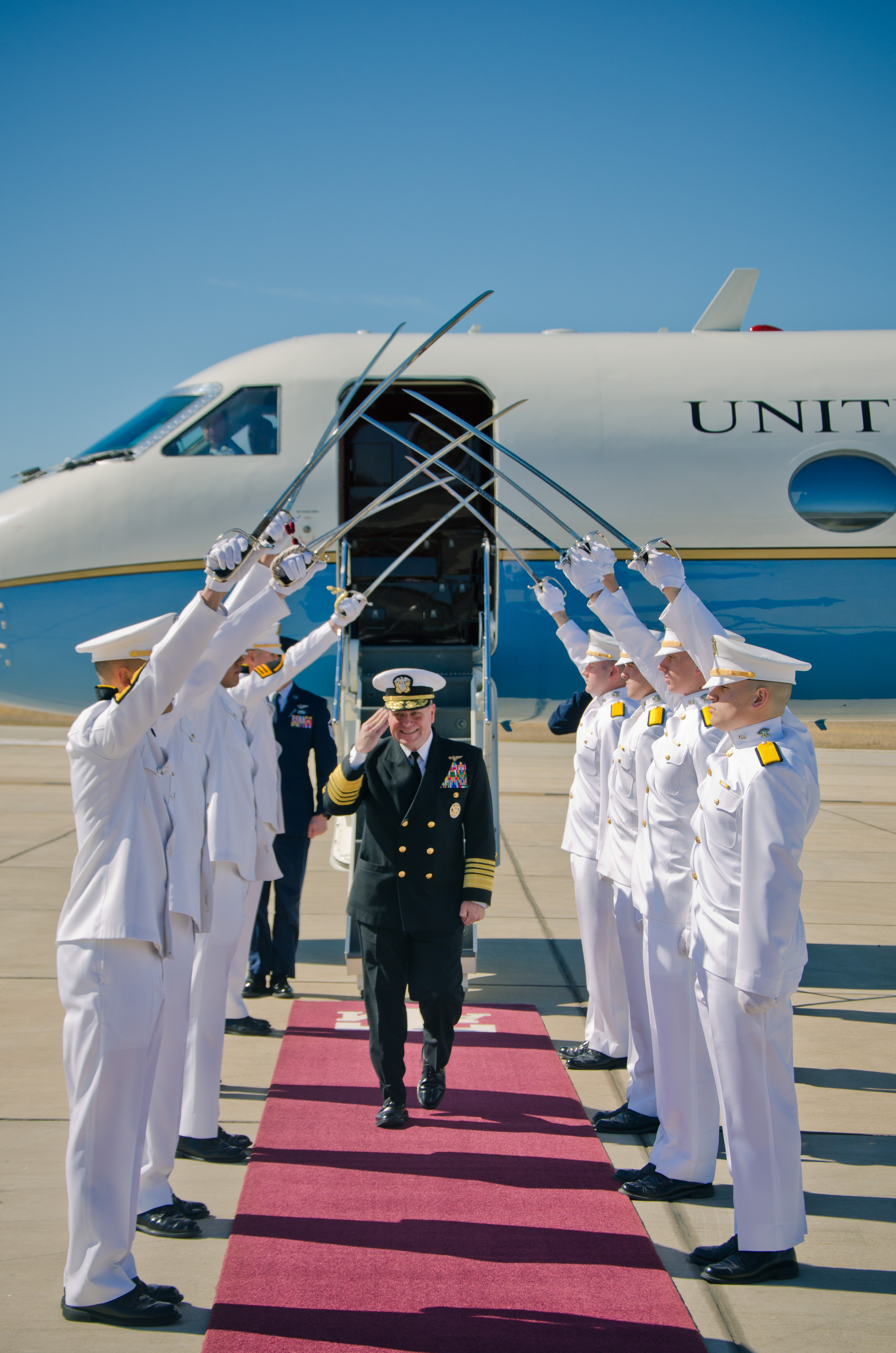
Admiral William E. Gortney, U.S. Northern Command and NORAD commander, salutes the Texas A&M Ross Volunteers upon arrival for the 61st MSC SCONA Conference in 2016.

=== Strategic partnerships ===
MSC SCONA has a partnership with the Student Conference on U.S. Affairs (SCUSA) at the United States Military Academy and the Naval Academy Foreign Affairs Conference at the United States Naval Academy. At SCONA 8, one of the roundtable facilitators was U.S. Army Colonel Rocco M. Paone, the founding director of NAFAC. Although professors from Texas A&M and other schools often serve as facilitators, only SCONA 36 on the future of European integration has received scholarly notice.

Since 2011, MSC SCONA has partnered with the United States Army War College to hold a pre-conference exercise called the International Strategic Crisis Negotiation Exercise (ISCNE). In previous years, this experience has focused on international conflicts like those in the Nagorno-Karabakh region (2018) and the contested island of Cyprus. This exercise is also held at approximately a dozen government and public service graduate schools nationwide. MSC SCONA remains the only student-led and organized version of the ISCNE program.

The Texas A&M Bush School of Government and Public Service and MSC SCONA have a long-standing relationship beyond student leadership to include speakers such as former Bush School Dean Amb. Ryan Crocker spoke at SCONA 56 in 2011 and SCONA 61 in 2016. Ambassador Napper, a Bush School professor, has also led in executing the ISCNE.

In 2017, United States Army officers and civilian staff modified the ISCNE exercise and rebranded it as the Domestic Crisis Strategic Response Exercise (DCSRE) to better complement SCONA 62's topic of homeland security. Speakers at SCONA 62 included Commandant of the United States Marine Corps General Robert Neller, Director of the National Security Agency Admiral Michael S. Rogers, USN, Director of Los Alamos National Laboratory Charles F. McMillan, and Islamic reformer Dr. Tawfik Hamid.
