= National Housing Conference =

American non-profit organization based in Washington, D.C.

Established	1931
President and CEO	David M. Dworkin
Chair	Ali Solis
Headquarters	Washington, D.C., USA
Homepage	www.nhc.org

The National Housing Conference (NHC) is an American non-profit organization based in Washington, D.C. established in 1931.

== History ==
In 1931, Mary Kingsbury Simkhovitch, a reformer and social worker, formed the National Public Housing Conference, which became the National Housing Conference (NHC), the first non-partisan, independent coalition of national housing leaders from both the public and private sector. Simkhovitch believed that imaginative programs could replace slums with decent housing and revive the creative spirit of a community. In 1933, NHC, then the National Public Housing Conference convinced the Roosevelt Administration to include affordable housing in the National Industrial Recovery Act, and helped engineer the passage of the National Housing Act of 1934, which created the Federal Housing Administration (FHA).

NHC's efforts in the 1950s and 1960s helped secure the expansion of the Housing Act of 1949 in 1954, which included authorization of slum clearance and permitted rent adjustments based on income. Part of Lyndon B. Johnson’s “Great Society” included the creation of the U.S. Department of Housing and Urban Development (HUD) in 1965, a cabinet level department with decent housing as its only goal.

In 1973, Clara Fox, executive director of the Settlement Housing Fund, organized developers, lenders, builders, property managers, residents and others interested in affordable housing into a powerful coalition to fight President Richard Nixon’s actions to limit federal housing programs. The following year, this coalition, the New York Housing Conference (NYHC), affiliated with NHC. Fox served as co-chair of NYHC until her death in December 2007.

After Presidents Gerald Ford and Jimmy Carter authorized record high budgets for HUD in the 1970s, the election of Ronald Reagan in 1982 led to drastic housing budget cuts. Despite the reluctance of the Reagan Administration, NHC successfully lobbied for Low-Income Housing Tax Credit legislation, which gave private investors a 10-year tax incentive to invest in affordable housing by providing equity for multi-family housing with a designated number of units for low-income tenants. This remains the most important incentive for financing low-income housing.

In 1992, President Bill Clinton’s new HUD administration approached NHC for help in determining how best to preserve the 940,000 Section 8 program units facing defaults. NHC convened a special task force numbering over 110 industry leaders from all different sectors of the housing industry. The coalition drafted a proposal that resulted in “Mark to Market” legislation, helping to preserve hundreds of thousands of rental units. Also in 1992, NHC created the Center for Housing Policy, an affiliated housing research organization dedicated to conducting practical and relevant research for housing practitioners and policymakers. Jeffrey Lubell served as executive director of the center. The Center was closed in 2017 when its research function was transferred back to NHC.

== Leadership ==
David M. Dworkin serves as president and CEO of NHC and Ali Solis is the chair of the Board of Governors.
