= Reed N. Wilcox =

Reed N. Wilcox was the president of Southern Virginia University (SVU) from 2014 to 2023.

Previously, Wilcox was involved in the pharmaceuticals industry. He has consulted in many places throughout the US, and has also at times lived abroad in China, Japan, France and Ghana. He served as president of the France Toulouse Mission for the Church of Jesus Christ of Latter-day Saints.

Wilcox has a bachelor's degree from Brigham Young University and a JD/MBA from Harvard University.

Wilcox also previously ran a company called the Lifelike Toy Company, based near Denver, Colorado, with Mitt Romney on the board.

On October 13, 2023, it was announced that Wilcox would be succeeded by Bonnie H. Cordon as the president of SVU, effective immediately.
