= Political hip-hop =

Subgenre of hip-hop music

Political hip hop
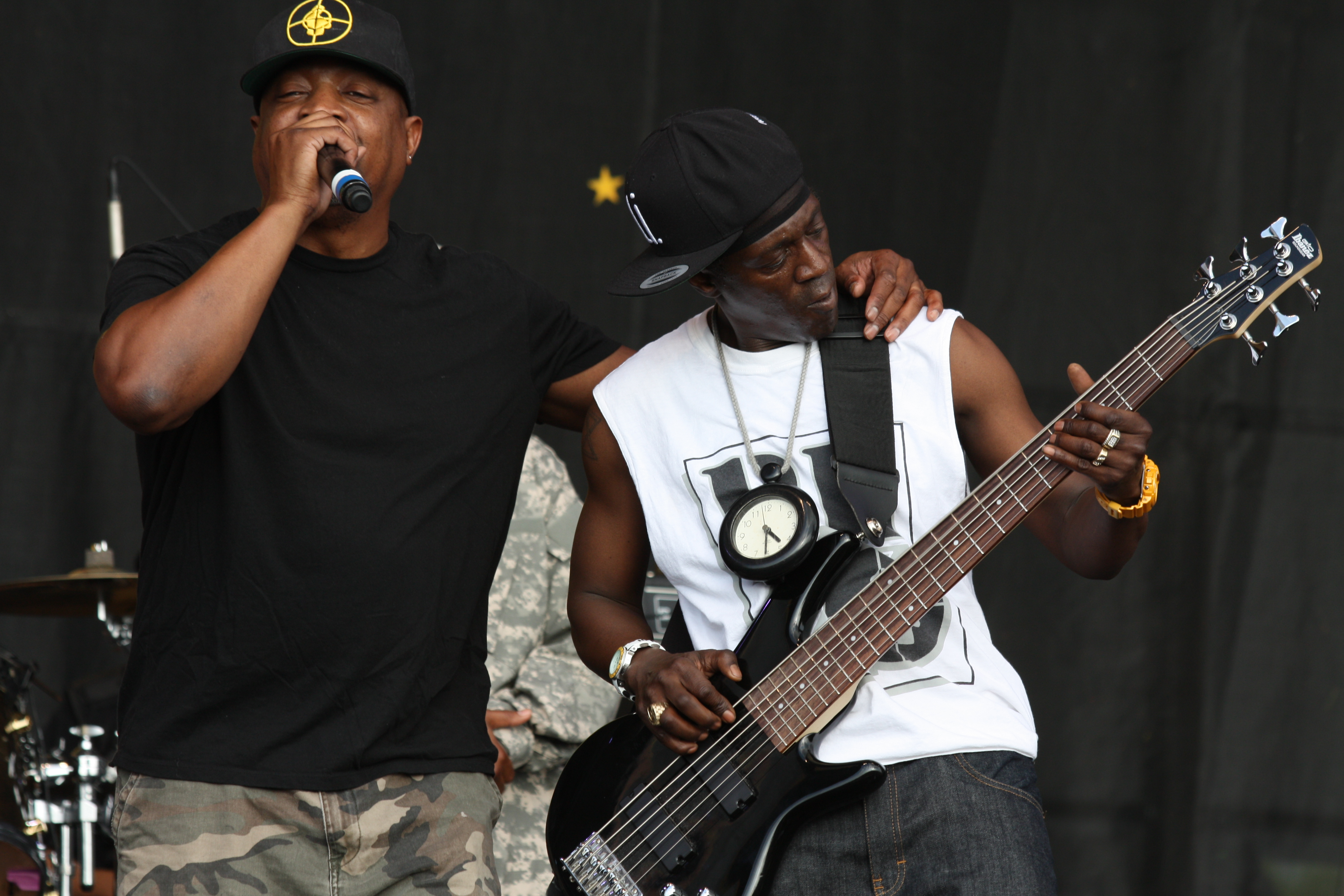
- Public Enemy's Chuck D and Flavor Flav
- Other names: Conscious hip-hop; Political rap
- Stylistic origins: Hip-hop; protest songs
- Cultural origins: 1980s
- Derivative forms: Conscious hip-hop

Other topics
- List of artists; progressive rap; alternative rap; gangsta rap; hardcore hip-hop

Political hip hop (also known as political rap and conscious hip-hop) is a subgenre of hip hop music that emerged in the 1980s as a form of political expression and activism. It typically addresses sociopolitical issues through lyrics, aiming to inspire action, promote social change, or convey specific political viewpoints. The genre draws inspiration from earlier politically conscious artists, such as The Last Poets and Gil Scott-Heron, as well as movements like the Black Power movement and the Black Panther Party from the 1960s and 1970s.

Notable early political hip hop artists include KRS-One and Boogie Down Productions, as well as Public Enemy, both of whom were influential in establishing political rap in the late 1980s with albums that addressed social and political concerns. Other artists, often labeled as part of the "conscious rap" movement, such as X-Clan, Poor Righteous Teachers, Paris, and Disposable Heroes of Hiphoprisy, followed in subsequent years, expanding the genre's focus on political messages.

The genre has long been intertwined with political activism, providing a platform for artists to address issues such as police brutality, racism, corruption, and economic inequality. Some well-known examples of politically charged hip hop songs include: "The Message" (1982), "Fight the Power" (1989), "Fuck tha Police" (1989), "Changes" (1998), "Mosh" (2004), "Minority Report" (2006), "The Blacker the Berry" (2015), "Snow on Tha Bluff" (2020), and "The Bigger Picture" (2020).

== Conscious hip-hop ==
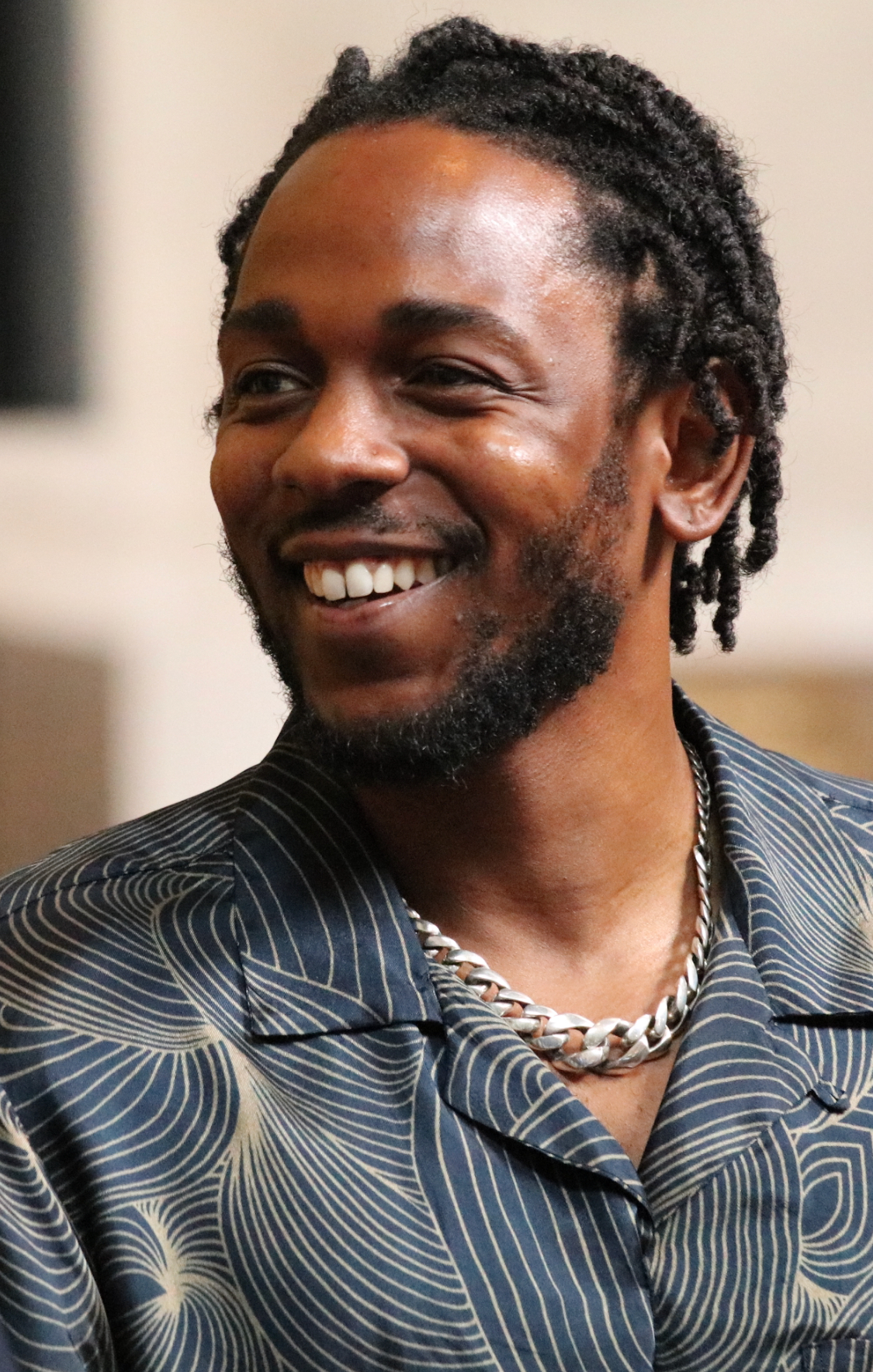
American rapper Kendrick Lamar has released socially conscious hip-hop songs

Conscious hip-hop (also known as socially conscious hip-hop or conscious rap) is a subgenre of hip hop that challenges the dominant cultural, social, political, sociopolitical, philosophical, and economic consensus, and/or comments on or focuses on social issues and conflicts. Conscious hip hop is not necessarily overtly political, but the terms "conscious hip hop" and "political hip hop" are frequently used interchangeably, and conscious hip hop may often be implicitly political. Conscious hip hop began to gain traction in the 1980s, along with hip hop in general. The term "nation-conscious rap" has been used to more specifically describe conscious hip hop music with certain strong political messages and themes, especially Black empowerment themes. Some themes of conscious hip hop include social conscience, religion, culture, the economy, depictions of the struggles of ordinary people, and aversion to or commentary on crime and violence, as well as potentially Afrocentricity. Conscious hip hop often seeks to raise awareness of social issues, sometimes leaving the listeners to form their own opinions rather than advocating for certain ideas and demanding actions like political hip hop. Conscious hip hop artists often use their music to express their views on a wide range of topics, including politics, race, poverty, and the environment.

== History of political and conscious hip hop ==
=== Origins and early development ===
Before the emergence of political hip hop, the Black Power Movement and the emphasis on black pride arising in the mid-1960s inspired several commentaries incorporating Black Power ideological elements. Songs expressing the theme of black pride include James Brown's "Say it Loud (I'm Black and Proud)" (1969) and Billy Paul's "Am I Black Enough for You?" (1972). The proto-rap of Gil Scott-Heron is an early influence on political and conscious rap, however, most of his earlier socially conscious and political albums fall within the jazz, soul, and funk genres. Following Ronald Reagan’s election as President in 1980, conditions in inner-city African-American communities worsened, and hip hop political commentators began to increasingly address worsening social problems such as mass unemployment, police brutality, incarceration, inadequate public schools, political apathy, and oppression. One of the first socially conscious hip hop songs was "How We Gonna Make the Black Nation Rise?" by Brother D with Collective Effort. One of the most successful early hip hop conscious rap songs was Grandmaster Flash and the Furious Five's "The Message", an influential political and conscious hip hop track, decrying the poverty, violence, and dead-end lives of the urban poor of the time. The 1985 film Rappin' saw a more political dimension to hip hop, including some verses of Ice-T's rap Killers, his first political record. Furthermore, the complex socio-political issues before hip hop and during all of its stages severely influenced its birth and direction.

=== Gangsta rap ===
Early gangsta rap often showed significant overlap with political and conscious rap. Pioneers in the gangsta rap genre such as Ice-T, N.W.A, Ice Cube, and the Geto Boys blended the crime stories, violent imagery, and aggression associated with gangsta rap with socio-political commentary. Using the now standard gangsta rap motifs of crime and violence, they were able to comment on the state of society and expose issues found within poor communities and society as a whole. These early gangsta rap artists were influenced in part by the bleak and often "revolutionary" crime novels of Iceberg Slim as well as hip hop groups such as Public Enemy and Boogie Down Productions; groups that mixed aggressive, confrontational lyrics about urban life with social-political commentary and often radical political messages. The controversial debut album Straight Outta Compton by N.W.A, released in 1989, brought gangsta rap to the mainstream, but it also contained harsh social and political commentary, including the confrontational track "Fuck tha Police". Ice-T's work would sometimes focus on other topics: for example, he rapped about free speech on his third album and about drunk driving, domestic violence, and Nelson Mandela on his fourth album.

After his departure from the group N.W.A in 1989, Ice Cube embarked on a solo career and released socio-political and conscious rap with gangsta rap elements in his 1990 debut album AmeriKKKa's Most Wanted and the companion EP Kill at Will; the 1991 album Death Certificate; followed by the 1992 album The Predator. Furthermore, Ice Cube produced and appeared on the controversial and radical political rap/gangsta rap album Guerillas in tha Mist by Da Lench Mob in the wake of the 1992 Los Angeles Riots. Though Ice Cube would continue to sporadically insert political and social commentary into his music throughout his career, he once again focused on conscious and political rap with his 2006 album Laugh Now, Cry Later and 2008's Raw Footage, featuring the single "Gangsta Rap Made Me Do It", a song dealing with the perceived correlation between music and global issues (e.g. the Iraq War, school shootings, etc.).

=== Underground rap ===
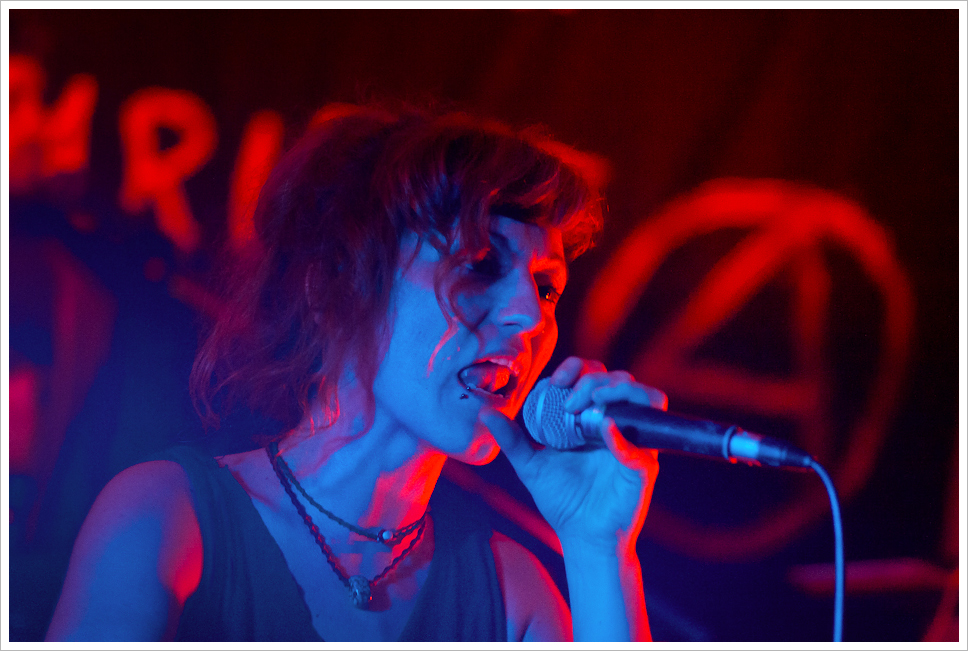
Greek anarchist rapper Miss Zebra performing political hip hop in Berlin

Underground rap, also known as underground hip hop, is a subgenre of hip hop known for its political and socially conscious lyrics. Unlike mainstream rap, which often focuses on themes such as money, power, and fame, underground rap addresses more serious and often controversial topics, such as racism, police brutality, and social inequality.

Underground rap artists are often critical of their government and its policies, and use their music to express their political views. Many underground rap songs are highly political, and the lyrics often reflect the artists' personal experiences and perspectives on social and political issues. For example, some songs may address specific incidents of police brutality, while others may discuss the effects of poverty and inequality on communities of color.

One of the main goals of underground rap is to challenge mainstream narratives and to provide an alternative voice to those who are often marginalized or ignored by mainstream media. In addition to addressing political and social issues, underground rap is known for its emphasis on artistic creativity and individuality. In contrast to mainstream rap, which often follows a formulaic approach, underground rap is more diverse and experimental in its sound and style. This allows underground rap artists to express themselves in unique and innovative ways and to create music that is truly original and authentic.

Underground rap is an important sub-genre of hip hop that provides a platform for artists to discuss important political and social issues while challenging mainstream narratives. By using their music to express their views and experiences, underground rap artists can raise awareness about important issues and inspire others to take action.

The artists who consistently produce conscious rap are largely considered underground. However, mainstream artists are increasingly including elements of conscious hip hop in their songs. There are hundreds of artists whose music could be described as "political" or who identify as political rappers: see the list of political hip hop artists page for a partial list.

== Hip hop in politics ==
Hip hop's impact on the political world is widespread. The response from mainstream politics has resulted in the spread of ideas, and opinions, and the formation of an informal dialogue surrounding largely controversial topics.

From the onset of hip hop in the 1980s throughout the 1990s, hip hop culture was either ignored or criticized by politicians. In the 1990s, the cultural idea that rap music was a symptom of the "destruction of American values" received bipartisan support. In 1992, Vice President Dan Quayle called on Interscope Records to withdraw 2Pacalypse Now because it was a "disgrace to American music". The catalyst for Quayle's outrage was an incident when a Texas youth shot a state trooper and referenced the album as his motivation. In 2Pacalypse Now, rapper Tupac Shakur raised issues of institutional racism, teen pregnancy, and police brutality. In the song "Trapped", he tells a fictional story of how a police officer slams him on the ground without cause, but before he gets arrested the police officer is shot. His lyrics read "how can I feel guilty after all the things they did to me?"

Throughout the 2000s, hip hop music has become a larger part of mainstream culture and is seen as more acceptable in the political sphere. In 2015, The Washington Post wrote "The politician's guide to how to be down with hip hop" which draws reference to the use of hip hop culture in politics. Criticism of hip hop that was considered moral and patriotic one generation ago, can make a politician seem "out of touch", especially with younger voters. Politician Mike Huckabee was viewed as being "out of touch" when he referred to Beyoncé as "mental poison" in his book: God, Guns, Grits, and Gravy. In 2008, during Barack Obama's Democratic primary campaign against then-rival Hillary Clinton, he referenced Jay-Z by doing his Dirt off Your Shoulder motion in a rally and the audience erupted with support. The embrace of hip hop has occurred across party lines. Republican Senator Marco Rubio is a vocal fan of Tupac and gangsta rap. Rubio said "In some ways rappers are like reporters... You had gang wars, racial tension, and they were reporting on that." 45th President of the United States Donald Trump leveraged hip hop to his advantage during his 2016 election campaign. He occasionally quoted that rapper Mac Miller wrote a song called "Donald Trump", and that it has over 100,000,000 views.

In the 2018 midterm elections, lawyer and former rapper Antonio Delgado was elected to New York's 19th congressional district.

== Ideology and views of political rappers ==
=== United States ===
As hip hop is a music genre originally created and dominated by African-Americans, political rappers often reference and discuss Black liberation and the Black power movement. Numerous hip hop songs express anti-racist views, such as the popular The Black Eyed Peas song "Where Is the Love?"; however, artists advocating for more radical Black liberation have remained controversial. Artists such as Public Enemy, Tupac Shakur, Ice Cube, Game, and Kendrick Lamar have advocated Black liberation in their lyrics and poetry. In Tupac Shakur's poem, "How Can We Be Free", Shakur discusses the sacrifices of Black political prisoners and the rejection of patriotic symbols. Artists in the 2010s, such as Killer Mike and Kendrick Lamar, have released songs criticizing the war on drugs and the prison industrial complex from an anti-racist perspective. Hip hop music continues to draw the attention and support of the struggles of minority groups in a modern method of communication that attracts a young demographic of activists. Kendrick Lamar and many other rappers have been credited with creating discussions regarding "Blackness" through their music.

Particularly with the advent of gangsta rap, many hip hop artists come from underclass backgrounds. Artists such as Tupac Shakur, Ice Cube, and Killer Mike have made references to class oppression. Tupac Shakur incorporates themes of revolutionary nationalism in his lyrics. In "Words of Wisdom" from the album 2Pacalypse Now, Shakur's lyrics underscore the refusal to accept economic inequality and inadequate employment opportunities.

Rappers often reference their religious views. Killer Mike, however, has been heavily critical of organized religion in many of his more political songs. Chicago-raised rapper Kanye West's The Life of Pablo album is another that offers an outlet for religious expression and self-assessment. In January 2019, West began hosting "Sunday Service" events where fans and invited guests can come to listen to choir renditions of his music, gospel songs, and pray.

==== Conspiracy theories ====
Conspiracy theories have been referenced in hip hop lyrics for some time. Elements of the Five-Percenter philosophy, which include a number of conspiracy theories, have significantly influenced hip hop culture. Rapper B.o.B is a member of the Flat Earth Society.

=== Worldwide ===
On a global scale, hip hop's public reputation and exhibition is varied. For instance, Canada's most prominent political hip hop act is The Dope Poet Society, who are known for anti-racist and anti-war activism, as well as denouncing both liberal and conservative politicians. Their politics could be described as third-worldism, or black internationalism. For example, in "Bombay to Zimbabwe," lead rapper Professor D states "from Bombay to Zimbabwe I study sharply: Bob Marley, Marcus Garvey, Mahatma Gandhi, Black Panther Party." Possibly on purpose, these influences seem ideologically contradictory in some ways (e.g. for instance, Marley's subtle socialism vs. Garvey's anti-communism, and non-violence vs. violence) but taken together they represent different approaches to the shared goal of linking anti-racist and anti-colonial struggles in the Americas and the rest of the world. Professor D and The Dope Poet Society also seem to represent this ideology on their album by featuring American political rappers like dead prez and others with rappers from around the world including Nigeria and Colombia. Other examples of hip hop around the world offer opposite perspectives. For example, Lowkey and Iron Sheik have expressed anti-Zionist views in their music, whereas Golan, Pope Troy and Subliminal have expressed pro-Zionist views, with Pope Troy combining Donald Trump's American conservative ideologues with pro-Israeli ideals acting as a political lobbyist for the different representation of groups.

== Political hip hop scenes outside the United States ==
=== Spanish- and Portuguese-speaking political hip hop scene ===
Political rappers of Hispanic, Brazilian or Portuguese descent include Calle 13, Racionais MC's, Olmeca, Tohil, Immortal Technique, Rebel Diaz, Manny Phesto, MRK, Portavoz, Facção Central, Psycho Realm, Ana Tijoux, Bocafloja, Zack de la Rocha, Pablo Hasél (Spain), Los Chikos del Maiz (from Valencia, Spain), and Canserbero.

=== UK political hip hop scene ===
Within the United Kingdom hip hop and Grime music scene, political, conscious rap is common, with artists including Lowkey, who focus on the Israel-Palestine conflict and other issues regarding the Middle East, Logic, Akala, I & Ideal, Mic Righteous, Klashnekoff, Mic Reckless, Riz MC and English Frank.

Before the snap election on June 8, 2017, Leader of the Opposition Jeremy Corbyn met with JME while campaigning for the Labour Party to encourage young people to register to vote. During the interview, JME explained that many young voters don't feel as though politicians have their best interests at heart. He said they often feel that voting makes no difference anyway. He went on to tell Corbyn that he is the first party leader he feels he can trust, because he is "so genuine it feels like I’m about to meet my mum’s friend".

=== Australian hip hop scene ===
Indigenous rappers Briggs and his collaboration with Trials for A.B. Original is one of the most prominent political hip hop artists in Australia. Artists Urthboy, Jimblah, The Herd, Horrorshow, and L-FRESH the Lion are all part of the Elefant Traks record label, and often have politically motivated songs. Their main focuses are racism and xenophobia but The Herd also focuses on issues of climate, gender inequality and war. Quro's 2007 EP Goodnight Mr. Howard contains overtly political critique of the Howard government and its policies. Some artists have expressed views on domestic violence through their lyrics. One example is the all-female indigenous hip hop group, Oetha, in their 2019 song Disturbing the Peace.

=== Norwegian rappers ===
Music created by Norwegian rappers often become part public discourse, making them part of the political process. This includes songs, lyrics and performances within the hip hop genre. Hip Hop music can be seen as an integral part of the democratic public sphere processes.

=== Iranian political hip hop ===
Due to the long history of human rights violations in Iran, many Iranian rappers address contemporary social and political issues through their music. Some well-known examples of Iranian political hip hop artists include Hichkas, Fadaei, Shapur, Quf, Yas, and Toomaj Salehi. Since it is illegal to criticize the government and social issues in Iran, most of the Iranian rappers live abroad.

Rapper Toomaj Salehi, who lives in Iran, was arrested during the Mahsa Amini protests on October 30, 2022, for his social awareness activities on his social media and releasing two protest songs "Battleground" and "Omen" during the protests. On November 27, 2022, Iranian media revealed that Salehi was charged with "corruption on Earth", an offense which could carry the death penalty. Salehi became one of the well-known faces of the revolutionary movement "Woman, Life, Freedom", denouncing the repression by the Iranian government. He has since been reportedly in solitary confinement and under torture.

=== Russian hip hop scene ===
Rap in the Russian Federation and other Russophone countries is becoming increasingly politicized. Many hip hop songs criticize the quality of life under Vladimir Putin and his regime.

== See also ==
- List of political hip-hop artists
- Protest music
- Jihadism and hip-hop
- Hip-hop feminism
- Hip-hop and social injustice
- Stop Murder Music

== Bibliography ==
- Bogdanov, Vladimir; Woodstra, Chris; Erlewine, Stephen Thomas; Bush, John (2003). The Definitive Guide to Rap & Hip-Hop. Backbeat Books, ISBN 0-87930-759-5.
- Mohamed Nasir, Kamaludeen (2020). Representing Islam: Hip-Hop of the September 11 Generation. Bloomington: Indiana University Press, ISBN 9780253053046.
