= Hip-hop and social injustice =

Hip-hop music, developed in the South Bronx in the early 1970s, has long been tied to social injustice in the United States, particularly that of the African American experience. Hip-hop artists have spoken out in their lyrics against perceived social injustices such as police brutality, poverty, mass incarceration, and the war on drugs. The relationship between hip-hop and social injustice can be seen most clearly in two subgenres of hip-hop, gangsta rap and conscious rap.

Political hip-hop has been criticized by conservative politicians such as Mississippi State Senator Chris McDaniel as divisive and promoting separatism due to some hip-hop artists' pro-black and anti-establishment lyrical content. Musicologist Robert Walser disputes this, arguing that many white youth who are exposed to hip-hop as children are more likely to have positive relationships with African Americans and resist racism from their parents or other sources out of respect for black artists they admire.

== History and background ==
=== Social injustice in American history ===
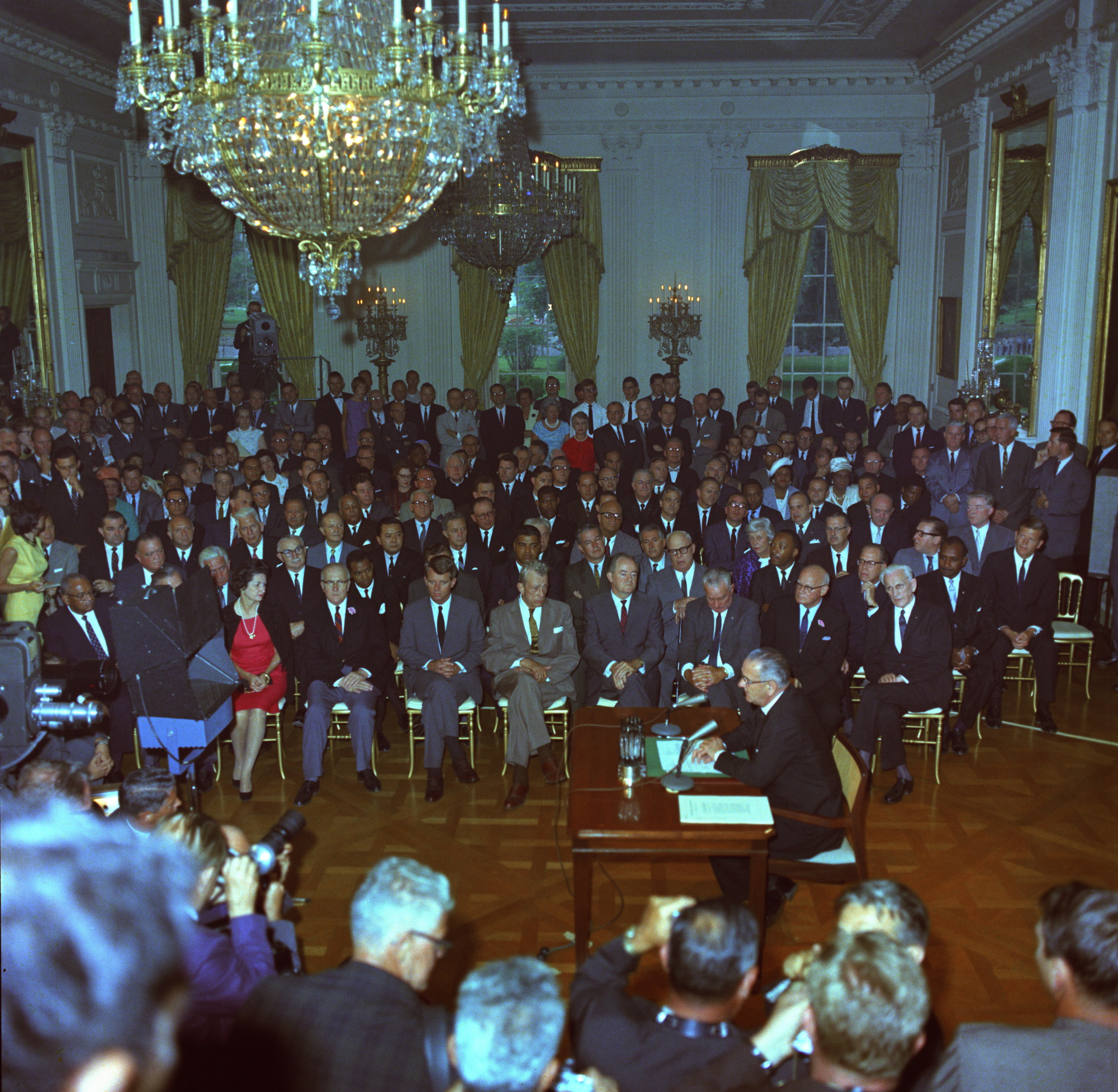
President Lyndon B. Johnson signing the Civil Rights Act of 1964

Social Injustice in American History starts from the very beginning from when America was first discovered in 1492 the year Columbus set sail. Once they discovered America they discovered something else, a new idea called "race". Colonialism was the first social injustice to happen in American History. Colonialism was a geographical project that consisted of conquering other people, settling in foreign lands and extracting natural resources. Later in American History beginning in the 17th century African men, women and children were kidnapped and were brought to the Americas under horrible conditions where it is believed that more than 2 million Africans died on the voyage to America. Slavery mainly consisted of labor in the fields while a select few did domestic work around the owners home. It wasn't until 1863 that Abraham Lincoln signed the Emancipation Proclamation that would put an end to slavery. These men, women and children were discriminated against and treated very poorly. Discrimination is defined as "treatment on the basis of inadequately justified factors other than race that disadvantages a racial group". After Slavery though things didn't get much better for Black people. Almost immediately they were segregated from the whites while not having a lot of say in the government because of literacy tests and taxes and the grandfather clause which stated that if your grandfather could vote than you don't have to take the literacy tests or pay the tax. After many years of hard fought political battles for black people in 1964 the civil rights act of 1964 was passed which made it illegal to discriminate against a person because of their color and it also ended segregation. Now modern era social injustices include employment discrimination amongst women, police brutality amongst minorities and educational inequality with poor areas of the United States.

=== History of hip-hop ===
Hip-hop is a cultural movement that became extremely popular in the 1980s and ’90s. It has also lead to the backing music for the rap genre. The musical style incorporates rhythmic and rhyming speech that became the genres longest lasting and most influential art form.

=== Social injustice in music ===
Music has long had a close relationship with politics and social injustice. Before the advent of recording technology and popular music, classical composers during the French Revolution composed music to support the democratic ideals of the revolution. An example of this is Ludwig van Beethoven's Symphony No. 3, originally entitled Bonaparte and dedicated to the French emperor Napoleon I, which was renamed Eroica after Beethoven felt Napoleon had forsaken the ideals of the Revolution. Similarly, Italian opera composer Giuseppe Verdi's third opera Nabucco, which is based on the Biblical books of Jeremiah and Daniel, served as a rallying cry and anthem of sorts to the Risorgimento movement of Italian unification against the occupying Austrian empire.

==== Social injustice in popular music ====
American folk music has a long tradition of music dealing with social injustice, a tradition which only became more popular and widespread with the advent of recording technology and the development of popular music. Some early music of this kind includes "Strange Fruit" by Billie Holiday and "The Bourgeois Blues" by Lead Belly, which decried injustices against the African American community.

Protest music took on a new form in the 1960s and 70s with the advent of psychedelia and punk rock. Notable artists in this genre such as the Beatles, Bob Dylan, Jimi Hendrix, and Sam Cooke composed and released music that opposed the Vietnam War, supported the civil rights movement, and advocated for world peace. Many of these artists were involved in or influential towards the "hippie" movement of these decades. Since the 1980s and the rise in popularity of hip-hop, much of American hip-hop has come from this genre.

== Gangsta rap ==
Gangsta rap, pioneered in the mid 1980s in Los Angeles, is characterized by explicit, often violent lyrics in opposition to police brutality, mass incarceration, and systemic racism. Despite its socially conscious elements, exemplified by songs like Ice-T's "6 in the Mornin'" and N.W.A's "Fuck tha Police", the genre often tended to utilize extensive profanity and misogynistic lyrics, negatively affecting the public perception of the genre. As the genre developed, more Southern California artists such as 2Pac and Snoop Dogg emerged and brought the genre to mainstream success with hits like "Gin and Juice" and "California Love". The gangsta rap phenomenon spread across the United States, with similar styles of music emerging in New York City by artists like Mobb Deep, Nas, and the Wu-Tang Clan. The politically outspoken element of gangsta rap exists to this day. A particularly potent example of this is YG's 2017 album Still Brazy, which features tracks like "FDT", "Police Get Away Wit Murder", and "Blacks & Browns" which denounce systemic racism and police brutality and advocate for unity between minority groups.

While in the media the genre was referred to as gangsta rap, some artists within the sub-genre referred to it as "reality rap", feeling that the explicit and violent nature was a reflection of the reality that they lived in or had grown up in.

== Conscious rap ==
Conscious rap, also known as backpack rap or alternative hip-hop, is a subgenre of hip-hop which primarily features lyrical themes that highlight social injustice facing underprivileged communities in a more nuanced and subtle fashion than gangsta rap. Conscious rap has its roots in the Black Arts Movement of the 1960s and 1970s, with both poets and musicians such as The Last Poets and Watts Prophets kickstarting the movement of both artistic and political lyrics. Throughout the 1980s and 1990s many record labels were hesitant to sign conscious or political rappers due to their fears that it was a sub-genre without a large audience and that the strong progressive opinions voiced in the lyrics could have negative repercussions for the label from conservative politicians and commentators who disagreed with the stances expressed in the music. The first artists to gain popularity included Nas, A Tribe Called Quest, and Public Enemy, although the latter is often classified under Gangsta rap rather than conscious rap. Many of the most prominent figures in conscious hip-hop emerged in the early 2000s in Chicago and New York, with artists like Mos Def, Lupe Fiasco, Talib Kweli, and Common bringing the genre to a wider audience. Conscious hip-hop has continued to find success in the mainstream in recent years, as artists like Kendrick Lamar, J. Cole, Logic, and Joey Bada$$ have achieved mainstream success while promoting socially conscious messages.

== Notable artists ==
=== Public Enemy ===
New York City based rap crew Public Enemy was one of the first hip-hop artists to be both popular in the hip-hop community and outspoken about political and racial issues. Their lyrics contain criticism of law enforcement ("Fight the Power", "911 is a Joke") and white Americans and modern racism ("Fear of a Black Planet", etc.), and promote social change with regard to the treatment of African Americans by the white community ("Revolutionary Generation").

Public Enemy's lyrics were meant to be shocking and hostile, as they went against the norm for American culture at the time and cultivated an image in the media as a "gangsta group". Chuck D has also been outspoken about his views on capitalism and its link with racism, economic exploitation, oppression of minorities in the United States, and has called for unification within the black community. "They'll tell you capitalism sees no color, but at the same time the ones that all feel they have something in common with each other become the most powerful block right there, and it stomps upon those that don't fit that mold. And the only way that you can exist within that mold is that you have to put together a 'posse,' or a team to be able to penetrate that structure. [...] we [black Americans] as a constituency have to stick together and realize that we all have something in common with each other."

=== N.W.A ===
N.W.A was a Los Angeles rap group made up of future hip-hop legends such as Dr. Dre, Ice Cube, Eazy-E, and MC Ren. As pioneers of the gangsta rap subgenre along with Ice T, N.W.A. is best known for its politically charged, profanity filled singles "Fuck tha Police" and "Straight Outta Compton" which painted stark portraits of violence in the poverty-stricken ghettos of Compton, California and the prevalence of police brutality. However, the misogyny and profanity in the group’s lyrics as well as their image as violent and dangerous negatively affected the public perception of N.W.A., gangsta rap, and all hip-hop in general. Their debut studio album, Straight Outta Compton, was banned from radio stations and received virtually no promotion from any major media source, yet has gone on to receive triple-platinum certification from the RIAA and is widely considered one of the most influential albums of all time. A 2015 biopic film, also entitled Straight Outta Compton, helped solidify N.W.A.'s cultural legacy that culminated with an induction into the Rock and Roll Hall of Fame in 2016.

=== 2Pac ===
Tupac Shakur, more commonly known by his stage name 2Pac, is one of the best-selling artists of all time and has influenced countless hip-hop artists, making his social commentary in his lyrics all the more visible. Shakur's parents were both members of the Black Panther Party, and Tupac's lyrical content had a relatively wide range which included violent and aggressive gangsta rap ("Hit 'Em Up", "Me and My Girlfriend", "Ambitionz Az a Ridah") to emotionally-charged conscious rap ("Changes", "Trapped", "Keep Ya Head Up", "Brenda's Got a Baby"). A few of these songs in particular serve as strong denunciations of social injustice.

Tupac has been an influence to hip-hop artists since his death as both a musical artist and as an icon of social justice. Artists such as Kendrick Lamar, Tory Lanez, J. Cole, and Eminem have all cited Shakur as an influence on their music and their message.

=== Kanye West ===
Chicago based rapper, singer, producer, and fashion designer Kanye West, who rose to prominence in the early 2000s and has since amassed tremendous critical acclaim and commercial success, has been known for his outspoken opinions and lyrics on racial and social issues since his debut album The College Dropout (2004). The album featured lyrical topics such as the dangers of consumerism, poverty, racism, mass incarceration, and the downsides of higher education. On a single from The College Dropout, "All Falls Down", West criticized the police and the lack of social mobility in the U.S.

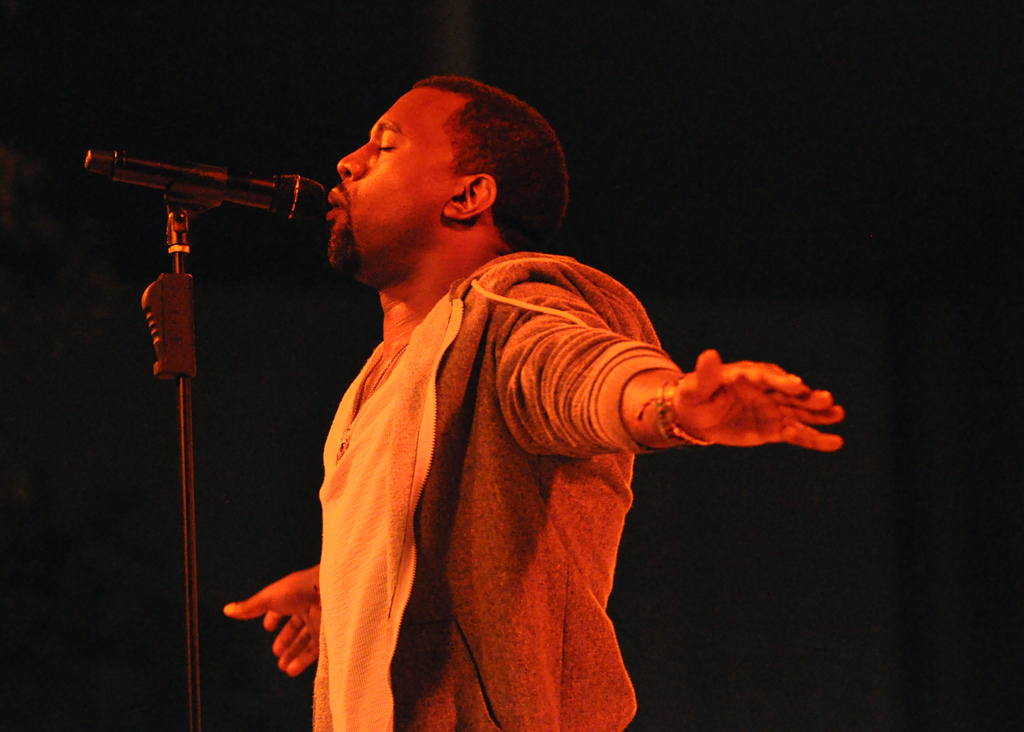
Multi-platinum Grammy winning rapper Kanye West has repeatedly spoken out against social injustice in his lyrics and in various public statements.

Since the mid-2000s, West has continued to comment on social injustice in his music. Notable examples include 2013's "New Slaves", which comments on the racism West has encountered as an African American in the European-dominated field of high fashion and 2005's "Crack Music" which comments on the war on drugs, the American crack epidemic, and references the Black Panthers.

West has been spoken out against social injustice outside of music as well. He infamously made headlines in 2005 for his remark "George Bush doesn't care about black people" during a live broadcast relief concert for the victims of Hurricane Katrina. West's comment is usually attributed to his frustration with George W. Bush and FEMA's perceived slow response to the disaster while the majority-black residents of urban New Orleans suffered. That same year, West spoke out against homophobia in hip-hop culture during an MTV interview.

=== Lupe Fiasco ===
Chicago artist Lupe Fiasco has long been one of the most outspoken conscious rappers since his debut album Lupe Fiasco's Food & Liquor in 2006. Fiasco's lyrics include topics such as mass incarceration ("Prisoner 1 & 2"), poverty in African American ghettos ("Hurt Me Soul", "Deliver"), child soldiers in Africa ("Little Weapon"), the Syrian Refugee crisis ("Alan Forever"), misogyny ("Bitch Bad"), and systemic racism throughout American history ("Around My Way (Freedom Ain't Free)").

In an interview with Bill O'Reilly in 2011, Fiasco talked about the nature of his music and its political influence, saying, "My fight against terrorism, to me, the biggest terrorist is Obama and the United States of America. I'm trying to fight the terrorism that's actually causing the other forms of terrorism. You know, the root cause of terrorism is the stuff the U.S. government allows to happen. The foreign policies that we have in place in different countries that inspire people to become terrorists." In January 2013, Fiasco was removed from the stage of a pre-inauguration concert in Washington, D.C., after performing the politically charged song "Words I Never Said" for 30 minutes. The song includes lyrics that are critical of Obama such as "Gaza Strip was getting bombed, Obama didn't say shit / That's why I ain't vote for him, next one either."

=== J. Cole ===
North Carolina native J. Cole's 2011 debut album Cole World: The Sideline Story features socially conscious lyrics on tracks such as "Lights Please" and "Lost Ones". Cole, along with Kendrick Lamar and Kanye West have played the biggest role in bringing conscious hip-hop to a global audience in recent years. Cole's third album 2014 Forest Hills Drive was the first conscious hip-hop album (and one of the first hip-hop albums) to go double platinum without any features from other artists. Throughout his career, J. Cole's music has taken a more conscious tone, most notably on his 2017 album KOD, which features anti-drug themes, "Once an Addict (Interlude)", and commentary on the American tax system, "Brackets".

=== Meek Mill ===
Philadelphia rapper Meek Mill has become a symbol for prison reform in recent years. While most of his music prior to 2018 is not categorized as conscious, political, or gangsta rap, the tone of his music changed after serving six months of a two to four-year sentence for violating parole. Since being released, his music has taken a political turn, with songs like "What's Free", "Oodles O' Noodles Babies", and "Stay Woke" calling out the criminal justice system for systemic racism and discussing the effect of poverty on black youths across America. Meek Mill's case was allegedly mishandled on multiple occasions, with Judge Genece Brinkley under investigation by the FBI for partial treatment of Mill's case and one of the officers involved in the 2007 arrest under investigation for corruption as well. Meek's activism is not limited to lyrics; he has publicly advocated for prison reform on platforms such as CNN.

=== Kendrick Lamar ===
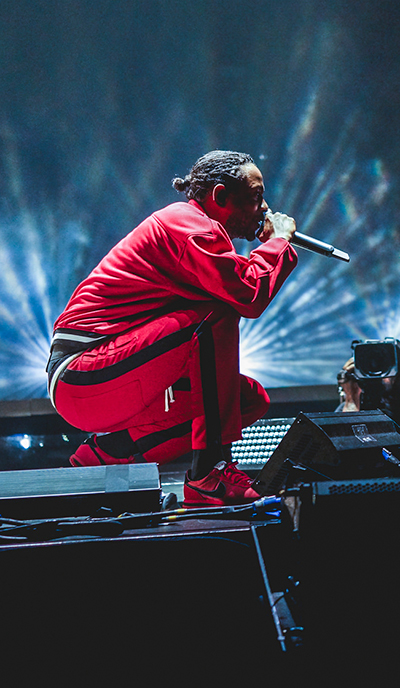
Conscious rapper Kendrick Lamar has seen tremendous success in the mainstream in recent years.

Kendrick Lamar has been one of the 2010s' most famous conscious rappers, discussing a wide range of topics in his lyrics such as domestic violence ("No Makeup [Her Vice]"), the American crack epidemic ("A.D.H.D"), gang violence ("M.A.A.D City"), African American identity ("The Blacker the Berry"), racism ("Complexion"), and gun violence ("XXX"). Lamar's 2015 hit "Alright" became a rallying cry for the Black Lives Matter movement, symbolizing hope and optimism in the face of discrimination and persecution.

Lamar was at the center of a recent controversy regarding a set of lyrics from his 2015 song "Alright" in which he states: "And we hate po po, wanna kill us dead in the streets for sure." This line was read in a Fox News segment featuring Geraldo Rivera, Dana Perino, Eric Bolling, and Kimberly Guilfoyle, during which Rivera responded, "[...]this is why I say that hip hop has done more damage to young African Americans than racism in recent years". Lamar then responded to this comment in his 2017 songs "DNA." and "YAH.", denouncing the perceived ignorance in his statement.

=== Joey Badass ===
Brooklyn rapper Joey Badass's 2017 sophomore album, All-Amerikkkan Badass, is largely political, criticizing Donald Trump ("Rockabye Baby"), police brutality ("Land of the Free"), and systemic racism ("Y U Don't Love Me? (Miss Amerikkka")"). The Brooklyn native has achieved critical acclaim as well commercial success following a more traditional "boom bap" musical style and lyrics involving social injustice.

== Hip-hop and LGBTQ+ issues ==
Hip-hop music has had a controversial relationship with the LGBTQ+ community. Homophobia in the form of slurs and violent lyrics towards LGBTQ+ individuals has existed in hip-hop for decades. Most infamously, Eminem, the best-selling hip-hop artist of all time, has been accused of homophobia numerous times due to his use of homophobic slurs in his lyrics such as these from his 2001 song "Criminal" from The Marshall Mathers LP.

Eminem has addressed his use of the homophobic slurs "fag" and "faggot" in his lyrics, claiming that he does not use it to specifically demean homosexuals but instead to insult one's manhood. He also famously performed his hit song "Stan" with openly gay singer Elton John at the 2001 Grammy Awards in an attempt to publicly reconcile with the LGBT community.

However, in more recent years, hip-hop has developed a more inclusive attitude towards the LGBTQ+ community. Several hip-hop artists have spoken out against homophobia and in support of LGBTQ+ rights, with the most popular instance of this being Seattle-based hip-hop duo Macklemore & Ryan Lewis's Grammy-nominated single "Same Love" from 2012. The single has gone triple platinum in the U.S. and 9× Platinum in other English-speaking countries, and focuses on common misconceptions about homosexuality. Macklemore specifically focuses on the effect of social media and the internet on homophobia and LGBTQ+ intolerance, as well as the hip-hop community's historical intolerance of the LGBTQ+ community.

In recent years, more hip-hop artists have come out as gay, lesbian, or bisexual. Artists such as Frank Ocean, Tyler the Creator, Kevin Abstract, Young M.A., ILoveMakonnen, Taylor Bennett, Lil Peep and Lil Nas X have been open about their LGBTQ identities and made efforts for the genre to become more inclusive and accepting.

L.A.-based hip-hop group Brockhampton rose to prominence in hip-hop in 2017. The group's frontman, Kevin Abstract, is openly gay and has talked in interviews about his desire to make a change in the perception of homosexuality in the hip-hop community through normalizing it. "I don't want to be a queer icon," Abstract told NME in an interview in 2018. "I want to be an icon. [...] In order to make a change, I have to exist in a traditionally homophobic space such as hip-hop. If I were to just be this queer rapper, who only spoke to queer kids, I don't think I could as effectively make a change for another young, black queer kid growing up in Texas."

== Donald Trump and hip-hop ==
Donald Trump, 45th president of the United States, has had a long and complicated relationship with hip-hop. Prior to 2015, many references to Donald Trump were made in hip-hop music, mostly celebrating his status as a symbol of wealth, power, and machismo. However, since his incendiary 2016 presidential campaign, references to the president in hip-hop have been overwhelmingly negative, criticizing Trump's perceived racist views. References in YG's "FDT", Joey Bada$$'s "Rockabye Baby" and "Land of the Free", Eminem's "Campaign Speech" and 2017 BET cypher, Denzel Curry's "Sirens", Joyner Lucas' "I'm Not Racist" and many more all criticize or even threaten Trump for his divisive rhetoric and alleged racist views and policies.

However, a prominent example of support for Donald Trump within the hip-hop community has come from rapper and producer Kanye West, who has voiced his support for Trump during rants within his concerts, multiple tweets including pictures wearing Trump's signature MAGA hat, and even lyrics on his song "Ye Vs. The People." West has since distanced himself from politics and implied withdrawing support for Trump. Similar rappers like Bryson Gray, Forgiatto Blow, and Tom McDonald mention Trump in their music in a positive way, this genre is dubbed "MAGA rap".

== See also ==
- African-American leftism
- Social justice
- List of political hip-hop artists
- Jihadism and hip-hop
- Hip-hop feminism
- Homophobia in hip-hop culture
- List of murdered hip-hop musicians
