= Mr. Jeff =

American children's musician

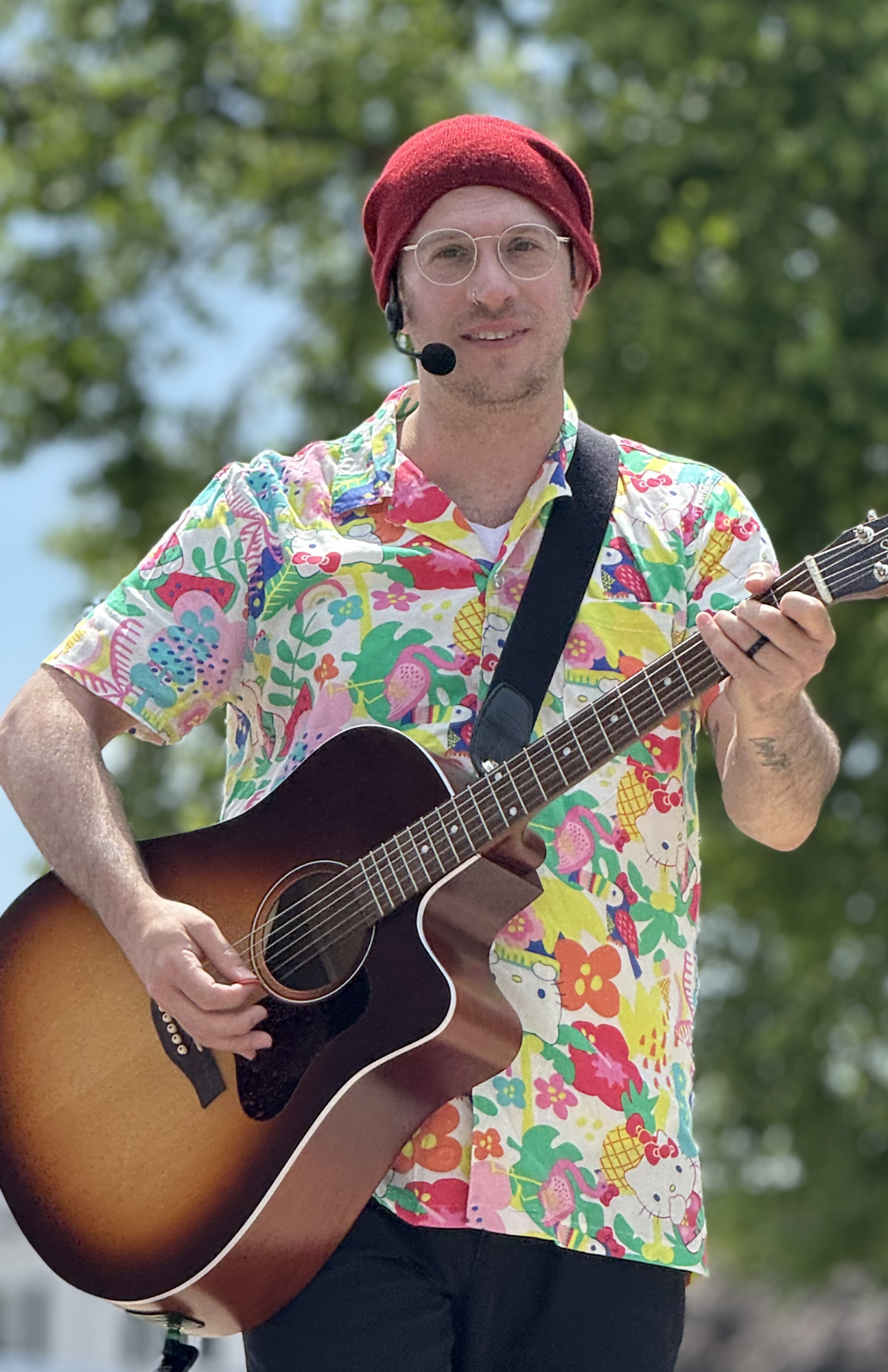
- Klemm in 2024
- Born: Jeffrey Christopher Klemm; May 23, 1987 (age 39)
- Occupations: Singer; songwriter; record producer; entertainer; content creator
- Years active: 2007–present
- Spouse: Jillian Klemm (m. 2020)
- Children: 3
- Relatives: Drew Louis (brother)
- Musical career
- Genres: Rock; pop; children's music
- Website: mrjeffisfun.com

Jeffery Christopher Klemm (born May 23, 1987), known professionally as Mr. Jeff and Jeff Klemm, is an American singer, songwriter, record producer, and content creator. He makes children's music, and is a member of The Recording Academy.

== Personal life ==
Klemm was born and raised in Northeast Ohio and now resides in Cuyahoga Falls. His brother is songwriter and record producer Drew Louis. He has three children. He married Jillian Klemm in 2020. Klemm told Ideastream that he decided to get sober after the birth of his first son in 2016.

== Career ==
Klemm got his start performing in bands around the Akron, Ohio, area. In February 2022, Klemm was on The News with Shepard Smith to speak on the third-party settlement organizations tax laws regarding services like Venmo and Zelle.

In 2024, Klemm debuted his first children's music as Mr. Jeff, with his debut album Wonderful Wonderful Wonderful. Later that year, he got an honorable mention for the single "Loud In the Library" for the International Songwriting Competition children's music award. In June 2024, he became a member of The Recording Academy.

In August 2025, he released his third studio album, Big Kid Stuff, featuring children's musicians Miss Jessica, Fyütch, Ronnie Boy Kids, Tara Trudel, and Mega Ran. In 2025, he joined the board of directors at the Children's Music Network. Klemm was named as a 2025–2026 Music Incubator Artist for Cleveland Rocks by the Cleveland Foundation. In May 2025, he worked on a track for Fyütch's album Harmony, which won the Grammy Award for Best Children's Music Album in January 2026.

In August 2026, Klemm released his fourth studio album, I've Got Heart, featuring Snooknuk, Flor Bromley, and Kymberly Stewart, and tracks produced and written with Drew Louis.

== Discography ==
All credits adapted from Apple Music and Spotify.

=== As Mr. Jeff ===
==== Singles ====
| Year | Title | Album | Writer(s) | Producer(s) |
|---|---|---|---|---|
| 2026 | “Patience” | I’ve Got Heart | Jeff Klemm | Jeff Klemm |
| 2026 | “Keep Swimming” (featuring Snooknuk) | I’ve Got Heart | Jeff Klemm, LaJuana Pigram Jacobs | Jeff Klemm, Drew Louis |
| 2025 | "Run Rudolph Run" | Non-album single | Johnny Marks, Marvin Brodie | Jeff Klemm |
| 2025 | "GirlDad" | Big Kid Stuff | Jeff Klemm | Jeff Klemm |
| 2025 | "Picasso" | Big Kid Stuff | Jeff Klemm | Jeff Klemm |
| 2025 | "Dancing Like An Animal" | Non-album singles | Jeff Klemm | Jeff Klemm |
| 2024 | "Wonderful Christmastime" | Non-album singles | Paul McCartney | Jeff Klemm |
| 2024 | "Sleepover" | Wonderful Wonderful Wonderful | Jeff Klemm | Jeff Klemm |
| 2024 | "Poppin' Bubbles" | Wonderful Wonderful Wonderful | Jeff Klemm | Jeff Klemm |
| 2024 | "Playin' On the Playground" | Wonderful Wonderful Wonderful | Jeff Klemm | Jeff Klemm |
| 2024 | "Wonderful Wonderful Wonderful!!!" | Wonderful Wonderful Wonderful | Jeff Klemm | Jeff Klemm |
| 2024 | "Loud In the Library" | Wonderful Wonderful Wonderful | Jeff Klemm | Jeff Klemm |

==== Studio albums ====
| Title | Details |
|---|---|
| I’ve Got Heart | Released: August 21, 2026; Label: Self-released; Format: Digital download, streaming; Track listing: 1. "I’ve Got Heart!"; 2. "Keep Swimming" (featuring Snooknuk); 3. "Compliment Sandwich" (featuring Flor Bromley); 4. "What Is Indigo?"; 5. "Patience"; 6. "Show Up, Work Hard"; 7. "Make The Best Choice"(featuring Kymberly Stewart); 8. "Daylight Saving"; 9. "You Can Do Anything!"; 10. "Threenager"; 11. "Welcome To The World"; 12. "I Will Take Good Care Of You" |
| Big Kid Stuff | Released: August 22, 2025; Label: Self-released; Format: Digital download, streaming; Track listing: 1. "Mr. Jeff Theme (Introduction)"; 2. "Picasso"; 3. "You Can Do Hard Things" (featuring Ronnie Boy Kids); 4. "We Hear You" (featuring Fyütch & Miss Jessica); 5. "Big Kid Stuff!"; 6. "GirlDad"; 7. "I'll Never Be Anyone But Me" (featuring Tara Trudel); 8. "Stressed Out"; 9. "Fly By Toilet"; 10. "Uh-Oh!"; 11. "Game Night With The Fam" (featuring Mega Ran); 12. "All Over The World" |
| Slumberful Slumberful Slumberful (Dreamy Piano Version) | Released: October 4, 2024; Label: Self-released; Format: Digital download, streaming; Track listing: 1. "Wonderful Wonderful Wonderful!!! - Dreamy Piano Version"; 2. "Playin' On the Playground - Dreamy Piano Version"; 3. "Poppin' Bubbles - Dreamy Piano Version"; 4. "Loud In the Library - Dreamy Piano Version"; 5. "Drivin' In My Racecar - Dreamy Piano Version"; 6. "Do What Big Kids Do - Dreamy Piano Version"; 7. "The Jellyfish Dances Like This! - Dreamy Piano Version"; 8. "It Is Your Birthday. - Dreamy Piano Version"; 9. "Yeah Yeah (We're So Bendy) - Dreamy Piano Version"; 10. "Mr. Jeff's Numbers Song - Dreamy Piano Version"; 11. "Lose the 'Tude - Dreamy Piano Version"; 12. "Relax... - Dreamy Piano Version"; 13. "Sleepover - Dreamy Piano Version" |
| Wonderful Wonderful Wonderful | Released: March 22, 2024; Label: Self-released; Format: Digital download, streaming; Track listing: 1. "Wonderful Wonderful Wonderful!!!"; 2. "Playin' On the Playground"; 3. "Poppin' Bubbles"; 4. "Loud In the Library"; 5. "Drivin' In My Racecar"; 6. "Do What Big Kids Do"; 7. "The Jellyfish Dances Like This!"; 8. "It Is Your Birthday."; 9. "Yeah Yeah (We're So Bendy)"; 10. "Mr. Jeff's Numbers Song"; 11. "Lose the 'Tude"; 12. "Relax..."; 13. "Sleepover" |

=== As Jeff Klemm ===
| Title | Details |
|---|---|
| A Fool's Delight (Deluxe Reissue) | Released: January 22, 2021; Label: Self-released; Format: Digital download, streaming; Track listing: 1. "A Morning Breath"; 2. "Open Up Your Doors"; 3. "Sit Tight, I'm Almost Happy"; 4. "Straight as an Arrow in Chesapeake Bay"; 5. "Nevermore"; 6. "A Boy and His Dream"; 7. "Glimpse of Bliss"; 8. "Oh Lovely"; 9. "Midsummer's Night (I'm in a Dream)"; 10. "Hour Dream" |
| Burying the Shadows | Released: December 11, 2015; Label: Self-released; Format: Digital download, streaming; Track listing: 1. "Ocean Meets the Sky"; 2. "13 Missed Calls"; 3. "Fix"; 4. "Barely Living"; 5. "Pale Blue Moon"; 6. "Burned"; 7. "Weight of the World"; 8. "Just Not Meant to Be"; 9. "Without You"; 10. "Burying the Shadows"; 11. "Error of My Ways"; 12. "You're Breaking My Heart (The Whiskey Song)" |

=== As featured artist ===
| Title | Year | Album |
|---|---|---|
| "Power of Love" (Patrick Adams & Mr. Jeff) | 2025 | Kindies Do the 80's, Vol. 5 |

== Awards & nominations ==
| Year | Award ceremony | Nominee(s)/work(s) | Category | Result | Ref. |
|---|---|---|---|---|---|
| 2025 | World Entertainment Award | Wonderful Wonderful Wonderful | Best Children's Album | Won | |
| 2024 | International Songwriting Competition | "Loud In the Library" | Children's Music | Honorable mention | |
