= Harmony (Fyütch and Aura V album) =

Studio album by Fyütch & Aura V
- Released: May 23, 2025
- Length: 37:59
- Label: Fyüsion
- Producer: Harold Michael Simmons II; Deanna Hawkins

Singles from Harmony
- 1. "I Am Love, I Am Light" Released: January 29, 2024; 2. "I Am Love, I Am Light (Jersey Club Remix)" Released: March 4, 2024; 3. "My Daddy (featuring VanVan)" Released: May 17, 2024; 4. "Count It Up (Money)" Released: September 27, 2024; 5. "Harmony (featuring Kymberly Stewart)" Released: October 10, 2024; 6. "The Greatest Song Ever (featuring Genevieve Goings)" Released: Feb 28, 2025; 7. "Aura V Anthem" Released: May 6, 2025

Harmony is a children’s music studio album by American musician Fyütch and his daughter Aura V, released on May 23, 2025. It won the Grammy Award for Best Children’s Music Album in February 2026.

== Background ==
Harmony was made by the father-daughter duo Fyütch and Aura V. It has thirteen tracks, featuring Mega Ran, Genevieve Goings, Divinity Roxx, Kimberly Stewart, Mr. Jeff, VanVan, and Kaitlin Becker. Aura’s grandfather played saxophone on the album as well. The album won the Grammy Award for Best Children's Music Album in February 2026, with Aura V taking the title of youngest Grammy Award recipient from Blue Ivy Carter.

== Accolades ==
Organization	Year	Category	Result	Ref.
Grammy Awards	2026	Best Children's Music Album	Won	

== Track listing ==
All tracks are written by Harold Michael Simmons II and Aura Valentina Simmons, with additional writers noted. All tracks produced by Simmons II, with additional producers noted. Track listing and credits adapted from Apple Music and Spotify.

Harmony – Standard edition
No.	Title	Writer(s)	Producer(s)	Length
1.	"Thankful (Intro)"			1:08
2.	"Thankful"	Kymberly Stewart		4:05
3.	"I Am Love, I Am Light"			3:01
4.	"My Daddy" (featuring VanVan)	Vannah McConneheaugh; Reggie McConneheaugh		2:42
5.	"Aura V Anthem"			1:06
6.	"Harmony" (featuring Kymberly Stewart)	Deanna Hawkins	Hawkins	3:28
7.	"The Greatest Song Ever" (featuring Genevieve Goings)	Hawkins; Goings	Hawkins	3:05
8.	"Count It Up (Money)"			3:02
9.	"Number 1 Fan" (featuring Mega Ran)	Raheem Jarbo		4:27
10.	"Weekend With My Bestie" (featuring Kaitlin Becker)	Becker		2:59
11.	"I Am Love, I Am Light" (Jersey Club Remix)	Angel Martinez		2:55
12.	"Harmony" (GoGo remix; featuring Divinity Roxx & Divi Roxx Kids)	Roxx	Hawkins	3:54
13.	"Goodbye Is Not The End"			2:00
Total length:				37:59

== Personnel ==
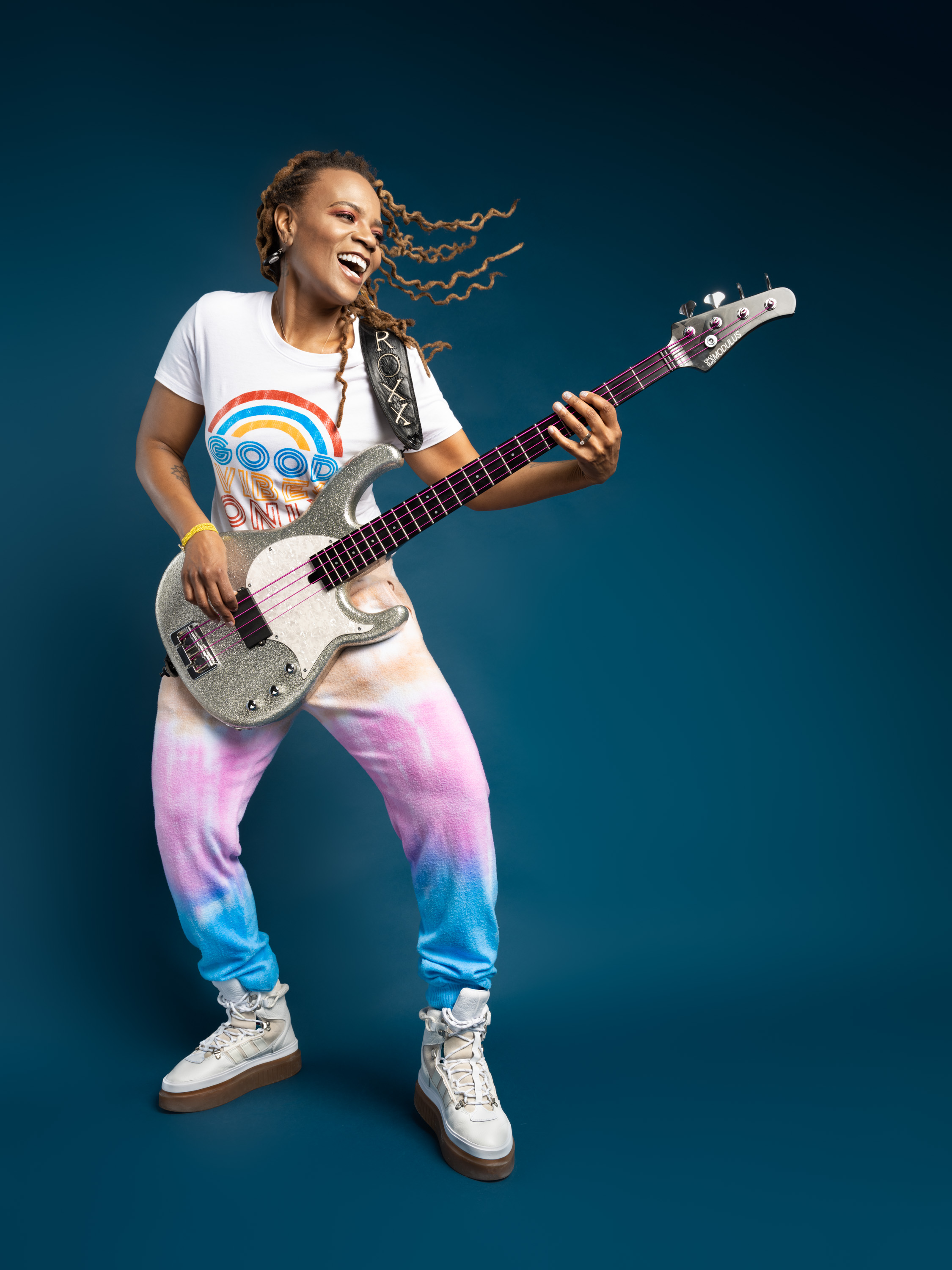
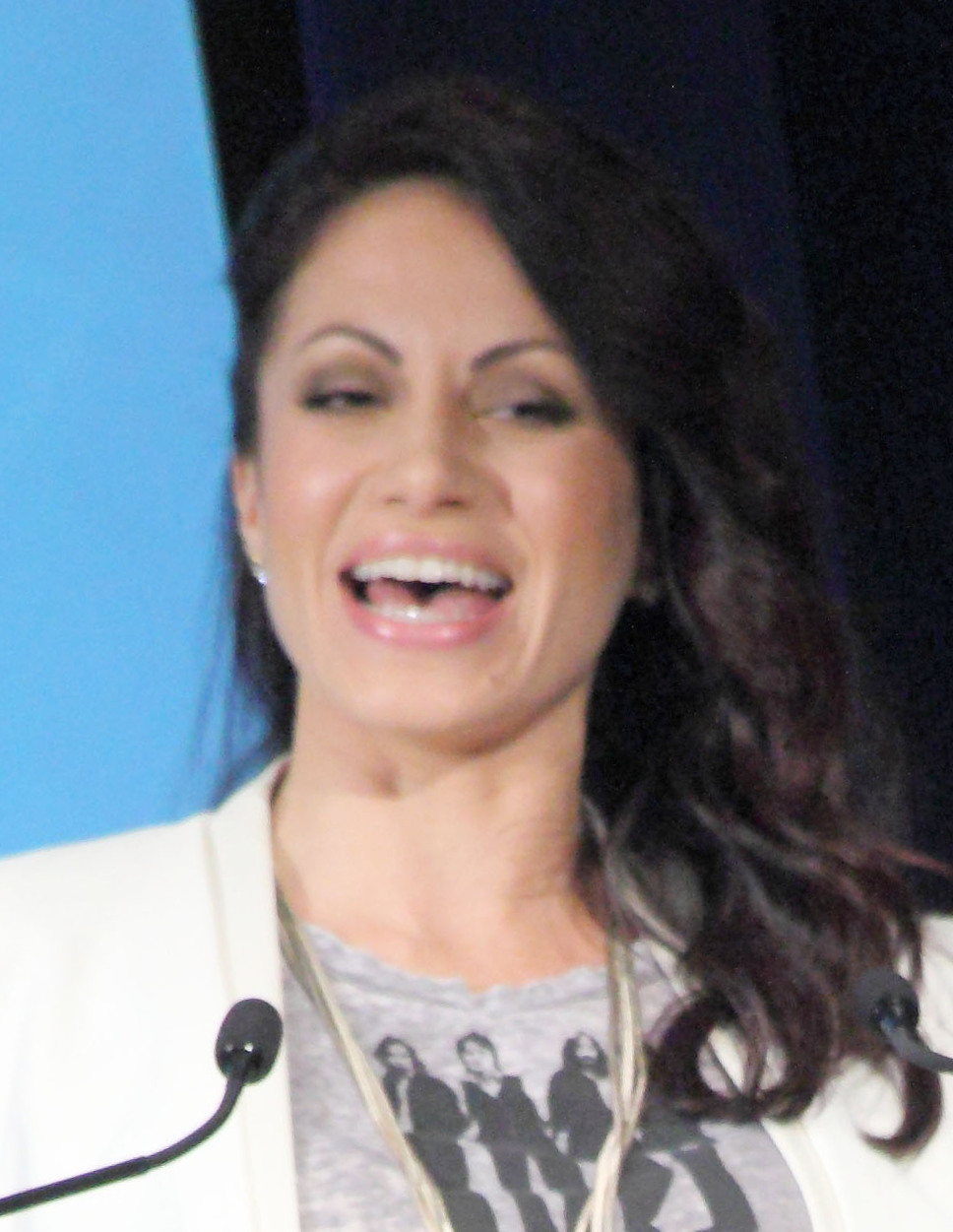
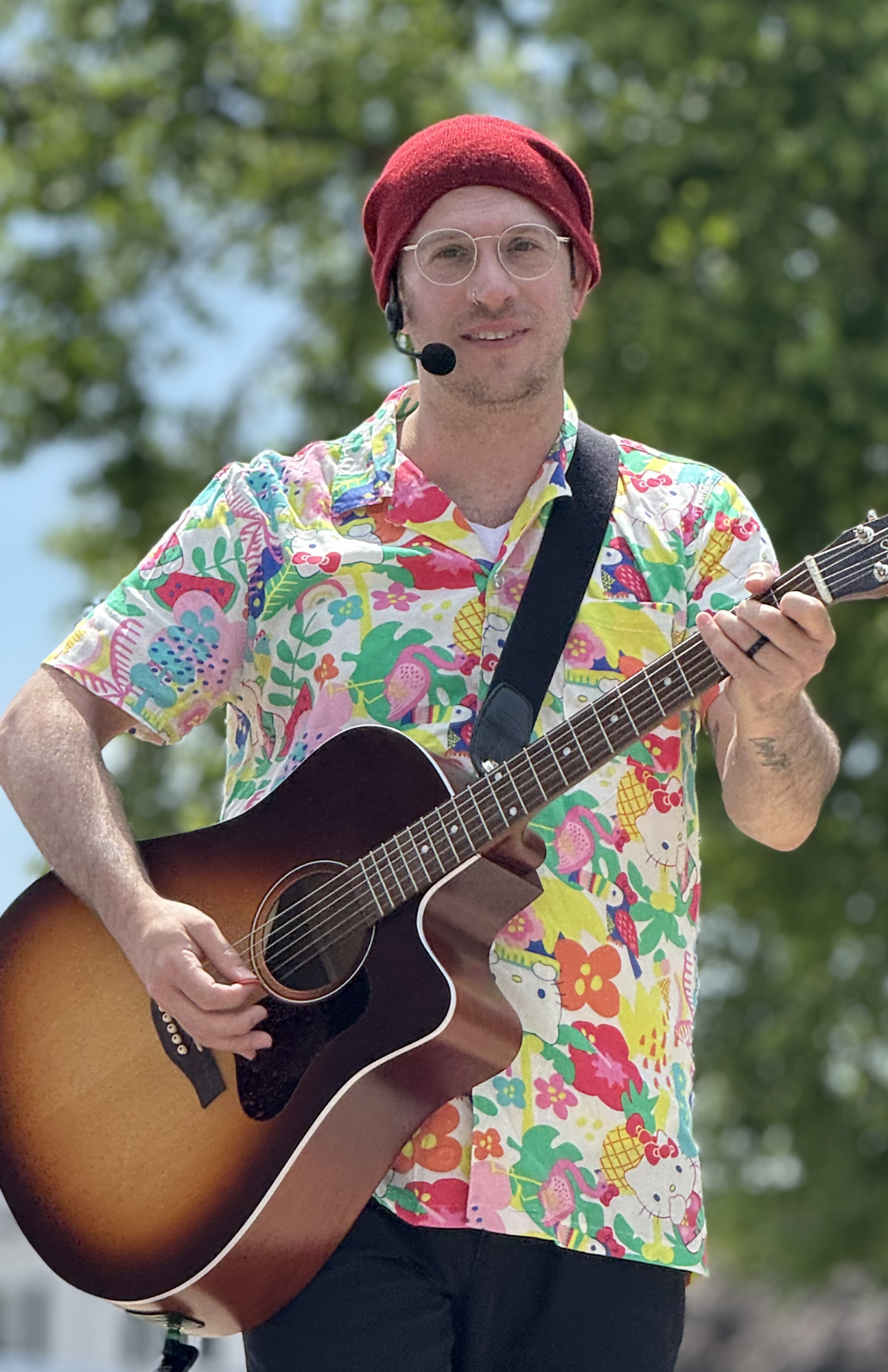
Divinity Roxx (left), Genevieve Goings (center), and Mr. Jeff (“right”).

Personnel adapted from Apple Music and Spotify.

- Fyütch – primary artist, vocals, composer, producer
- Aura V – primary artist, vocals, composer
- VanVan – featured artist, vocals, composer
- Genevieve Goings – featured artist, vocals, composer
- Mega Ran – featured artist, vocals, composer
- Kaitlin Becker – featured artist, vocals, composer
- Divinity Roxx – featured artist, vocals, composer
- Kymberly Stewart – featured artist, vocals, composer
- Mr. Jeff – vocalist
- Ni-Emah Bugg – vocalist
- Yeshak Pellot – vocalist
- Roy Moye III – vocalist
- Reggie McConneheaugh – composer
- Deanna Hawkins – composer, keyboards, producer
- Angel Martinez – composer
- Basil T. Morgan – keyboards
- Harold M. Simmons – saxophone
- Larry Jenkins – trumpet
- Ariel Wallace – trumpet
- Tariq Tucker – bass
- Candra R – bass
- Jordan Chase Sr. – guitar
- Willie Howell – drums
- Lucy Kalantari – producer
- Ron Vento – recording engineer
- Ryan Frederick – mastering engineer
- Michael Gamarano – mixing engineer, mastering engineer
- Eric Racy – mixing engineer, mastering engineer
