= List of political hip-hop artists =

In hip hop music, political hip hop, or political rap, is a form developed in the 1980s, inspired by 1970s political preachers such as The Last Poets and Gil Scott-Heron. Public Enemy were the first political hip hop group to gain commercial success. Grandmaster Flash and the Furious Five released the first sociopolitical rap song in 1982, named “The Message”, which inspired many rappers to address social and political topics.

== List ==
Name	Years active	Continent	Country	Origin (city, state)	Language	Main concerns
99 Posse	1991–2005, 2009–present	Europe	Italy	Naples, Campania	Italian	Left-wing activism, antifascism
A Tribe Called Quest	1985–1998, 2006–2013, 2015–2017	North America	US	Queens, New York	English	Systemic racism, education
Ab-Soul	2003–present	North America	US	Los Angeles, California	English	
Ace Hood	2006–present	North America	US	Deerfield Beach, Florida	English	
Aesop Rock	1996–present	North America	US	Northport, New York	English	
Akala	2004–present	Europe	UK	Archway, London, Greater London	English	
Akir	2003–present	North America	US	Buffalo, New York	English	
Advanced Chemistry	1987–present	Europe	Germany	Heidelberg, Baden-Württemberg	German	
Assassin	1991–2011	Europe	France	Paris, Île-de-France	French	
Atmosphere	1989–present	North America	US	Minneapolis, Minnesota	English	
Balen	2012-present	Asia	Nepal	Kathmandu, Nepal	Nepali	
B. Dolan	1999–present	North America	US	Providence, Rhode Island	English	
B.o.B	2006–present	North America	US	Decatur, Georgia	English	
Beogradski Sindikat	1999–present	Europe	Serbia	Belgrade, Belgrade	Serbian	
Big K.R.I.T.	2005–present	North America	US	Meridian, Mississippi	English	
Binary Star	1998–present	North America	US	Pontiac, Michigan	English	
BLKD	2010–present	Asia	Philippines	Naic, Cavite	Filipino	
Blood of Abraham	1993–2000	North America	US	Los Angeles, California	English	
Blue Scholars	2002–present	North America	US	Seattle, Washington	English	
Boogie Down Productions	1985–1992	North America	US	South Bronx, New York	English	
Braintax	1990–2008	Europe	UK	Leeds, West Yorkshire	English	
Brother Ali	1998–present	North America	US	Minneapolis, Minnesota	English	
Bryson Gray	2019–present	North America	US	High Point, North Carolina	English	
Corporate Avenger	1998–2005	North America	US	Huntington Beach, California	English	Politics, knowledge, spirituality
Chance the Rapper	2012–present	North America	US	Chicago, Illinois	English	
Common	1991–present	North America	US	Chicago, Illinois	English	
Common Market	2005–2009	North America	US	Seattle, Washington	English	
Cupcakke	2012–present	North America	US	Chicago, Illinois	English	Racism, LGBT, sexism, feminism
The Coup	1991–Present	North America	US	Oakland, California	English	
Capital STEEZ	2009–2012	North America	US	Brooklyn, New York City, New York	English	
Da Lench Mob	1989–1995	North America	US	Los Angeles, California	English	
Dälek	1998–2011, 2015–present	North America	US	Newark, New Jersey	English	
DAM	1999–present	Asia	Israel	Lod	Arabic, English, Hebrew	Israeli-Palestinian conflict, poverty
Dave	2016–present	Europe	UK	Streatham, London	English	
David Banner	1994–present	North America	US	Jackson, Mississippi	English	
Dead Prez	1996–present	North America	US	New York, New York	English	Systemic racism, misogyny, prison industry, poverty, crime, education, health
Deep Dickollective	2000–2008	North America	US	San Francisco, California	English	LGBT
Denzel Curry	2011–present	North America	US	Carol City, Florida	English	
Diabolic	2003–present	North America	US	Huntington Station, New York	English	
Diamondog	1998–present	Africa	Angola	Luanda, Luanda	Portuguese	
The Disposable Heroes of Hiphoprisy	1990–1993	North America	US	San Francisco, California	English	
Dizzy Wright	2010–present	North America	US	Las Vegas, Nevada	English	
The Dope Poet Society	1995–present	North America	Canada	Toronto, Ontario	English	Criticism of right-wing politics, war, and racism.
Eminem	1988–present	North America	US	Detroit, Michigan	English	
Eyedea	1993–2010	North America	US	Saint Paul, Minnesota	English	
Flobots	2005–present	North America	US	Denver, Colorado	English	
Fyütch	2005–present	North America	US	Nashville, Tennessee	English	
Gil Scott-Heron	1969–2011	North America	US	Chicago, Illinois	English	
The Goats						
Greydon Square						
Hasan Salaam						
The Herd	2001–present	Australia	Australia	Sydney, New South Wales	English	
Hichkas		Asia	Iran	Tehran	Persian	
Hi-Rez	2001-present	North America	US	Florida	English	Anti-woke, patriotism, freedom of speech, anti political correctness, conspiracy theories
Hopsin		North America	US	Los Angeles, California	English	
Hostyle Gospel						
Ice Cube	1984–present	North America	US	Compton, California	English	
Ice-T	1982–present	North America	US	Los Angeles, California	English	Especially on the albums The Iceberg/Freedom of Speech... Just Watch What You Say!, OG Original Gangster and Home Invasion. His single LP Killers (1984) was amongst the earliest political raps.
Ill Bill	1986–present	North America	US	Glenwood Houses, Brooklyn, New York	English	
Immortal Technique	2000–present	North America	US	Harlem, New York, New York	English	Far left activist - anti-capitalist, comments on systemic racism, pro Palestine, supports communism and has socialist values of class struggle, socialist revolution and the proletariat.
J. Cole	2007–present	North America	US	Fayetteville, North Carolina	English	
Jay Electronica	1995–present	North America	US	New Orleans, Louisiana	English	
Jay Rock	2003–present	North America	US	Los Angeles, California	English	
Jedi Mind Tricks	1993–present	North America	US	Philadelphia, Pennsylvania	English	
Jehst	1998–present	Europe	UK	London, Greater London	English	
Joey Badass	2010–present	North America	US	New York, New York	English	Systemic racism, slavery, health
JPEGMafia	2016–present	North America	US	Baltimore , Maryland	English	Racism, police brutality, criticisms of right-wing politics
Juba Kalamka	1988–present	North America	US	Chicago, Illinois	English	LGBT Hip Hop
Kendrick Lamar	2004–present	North America	US	Compton, California	English	Systemic racism
Kanye West	1996–present	North America	US	Chicago, Illinois	English	See Views of Kanye West
Keny Arkana	1996–present	Europe	France	Marseille	French	
Killer Mike	1995–present	North America	US	Atlanta, Georgia	English	
K.I.Z	2000–present	Europe	Germany	Berlin	German	Criticism of capitalism, Antifascism
Kneecap	2017-present	Europe	Ireland	West Belfast, Belfast, Northern Ireland	Irish, English	Irish republicanism
Kolateral	2019–present	Asia	Philippines	Manila, Metro Manila	Filipino, English	Drug War, Fascism, Poverty
KRS-One	1985–present	North America	US	South Bronx, New York City, New York	English	Systemic racism, education, police brutality
Kutt Calhoun	1993–present	North America	US	Kansas City, Missouri	English	
La Familia	1996–2011, 2017–present	Europe	Romania	Sălăjan, Bucharest	Romanian	
Lauryn Hill	1989–present	North America	US	East Orange, New Jersey	English	Systemic racism, integrity
Lecrae	2004–present	South America	US	Houston, Texas	English	
Little Simz	2010–present	Europe	UK	Islington, London, Greater London	English	
Logic	2010–2020, 2021–present	North America	US	Gaithersburg, Maryland	English	Suicide Awareness and prevention
Looptroop Rockers		Europe	Sweden		English	
The Lost Children of Babylon						
Lowkey	2001–2012, 2016–present	Europe	UK	London, Greater London	English	
Lupe Fiasco	2000–present	North America	US	Chicago, Illinois	English	
Macklemore	2000–present	North America	US	Seattle, Washington	English	
Manny Phesto	2010–present	North America	US	Minneapolis, Minnesota	English	
Manu Militari						
Marlon Craft	2015–present	North America	US	New York, New York	English	
M.I.A.	2000–present	Europe	UK	Hounslow, London, Greater London	English	
Michael Franti	1986–present	North America	US	San Francisco, California	English	
Mr. Lif						
Mos Def	1994–present	North America	US	Brooklyn, New York	English	Systemic racism, police brutality, corporate greed, violence, Islamophobia, torture, sexual violence, murder, slavery, education, integrity
Narcy						
Nas	1991–present	North America	US	Queens, NYC, New York	English	Systemic racism, education
N.W.A.	1987–1991, 1999–2001, 2015–2016	North America	US	Compton, CA	English	Racism, institutional racism, excessive policing
Nipsey Hussle	2005–2019	North America	US	Los Angeles, California	English	Anti-Trump
Noname		North America	US	Chicago, Illinois	English	
Olmeca		North America	US	Los Angeles, California	English, Spanish	
Paraziții	1995–present	Europe	Romania		Romanian	political humor
Paris	1989–present	North America	US	Oakland, California	English	
The Perceptionists						
Poor Righteous Teachers						Systemic racism, crime and violence, education, integrity
Promoe		Europe	Sweden		English, Swedish	
Psycho Realm						
Public Enemy	1982–present	North America	US	Long Island, New York	English	Systemic racism, slavery
Rage Against the Machine (rap metal)	1991–2000, 2007–2011	North America	US	Los Angeles, California	English	Systemic racism, white supremacy, racism, hate crimes, murder, corporate and political greed, wealth inequality, poverty, antifascist
Ra Scion		North America	US		English	
R.A. the Rugged Man		North America	US	Lawrence, Massachusetts	English	
Ras Kass	1994–present	North America	US	Los Angeles, California	English	
Rebel Diaz						
Reconcile						
Rockin' Squat	1985–present	Europe	France	Paris, Île-de-France	French	
The Roots	1987–present	North America	US	Philadelphia, Pennsylvania	English	
Run The Jewels	2013–present	North America	US	ATL, GA / NYC, NY	English	
Sabac Red		North America	US		English	
Sage Francis	1996–present	North America	US	Providence, Rhode Island	English	
Scarface	1988–present	South America	US	Houston, Texas	English	
Shahin Najafi						
slowthai	2015–present	Europe	UK	Abington, Northamptonshire	English	
Sole		North America	US	Portland, Maine	English	
Street Academics	2009–present	Asia	India	Kerala	Malayalam, English, Tamil	
Street Sweeper Social Club					English	
Talib Kweli	1996–present	North America	US	Brooklyn, NYC, New York	English	Systemic racism, white supremacy, misogyny, women's rights, sexual violence, Islamophobia, antisemitism, xenophobia, police brutality, hate crimes, gun violence, war, oil industry, reparations, education, integrity, antifascist, anti-bigotry
Terminator X	1986–1988		US		English	
Tom MacDonald	2006—present	North America	Canada	Edmonton, Alberta	English	
Toomaj Salehi	2006-2022	Asia & Europe	Iran	Gerd Bisheh, Chaharmaha and Bakhtiari, Iran	Persian	
Tragedy Khadafi	1985–present	North America	US	Queens, NYC, New York	English	
Tupac Shakur	1987–1996	North America	US	Harlem, NYC, New York	English	Racism, police brutality, misogyny, women's rights
The Visionaries						
Saul Williams						
Urthboy	1998–present	Australia	Australia	Sydney	English	
Valete	1997–present	Europe	Portugal	Benfica, Lisbon	Portuguese	
Vic Mensa	2009–present	North America	US	Chicago, Illinois	English	
Vince Staples	2008–present	North America	US	Long Beach	English	
Vinnie Paz	1993–present	North America	US	Philadelphia, Pennsylvania	English	
X Clan	1989–1995, 2006–present	North America	US	Harlem, NYC, New York	English	
Yama Buddha	2002-2017	Asia & Europe	Nepal & UK	Ghattekulo-32, Kathmandu & Ruislip, London	English, Nepali	
Name	Years active	Continent	Country	Origin (city, state)	Language	Main concerns

== See also ==
- Hip hop activism
