= I've Got Heart =

Studio album by Mr. Jeff
- Released: August 21, 2026
- Length: 39:14
- Label: Jeff Klemm Music
- Producers: Jeff Klemm; Drew Louis

Singles from I've Got Heart
- 1. "Keep Swimming (featuring Snooknuk)" Released: June 12, 2026; 2. "Patience" Released: July 31, 2026

I've Got Heart is a studio album by American children's musician Mr. Jeff released on August 21, 2026. The children's album has twelve tracks, with features from Snooknuk, Flor Bromley, and Kymberly Stewart.

== Composition ==
I've Got Heart is the fourth studio album by Mr. Jeff. Mr. Jeff noted his experience motivating kids at a show in Youngstown, Ohio, which inspired him to create an album with themes of hard work and perseverance. Snooknuk, Flor Bromley, and Kymberly Stewart feature on the album, and "Keep Swimming" and "What Is Indigo?" were produced with Mr. Jeff's brother Drew Louis. On "Welcome To The World", it features the ultrasound heartbeat of Mr. Jeff's daughter throughout the song.

== Track listing ==
Track listing and credits adapted from Apple Music and Spotify.

I've Got Heart
No.	Title	Writer(s)	Producer(s)	Length
1.	"I've Got Heart!"	Jeffrey Christopher Klemm	Jeff Klemm	3:05
2.	"Keep Swimming" (featuring Snooknuk)	Klemm; LaJuana Pigram Jacobs	Klemm; Drew Louis	2:53
3.	"Compliment Sandwich" (featuring Flor Bromley)	Klemm; Flor Bromley	Klemm	3:27
4.	"What Is Indigo?"	Klemm; Drew Louis	Klemm; Louis	3:16
5.	"Patience"	Klemm	Klemm	2:38
6.	"Show Up, Work Hard"	Klemm	Klemm	3:08
7.	"Make The Best Choice" (featuring Kymberly Stewart)	Klemm	Klemm	3:52
8.	"Daylight Saving"	Klemm	Klemm	4:01
9.	"You Can Do Anything!"	Klemm	Klemm	3:22
10.	"Threenager"	Klemm	Klemm	2:46
11.	"Welcome To The World"	Klemm	Klemm	2:39
12.	"I Will Take Good Care Of You"	Klemm	Klemm	4:02
Total length:				39:14

== Personnel ==
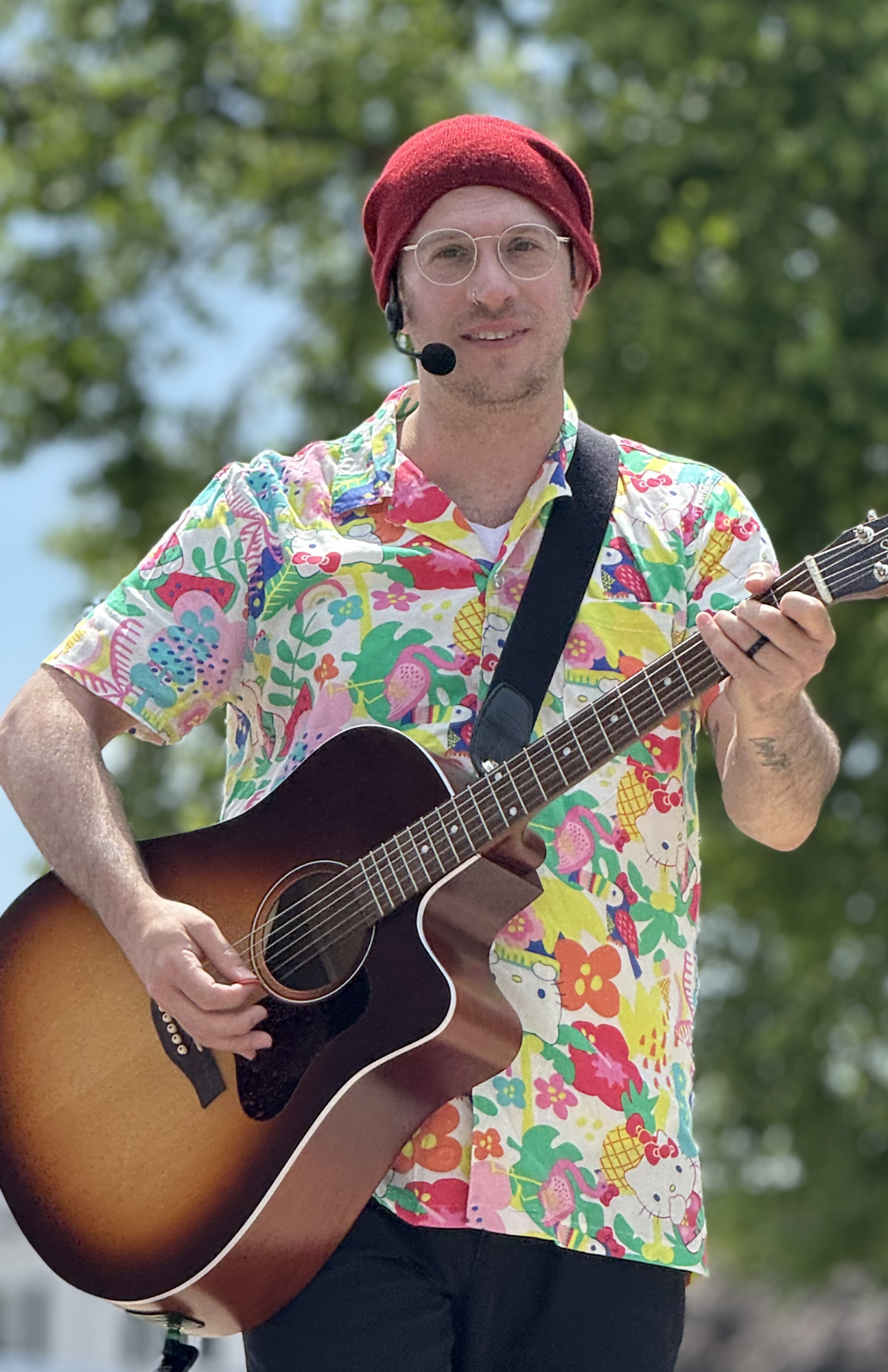
Mr. Jeff performing in Cuyahoga Falls in 2024.

Personnel adapted from Apple Music and Spotify.

- Jeff Klemm – primary artist, composer, producer
- Snooknuk – featured artist, composer
- Flor Bromley – featured artist, composer
- Drew Louis – composer, producer
- Kymberly Stewart – featured artist
- Benjamin Patrick – engineer
- Erik Schnell – engineer
- Robert Keith – engineer
- Lucy Kalantari – engineer
- Michael Gamarano – mastering engineer
- Silas Klemm – background vocals
- Juniper Klemm – background vocals
- Jonah Klemm – background vocals
- Jillian Klemm – background vocals
- Robert Murphy – violin
- Charissa Dowe Rouse – violin
- Eva Gerard – viola
- Darius Kalantari – cello
- Kevin Gatzke – flute
- Adam Grom – flute, saxophone
- Kaiden Bos – saxophone
- Sarah Behal – clarinet
- Tommy Lehman – trumpet
- Matt Garrett – trumpet
- Tim Coyne – trumpet
- Max Brady – trombone
- Nathan Frimel – tuba
- Natalie Martin – bass drum, snare drum
