= Snooknuk =

American children's music artist

Background information
- Also known as: Cheri Moon
- Born: LaJuana Pigram
- Origin: Memphis, Tennessee, U.S.
- Genres: Children's music, R&B, soul, pop
- Occupations: Singer, songwriter, recording artist
- Years active: 2011–present
- Website: snooknukmusic.com

Cheri Moon, known professionally as Snooknuk, is an American children's music artist, singer-songwriter, and performer whose music blends soul, hip-hop, gospel, and educational family music. Her third children's album, All in Good Time (2026), was nominated for Best Children's Music Album at the 69th Annual Grammy Awards.

Born in Memphis, Tennessee, and based in Los Angeles, California, Moon previously released the children's albums Once Upon a Day: A Little Less Tears (2013) and Once Upon a Day: A Lot More Fun (2014).

In 2014, Moon opened Snooknuk Play, a children's performing arts café and play space on Larchmont Boulevard in Los Angeles. The venue hosted music, dance, and educational programming for children and families.

Moon also contributed to All One Tribe (2021) as part of 1 Tribe Collective, whose album received a nomination for Best Children's Music Album at the 64th Annual Grammy Awards in 2022.

== Early life ==
Moon was born in Memphis, Tennessee, where she was exposed to gospel, soul, and rhythm and blues music from an early age. She later moved to New York City, where she developed her skills as a singer, songwriter, and performer, before relocating to Los Angeles, California. After becoming a mother, Moon began writing and performing children's music under the stage name Snooknuk.

== Career ==
=== Children's music ===
Following the release of Once Upon a Day: A Little Less Tears in 2013 and Once Upon a Day: A Lot More Fun in 2014, Snooknuk focused on live interactive performances for children and families throughout the Los Angeles area. Her programs combined music, dance, puppetry, movement, and educational themes aimed at preschool and early elementary audiences.

Snooknuk regularly performed at preschools, libraries, and community venues, including multiple appearances at branches of the Los Angeles Public Library system.

She also presented Snooknuk the Robot Puppet Show at family-oriented events and community spaces in Los Angeles.

In interviews, Moon described Snooknuk as a project designed to promote positive values, creativity, and emotional development through music and interactive performance.

In August 2026, Snooknuk featured on Mr. Jeff's album I've Got Heart.

Snooknuk released her 3rd Studio album All in Good Time on August 14th 2026

Following its release on August 14, 2026, All in Good Time debuted at number one on the U.S. iTunes Children's Albums chart. The album was produced by Lucy Kalantari and features collaborations with Kwamé, Pierce Freelon, Divinity Roxx, Rissi Palmer, Jabali Afrika, and the Stax Music Academy Choir.

The album's song "Do Re Mi", featuring Kwamé, Pierce Freelon, and the Stax Music Academy Choir, was accompanied by a music video directed by Moon and filmed at the Stax Museum of American Soul Music in Memphis. The collaboration received coverage in the Memphis Flyer, including the feature "One Funky Do Re Mi" and an installment of its "Music Video Monday" series.

In July 2026, the Memphis City Council approved a resolution honoring Moon for her contributions to music, children's education, and the empowerment of children and families. Sponsored by Councilwoman Jerri Green, the resolution recognized her North Memphis upbringing and professional music career.

On November 16, 2026, All in Good Time received a nomination for Best Children's Music Album at the 69th Annual Grammy Awards, marking Snooknuk's first Grammy nomination as a solo artist. The nomination followed her earlier participation in 1 Tribe Collective's Grammy-nominated album All One Tribe (2021).

=== Snooknuk Play ===
In 2014, Moon opened Snooknuk Play, a children's performing arts café and indoor play space located on Larchmont Boulevard in Los Angeles.

The venue combined music, dance, arts programming, and supervised play activities for young children and families. Snooknuk Play was featured in several Los Angeles parenting and lifestyle publications as a notable indoor play destination for children.

Snooknuk Play attracted celebrity families and was featured in national media, including a 2016 People magazine article covering a celebrity mannequin challenge video featuring Beyoncé and former members of Destiny's Child filmed at the venue.

Snooknuk Play later closed its physical location, though Moon continued producing children's music and live family entertainment programs.

== Awards and nominations ==
Year	Award	Category	Nominated work	Result
2022	Grammy Awards	Best Children's Music Album	All One Tribe (as part of 1 Tribe Collective)	Nominated
2027	Grammy Awards	Best Children's Music Album	All in Good Time (Snooknuk)	Nominated

== Discography ==
=== Albums ===
- Once Upon a Day: A Little Less Tears (2013)
- Once Upon a Day: A Lot More Fun (2014)
- All in Good Time (2026)

=== Collaborative projects ===
- All One Tribe – 1 Tribe Collective (2021)
- ”Keep Swimming” – Mr. Jeff (2026)
