= Fyütch =

American rapper

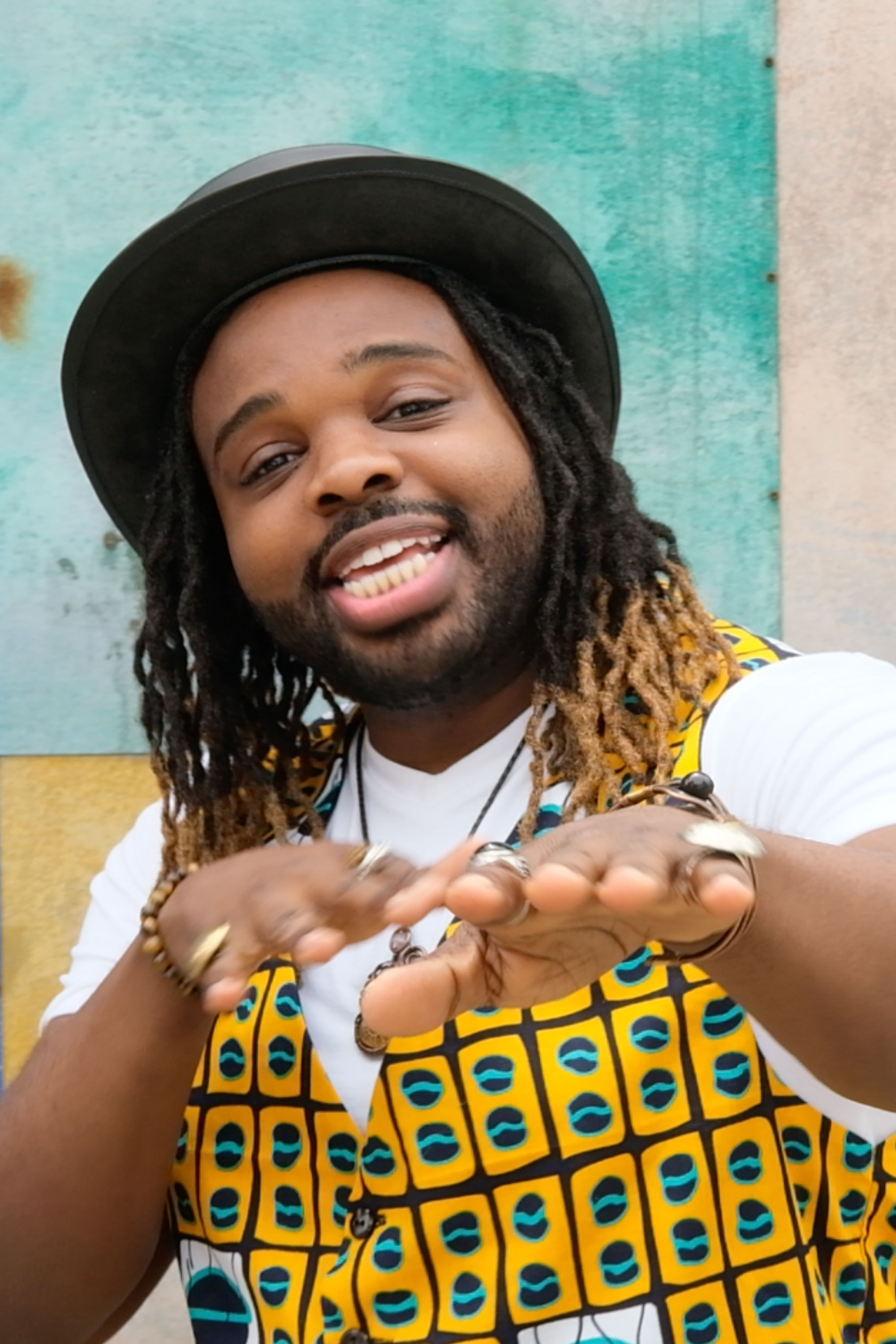

Background information
- Born: Harold Michael Simmons II; September 17, 1988 (age 38); Gary, Indiana
- Genres: Hip Hop, Soul, R&B, Children's Music
- Occupations: Rapper; Singer; Songwriter; Record producer; Composer; Performer; Entertainer
- Years active: 2005–present
- Website: www.fyutch.com

Harold Michael Simmons II (born September 17, 1988), better known by his stage name Fyütch, stylized as FYÜTCH (or FYUTCH) (formerly named Future and Mr. Flattop), is a Grammy-winning rapper, singer, songwriter, record producer, composer and educator best known for his social justice inspired songs. His album Harmony with his daughter Aura V, won the Grammy Award for Best Children's Music Album at the 68th Annual Grammy Awards on February 1, 2026, making Aura the youngest individual Grammy Winner in history.

== Early life and education ==
Simmons was born in Gary, Indiana on September 17, 1988. At age seven, he won the citywide speech contest and began gaining local popularity as a public speaker. According to his 2019 TEDx Talk, Simmons performed speeches at various events as a child, including Washington, D.C., on the steps of the Congress building. When he was eight, his family moved to Nashville, Tennessee. In 2006, he graduated from Hume-Fogg High School, where he played alto saxophone in the jazz band and volunteered for several local youth organizations. He then attended Belmont University, where he became a member of the Phi Beta Sigma fraternity, and graduated in 2011 from Belmont's Mike Curb College of Entertainment and Music Business.

== Career ==
=== 2006–2009: Career beginnings ===
In 2006, Simmons and a few of his friends started a hip hop and soul band called The Legendary Biscuits and Gravy. They were nominated for Southern Entertainment Awards Best Indy R&B Artist of the Year in 2007. They quickly gained notoriety in Nashville and opened for Kanye West, GZA, and Nappy Roots.

In 2009, Simmons released his first solo EP entitled The Sci Fly EP under the moniker Future The Artist. It received good reviews and was nominated for a Nashville Music award for Best Urban Recording of the Year. Following the EP, he released the Overnight Mixtape series, six mixtapes recorded during overnight studio sessions. The Nashville Scene spotlighted the Overnight Mixtapes, stating that Future the Artist dominated the local underground hip hop scene.

=== 2012–2014: From Future to Fyütch ===
In September 2012, Future the Artist changed his stage name to Fyütch to avoid confusion with Atlanta rapper Future. March 2014, Nardwuar interviewed Future revealing that Simmons did in fact use the moniker first. "There was another Future that was out there. Started in 2003. It was this gentleman right here, Mr. Flattop, from Nashville, TN. And he originally was called Future, then he changed his name to Mr. Flattop, and now he's called FYÜTCH. He actually was called Future in 2003 but he had to change his name because you got big." Fyütch released a remix of Future's hit single "Move That Dope," and titled it "The Other Future (Don't Sell Dope)." HipHopDX premiered the song as a "Future, YG, and Migos Diss". But Fyütch later refuted that claim."

=== 2015–2018: Country Kendrick, MTV, and New York ===
August 2015, Fyütch moved to New York City and won several freestyle rap competitions like Supreme Bars and End of The Weak MC Challenge (aka EODUB).

In summer 2017, Fyütch began filming a weekly web series called Fyütchology, blending comedy, parody, and social commentary. The series gained national coverage on Episode 12 "Country Kendrick", where Fyütch remakes Kendrick Lamar songs in a country music style. The skit went viral and MTV featured it on Total Request Live hosted by D.C. Young Fly and Rita Ora. Mass Appeal (media) covered the success, "nothing is currently quite as thought-provoking as watching the artist in a leather vest and cowboy hat belting out his own honky-tonk rendition of "Humble."

Fyütch started an organization called Level Up Showcase in 2018 that hosted monthly concerts for aspiring youth artists and musicians. He received the Open Call grant from The Shed for emerging artists. In 2020, he won the BRIO Award from the Bronx Council on the Arts for outstanding Vocal Music Performance.

=== Since 2021: Family and children's music ===
January 18, 2021, Fyütch released "Black Women in History", a song about impactful and powerful Black women throughout American history, like Fannie Lou Hamer, Ida B Wells, and Stacey Abrams. The song features Rissi Palmer and Snooknuk, and went to No. 1 on Sirius XM Radio Kids Place Live. He released seven singles leading to his debut family music album in July 2021, Family Tree, including the song "Pick It Up" released in April for Earth Day. NowThis News, Yahoo! News and MSN covered the song, highlighting Fyütch's eco-friendly rap promoting sustainability.

"Family Reunion" featuring Divinity Roxx also premiered on the All One Tribe album in June 2021 along with twenty-four Black Family music artists known as 1 Tribe Collective. The album was nominated for Best Children's Music Album for the 2022 Grammy Awards.

January 17, 2022 (MLK Day), Fyütch appeared on The Today Show with Craig Melvin on the "Dad's Got This" segment to highlight his album Family Tree and his role as father, artist, and educator.

In 2024, Fyütch became a host and voice actor in the children’s podcast Once Upon a Beat, produced by Tinkercast (the creators of Wow in the World) and distributed by Wondery. In the series, Fyütch (as “DJ Fyütch”) reimagines classic stories through hip-hop-inspired narration and music alongside his turntable sidekick Baby Scratch and a revolving cast of characters. He also wrote and produced the show’s theme song. The podcast has released at least 12 episodes and has received positive attention for its creative blend of music, storytelling, and educational themes.

=== Daddy - Daughter album Harmony ===
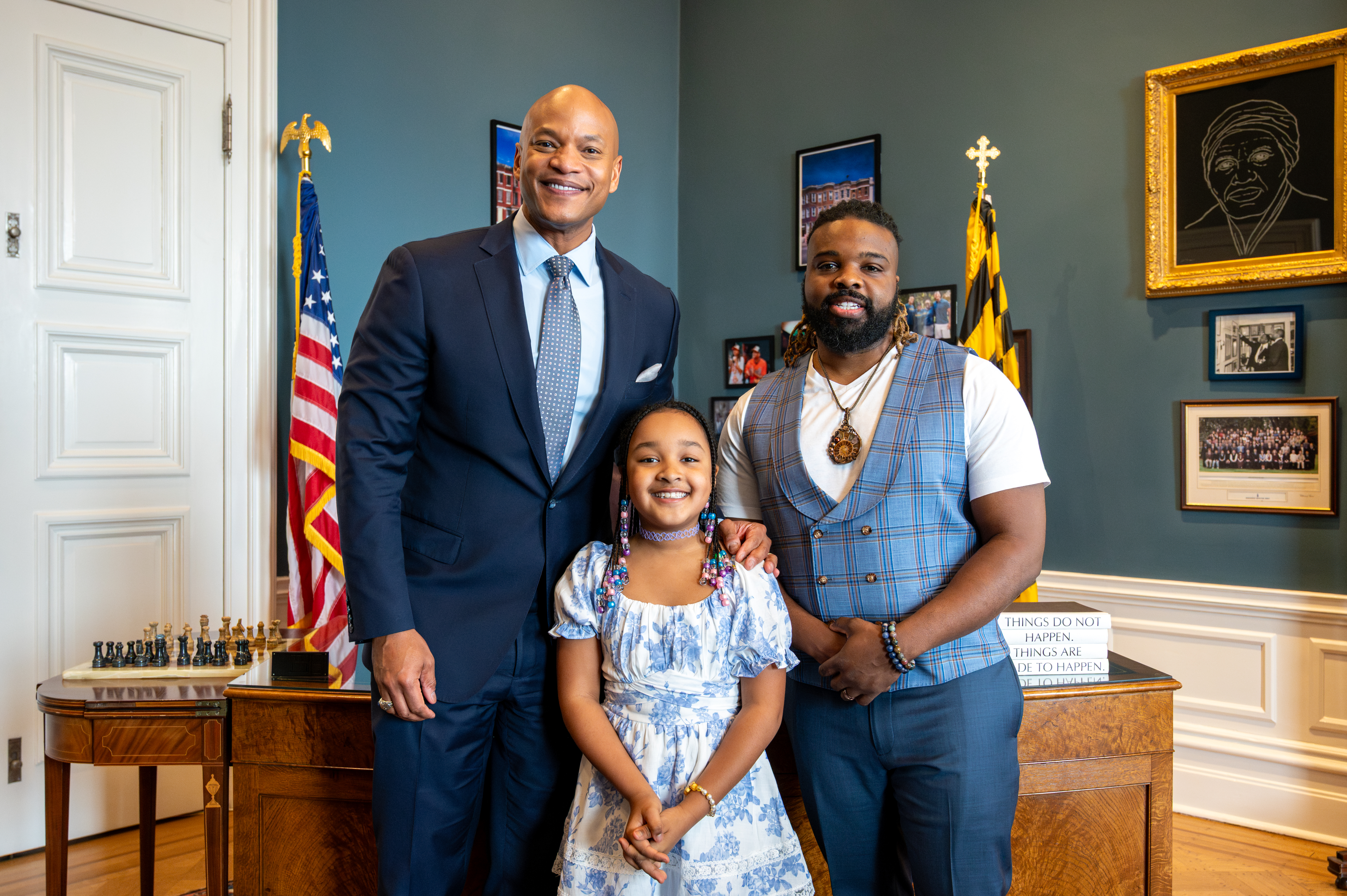
Fyütch and Aura V with Maryland governor Wes Moore, 2026

February 2024, Fyütch began releasing music with his 5 year old daughter Aura V, first with the positive affirmations song "I Am Love, I Am Light" followed by the viral track "My Daddy" featuring child rapper/actor VanVan. The title track "Harmony" won multiple songwriting awards, including American Songwriter Song Contest and International Songwriting Competition. The album was released on May 23, 2025, and supported by a nationwide tour that included performances at Lollapalooza on the Kidzapalooza stage. In November 2025, Harmony was nominated for the Grammy Award for Best Children's Music Album, leading to television interviews on major outlets like The Today Show. The album went on to win the Grammy, and Aura V became the youngest individually named Grammy winner in history.

== Awards ==
- 2026 Grammy Award winner for Best Children's Music Album
- 2025 Winner - USA Songwriting Competition - Best Children's Song - "Harmony"
- 2024 1st Place - International Songwriting Competition - Children's Song - "Harmony"
- 2024 1st Place - American Songwriter Song Contest - Children's Song - "Harmony"
- 2024 Finalist - John Lennon Songwriting Contest - Children's Song - "Harmony"
- 2021 Grammy Award Nominee for Best Children's Music Album (with 1 Tribe Collective)
- 2020 Winner of the Bronx Recognizes Its Own (BRIO) Award - Bronx Council on the Arts
- 2018 Recipient of The Shed Open Call Grant for Emerging Artists
- 2016 Winner of Supreme Bars Producer Tournament in New York City (December)
- 2016 Winner of End of The Weak MC Challenge in New York City (April)
- 2016 Winner of Supreme Bars MC Tournament in New York City (January)
- 2015 Winner of Supreme Bars MC Tournament in New York City (October, December)
- 2009 Nashville Music Award Nominee (Best Urban Recording of the Year)
- 2007 Southern Entertainment Award Nominee w/ Biscuits and Gravy (Best Indy R&B Artist)
- 2007 and 2008 Belmont University Urban Showcase winner

== Discography ==
=== Albums ===
List of studio albums with selected details
Title	Details
Mr. Flattop	Released: September 24, 2012; Label: Self-released; Formats: CD, Digital download
All One Tribe (by 1 Tribe Collective)	Released: June 19, 2021; Label: Aya World, Tuff Gong International; Formats: Digital download
Family Tree	Released: July 16, 2021; Label: Self-released; Formats: CD, Digital download
Harmony (with Aura V)	Released: May 23, 2025; Label: Self-released; Formats: CD, Vinyl, Digital download

=== EPs ===
List of EPs with selected details
Title	Details
The Sci Fly EP	Released: April 13, 2009; Label: Self-released; Formats: Digital download
Peace, Love & FYÜTCH	Released: April 22, 2013; Label: Self-released; Formats: Digital download
Philosophy of Love	Released: August 4, 2016; Label: Self-released; Formats: Digital download
Freakazoid (with Boba Sweat)	Released: April 11, 2017; Label: DESKPOP; Formats: Digital download
Freakazoid Remixes (with Boba Sweat)	Released: August 22, 2017; Label: DESKPOP; Formats: Digital download
Love and Light (with Boba Sweat)	Released: October 9, 2018; Label: DESKPOP; Formats: Digital download

=== Notable Singles ===
- "Greatest Song Ever (feat. Genevieve Goings)" [2025]
- "Harmony" (with Aura V) [2024]
- "My Daddy" (with Aura V and VanVan) [2024]
- "I Am Love, I Am Light" (with Aura V) [2024]
- "Black Women in History" [2021]
- "Pick It Up" [2021]
- "Juneteenth" [2021]
