= Professor D =

- Also known as: ProfessorD.us, ProfD, Damon Sajnani
- Born: Damon Chandru Burchell; June 12, 1976 (age 49)
- Origin: Toronto, Ontario, Canada
- Genres: Hip Hop
- Occupation(s): Emcee, rapper, professor, author,
- Years active: 1995–2008
- Labels: Justus League Records

Damon Burchell, better known by the aliases Professor D, ProfessorD.us, and Damon Sajnani, is a Canadian rapper and former assistant professor based in the United States. He was the lead vocalist of The Dope Poet Society and taught African Studies at the University of Wisconsin–Madison as a professor where he taught courses on Hip Hop and Politics in Africa and around the world. He was the inaugural Nasir Jones Hip Hop Fellow at the W. E. B. Du Bois Research Institute at Harvard University in 2014-15. He is known for rapping about social issues and global politics with sophisticated rhyme structures and "tongue twisting flows." Marcyliena Morgan, Executive Director of Harvard's Hiphop Archive, says Professor D's work "represents the innovations and creativity of hiphop at its best." Professor D has released several critically acclaimed albums and published numerous scholarly articles, however following criminal charges related to his time at UW, his professorship was terminated.

In December 2016, Wisconsin legislators Stephen Nass and Dave Murphy asked UW to fire Burchell and cancel his course titled The Problem of Whiteness which the legislators maintain is "adding to the polarization of the races in the state," and which they believed was premised on the idea that white people are racist. The course description states that "whiteness studies considers how race is experienced by white people. It explores how they consciously and unconsciously perpetuate institutional racism and how this not only devastates communities of color but also perpetuates the oppression of most white folks along the lines of class and gender. In this class, we will ask what an ethical white identity entails, what it means to be #woke, and consider the journal Race Traitor's motto, 'treason to whiteness is loyalty to humanity.'"

In June 2021, a complaint was filed against Burchell by the university police at UW for violating statute UWS 18.08(6)(a) of the Wisconsin legislature. The statute states in part that "No person may ignore, bypass, circumvent, damage, interfere with, or attempt to deceive by fraudulent means, any university authorized security measure or monitoring device." Burchell was found guilty following a no contest plea in August 2021, and fined $200.50. That summer, Burchell's faculty page was scrubbed from the website of the UW African Studies Program.

Burchell was then charged with felony theft between $2500 to $5000 in September 2021. He was accused of violating of Wisconsin statute 943.20(1)(a) in May 2021, and was subsequently released on a $500 signature bond and ordered to have no unauthorized contact with any UW property. After missing a court appearance in January 2022, Burchell was the subject of a two-week bench warrant. The case was dismissed by Assistant District Attorney of Dane County in Wisconsin on June 12, 2023.
