= Choo Choo Soul =

Children's entertainment act

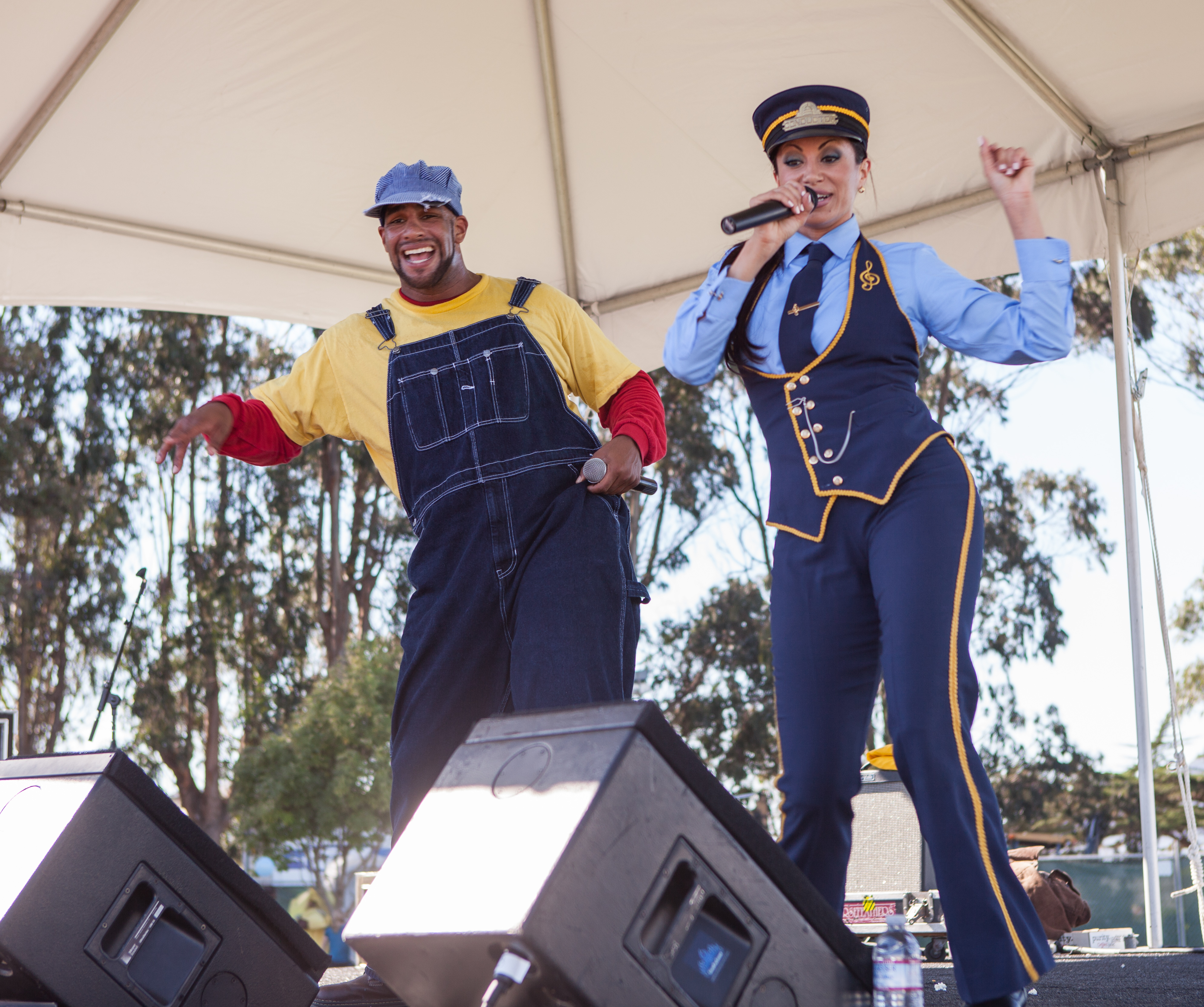
- Choo Choo Soul at the Kidaroo Music Festival in San Francisco, September 2010

Background information
- Genre: Children's
- Years active: 2004–present
- Label: Walt Disney
- Members: Genevieve Goings; Constantine "DC" Abramson

Choo Choo Soul, also known as Choo Choo Soul with Genevieve, is a children's entertainment act composed of Genevieve Goings and her partner Constantine "DC" Abramson, a dancer and beatboxer dressed as a railroad engineer and conductor, respectively.

== History and recordings ==
Choo Choo Soul began as a collaboration between video game developer Greg Johnson, recording engineer and sound designer Burke Trieschmann, and vocalist Genevieve Goings during dialogue recordings for ToeJam & Earl III: Mission to Earth, the first Xbox installment of the ToeJam & Earl video game franchise. Johnson created the concept and recorded melodies and accompaniment tracks onto his cellphone and e-mailed them to Treischmann to develop. Once in the studio, Goings provided vocals.

The act debuted in 2004 as a 16-track CD Baby studio album that described itself as "kids' music that won't drive parents crazy." It is now out of print.

On October 31, 2006, Walt Disney Records released Choo Choo Soul, a 12-track album available through the iTunes Store and other online music outlets. It features most of the same songs as the 2004 release.

In 2007, "Choo Choo Soul with Genevieve!" was honored with a Parents' Choice Award for children's television.

In May 2008, Disney released featured a two-disc set which consisted of the Choo Choo Soul album on CD, and a DVD featuring ten music videos.

== Disney Channel series ==
Beginning in May 2006, a series of Choo Choo Soul interstitial programs began airing in the United States during the Playhouse Disney programming block on the Disney Channel. The music video–style shorts feature Goings and D.C. performing Choo Choo Soul songs with a group of young children in a blend of live action and computer animation. Choo Choo Soul has including more premieres and has more dubs of the show than Hebrew, Spanish and Italian, including Hebrew dubs on Israeli Educational Television (now Kan Educational), the Spanish dub of the show between the airings on Univision blocks of Disney Junior shows and the Italian dubbed version of the show airing on Playhouse Disney (after reruns of Choo Choo Soul episodes airing on Disney Junior).

In July 2011, Choo Choo Soul filmed eight new video shorts, remaking Disney songs in their style for the new Disney Channel preschool block and 24/7 network Disney Junior. Genevieve also sings the network's theme song "I Wanna Go" along with 16 other short songs for the network. Genevieve Goings continues to write and record songs for Disney Junior, including holiday songs and nursery rhymes.

== Live concerts ==
Choo Choo Soul tours regularly across the U.S. and Canada.

Choo Choo Soul has performed live on several occasions in 2007, including September and October shows at the Disney-MGM Studios theme park at Walt Disney World Resort in Florida, a performance at the Boston Globe Children's Book Festival in Boston, Massachusetts on September 15 and several shows in June 2009 at Sesame Place located near Philadelphia. They have performed at SeaWorld Orlando in 2012 and 2013 at the "Just for Kids" Event in January.

Choo Choo Soul has been touring the U.S. and Canada from 2007, and was the opening act for the Imagination Movers during their Big Warehouse Tour in 2011. They toured 56 cities.

Choo Choo Soul also performed at the 2011 California State Fair in Sacramento.

Choo Choo Soul read two stories at the 2016 White House Easter Egg Roll.

Choo Choo Soul performed at Busch Gardens Tampa Bay on April 26–27, 2025. The performances were free with park admission and took place at the Stanleyville Theater.
