= Jihadism and hip-hop =

Islamist jihadisim within hip-hop music

While many Islamist jihadists view hip-hop negatively due to its Western origins, there have also been examples of hip-hop songs with pro-jihadist lyrics, and of jihadists embracing hip-hop and gangsta culture as a way of attracting Westerners to join their organizations. The phenomenon is sometimes known as "Jihad Cool" and includes music, clothing, magazine, videos and other media.

== Notable examples ==
German rapper Deso Dogg later took the names Abu Talha al-Almani and Abou Maleeq, and joined ISIL in 2014.

British-born Abdel-Majed Abdel Bary rapped under the name L Jinny, is the son of Egyptian militant Adel Abdel Bari. Jinny once tweeted a photo of himself holding a man's severed head, with the words "Chillin' with my homie or what's left of him."

One American rapper, Omar Hamaami, who later joined al-Shabaab, released a song with the lyrics "Bomb by bomb, blast by blast, only going to bring back the glorious past."

In 2006, Aki Nawaz of the group Fun-Da-Mental released an album with lyrics comparing Osama bin Laden to Che Guevara and depicting the Statue of Liberty as an Abu Ghraib prisoner.

== Analysis ==
Kamaludeen Mohamed Nasir's book, Representing Islam: Hip-hop of the September 11 Generation, states that the unproblematic internalisation of gangsta hip-hop has led to what these rappers are calling a G-had. The phenomenon of jihadi rap has been around since at least 2004, when the song "Dirty Kuffar" was released.

Anthropologist Scott Atran argues that the phenomenon results from a search for "sacred values" and what Edmund Burke called "the sublime"; a "quest for greatness, glory, eternal meaning in an inherently chaotic world".

Political historian Mohamed Mahmoud Ould Mohamedou argues in his book A Theory of ISIS - Political Violence and the Transformation of the Global Order that the choreography and the soundscape (notably the nasheeds) of the transnational re-imagined and 'remixed' violence of the Islamic State partly borrows from the urban culture of hip-hop.

Amil Khan has cited Douglas McCain as yet another example of this phenomenon, and said that both Islamism and gangsta rap foster a "sense of grievance towards wider society" and "focus on vengeance and fetishize violence as a way of redressing the balance". Khan says that while researching young Islamists in London, he found that they looked to the works of 50 Cent and Tupac Shakur for inspiration. Khan argues that what sets ISIL apart from other jihadist groups, and makes it far more dangerous as a result, is its ability to harness hip-hop to "bestow on its struggle a counter-culture sense of subversive 'cool' that mainstream political parties and even commercial brands might envy." ISIL's marketing methods and overall strategies are also reminiscent of those used by street gangs.

Hisham Aidi has written a book, Rebel Music: Race, Empire, and the New Muslim Youth Culture describing the phenomenon of Islamist hip-hop. Aidi also mentions that the United States and other Western governments have attempted to use hip-hop and Sufi music to fight terrorism by deradicalizing young Muslims.

== See also ==
- Taqwacore
- Christian hip hop
- Hindutva pop
