= The Dope Poet Society =

Canadian musical group

- Origin: Toronto, Ontario, Canada
- Genre: Hip hop
- Years active: 1995–present
- Label: Justus League Records
- Members: Professor D aka ProfessorD.us, DJ Spinister, Ghost MC, DJ Kevindicator

The Dope Poet Society is a hip hop group from Toronto, Ontario, Canada. Their music is characterized by clever and sometimes controversial lyrics. ProfessorD.us (formerly Professor D) is the lead vocalist of the group. The group has been active since 1995 and has toured around the world. They have also performed and collaborated with artists including Public Enemy, Dead Prez, Jeru the Damaja, and Boot Camp Click.

Professor D changed his name to ProfessorD.us with the release of his 2008 album, Third World Warriors Vol.1, which lists the artist as "ProfessorD.us - The Dope Poet Society".

== History ==
The Dope Poet Society, in their early teens, recorded a song and music video for YTV, entitled Canadian Unity (1992). The group founded Justus League Records and released their first vinyl single and music video, "Too Many Years" (1995), which appeared on Rapcity and was featured on MuchMusic's Indie Spotlight. Their debut album, Dangerous Days was released in 1997. It was credited by Now as "fostering a… sense of community" in Toronto's hip hop scene. Their second album, Hipolitics (1999), spawned their first major hit, "Fuck Mike Harris!" In their review of the EP, Now wrote, "If Dalton McGuinty or Howard Hampton [Ontario provincial opposition leaders of the time] wanted to really make their point with the youth, they'd adopt the lead cut on this five-song EP as their campaign theme song." The song became a huge hit on college radio across the province and across the country. Public Enemy frontman, Chuck D, began playing the song on his internet radio show on bringthenoise.com and began a relationship with the group which led to mentorship and collaboration.

The Dope Poet Society is known for quickly responding to political events with critical material. In 2000, they released a song "dissing" George W. Bush, and condemning him as a "terrorist". Two weeks after September 11, 2001, the group released their CD 9/11 World Trade. In the title track they allude to Malcolm X's likening John F. Kennedy's assassination to "chickens coming home to roost", implying that September 11 was another case of "the chickens coming home to roost". In 2003, in response to the US's invasion of Iraq, The Dope Poet Society released the single "War of Terrorism". The song was debuted at Toronto's Metro Hall to a crowd of 80,000 anti-war protestors on February 15, 2003. Jeff Chang wrote in the UK's New Internationalist, "The Dope Poet Society's song 'War of Terrorism', challenged the moral righteousness of the war and echoed many anti-war activists' concerns that far more insidious motives were driving it." In an article commissioned by The Centre for Political Song at Glasgow University, Janis McNair notes that "The Dope Poet Society's track War of Terrorism, expressed a fundamental conjecture of anti-war protestors: the root of the conflict is oil." The title of the group's third CD, ProIntelPro: Promote Intelligence Program is a play on the FBI's COINTELPRO operations, as the group's self-proclaimed aim is to "promote intelligence rather than counter it".

The Dope Poet Society was the first Canadian Urban act to perform at MIDEM, the world's largest music conference. They were introduced by Chuck D and joined on stage by Canadian rap godfather Maestro and up-and-comer Rochester.

== Activism ==
The Dope Poet Society has been politically active from its inception. They have performed at protests and political events across North America. In 1993, they performed their anti-sexist song "Lady Killer" at North York City Hall for that year's commemoration of the École Polytechnique massacre. In 1994, they performed and aggressively participated in rallies organized by Anti-Racist Action Network (ARA) and other local groups with the express purpose of physically confronting neo-Nazis that had been organizing and harassing people of colour in Toronto's East end. In the late 1990s the group was active in a culture jamming group known as the Toronto Media Collective, profiled in Naomi Klein's book No Logo. In 2000, members of the group founded the Toronto Hip-Hop Cultural Arts Centre (THC) and were actively involved in the centre's programs. The THC hosted community events involving all the elements of HipHop and offered computer access, homework assistance, general advice and job counseling to local youth. The organization faced racially motivated attacks and police harassment. The centre closed in 2005.

== Third World Warriors Vol. 1 ==
The 2008 album from ProfessorD.us – The Dope Poet Society, is entitled Third World Warriors Vol. 1. The record focuses on world politics dropped with "constantly morphing… tongue twisting flows" and an army of guest contributors including award-winning musicians, rappers, singers and producers. The album's first single and video is called "Freedom in Haiti". In the song, ProfessorD.us raps about Haiti's under-heralded place in history as the site of the world's greatest slave revolution and of that nation's continued oppression by the US, France and Canada, under the guise of foreign aid. The music video is directed by US journalist and filmmaker Kevin Pina and features original footage shot by Pina in Haiti. The B-side, "Everything's Political", features M-1 of dead prez. The song is ProfessorD.us and M-1's sharp response to all those who ask, "Why is your music always so political?" dead prez, like the Dope Poet Society, cite Public Enemy as a major influence, and the groups consolidated their revolutionary camaraderie while sharing various stages around the world.

== Discography ==
=== Albums ===
- 1997 Dangerous Days
- 1999 Hipolitics
- 2001 9/11 World Trade
- 2005 ProIntelPro: Promote Intelligence Program
- 2008 Third World Warriors Vol. 1

=== Singles ===
- 1995 "Too Many Years"
- 1999 "Fuck Mike Harris"
- 2000 "Bushit (George Bush is a Terrorist)"
- 2003 "War of Terrorism"
- 2005 "All of Us" Featuring various artists
- 2005 "Hurricane Katrina" Featuring Ian Smith
- 2008 "Freedom in Haiti" Featuring Obie
