= Gabriele Faerno =

Humanist scholar

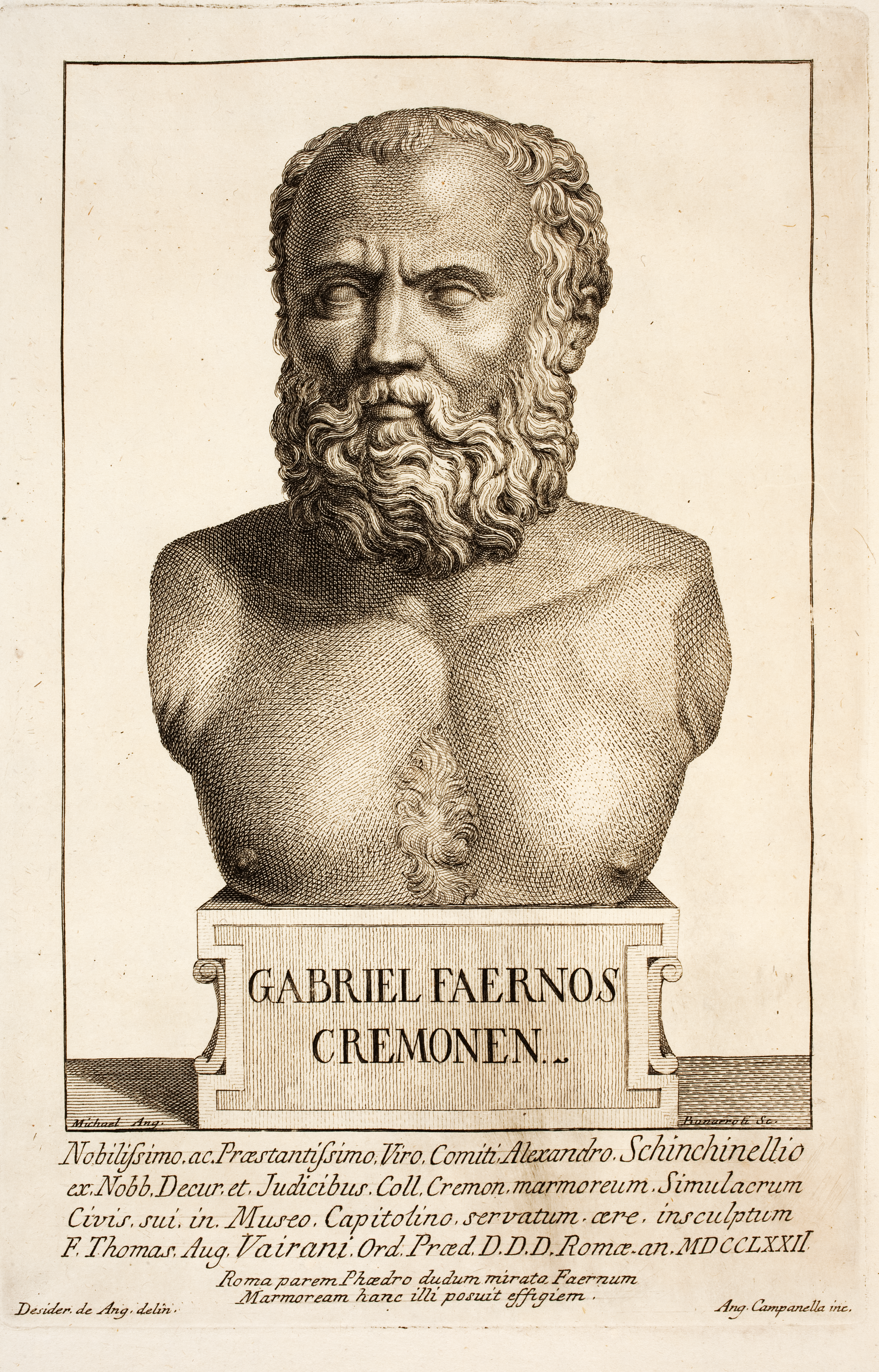
A print by Thomas Augustinus Vairani of Gabriele Faerno's bust in the Capitoline Museum, 1772

The humanist scholar Gabriele Faerno, also known by his Latin name of Faernus Cremonensis, was born in Cremona about 1510 and died in Rome on 17 November 1561. He was a scrupulous textual editor and an elegant Latin poet who is best known now for his collection of Aesop's Fables in Latin verse.

== Life ==
Gabriele Faerno was born in Cremona to Francis Faerno, a local lawyer and scholar. In 1528 he was enrolled at the Collegium Notariorum in his hometown and then entered the service of the Bishop of Cremona. Biographical details for this period are sparse, except that in 1538 he is recorded as following his master on a mission to Barcelona in Spain. At some time in the next decade he was recommended by his sponsors to Rome. The first evidence of his presence in the city is in a letter from Carlo Gualteruzzi to Giovanni Della Casa in October, 1548. At the start of 1549 he began working in the Vatican Library and was brought into contact with many of the scholars and philologists who gravitated around the activities there.

Faerno's literary accomplishments over the next decade gained him the esteem and friendship of the cardinal Giovanni Angelo de Medici, afterwards Pope Pius IV, and of his nephew the cardinal Charles Borromeo. Having acquired a critical knowledge of the Latin language, he was enabled to display much judgment in the correction of the Roman classics, and in the collation of ancient manuscripts on which he was frequently employed. Once Pius IV was elected to the papal throne, Faerno was urged to publish some of the results of his diligent work. He was also offered a bishopric, which he modestly refused. Illness intervened before he could see the works he was preparing through the press and he died at the home of Cardinal Giovanni Morone towards the end of 1561.

A rare bust of Faerno by Michelangelo is in the Philosophers Room of the Capitoline Museum.

== Scholarship ==
Faerno died in the prime of life. His works are as follows:

- 1. Terentii Comoediae, Florence 1565, 2 vols. 8vo, a valuable and rare edition, completed after his death by his friend Piero Vettori. There is no ancient editor to whom Terence is more indebted than to Faerno; who, by a judicious collation of ancient manuscripts and editions, has restored the true reading of his author in many important passages. Faerno's edition became the basis of almost every subsequent one, and Dr. Richard Bentley had such an opinion of his notes that he reprinted them entire in his edition.
- 2. Ciceronis Orationes Philippicae, Rome 1563, 8vo, very highly praised by Graevius.
- 3. He also worked on the conflicting manuscripts of the historian Livy and Faerno's contemporary, Latino Latini, has left a note on the scrupulous care with which he approached the subject. 'As for Livy, I would not want you to believe that [Faerno] is so bold and presumptuous as to add or change anything without the evidence of the ancient codices, unless obviously corrupt. If he cannot avoid mistakes at times, he does everything scrupulously, giving exact reasons for any opinion or conjecture of his, so as to leave anyone free to judge for himself.'

Other Latin authors to whom Faerno dedicated his efforts include Ennius, Horace, Plautus, Suetonius, and Tacitus.

== Poetry ==
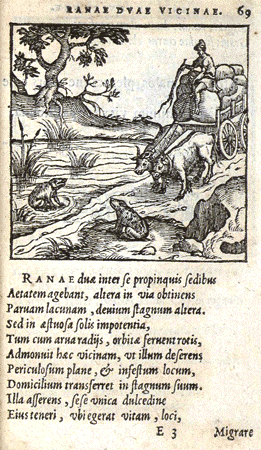
A page from the Plantin edition of Faerno's 100 Fables, Antwerp 1567

Faerno is counted one of the foremost of the Renaissance Latin poets, largely on account of his "100 Fables" (Centum Fabulae ex antiquis autoribus delectae, et carminibus explicatae). Though not published until 1563, there is evidence that the work was completed as early as 1558. So excellent were his versions that one scholar went so far as to accuse him of concealing an undiscovered manuscript of Phaedrus for fear of lessening the value of his own versions. But Charles Perrault, who published a translation of Faerno's work into French verse (Paris 1699), defended the author from this imputation in his preface.

Pope Pius IV, convinced that reading the fables of Aesop was of great use in forming the morals of young children, commissioned Gabriel Faerno, whom he knew as an excellent poet as well as a man with a taste for elegant and beautiful Latinity, to versify these fables so that children might learn, at the same time and from the same book, both moral and linguistic purity....Faerno has been called a second Phaedrus, by reason of the excellent style of his Fables, though he never saw Phaedrus, who did not come to our knowledge till above thirty years after his death; for Pithoeus, having found that manuscript in the dust of an old library, published it in the beginning of this century. Thuanus, who makes very honourable mention of our author in his history, pretends that Phaedrus was not unknown to him; and even blames him for having suppressed that author, to conceal what he had stolen from him. But there is no ground for what he says; and it is only the effect of the strong persuasion of all those who are so great admirers of antiquity as to think that a modern author can do nothing that is excellent, unless he has an ancient author for his model. Out of the hundred fables which Faerno published in Latin verse, there are but five that had been treated by Phaedrus, and out of those five there are but one or two that have been managed nearly in the same manner: which happened only because it is impossible that two men, who treat on the same subject, should not agree sometimes in the same thoughts, or in the same expressions."

Besides fables collected 'from ancient authors', Mediaeval folk tales such as The miller, his son and the donkey and The Mice in Council were included in the work as well. It was to go through some forty European editions, including translations into Italian, English, German, Dutch and French. In England the 1741 edition, which included Perrault's French translations and an English translation, was to serve as a school textbook. But the work was successful and influential for other reasons than the fineness of the language. The illustrations by Pirro Ligorio which accompanied each fable were also esteemed. Published at the time of a taste for Emblem books, the morals with which Faerno furnished the fables by way of conclusion were seen as contributing to that fashion and widening the subject matter to include the Aesopic fable too.

Poems attributed to Faerno were also printed in some later editions. They include his attack on Protestantism as a 'Germanic sect', In Lutheranos, sectam Germanicam; verses accompanying illustrations of artistic works; complimentary addresses and other occasional verse. He was also the author of sonnets in Italian.

== Titles ==
The title of Faerno's celebrated work translates as 'One hundred delightful fables, poetically interpreted from ancient authors'. The following is a list of the fables occurring there, with links to those that have a separate article devoted to them.

1. Ollae duae - The Two Pots
2. Iupiter et Minerva.
3. Leo, asinus et vulpes - The Lion's Share
4. asinus et lupus.
5. leo mente captus et caprea.
6. asini duo.
7. Formica et cicada - The Ant and the Grasshopper
8. turdi.
9. sus et canis.
10. Senex et mors - The Old Man and Death
11. mergus, rubus et vespertilio.
12. cornix et canis.
13. Corvus et mater - The Sick Kite
14. Musca - The Fly in the Soup
15. rusticus et eques.
16. Equus et asinus - The Horse and the Donkey
17. Vulpes et erinaceus - The Fox, the Flies and the Hedgehog
18. Leo et vulpes - The Lion and the Fox
19. Vulpes et uva - The Fox and the Grapes
20. Corvus et vulpes - The Fox and the Crow (Aesop)
21. dies festus et profestus.
22. pavo et monedula.
23. cervus et hinnulus.
24. Cervus et serpens - The Crow and the Snake
25. Cygnus et anser - The Swan and the Goose
26. puer et scorpius.
27. Anguilla et serpens - The Eel and the Snake
28. canis et lupus.
29. Canis, gallus et vulpes - The Cock, the Dog and the Fox
30. mulus.
31. iuvenes duo et coquus.
32. cochleae.
33. cornix et hirundo.
34. Mercurius et statuarius - The Statue of Hermes
35. Pater et filii - The Farmer and his Sons
36. Simius et delphus - The Ape and the Dolphin
37. ranae duae sitientes.
38. ranae duae vicinae.
39. Auceps et cassita - The Bird-catcher and the Blackbird
40. deceptor et Apollo.
41. Uxor submersa et vir - The drowned woman and her husband
42. Feles et gallus - noticed under The Wolf and the Lamb
43. asinus simius et talpa.
44. vulpes vota mutans.
45. Musca et quadrigae - The fly on the chariot wheel
46. pica et aves.
47. Mures - The Mice in Council
48. Avarus - The Miser and his Gold
49. vulpes et lupus.
50. Canna et oliva - The Oak and the Reed
51. asini et Iupiter.
52. herus et canis.
53. Canis et caro - The Dog and Its Reflection
54. asinus et aper.
55. pullus asini et lupus.
56. Lupus et grus - The Wolf and the Crane
57. Iupiter et cochlea - mentioned under Zeus and the Tortoise
58. Satyrus et homo - The Satyr and the Traveller
59. Mures et feles - The Cat and the Mice
60. Vulpes et aquila - The Eagle and the Fox
61. vulpes.
62. Lignator et Mercurius - The Honest Woodcutter
63. Fullo et carbonarius - The Fuller and the Charcoal Burner
64. iactator.
65. vulpes et rubus.
66. Vulpes et larva - The Fox and the Mask
67. canes duo.
68. Mulier et medicus - The Old Woman and the Doctor
69. Asinus dominos mutans - The Ass and his Masters
70. cerva et vitis - The Stag and the Vine
71. latro et mater.
72. vates.
73. Astrologus - The Astrologer who Fell into a Well
74. Leo et vulpes - The Fox and the Sick Lion
75. armentarius.
76. lupus et mulier.
77. vespertilio et mustela.
78. aper et vulpes.
79. gallinus et hirundo.
80. canes duo et coquus.
81. Simius et vulpes - noticed under The Boy and the Filberts
82. Vulpes, asinus et leo
83. Formica - noticed under The Ant and the Grasshopper
84. asinus et equus.
85. monedula.
86. herus et canes.
87. agnus et lupus
88. Asinus et vulpes - The Ass in the Lion's Skin
89. asinus corvus et lupus.
90. Mercurius.
91. Bubulcus et Hercules - Hercules and the Wagoner
92. Momus
93. Arbores et rhamnus - noticed under The Trees and the Bramble
94. Spes - The Jar of Blessings
95. Asinus simulacrum gestans - The Ass Carrying an Image
96. cassita.
97. vulpes et simius.
98. rusticus et Iuppiter.
99. leo lupus et vulpes.
100. Pater, filius et asinus - The miller, his son and the donkey

== Notes ==
The bulk of the biographical information is taken from the Dizionario Biografico degli Italiani (Dictionary of Italian Biography) It has been supplemented with details from Alexander Chalmers’ General Biographical Dictionary (1812–17), a text that is in the public domain on account of its age.
