= The Eel and the Snake =

Fable

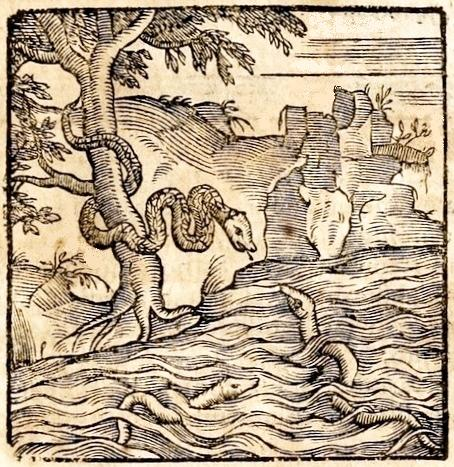
An illustration of the fable in Gabriele Faerno's collection of Aesop's Fables, 1590

The fable of the Eel and the Snake was originated by Laurentius Abstemius in his Hecatomythium (1490). Versions of it appeared in several European languages afterwards and in collections associated with Aesop's Fables.

== The fable and its versions ==
The fable consists of a conversation between an eel and a snake. The eel observes that they are both alike and wonders why humans pursue itself with such energy while they avoid contact with the snake. The latter replies that this is because no one who tries to wound him goes away unharmed and from this the conclusion is drawn that those who avenge themselves are less likely to be injured.

The fable was written in Latin prose and was later retold in Latin verse in Gabriele Faerno's Centum Fabulae (1563) and shortly after in Italian verse in Giovanni Maria Verdizotti's Cento Favole Morali (Venice 1570), both of which were largely reliant on Aesopian sources. Early English prose versions appeared in Philip Ayres' Mythologia ethica, or Three centuries of Æsopian fables (1688), and attributed to Abstemius in both Roger L'Estrange's Fables (1692) and in the United States in An Argosy of Fables (New York 1921).

The story was also popular elsewhere in Europe and was retold in various versions in German by Johann Wilhelm Ludwig Gleim and Friedrich Schiller. In French there were versions, none of which deviated far from the original fable, among others by N.Ganeau in the 18th century, and in the 19th century by Louis-François Jauffret, Jean François Guichard, M. F. Devenet, and the Belgian Baron Goswin de Stassart.
