= The Fuller and the Charcoal Burner =

Fable by Aesop

The fuller (or cloth cleaner) and the charcoal burner (or collier) is one of Aesop's Fables and numbered 29 in the Perry Index.

== The fable ==
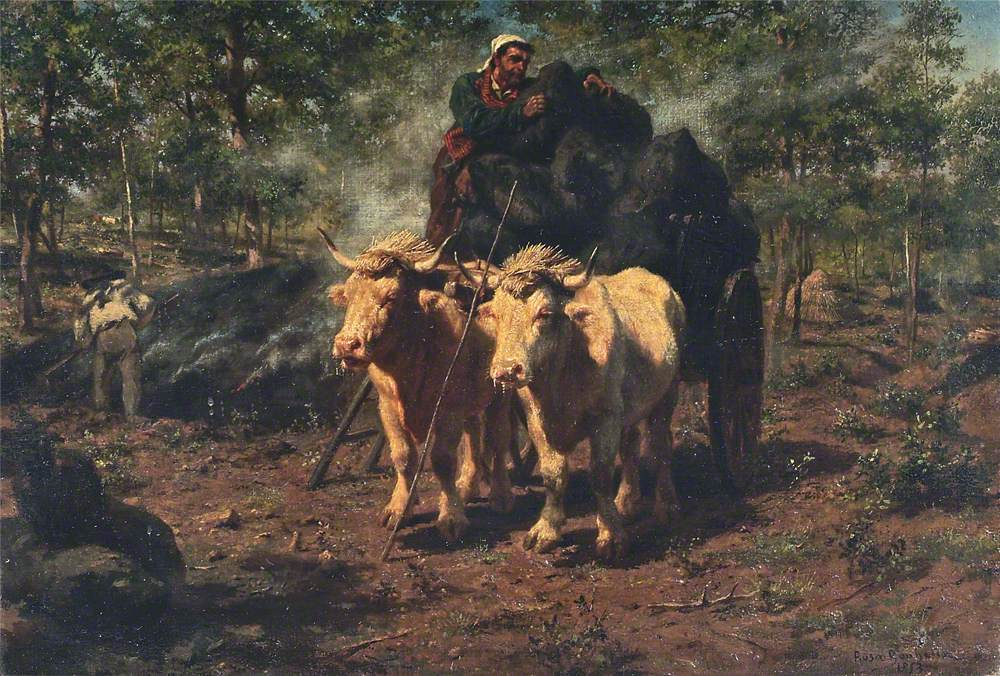
Rosa Bonheur's 1853 painting of the charcoal burner returning home from work

A charcoal burner proposed to his friend the fuller that they share quarters in the same house, but the fuller replied, "That would be impossible, for whatever I whitened, you would immediately blacken again". The story is from an ancient Greek situational fable involving human characters which teaches that opposites are incompatible. Cicero later seems to draw a political moral from the fable in one of his letters, in which he discusses the irreconcilability between republicans and supporters of Julius Caesar. And in the Victorian era, the preacher Charles Haddon Spurgeon applied what he called "the well-worn fable" to religious difference.

In Renaissance times there were 16th century poetic versions of the fable in Neo-Latin by Gabriele Faerno and by Hieronymus Osius. The latter concludes with the sentiment that

Difference is far from such accord
That only likeness will afford.

An English version of the story appeared in the 1692 fable collection of Roger L'Estrange with the very broad application that "Tis a necessary Rule in Alliances, Matches, Societies, Fraternities, Friendships, Partnerships, Commerce, and all manner of civil dealings and Contracts, to have a strict Regard to Humour, the Nature, and the Disposition of those we have to do withal." Samuel Croxall also featured it in 1722 under the title of "The Collier and the Fuller" and Thomas Bewick with the same title in 1784.
