= The Stag and the Vine =

Aesop's fable

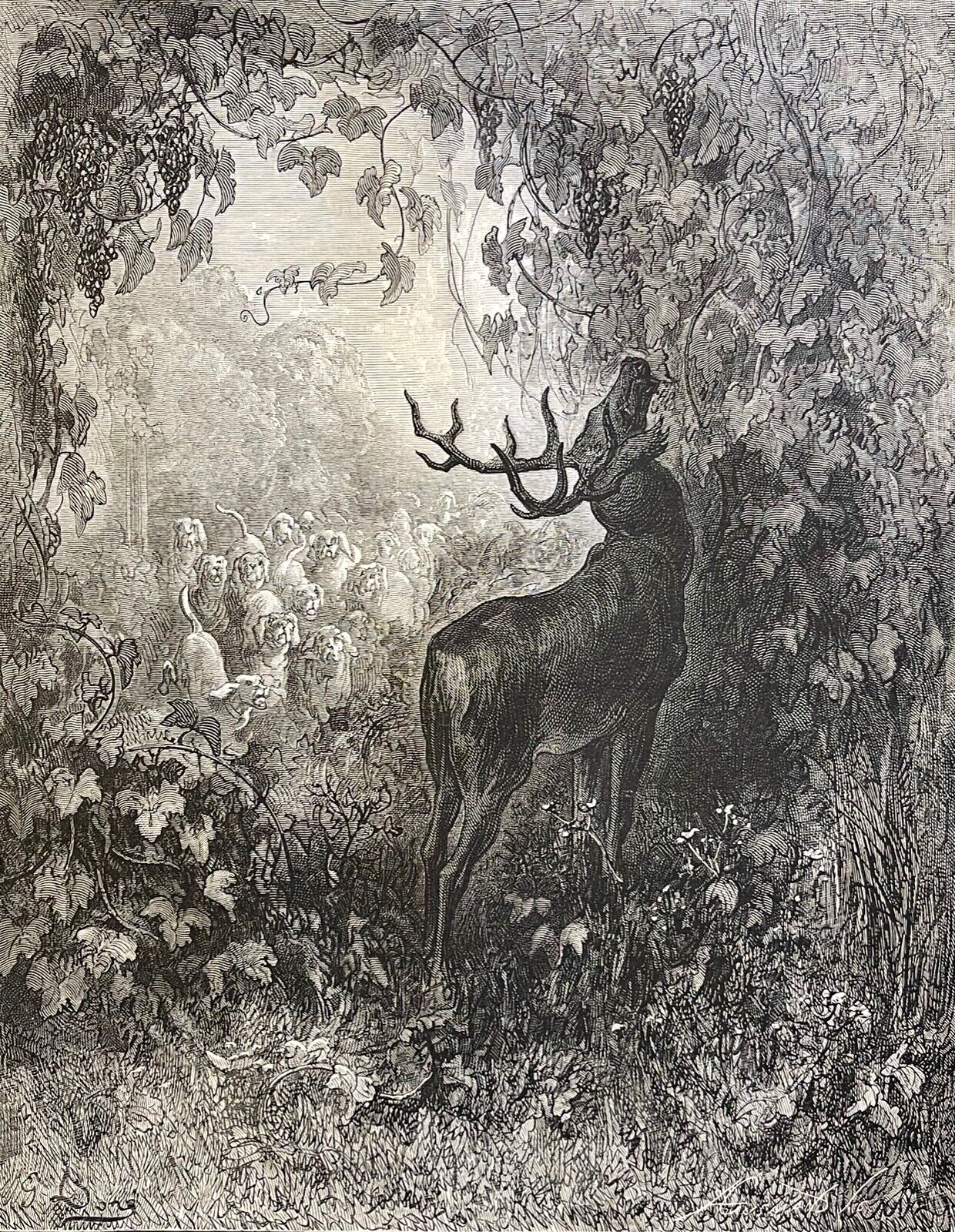
Gustave Doré pictures the stag nibbling the vine as the hunting hounds close in, 1867

The stag (hart, hind or deer) and the vine is a formerly popular and widely translated fable by Aesop. It is numbered 77 in the Perry Index.

== The fable and its history ==
A deer pursued by hunters hides among the vines. While there, it nibbles the leaves of the plant and so betrays its presence to the hunters, who return and kill it. The dying deer acknowledges the righteousness of the divine punishment for ingratitude to its benefactor. The fable has remained more or less unchanged in form since its first appearance in Greek sources.

From the 16th century the fable was frequently retold in Europe. Gabriele Faerno included a Latin poetic version titled Cerva et vitis in his Centum Fabulae (1563), a work that soon became a widely distributed school textbook with a French verse translation. In that century too the fable was taken to Mexico by Spanish colonialists, who translated it into the Aztec language and had to coin the word for 'vineyard' specially from Nahuatl, since plantations had only recently been introduced by the European invaders. Later in the Far East, Portuguese priests related the story in their Japanese compilation of Aesop's Fables, Esopo no Fabulas (1593).

In 1666 La Fontaine included the story in the first volume of his fables under the title Le cerf et la vigne, and the story was translated back into Latin verse by J.B. Giraud in his schoolbook of 1775. Then in the following century, another Latin poetic version of the original fable was published in a schoolbook "intended as a help towards original composition".

One of the earliest English prose versions of the story was titled "The Hind and the Vine" and included in Charles Hoole's Aesop's Fables English and Latin (1700). Shortly afterwards it was retold in verse at the end of an essay on ingratitude by Arthur Maynwaring. 18th century compilers of fables retitled the story "The Hart and the Vine" and accompanied it with lengthy moral commentaries. By the 19th century that title had become "The Stag and the Vine" in a short poem by Brooke Boothby and in Elizur Wright's US translation of La Fontaine's fables.

Much earlier, Roger L'Estrange had included the fable in his collection of 1692, accompanied by a political reflexion that alluded to the civil conflicts between monarch and parliament in which he had participated earlier in the century. However, the title of "The Goat and the Vine" that he gave it properly belongs to a completely different fable by Aesop in which retribution is threatened but is slower to follow.
