= The drowned woman and her husband =

16th Century fable

The drowned woman and her husband is a story found in Mediaeval jest-books that entered the fable tradition in the 16th century. It was occasionally included in collections of Aesop's Fables but never became established as such and has no number in the Perry Index. Folk variants in which a contrary wife is sought upstream by her husband after she drowns are catalogued under the Aarne-Thompson classification system as type 1365A.

== The story ==
One of the earliest appearances of the story is in the 12th century, when it was included in Marie de France's rhymed fables, the Ysopet, under the title "The man who had a contrary wife" (tale 96). Its most concise telling is in Poggio Bracciolini's Facetiae (1450), where it is titled "The man who searched in the river for his dead wife":

A man, whose wife had drowned in a stream, went up the river against the current to look for the body. A peasant who saw him marvelled greatly at this, and advised him to follow the flow of the current. "In that case", returned the first, "I should never find her, for when she was alive she was always difficult and contrary and went against the ways of others, so I am sure now that she is dead, she will go against the current of the stream."

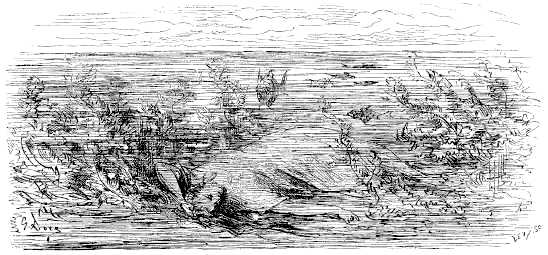
Gustave Doré's print of La Fontaine's fable, 1880

The language that Poggio uses is Latin, but there is an English retelling in the early Tudor Merry Tales and Quick Answers (c.1530) and another in Geoffrey Whitney's Choice of Emblemes (1586). In Italy there had been the elegant Latin verses of Gabriele Faerno's influential Centum Fabulae (1554) and the Italian rhyming version by Giovanni Maria Verdizotti (1570). But the most influential telling of all was in La Fontaine's Fables as "The drowned wife" (La femme noyée, III.16). In this he deprecates the anti-feminist trend of the story but uses it as an illustration of how a governing nature persists throughout life 'and even beyond, perhaps'.

La Fontaine begins his account by protesting that he is not among those who use the contemporary French idiom, 'it's nothing, just a woman drowning', referring to those who lazily subscribed to such societal attitudes. At the end he echoes Faerno's conclusion that a person's nature does not change. Poggio's jest book and the English 'Merry Tales', on the other hand, avoid drawing a moral and end on the popular idiom of 'swimming against the current', used of just such characters as the contrary wife is said to be.

Folk variants with similar pay-off lines were recorded from several European countries in the 19th century. Asian variants include a Pakistani version and another told of the Turkish Nasreddin Hodja. In the 20th century a Ukrainian variant was recorded.

== Artistic uses ==
Pictures of the fable in books for some centuries usually depicted a group of men pointing opposite ways by the stream-side, following the emblematic lead of the German illustrator of Fearno's Centum Fabulae (1590) and of François Chauveau, the original illustrator of La Fontaine's Fables. It was only much later that attention switched to a compassionate view of the drowned woman, as in Gustave Doré's illustration of the fable (above) and Marc Chagall's 1952 etching. These follow in the wake of sympathetic treatments of the subject like the "Ophelia" (1852) of John Everett Millais and "A Christian martyr drowned in the Tiber during the reign of Diocletian" (1855) by Eugène Delacroix.

The fable was set for solo voice as the sixth piece in Six Fables de La Fontaine (1861) by Pauline Thys. In 1954 Florent Schmitt included it in his Fables sans morales for mixed choir or four soloists (Op. 130). It was also among the four pieces in Isabelle Aboulker's Femmes en fables (1999).
