= The Beaver (fable) =

Fable by Aesop

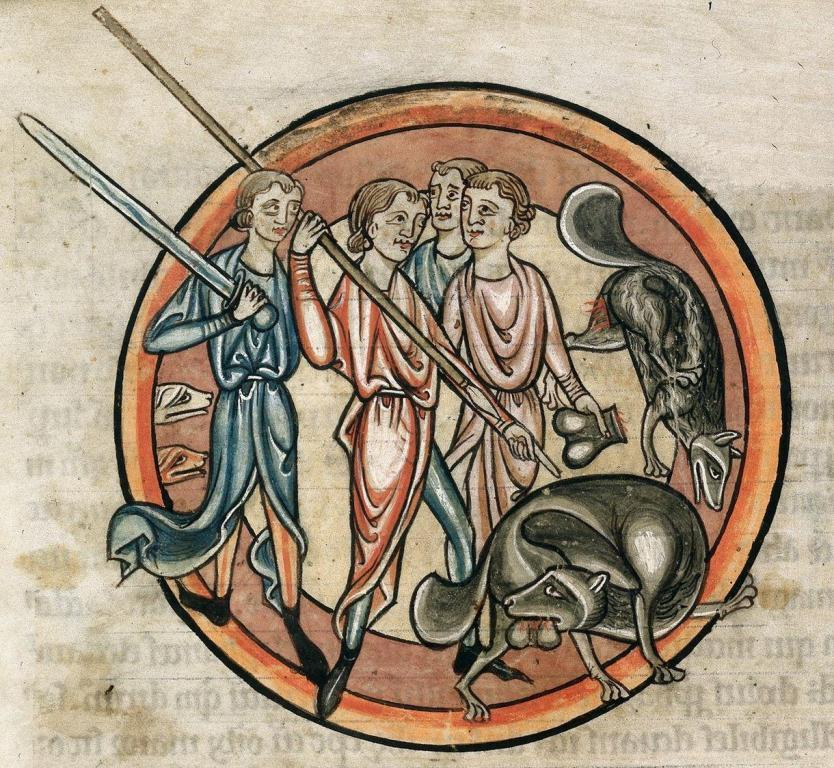
A 13th-century manuscript illustrating a hunted beaver castrating itself

The beaver fable, or the story of the hunted beaver, tells of how, when hunted, the beaver will chew off his own testicles, or tail, and leave them behind to distract his pursuers. It is based on the idea that, in ancient times, the beaver was hunted for its testicles, which it was thought had medicinal qualities. The story that the animal would gnaw these off to save itself when hunted was preserved by some ancient Greek naturalists and perpetuated into the Middle Ages. It also appeared as a Greek fable ascribed to Aesop and is numbered 118 in the Perry Index.

In Latin literary sources, the fable was versified by 1st-century CE Roman fabulist Phaedrus and is alluded to a little later by the Roman poet Juvenal in a satire. There the merchant Catullus jettisons his rich cargo from a ship caught in a storm 'in imitation of the beaver that in its desire to escape death, will bite off its testicles and render itself a eunuch'. The moral that Juvenal and later fabulists drew from the story is that in order to preserve oneself it is better to sacrifice lesser considerations.

== Interpretations ==
The beaver's example was eventually to be recommended to good Christians. In Classical times the priests of Cybele castrated themselves in order to devote themselves wholly to their goddess. A saying by Jesus that 'there are eunuchs which have made themselves eunuchs for the kingdom of heaven's sake' (Matthew 19.12) was taken by some in the early Church as seeming to recommend a similar practice, rather than abstinence, and the early Church Fathers had constantly to argue that this had to be taken metaphorically. It was in this context that Tertullian scorned the celibate followers of Marcion with a reference to the fable, asking "Is any beaver more self castrating?"

Once the metaphorical nature of the saying of Jesus was established, the fable was looked on more favorably as a reference to Christian renunciation. So the 12th century Aberdeen Bestiary comments on the beaver's behaviour that in a similar way "every man who heeds God's commandment and wishes to live chastely should cut off all his vices and shameless acts, and cast them from him". It is further mentioned in this bestiary that if a beaver, already castrated, encounters another hunter, he stands on two legs to show that he no longer has what the hunter seeks and so is spared. A scene depicting this is incorporated into at least one example of Church architecture. The passage has also been set by the composer R. Murray Schafer in his A Medieval Bestiary (1996).

The fable was later reinterpreted by Andrea Alciato as part of the emblem tradition as the type of self-preservation. The Latin poem beneath the illustration in his Emblemata (1531) counsels, "By the example of this animal, learn not to spare your possessions but to give money to your enemies, in order to preserve your life". In England the fable appeared in Roger L'Estrange's collection with the same interpretation and later in that of Samuel Croxall with the added political reflection that a politician pursued for peculation should buy himself off by sharing his gains with his prosecutors.

Thomas Browne, writing of this supposed behaviour of the beaver in his Pseudodoxia Epidemica (1646), cites not only Aesop and Aristotle but Pliny and Solinus. Other ancient authorities disagree, he adds: Sestius (a physician mentioned by Pliny) "and Dioscorides, who plainly affirms that this tradition is false". Additionally, Browne notes that more modern authors who wrote of American beavers, such as Aldrovandus, Mathiolus and Bellonius, do not mention beavers castrating themselves. Ultimately, he concludes that the fable originates from Egyptian hieroglyphs which "became Mythologicall unto the Greeks, and so set down by Aesop". The fable reflects a moral value, however, and "the sagacity and wisdome of that animal; which indeed from the works it performs, and especially its artifice in building, is very strange, and surely not to be matched by any other".
