= The Farmer and his Sons =

Aesop's fable

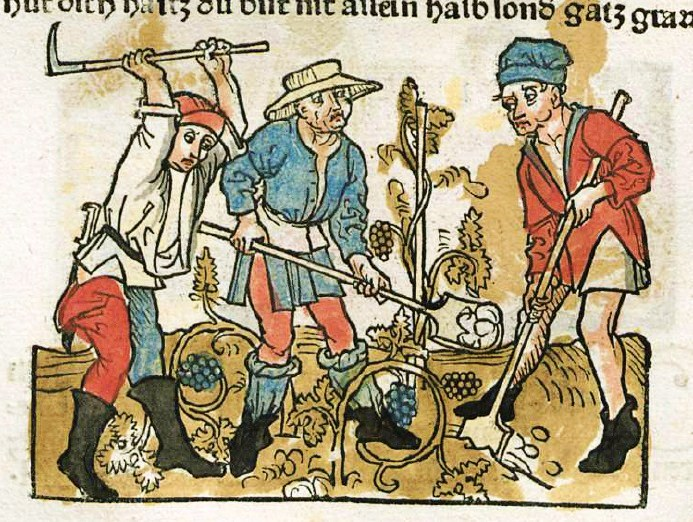
A coloured print of the fable from the 1501 Steinhowel edition

The Farmer and his Sons is a story of Greek origin that is included among Aesop's Fables and is listed as 42 in the Perry Index. It illustrates both the value of hard work and the need to temper parental advice with practicality.

== The Fable ==
A farmer nearing death calls his sons to him in secret and tells them not to divide the family land since there is a treasure hidden somewhere on it. But afterwards, although they dig it over carefully, they find nothing. However, when the crops (or in some versions the vines) flourish profitably, they realise that the valuable hidden meaning of his advice refers to hard work.

The fable is rare in dealing directly with the human situation, rather than through the intermediary of animals. Although it has long been accepted as one of Aesop's, and appeared as his in early European collections, the story has also been ascribed to the philosopher Socrates. The Neo-Latin poets Gabriele Faerno and Hieronymus Osius both wrote poetic versions, as did Jean de la Fontaine in French.

There is no consistency of titling. Greek sources make the father a farmer (Γεωργὸς), while Osius calls him a peasant (rusticus). Caxton's description is labourer, as is La Fontaine's, although the French laboureur has the meaning of an independent husbandman, the term used by Samuel Croxall. The nature of the ground cultivated differs as well. The 15th century illustrations in the Medici Manuscript and in Heinrich Steinhowel's collection make it a vineyard, as it is also described in the poems by Faerno and Osius, but other versions are not always so specific.

The moral of the story appears pithily in La Fontaine's version as le travail est un trésor (work is wealth), as is also made explicit in the Greek (ὁ κάματος θησαυρός ἐστι) and in Faerno's Latin (thesaurus est labor). English versions have been more roundabout and long-winded. Caxton prefaces the story with the opinion that "He that laboureth and werketh contynuelly maye not faylle to haue plente of goodes". Croxall prefaces his long application with, "Labour and Industry, well applied, seldom fail of finding a Treasure", while Thomas Bewick's edition contains the verse "Assiduous pains the swelling coffers fill". However, Bewick's main comment is on the value of the father's advice and the craft by which he conveyed it. This also is what attracts the attention of Roger L'Estrange: "Good Counsel is the best Legacy a Father can leave to a Child".

== Treatment in the arts ==
The 15th century manuscript illustration already mentioned combines the sons gathered about their dying father's bed with a view of their toiling in the vineyard. Most subsequent textual treatments of the fable chose either one or the other theme, until the composite treatment in Benjamin Rabier's poster of 1906. However, magic-realist painter Lukáš Kándl prefers to point towards the fable's moral in depicting plants breaking out of the ground, each sheathing a gold-coloured pearl.

Several composers have set La Fontaine's version of the fable, Le laboureur et ses enfants. They include the four-part song by the Belgian harpist Felix Godefroid (1818–1897) and other French examples by Théodore Schloesser (1866), Paul Blanquière (1892) and E. Levasseur (1906). Two more, a setting for three children's voices by Henri Maréchal (Paris, 1900) and for four male voices by Jules Pajot, (Lyon, 1910), precede the more ambitious Eh bien ! Dansez maintenant (2006) by Vladimir Cosma, in which the fable is the final piece in a light-hearted interpretation for narrator and orchestra, in this case in the style of a pavane. The fable is also included in Isabelle Aboulker's Les Fables Enchantées (2004).

There have also been French dramatic treatments, including the three-act comédie rustique of 1935 by H. Frederic Pottecher (1905–2001) and the 1936 one-act version by painter-playwright Henri Brochet (1898–1952).
