= The Swan and the Goose =

Aesop's fable

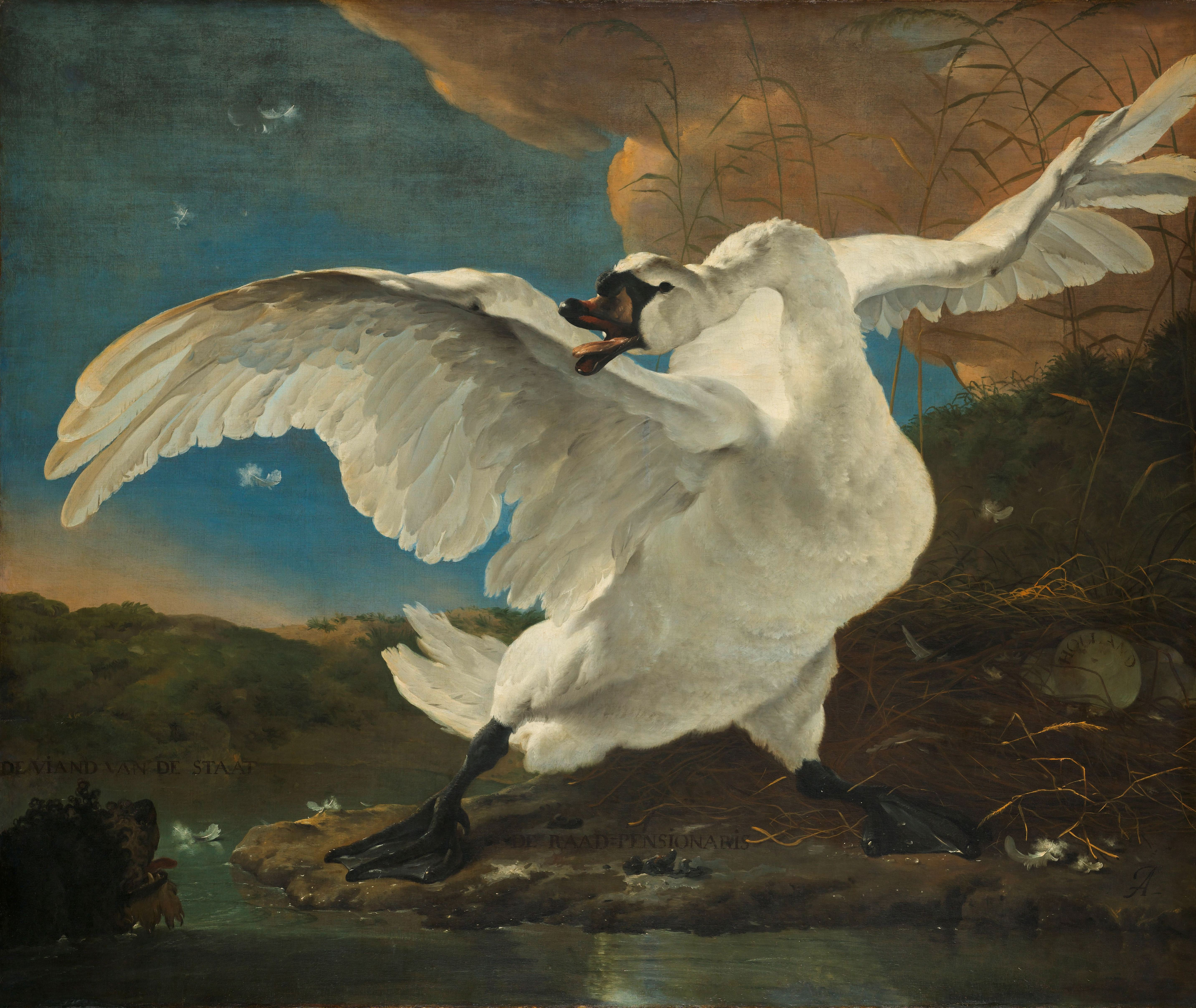
The Threatened Swan by Jan Asselijn,1650

The classical legend that the swan sings at death was incorporated into one of Aesop's Fables, numbered 399 in the Perry Index. The fable also introduces the proverbial antithesis between the swan and the goose that gave rise to such sayings as 'Every man thinks his own geese are swans', in reference to blind partiality, and 'All his swans are turned to geese', referring to a reverse of fortune.

== The fable and its variations ==
The fable recorded by Aphthonius of Antioch concerns a swan that its owner mistook for a goose in the dark and was about to kill it until the swan's song alerted him to the mistake he was making. At the start is the claim that this will encourage young people to study, and it ends with the dubious statement "that music is so powerful that it can even avert death".

When Gabriele Faerno versified the fable as Cygnus et Anser (the swan and the goose) in his Fabulae C Aesopicae (1543), he underlined the usefulness of eloquence in his summing up and Giovanni Maria Verdizotti followed him in his Italian version, il cigno et l'occa. The latter also provides the moral that fair speech is sometimes of great profit (un bel parlar à tempo è gran guadagno) while the similar story in La Fontaine's Fables, which he titles the Swan and the Cook (Le cygne et le cuisinier, III.12), comes to rest on the sentiment that gentle speech does no harm (le doux parler ne nuit de rien). English versions of the fable were recorded by Roger L'Estrange (1698) and George Fyler Townsend (1867) and the latter's text was set as the final piece in Bob Chilcott's Aesop's Fables (2008).

Another fable based on the same folklore appears in the Perry Index as number 233 but was much less recorded. In this a man buys a swan and invites guests to dinner so as to hear it sing. When it does not, he orders the bird to be served up at the meal, whereupon its bursts into song and the man blames himself for not having commanded that at the start.

Laurentius Abstemius created another in his Hecatomythium in which the swan is asked by a stork (rather than a goose) why it greets death so ecstatically when most beings fear to die. It replies that it welcomes death as a release from all life's miseries. Others, however, interpreted the song as a farewell to the joys of life, as in the madrigal "The Silver Swan" by Orlando Gibbons, which also brings in the contrast between swan and goose:

"Farewell, all joys! O Death, come close mine eyes!
More Geese than Swans now live, more Fools than Wise."

== Gallery ==
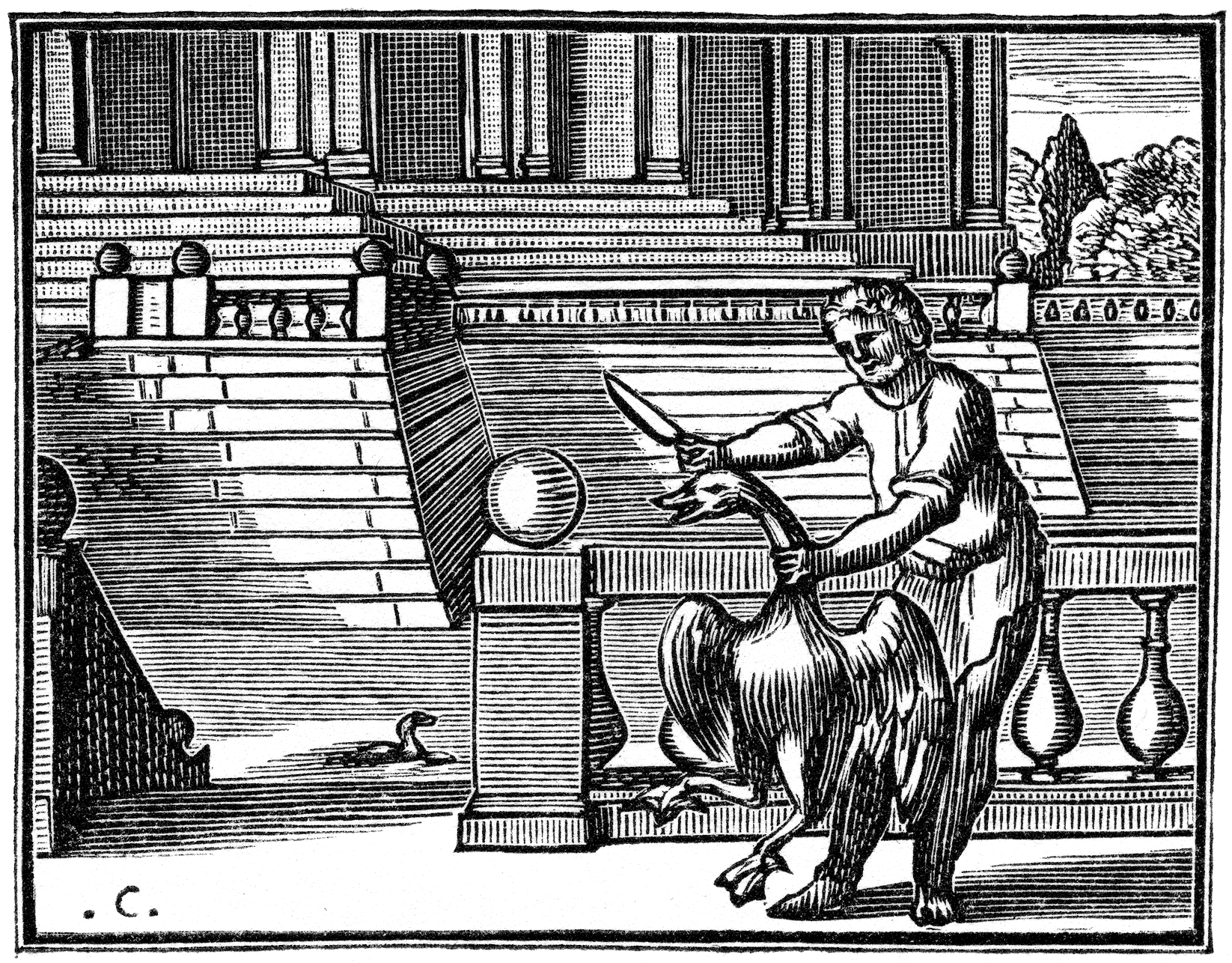
Illustration of the book Le Cygne et le Cuisinier of Jean de La Fontaine, by François Chauveau, 1668

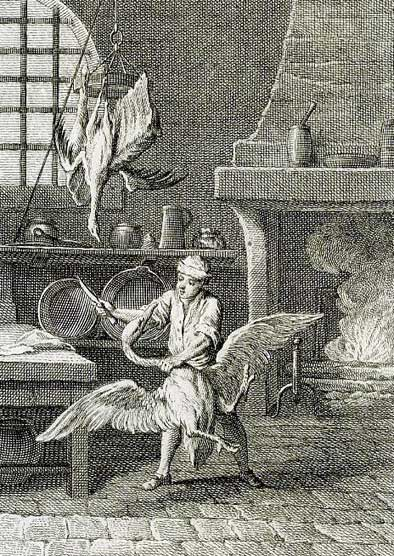
Illustration by Jean-Baptiste Oudry, 1729-1734 (print by Pierre Aveline, 1755)

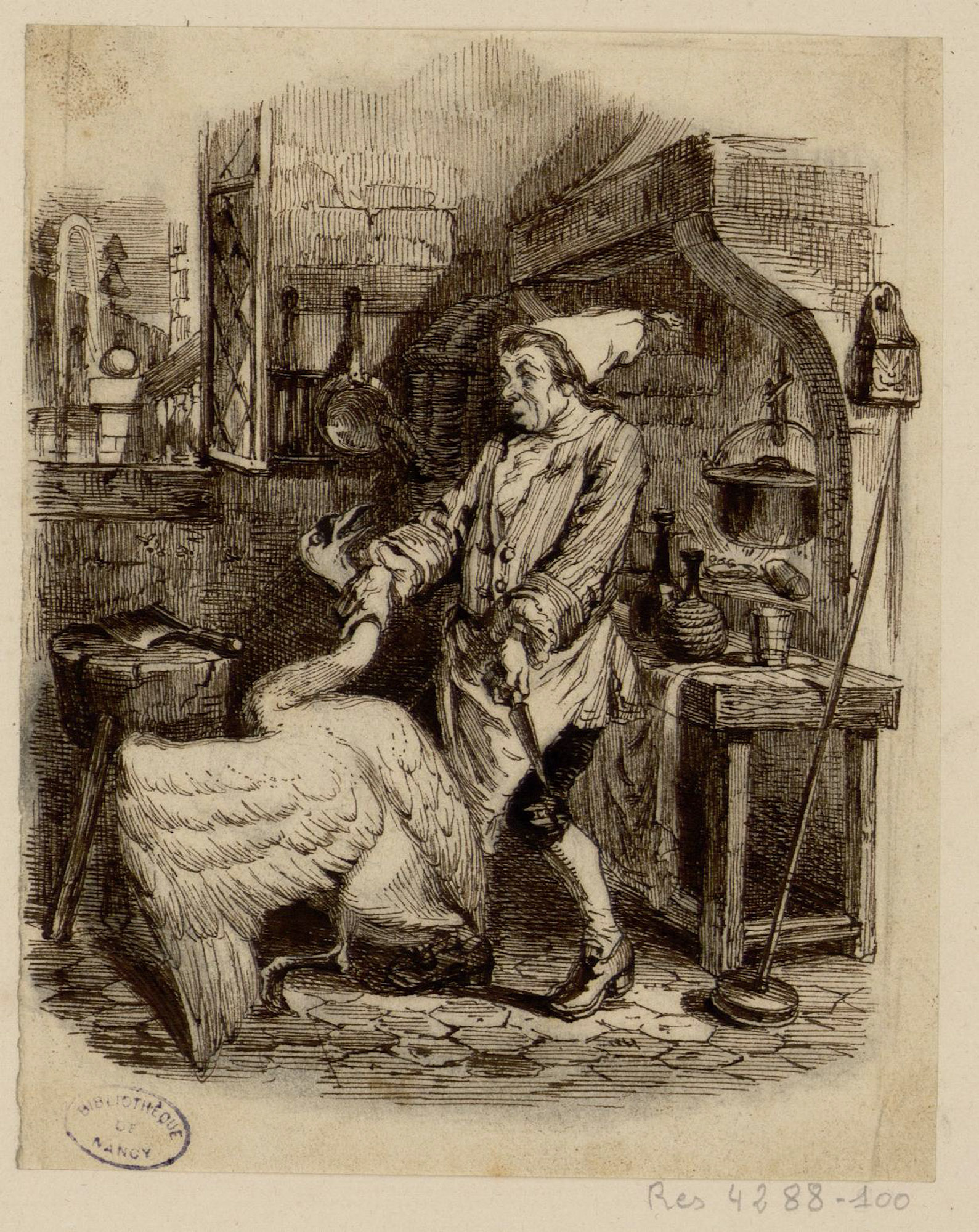
Illustration by Grandville, 1837-1838

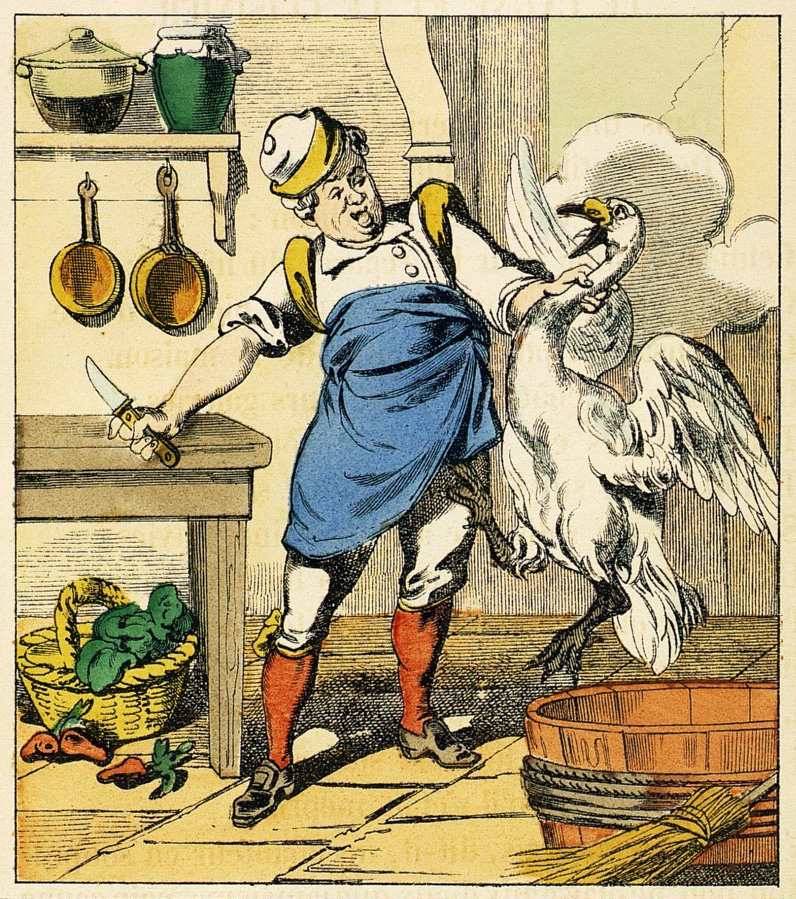
Épinal print of the Pellerin factory, 1875
