= The Farmer and the Stork =

Aesop's fable

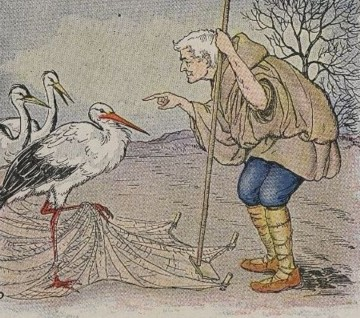
The Farmer and the Stork, illustrated by Milo Winter in a 1919 Aesop anthology

The Farmer and the Stork is one of Aesop's Fables which appears in Greek in the collections of both Babrius and Aphthonius and has differed little in the telling over the centuries. The story relates how a farmer plants traps in his field to catch the cranes and geese that are stealing the seeds he has sown. When he checks the traps, he finds among the other birds a stork, who pleads to be spared because it is harmless and has taken no part in the theft. The farmer replies that since it has been caught in the company of thieves, it must suffer the same fate. The moral of the story, which is announced beforehand in the oldest texts, is that associating with bad companions will lead to bad consequences.

Although the story line remains more or less constant, the fable has been differently titled. In the Perry Index, where it is numbered 194, it is a fowler who has caught the stork in his nets. In his catalogue of the fables, Adrados refers simply to a bird-catcher and relates the story of a farmer, as does the Neo-Latin poet Hieronymus Osius (1564). For William Caxton (1484) he was a labourer and in Samuel Croxall's collection (1722) he is called a husbandman.
