= The Miser and his Gold =

Aesop's fable

The Miser and his Gold (or Treasure) is one of Aesop's Fables that deals directly with human weaknesses, in this case the wrong use of possessions. Since this is a story dealing only with humans, it allows the point to be made directly through the medium of speech rather than be surmised from the situation. It is numbered 225 in the Perry Index.

== Aesop's Fable ==
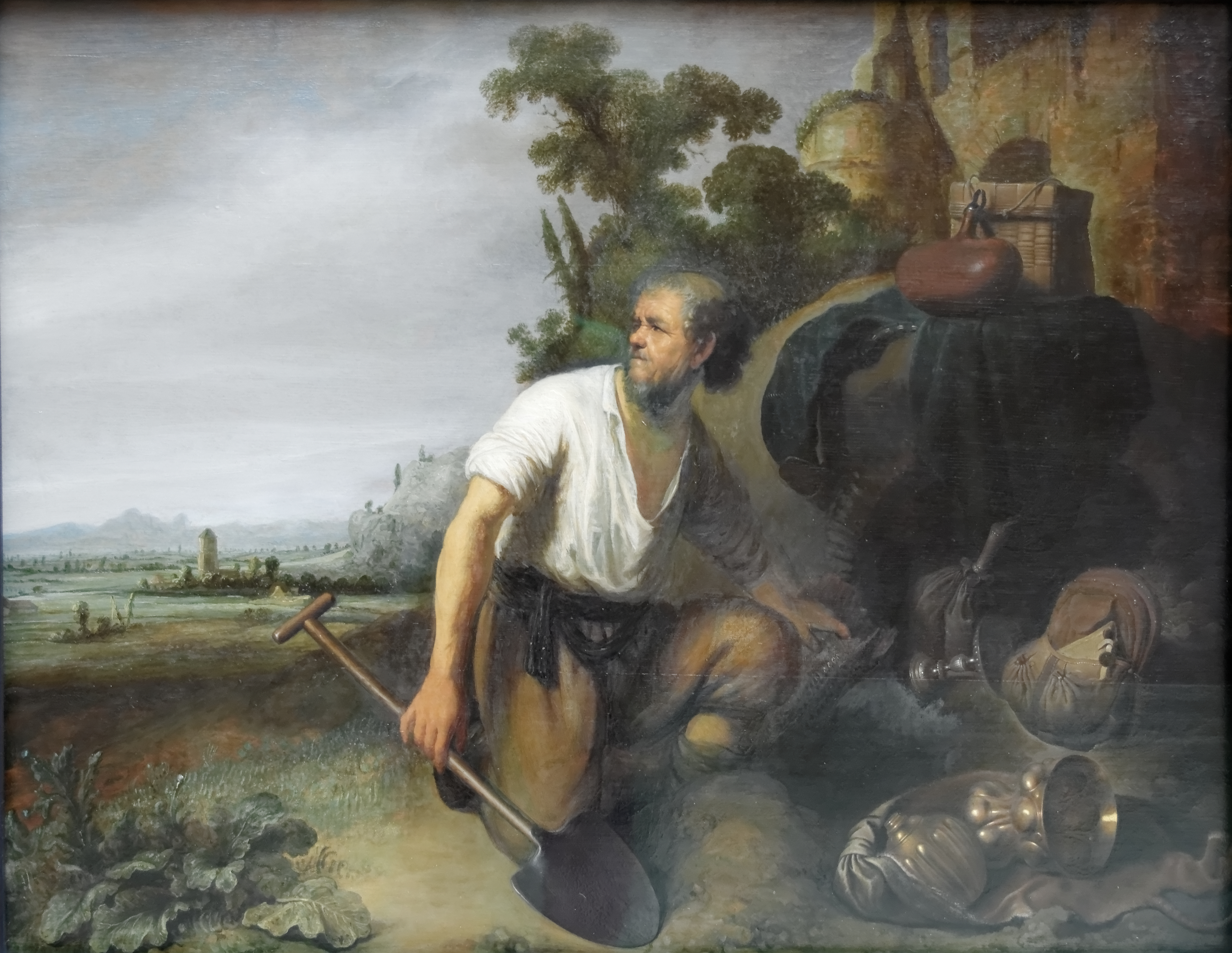
Parable of the Hidden Treasure by Rembrandt (c. 1630)

The basic story concerns a miser who reduced his riches to a lump of gold, which he buried. Coming back to view it every day, he was spied on and his treasure stolen. As the man bewailed his loss, he was consoled by a neighbour that he might as well bury a stone (or return to look at the hole) and it would serve the same purpose for all the good his money had done him or that he had done with his money.

Since versions of the fable were confined to Greek, it only began to gain greater currency during the European Renaissance. Gabriele Faerno made it the subject of a Latin poem in his Centum Fabulae (1563). In England it was included in collections of Aesop's fables by Roger L'Estrange as "A miser burying his gold" and by Samuel Croxall as "The covetous man".

Appreciating the cut and thrust of the argument, the composer Jerzy Sapieyevski included the fable as the fourth his Aesop Suite (1984), set for brass quintet and narrator, as an example of how 'musical elements lurk in gifted oratorical arguments'.

== Alternative versions ==
The story was made the occasion for commenting on the proper use of riches by authors in both the East and the West. In Saadi Shirazi's Bostan (The Garden, 1257), the Persian poet retells it as "A miserly father and his prodigal son". The son spies on his father to discover where he has hidden his wealth, digs it up and substitutes a stone. When the father finds that it has all been squandered, his son declares that spending is what money is for, otherwise it is as useless as a stone. A similar variant is told by Vasily Maykov, where a man living in the miser's house (possibly a relative of his and possibly not) is tired of living as a pauper, so he substitutes the gold in his sacks for sand. A folk variant told about Nasreddin has him settle in a city where people boast of the pots full of gold they have stored at home. In turn, he starts boasting of his own pots, which he has filled with pebbles, asking when found out, "Since the jars were covered and idle, what difference in the least does it make what might be inside them?".

In La Fontaine's Fables, where the fable appears as L'avare qui a perdu son trésor (IV.20), the story is made the occasion for a meditation on the nature of ownership. It begins with the statement 'Possessions have no value till we use them' and uses the story as an illustration of someone who is owned by the gold rather than being its owner. In Germany, Gotthold Ephraim Lessing gave the ending an additional twist in his retelling. What drives the miser to distraction, in addition to his loss, is that someone else is the richer for it.

Meanwhile, a parallel fable had entered European literature based upon a symmetrical two-line epigram in the Greek Anthology, once ascribed to Plato but more plausibly to Statillius Flaccus. A man, intending to hang himself, discovered hidden gold and left the rope behind him; the man who had hidden the gold, not finding it, hanged himself with the noose he found in its place. The 3rd century CE Latin poet Ausonius made a four-line version, the Tudor poet Thomas Wyatt extended this to eight lines and the Elizabethan George Turberville to twelve. Early in the 17th century, John Donne alluded to the story and reduced it to a couplet again:

Look, how he look'd that hid the gold, his hope,
And at return found nothing but a rope.

The longest telling and interpretation of the episode was in the 76 lines of Guillaume Guéroult's First Book of Emblems (1550) under the title "Man proposes but God disposes". In the following century, La Fontaine added this story too to his Fables as the lengthy "The treasure and the two men" (IX.15) in which the miser finds comfort in the thought that at least he is hanging himself at another's expense.
