= The Crow and the Sheep =

Aesop's fable

An etching titled "The Jackdaw and the Ram" from an 1811 album of fables

The Crow and the Sheep is one of Aesop's Fables and is numbered 553 in the Perry Index. Only Latin versions of it remain.

A sheep reproaches a crow that has perched on its back: 'If you had treated a dog in this way, you would have had your deserts from his sharp teeth.' To this the bird replies, 'I despise the weak and yield to the strong. I know whom I may bully and whom I must flatter; and I thus prolong my life to a good old age.'

In Marie de France's 12th century version, the sheep is annoyed at having its wool pulled out. Samuel Croxall retitled the tale "The Jackdaw and the Sheep" in his 1722 collection and made the sheep complain of the bird's chattering. The accompanying illustration was imitated on the brownware pottery series issued by Wedgwood in 1775.

Gotthold Ephraim Lessing changed the power relationship in his satirical rewriting titled "The Sheep and the Swallow". The sheep attempts to shake the bird off when it comes seeking wool for its nest. When the swallow complains that the sheep is ready enough to allow the shepherd to take all her wool, she replies that the shepherd is politer.
