= The Fox, the Flies and the Hedgehog =

Aesop's fable

The fable of The Fox, the Flies and the Hedgehog is ascribed to Aesop's Fables. From its beginning it was applied satirically to political leaders and is numbered 427 in the Perry Index.

== The fable ==
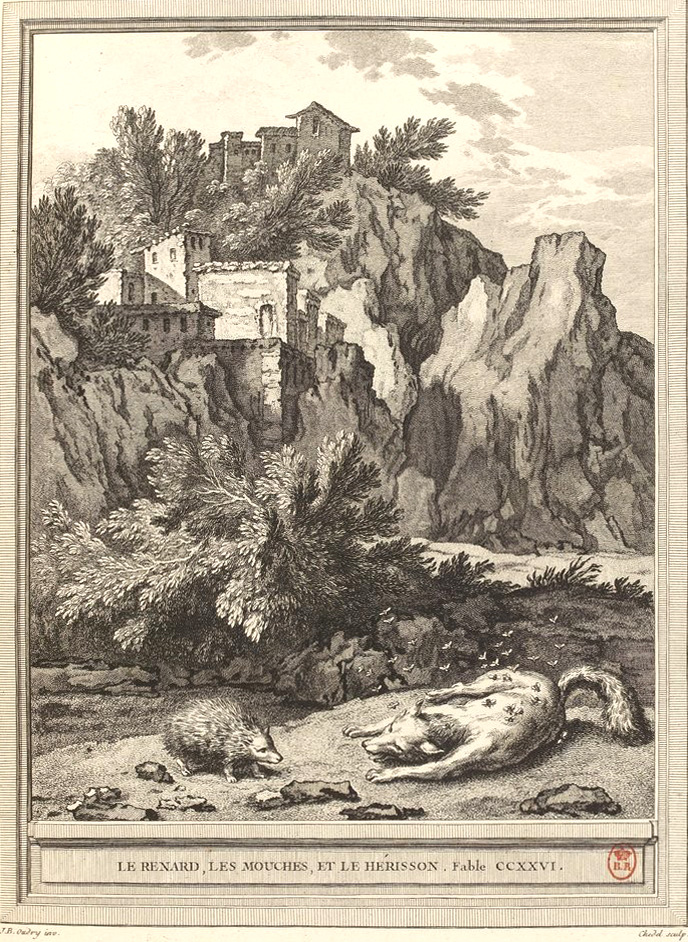
Jean-Baptiste Oudry's design for La Fontaine's fable, 1759

An enfeebled fox is plagued by flies, ticks or mosquitoes, of which a hedgehog offers to rid her. The fox refuses such help on the grounds that the insects have already gorged themselves on her blood and hardly trouble her now, but they would inevitably be succeeded by new swarms if removed. The fable is mentioned by Aristotle in his work on Rhetoric (II.20) as an example of Aesop's way of teaching a political lesson through a humorous example. The context in this case was said to be the trial of a demagogue; Aesop pointed out that, since self-interested politicians are a necessary evil, to replace one who has already exploited the state with others who have yet to satisfy their greed would only make the situation worse.

The reason for the fox's enfeebled state is that, while crossing a river, she has been swept into the mud on the other bank and cannot free herself. These circumstances are repeated in the neo-Latin verse of Gabriele Faerno's fable collection (1563), which closes on the sentiment

Who seeks a ruler to reverse
Calls in another that is worse.

Aristotle's version of the fable is also followed by Samuel Croxall in his prose collection of The Fables of Æsop (1722).

The story in La Fontaine's Fables (1694) is more or less the same, except that the fox has been wounded in the chase. La Fontaine too mentions Aristotle and the political lesson that he draws, while the circumstances are repeated in Brooke Boothby's very short poetic version. William Somervile adapted the fable more long-windedly into "The wounded man and the swarm of flies", taking sixteen lines to relate the story told of a "Lazar" (leper) and fifteen to draw the moral.
