= The Eagle and the Fox =

Aesop's fable

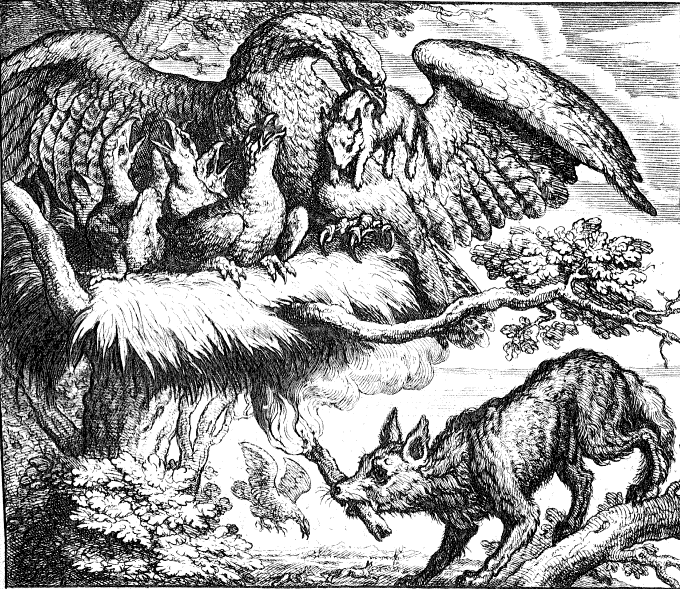
An illustration of the fable by Francis Barlow, 1687

The Eagle and the Fox is a fable of friendship betrayed and avenged. Counted as one of Aesop's Fables, it is numbered 1 in the Perry Index. The central situation concerns an eagle that seizes a fox's cubs and bears them off to feed its young. There are then alternative endings to the story, in one of which the fox exacts restitution, while in the other it gains retribution for its injury.

== A fable with alternative endings ==
The fable's Latin version by Phaedrus is prefaced by the statement that the powerful should fear revenge from the humble that they harm. In his account, the mother fox pulls a flaming branch from an altar and threatens to burn down the tree in which the marauding eagle has nested. Fearing for the safety of its own young, the eagle restores the cubs. This was the version taken up in early English collections of Aesop's fables, including those of William Caxton, Francis Barlow, and Samuel Croxall. Marie de France also used this story in her 12th century Anglo-Norman account, with the additional detail that the fox had first bundled firewood around the tree. Her comment on the situation highlights the uselessness of appealing to those who use arbitrary force: "The proud rich man will never have mercy on the poor man because of his hue and cry, but if the poor man could wreak vengeance on him, then you would see the rich man bow."

In an alternative version, the eagle and the fox are friends and decide to live near each other. After the eagle betrays their friendship by stealing the fox's cubs and feeding them to its young, the fox prays for vengeance. This is brought about when the eagle seizes meat from a sacrificial altar to which a glowing charcoal is attached and sets fire to its nest. The roasted chicks tumble to the foot of the tree, where they are eaten by the fox. This version predates Aesop, since Archilochus (c. 650 BCE) relates how the friendship between the two is betrayed and the fox appeals to Zeus. By the time of Aristophanes, however, the story of the bad alliance between the two creatures is attributed to Aesop.

During the Renaissance, the fable was made the subject of two Latin poems by Hieronymus Osius and another by Gabriele Faerno. In the contemporary Fables d'Esope by Gilles Corrozet (1547), as in Charles Perrault's Fables (1697), the fox himself sets fire to the tree and eats the roasted chicks as they fall. Perrault's conclusion is that "There is no pain greater/ Unmerited by a traitor", where for Pieter de la Court in his Sinryke Fabulen (1685), "Better a hound for friend than foe" (beeter en hond ten vriende als ten vyande). The Dutch work, with its topical "explications", was translated into English as Fables Moral and Political in 1703. A decade before, Roger L'Estrange had recorded the fable too and, with the fox's prayer in mind, gave it the moral, "God reserves to himself the Punishment of faithless and oppressing Governours, and the vindication of his own Worship and Altars".

There was one other variation of the story in the 9th-century Syriac translation attributed to Syntipas. In this the fox's prayer for retribution is answered when the stolen sacrificial meat proves too hot for the eaglets and they choke to death.

== The Rabbit and the Eagle ==
An original fable by Laurentius Abstemius demonstrates the kinship between the story of "The Eagle and the Fox" and another by Aesop about The Eagle and the Beetle. In the Abstemius story, an eagle seizes some young rabbits to feed its young and tears them to pieces despite their mother's plea for mercy, thinking that an earth-bound creature could do it no harm. But the mother burrowed under the tree in which the eagle had nested, so that it was felled by the wind and the young eagle chicks eaten by wild beasts. Abstemius then comments that "This fable shows no one, trusting in his own power, should despise those who are weaker than they are, since sometimes those who are less powerful can get revenge for the wrongs done to them by the more powerful."

The moral and the arrogant refusal of mercy are points in common with "The Beetle and the Eagle", while the injury done to the young of an animal from whom no revenge is expected because it cannot take to the air links the fable thematically with "The Eagle and the Fox". It had little currency in English. Roger L'Estrange included it in his collection, crediting it to Abstemius, with the variation that the whole rabbit warren combined to undermine the tree. In the early Victorian era this version reappeared without attribution in the compilation Fables: Original and Selected (London 1839).
