= The Fox and the Sick Lion =

Aesop's fable

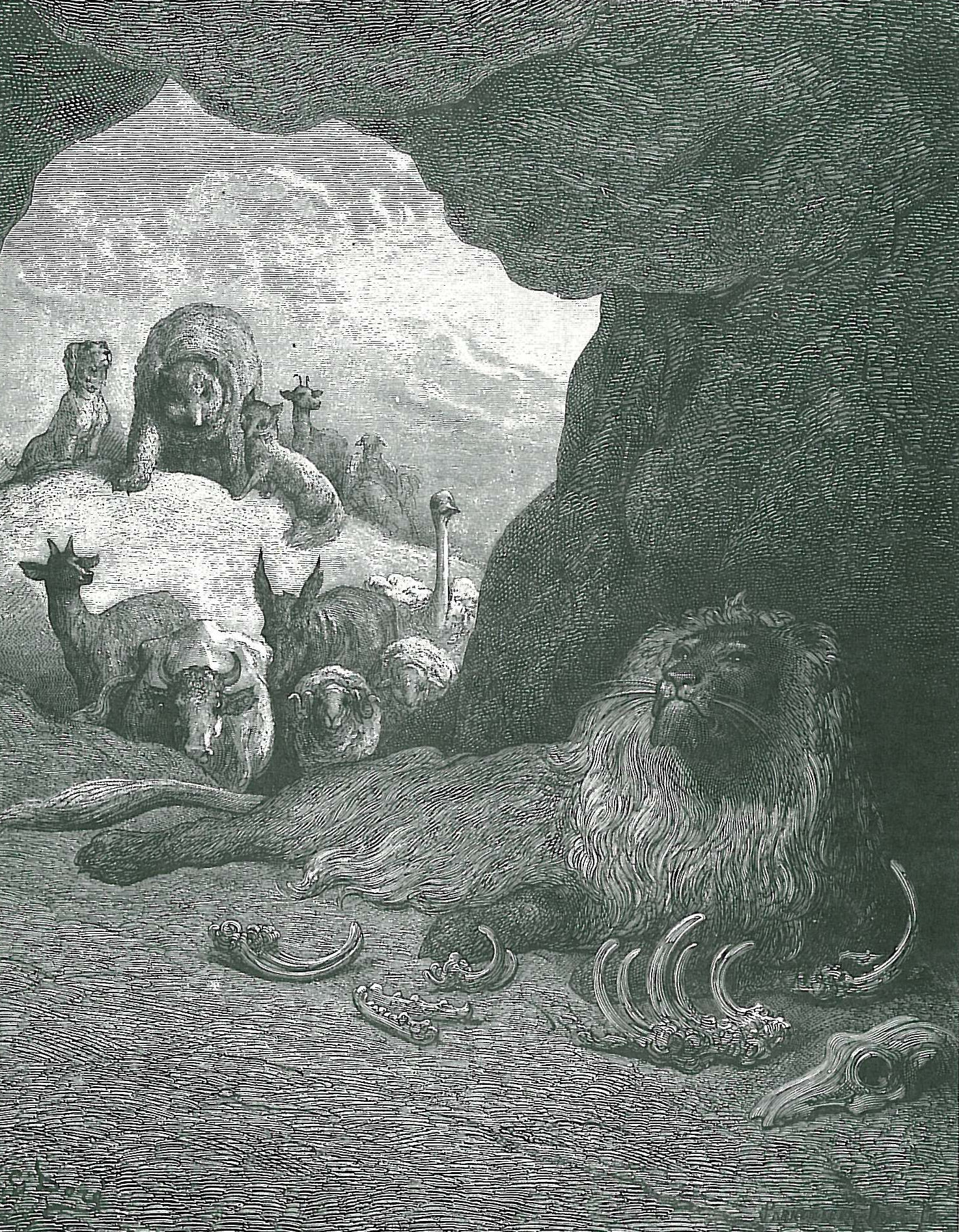
Illustration of La Fontaine's fable by Gustave Doré.

The Fox and the Sick Lion is one of Aesop's Fables, well known from Classical times and numbered 142 in the Perry Index. There is also an Indian analogue. Interpretations of the story's meaning have differed widely in the course of two and a half millennia.

== Ancient versions ==
A lion grown too old and weak to hunt pretended to be sick as a ruse and ate the animals that came to visit him in his cave. But the fox only greeted him from outside and, on being asked why it did not enter, replied "Because I can only see tracks going in, but none coming out".

The earliest application of the fable is in an economic context in First Alcibiades, a dialogue often ascribed to Plato and dated to the 4th century BCE. There Socrates tries to dissuade a young man from following a political career and, in describing the Spartan economy, says:

and as to gold and silver, there is more of them in Lacedaemon than in all the rest of Hellas, for during many generations gold has been always flowing in to them from the whole Hellenic world, and often from the barbarian also, and never going out, as in the fable of Aesop the fox said to the lion, 'The prints of the feet of those going in are distinct enough'- but who ever saw the trace of money going out of Lacedaemon?

The fable is also one among several to which the Latin poet Horace alluded in his work, seeing in it the moral lesson that once tainted with vice there is no returning. Condemning the get-rich-quick culture of the Roman bankers in his first Epistle, he comments:

If the people of Rome chanced to ask me why
I delight in the same colonnades as them, yet not
the same opinions, nor follow or flee what they love
or hate, I'd reply as the wary fox once responded to
the sick lion: Because those tracks I can see scare me,
they all lead towards your den and none lead away.

There is a similar Indian incident in the Buddhist Nalapana Jataka, in which a monkey king saved his troop from destruction by a water-ogre by reconnoitering a jungle pool from which they wished to drink and reporting that "all the footprints led down into the water, but none came back."

== Reasons for caution ==
The moral drawn in Mediaeval Latin retellings of the fable such as those of Adémar de Chabannes and Romulus Anglicus was that one should learn from the misfortunes of others, but it was also given a political slant by the additional comment that "it is easier to enter the house of a great lord than to get out of it", as William Caxton expressed it in his English version. Hieronymus Osius, however, confined himself to making the story's lesson that the wise man notes not only signs of danger but also learns from them to be cautious. The necessity of being wary in all one's enterprises, "keeping in view the profit and loss", was also the message of Gilles Corrozet's emblematic use of the fable in his Hecatomographie (1540).

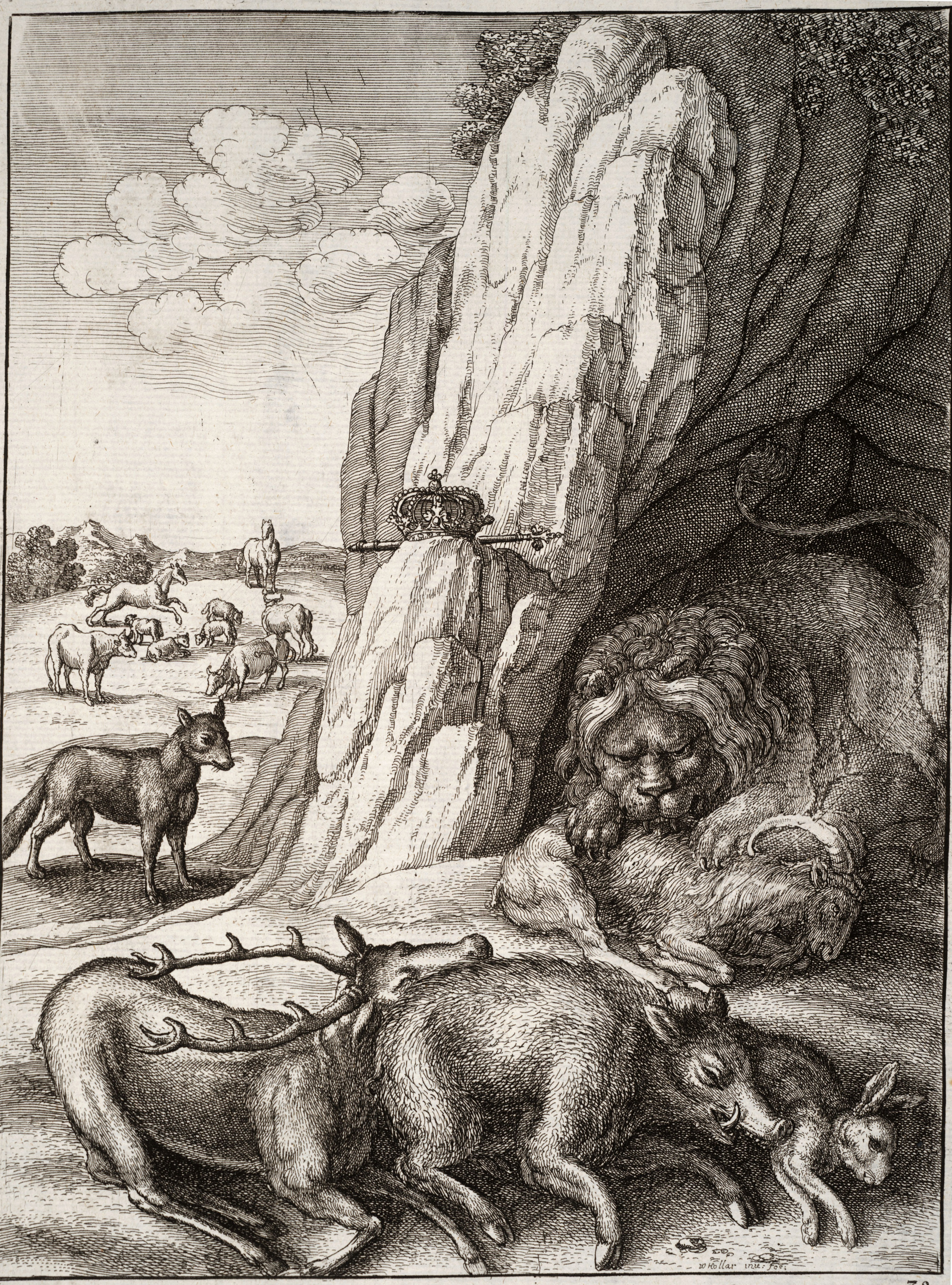
The Wenceslaus Hollar print of the fable against trust in kings, 1673

During the 17th century the fable was almost always interpreted as a warning against association with rulers. Wenceslas Hollar emphasised the political connection in his illustration of The Fables of Aesop (1673). At the mouth of a cave, a crown and sceptre are laid prominently on rocks as the lion feasts on its slaughtered visitors. The same point is made by Pieter de la Court in his Sinryke Fabulen (Amsterdam, 1685). Above the woodcut illustrating the fable is the Dutch distich Een oud hoveling, een oud schoveling (an old courtier, an old survivor), while below it is the Latin proverb Cum principibus ut cum igne (With princes as with fire, be wary).

In Jean de La Fontaine's Fables additional details are drawn from royal practice. The lion issues a safe conduct (passeport) to the deluded animals bidden to visit him. In reply the foxes send back a note that echoes the former Latin conclusion: "While seeing how the beasts get in,/ We do not see how they get out". The inference to be drawn is that the word of the powerful is not to be trusted. Roger L'Estrange's 1692 narration follows La Fontaine in making communication between fox and lion an exchange of diplomatic notes but ends on the more pointed moral that "the kindness of ill-natur'd and designing People should be throughly consider'd and examin'd, before we give credit to them".

Later interpretations counsel resorting to reason in order to avoid harm, in this life or thereafter. Samuel Croxall ends the 'application' in his Fables of Aesop and Others (1722) on the thought that "it becomes us, as we are reasonable Creatures, to behave ourselves as such and to do as few Things as possible of which we may have Occasion to repent". Thomas Bewick, in his retelling of 1818, goes much further and proclaims a chauvinistic religious message. "There is no opinion, however impious or absurd, that has not its advocates in some quarter of the world. Whoever, therefore, takes up his creed upon trust, and grounds his principles on no better reason than his being a native or inhabitant of the regions wherein they prevail, becomes a disciple of Mahomet in Turkey, and of Confucius in China; a Jew, or a Pagan, as the accident of birth decides."
