= The Fly in the Soup =

Fable by Aesop

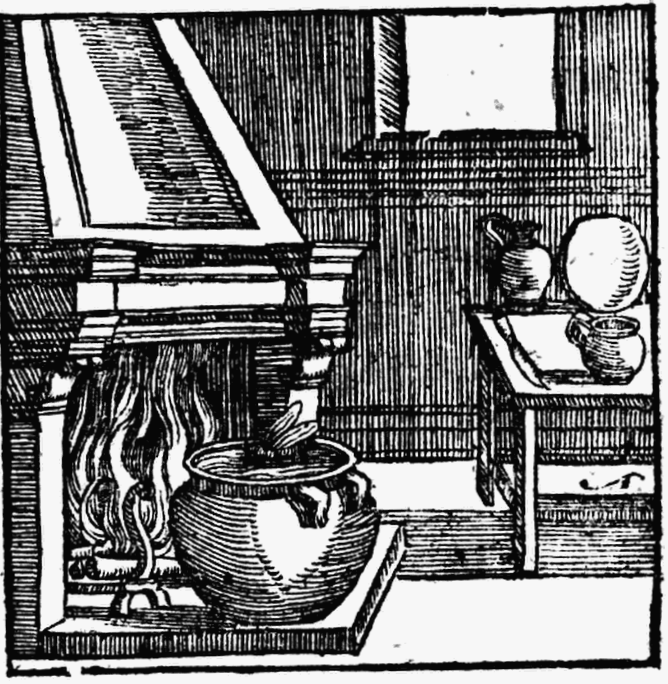
Pirro Ligorio's design for the fable of "The Fly (Musca) in the Soup"

The story of the fly that fell into the soup while it was cooking was a Greek fable recorded in both verse and prose and is numbered 167 in the Perry Index. Its lesson was to meet adverse circumstances with equanimity, but it was little recorded after Classical times.

== The fable ==
A fly falls into a soup pot and reflects before drowning, "I have eaten, I have drunk, I have taken a bath; if I die, what do I care?" Babrius records a variant in which it is a mouse that accepts its end in this philosophical way. Commenting on the fable, Laura Gibbs compares the dying mouse's thoughts with a similar sentiment at the end of Horace's Epistle to Florus: "You have played enough, eaten and drunk enough, it is time for you to leave" (Lusisti satis, edisti satis, atque bibistis: tempus abire tibi est).

In the Renaissance, the neo-Latin poet Gabriele Faerno included the version told of a fly in his Centum Fabulae (1563), ending on the advice to accept necessity with good grace. This assured the fable's continuity through many reprints into the 19th century. Charles Perrault translated Faerno's work into French verse in 1699 and Pierre de Frasnay included an independent version of the fable of the fly (La Mouche) in his Mythologie ou recueil des fables grecques, esopiques et sybaritiques (Orléans, 1750). Perrault's translations, after going through several editions, were included jointly with Faerno's originals in a London edition of 1743, while De Frasnay's poem was included in Ésope en trois langues (Paris, 1816), where it was preceded by a Greek prose version and Faerno's Latin. There was also a slightly earlier Latin prose version of the fable of the fly in Francesco de Furia's Fabulae Aesopicae (Florence, 1809), again preceded by its Greek version.
