= The Bird-catcher and the Blackbird =

Fable by Aesop

The Bird-catcher or Fowler and the Blackbird was one of Aesop's Fables, numbered 193 in the Perry Index. In Greek sources, it featured a lark, but French and English versions have always named the blackbird as the bird involved.

Modern European retellings of the fable include Giovanni Maria Verdizotti's 1570 version, which has a lark as the bird. The nearly contemporary French edition of 1582 however features a blackbird, and this is followed in Roger L'Estrange's 1692 collection.

An alternative tradition dating back to the Greek Anthology maintains that the blackbird is under the special protection of the gods, and cannot be trapped in nets.

== European versions ==
The account in Roger L'Estrange's collection of the fables (1692) follows the original closely except for the substitution of the bird's name. "As a Fowler was bending his net, a Black-Bird call'd to him at a distance, and ask'd him what he was doing. Why, says he, I am laying the Foundations of a City; and so the Bird-Man drew out of Sight. The Black-Bird mistrusting nothing, flew presently to the Bait in the Net, and was taken; and as the Man came running to lay hold of her; Friend, says the poor Black-Bird, if this be your way of Building, you'll have but few Inhabitants." Though the story is applicable to human credulousness in general, it has been given a political interpretation since earliest times that continued through most later commentaries.

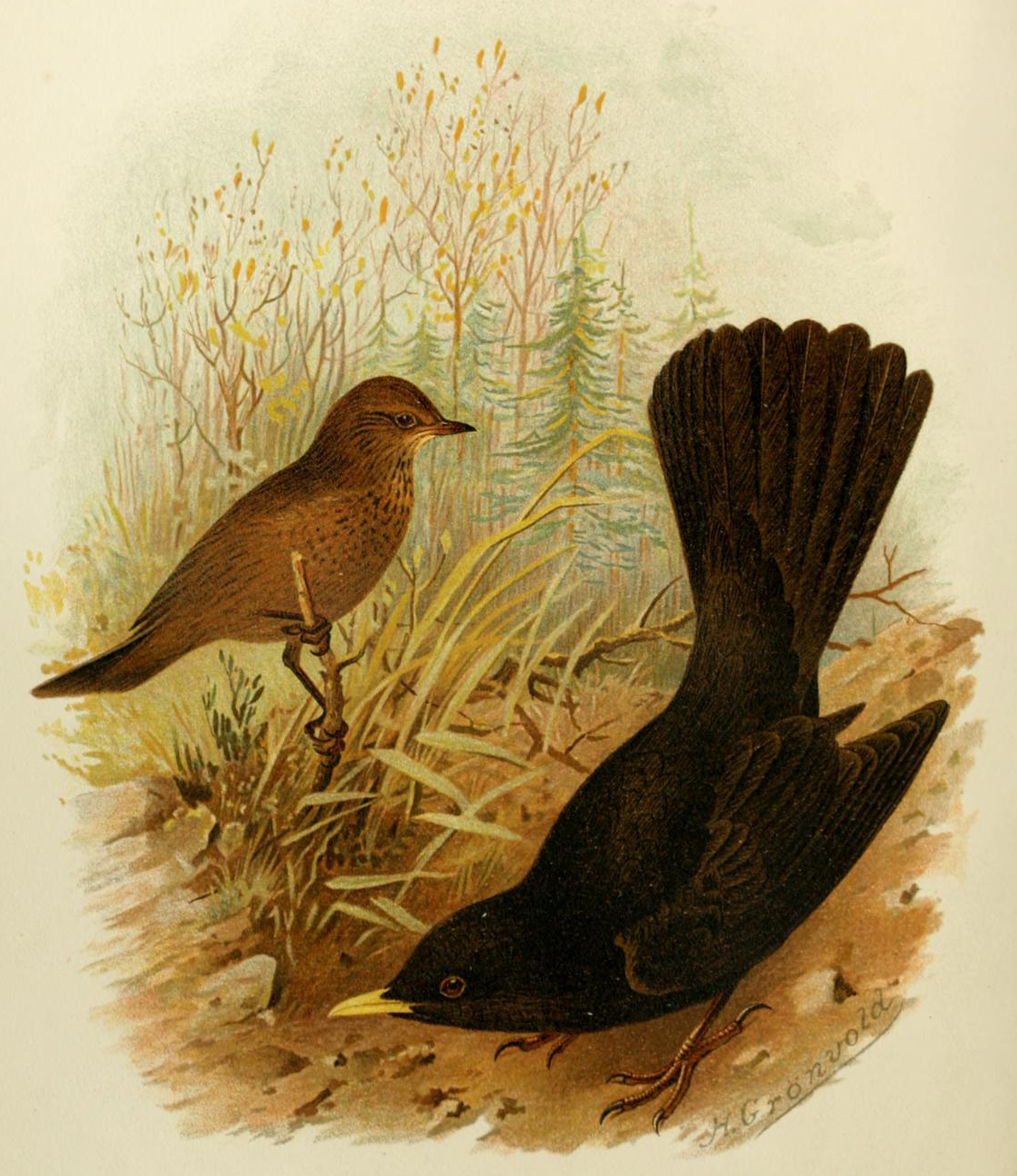
An illustration of the inquisitive blackbird by Henrik Grönvold, 1906

Although this version of the story only existed in Greek sources, one very like it occurs in the Syriac version of the story of Ahiqar, which goes back to the time of Aesop. Ahiqar has been betrayed by his adoptive son Nadan and among the reproaches for his conduct appears this reference: "A snare was set upon a dunghill and there came a sparrow and looked at it and said, 'What doest thou here?' And the snare said, 'I am praying to God.' The sparrow said, 'And what is that in thy mouth?' The snare said, 'Bread for guests.' Then the sparrow drew near and took it, and the snare caught him by the neck. And the sparrow said, as he was being shaken, 'If this is thy bread for guests, may the god to whom thou prayest never listen to thy voice.'" A much later Arabic recension begins with the inquisitive sparrow but then makes a lark the victim. This, however, may be evidence of contamination from a Greek source.

One of the earliest tellings of the Greek story in another European language was as Fable 31 in Giovanni Maria Verdizotti's "100 Moral Fables" (Cento favole morali, 1570). There the story is told of a lark (lodola), while a blackbird (merle) is the bird named in the nearly contemporary 1582 French edition of Aesop's fables, remaining so through the following centuries. In English tellings also it is always a blackbird that is named.

There is also a traditional tune in the Isle of Man that is called "The Fowler and the Blackbird" (Yn Eeanleyder as y Lhondoo), to which is sung the mysterious ballad "O what if the fowler my blackbird has taken", sometimes ascribed to Charles Dalmon. In 2010 the Greek text of the fable was set for octet and voice by Lefteris Kordis as part of his Songs for Aesop's Fables.

== An alternative tradition ==
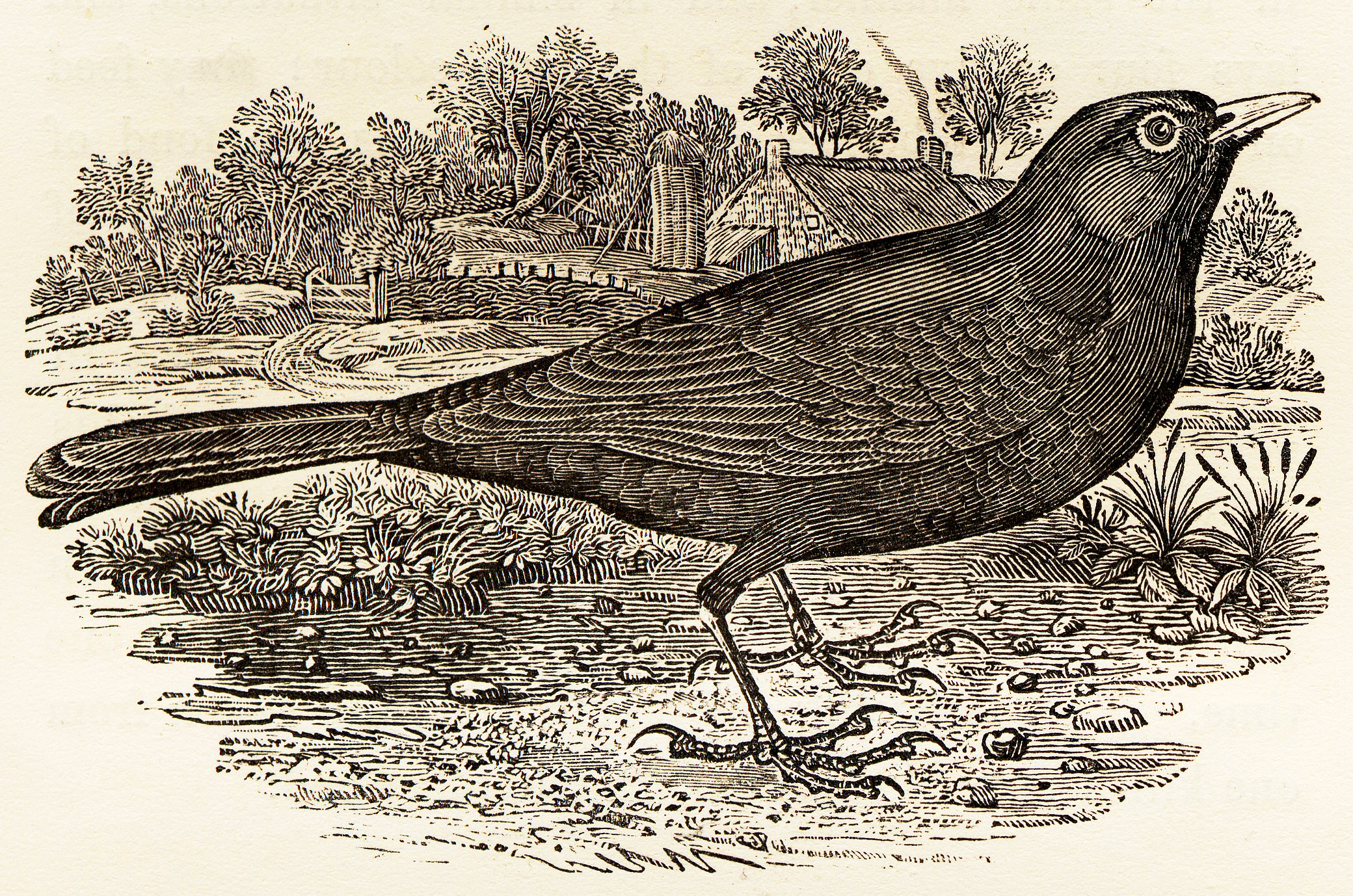
Wood engraving of male blackbird by Thomas Bewick, 1797

In his History of British Birds, Thomas Bewick says that blackbirds "readily suffer themselves to be caught with bird-lime, nooses and all sorts of snares". In general it was trapped for caging as a songbird rather than for food, but there existed an ancient Greek tradition that the songster was under the special protection of the gods and that nets could not hold it.

No less than three poems in the Greek Anthology preserve this belief. The earliest is by Archias of Antioch and concerns fieldfares that are trapped while the blackbird is left free since "the race of singers is holy". Antipater of Sidon tells of a blackbird and a thrush caught in separate snares, from which the blackbird escapes since "even deaf bird-snares feel compassion for singers". Finally, in the poem by Paulus Silentiarus, where a fieldfare and a blackbird are netted, it is Artemis herself, the goddess of hunting, who frees the songbird.
