= The Old Woman and the Doctor =

Fable by Aesop

The Old Woman and the Doctor (or Physician) is a story of Greek origin that was included among Aesop's Fables and later in the 4th century CE joke book, the Philogelos. It is numbered 57 in the Perry Index.

== A rare fable ==
This fable falls into the category of jokes that were added to the Aesop corpus through the attraction of his name. Because it was largely preserved in Greek sources, it was not noted in the rest of Europe until the Renaissance. One of its first appearances then was in an early Tudor period jest book, Merry Tales and Quick Answers (c. 1530), under the title "Of the olde woman that had sore eyes". The joke involves a woman who asks a surgeon (in this case) to cure her from approaching blindness on the understanding that he would not be paid until she was cured. The surgeon applied salves but stole from the house anything moveable during the course of his visits. Once the cure was completed, the woman refused him payment on the grounds that now her sight was worse than ever, since she could not see any of her household effects.

The story was rendered into Latin by the Papal scholar Gabriele Faerno and appeared in his collection of a hundred fables (1563) under the title "Mulier et medicus". His reason for preserving so slight a work was to amuse the children for whose education the book was destined. The moral he draws from it is that through evil-doing one loses the reward of any good one has done.

Other English treatments include Roger L'Estrange's in his Fables of Aesop (1692), which is little different from the version in Merry Tales and Quick Answers and comes to the cynical conclusion that 'There are few good Offices done for other People, which the Benefactor does not hope to be the better himself for't'. A decade later Thomas Yalden uses the tale for political propaganda in his Aesop at Court (1702). In his telling, the woman is despoiled by a whole team of doctors whom he likens to ministers in Parliament stealing English wealth to prosecute a foreign war.
