= The Fox and the Mask =

Fable by Aesop

The Fox and the Mask is one of Aesop's Fables, of which there are both Greek and Latin variants. It is numbered 27 in the Perry Index.

== A fable for the empty-headed ==
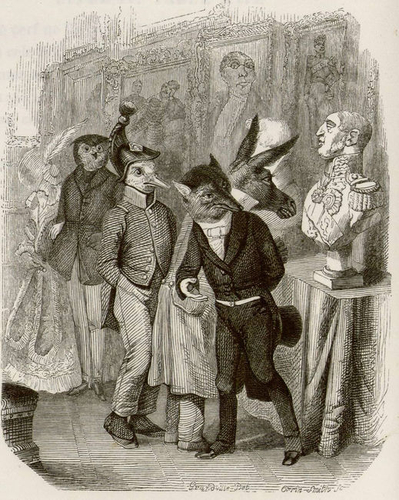
J.J.Grandville's illustration of La Fontaine's Fables, 1838

The fable is always briefly stated and seems chiefly the vehicle for a criticism of the good-looking but stupid upper class. A fox comes across a mask anciently used by actors; after an examination, it remarks, 'So full of beauty, so empty of brains!' The Latin version of this, generally shortened to caput vacuum cerebro, then became proverbial. It is recorded by Erasmus in his Adagia, along with its Greek equivalent (Ὦ οἷα κεφαλὴ, καὶ ἐγκέφαλον ούκ ἔχει), with the explanation that it originates from Aesop's fable.

There are different versions of the story, sometimes involving a wolf contemplating the broken head of a statue. Its earliest English appearance is in William Caxton's collection of the fables (1484), under the title of "The wulf and the dede man's hede", as an example of the proposition that 'Many one ben whiche haue grete worship and glorye but noo prudence' . But Andrea Alciato, the influential Italian originator of the emblem book, generally pictures a fox contemplating a mask. The six-line Latin poem accompanying it declares that it is mind, not outward form, that is most important (Mentem, non formam, plus pollere). This version also appeared in a Neo-Latin poem by Gabriele Faerno.

The version in La Fontaine's Fables is told of a fox and a bust (IV.14). However, the fable is merely alluded to in his poem, which is more a meditation on appearance and comments at the end that the fox's remark "to many a lord applies". When the caricaturist J. J. Grandville illustrated the Fables in 1838 he updated the social comment, using animals instead of humans. At an Academy exhibition, a fox glances sideways at a pompous portrait bust that is being examined closely by an ass, with the figures of a uniformed duck and an owlish dandy in the background.

The German philosopher Gotthold Ephraim Lessing also reinterpreted the fable in 1759, identifying chatterers as its target. In England it was young children who ignore their studies to whom the versified fable of "The Fox and the Mask" was applied by Richard Scrafton Sharpe in his Old friends in a new dress: familiar fables in verse (London, 1807). Later in the century, W. S. Gilbert revisited the dichotomy between reality and representation in his comic poem "The Pantomime 'Super' to His Mask". There the actor condemns the mask as being brainless and reliant on him for the histrionic success of the inane emotions it expresses. The mask replies that if the actor looked within he would find a correspondence between what he enacts and his true personality.
