= The Goat and the Vine =

Fable by Aesop

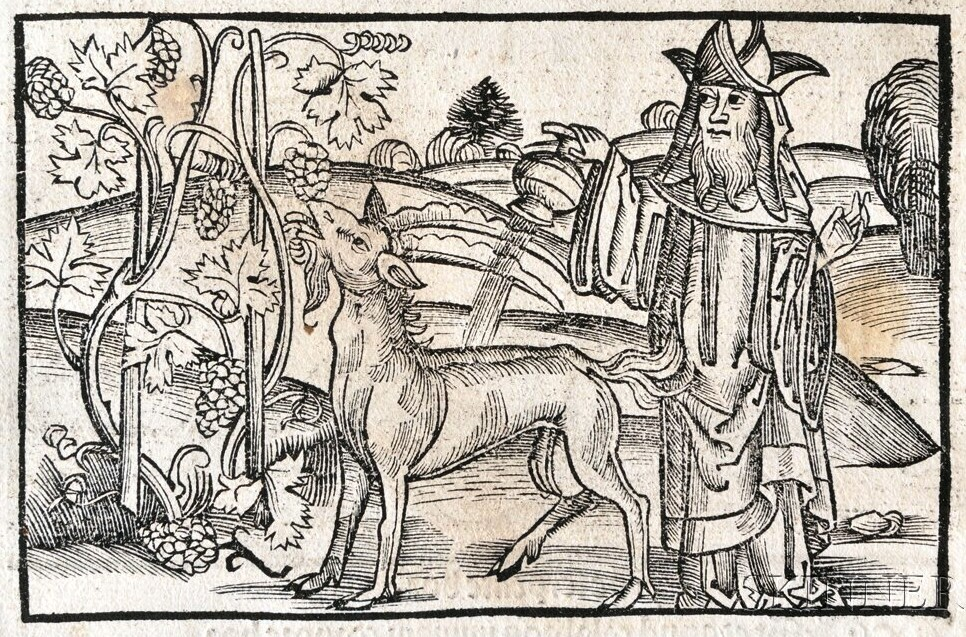
A woodcut of the fable from Sebastian Brant's 1501 collection

The Goat and the Vine is counted as one of Aesop's Fables and is numbered 374 in the Perry Index. There is also a West Asian variant.

== The fable and its versions ==
When a goat starts eating a vine's leaves and shoots, the vine retorts that it will still have enough juice left to produce grapes, the wine from which will be poured over it when the goat is sacrificed. The earliest record of the fable is in an epigram by Leonidas of Tarentum, who lived in the area of southern Italy colonised by Greeks in the 3rd century BCE. Later Greek references come from Western Asia, including another epigram by Evenus of Ascalon containing simply the vine's retort and the prose collection of fables by Aphthonius of Antioch. Elsewhere in Europe it first appeared in Latin fable collections from German language areas, including Sebastian Brant's Esopi Appologi sive Mythologi (1501) and the 150 poems based on fables by Pantaleon Candidus (1604). The tale only began to appear in English fable collections in the 19th century.

In ancient times there was an alternative version of the fable that appeared in various recensions of the story of Ahiqar from the first century CE. In the Arabic version, a gazelle nibbles a madder plant, which threatens that it will be used to tan the goat's hide when the animal is killed and skinned. Madder or other tanning agents make a similar threat in the Syriac, Armenian and Slavonic versions of the story, but the goat or deer involved answers that, while this may happen in the future, for the present it needs to satisfy its hunger.
