= The Two Pots =

Aesop's fable

The Two Pots is one of Aesop's Fables and numbered 378 in the Perry Index. The fable may stem from proverbial sources.

== The Fable ==
There is a short Greek version of the fable and a longer, more circumstantial late Latin poem by Avianus. It concerns two pots, one of earthenware and the other of metal, that are being swept along a river. While the metal pot is willing that they should journey together, the clay pot hopes it will keep its distance for 'Whether the wave crashes me into you or you into me, in either case I will be the only victim'. The moral drawn is that equal partnership is best, and especially that the poor or powerless should avoid the company of the powerful.

In this connection, there is a likeness between the story and a passage in the deuterocanonical biblical Book of Ecclesiasticus that advises caution in such unequal relationships: 'Have no fellowship with one that is richer than thyself. What agreement shall the earthen pot have with the kettle? For if they knock one against the other, it shall be broken' (13.2–3). Since this particular text is in Greek and dates from the 2nd century BCE, it is possible that the passage quoted and the fable are both based on a popular proverb. But there is also a connection with a later Talmudic proverb which underlines the no-win situation of the fable: 'If a pot falls upon a stone, woe to the pot; if a stone falls upon a pot, woe to the pot; either way, woe to the pot' (Esther Rabbah, 7:10).

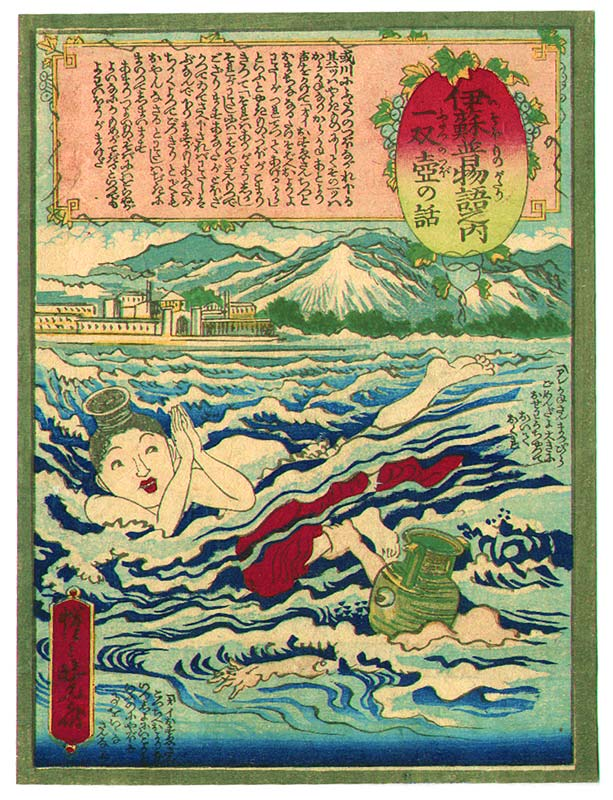
A Japanese print of Aesop's fable by Kawanabe Kyosai dating from 1870–80

Another non-Greek connection with this proverbial lore occurs in the Indian Panchatantra. In its second section, which deals with the gaining of friends, there is a long debate between Hiranyaka the rat and Laghupatanaka the crow about partnership between such natural enemies as themselves. One of the points made is that 'Friendship with bad men is like a pot of clay, easy to break but difficult to rejoin. With good men it is like a pot of gold, difficult to break but easy to mend.' Here once again we find earthenware and metal pots contrasted.

The connection with the passage in Ecclesiasticus was noted by Andrea Alciato in the various editions of his Emblemata. The aim of his collection was to point a moral lesson through an iconic illustration, supported by Latin verses (and translations into other languages) and a commentary. The fable of the two pots was chosen to illustrate the Latin proverb Aliquid mali propter vicinum malum (Bad comes of a bad neighbour), which Erasmus had included in his Adagia (Adage 32). The English poet Geoffrey Whitney followed Alciato in all this, using an illustration from one of his editions in his Choice of Emblemes (1568), but supporting it with an 18-line poem of his own. The final stanza sums up the meaning of the fable:

The running streame, this worldlie sea dothe shewe;
The pottes present the mightie, and the pore:
Whoe here, a time are tosséd too and froe,
But if the meane dwell nighe the mighties dore,

He maie be hurte, but cannot hurte againe,
Then like, to like: or beste alone remaine.

While the title of Aesop's fable is almost always given as "The Two Pots", La Fontaine's Fables contrast their different constituents in a rather different fable based on it, Le pot de terre et le pot de fer (Fables V.2). In this the iron pot proposes a journey together to the clay pot, which is only persuaded by the stronger pot's offer to protect him. When they are jostled together on their way, the clay pot is shattered and only has himself to blame. 'Only equals should associate' is the conclusion. A French proverb derives from this fable, where the phrase 'It's the iron pot against the clay pot' (C'est le pot de fer contre le pot de terre) is used in cases when the weak come off worst. In 1713 Anne Finch, Countess of Winchilsea, was to use La Fontaine's version of the story in her lively recreation, "The Brass-Pot and Stone-Jugg".

== Artistic interpretations ==
Book illustrations of Aesop's fable inevitably picture two contrasting pots being carried along a river. In the lively woodblock print by the Japanese artist Kawanabe Kyosai, the pots are given human forms and shown tossed on the waves of a heavy sea. There the earthen pot is desperately fending off the friendly approach of the metal pot. In the distance is a town with mountains behind it. How much Kyosai has added is plain when one compares his version with the one by John Tenniel on which it is based. The gated town in the background is almost identical, but Tenniel shows the two pots becalmed in an eddy near the mouth of an estuary. This in turn looks back to the various illustrations in Alciato's Book of Emblems, especially that of the 1591 edition. There the pots are tossed on waves as they are carried towards the sea; in the background are mountains with a town at their foot and a castle perched on a height.

Two French composers have set La Fontaine's fable. Isabelle Aboulker among Les Fables enchantées (1979) and Dominique Preschez (1954–) as the second of her Trois fables en une (1995).
