= The Cock, the Dog and the Fox =

Aesop's fable

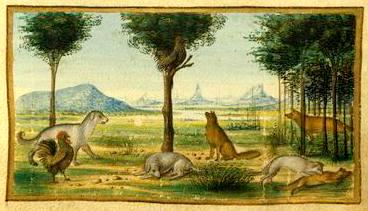
A painting of the fable in a Greek manuscript, c. 1470

The Cock, the Dog and the Fox is one of Aesop's Fables and appears as number 252 in the Perry Index. Although it has similarities with other fables where a predator flatters a bird, such as The Fox and the Crow and Chanticleer and the Fox, in this one the cock is the victor rather than victim. There are also Eastern variants of this story.

== Versions of the fable ==
In the Greek story, a cock and a dog go on a journey together. At night, the cock roosts in a tree while the dog curls up at its roots. When the cock crowed in the morning, it attracted a fox that made friendly overtures and tried to lure the bird down. The cock agrees, telling it to ask the porter to open the door so that it can come out. The fox stumbles on the sleeping dog and is killed.

An ancient Indian variant of the theme appeared in the Buddhist scriptures as the Kukuta-Jataka. Here a predatory cat, having killed all the other fowls, tries to woo the cock down with a promise of marriage, but he is not to be deceived and denounces the cat for its former slaughter. In its journey westwards, the tale was eventually included in The Thousand and One Nights and was translated by Richard F. Burton as The Pleasant History of the Cock and the Fox. This version, enlarged by the fox's many flights of rhetoric, recounts how the beast tries to lure the cock down from a wall with the news that universal friendship has been declared between the hunters and the hunted. The cock refuses even to acknowledge the fox's fine words but finally announces that he is convinced for he can see greyhounds running towards them who must be messengers from the King of the Beasts. When the agitated fox starts to leave, the cock asks him the reason; the fox replies that he fears the dogs were not present when the peace was announced.

This version of the story was an influence on the fable's retelling in Europe. It is to be found early among the humorous tales of Poggio Bracciolini's Facetiae (1450), where the fleeing fox explains only that the dogs have not yet heard that peace has been declared. In France the story reappeared in the first book of emblems of Guillaume Gueroult (1550). There the fable is told at length and it is explained that the suspicious cock has invented his report of the approaching hounds because he distrusts the fox. The telling is prefaced with the summary of the fable's meaning: "To the trickster comes a trickster and a half" (A trompeur, trompeur et demi). When Jean de la Fontaine retold the story as Le coq et le renard (II.15), he underlined his use of Geroult by concluding with a moral that echoed his source: "Pleasure is doubled in tricking the trickster" (c'est double plaisir de tromper le trompeur).

The Greek and the Oriental versions of the fable were soon to be confounded together. In Francis Barlow's illustrated edition of the fables (1687), Aphra Behn's English verse summary tells the Eastern tale with the cock concluding that "I'le not my strength forgoe, If true today, tomorrow 'twill be so." The accompanying Latin prose summary, on the other hand, follows Aesop's account but concludes that treachery is to be met with treachery.

== Artistic interpretations ==
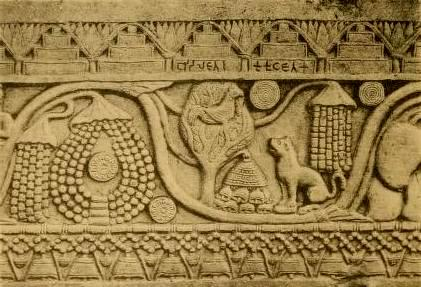
The Jataka story of the cock and the cat from the Bharhut stupa, 150 BCE

There is a carving of "The Cock and the Cat" from the Bharhut stupa, dating from 150 BCE, which is now displayed in the Indian Museum in Calcutta. Aesop's fable can be found on household china in Europe, but it is not always clear whether the story of "Chanticleer and the Fox" is meant instead without the appearance of the dog as well. The dog occupies the foreground on an 18th-century ornamental dessert dish from the Chelsea porcelain factory, while in Marc Chagall's 1952 series of etchings, which are of La Fontaine's fables, the dog is shown running in from the distance.

La Fontaine's version of the fable has also been set by several composers:

- Louis Lacombe, as the third in his Fables de La Fontaine (Op. 72 1875)
- Jean Françaix for solo or chorus and piano (1963)
- Guy Reibel for wind instrument and three equal voices (1996)
- Lucian Cristofor Tugui in 2006
