= The Cat and the Mice =

Aesop's fable

The Cat and the Mice is a fable attributed to Aesop of which there are several variants. Sometimes a weasel is the predator; the prey can also be rats and chickens.

== The Fables ==
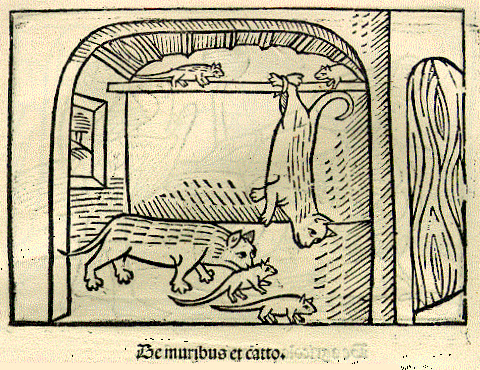
A print from a 1501 German edition of Aesop's fables in the Mannheim University

The Greek version of the fable recorded by Babrius concerns a cat that pretends to be a sack hanging from a peg in order to deceive the chickens, but his disguise is seen through by a rooster. This is numbered 79 in the Perry Index. William Caxton tells a very much amplified story of the rats that are the cat's victims. These hold a council and make the decision to stay off the floor and keep in the rafters. The cat then hangs himself from a hook and pretends to be dead, but the rats are not deceived. Later authors substituted mice for rats. The moral lesson taught by these stories is summed up by the English proverb 'Once bitten, twice shy'. The episode of the rats holding a council is similar to the fable of The Mice in Council who suggested hanging a bell on the cat, but that only developed during the Middle Ages and has a completely different moral.

The Phaedrus version of the fable is separately numbered 511 in the Perry Index and is prefaced by advice on the need to keep one's wits about one. It relates how, in order to catch mice, a weasel that has grown old rolls itself in flour and lies in a corner of the house until its prey approaches. A wily survivor spots its trick and addresses it from a distance. As well as Caxton, Roger L'Estrange also recorded both variants, but it did not survive much beyond his time.

Jean de la Fontaine incorporated the incidents of both into a single fable in Le Chat et un Vieux Rat (The cat and an old rat, III.18). The rats have become wary of showing themselves because of the cat, so it hangs itself upside down as if it were dead and waits for the rats to invade the larder. This can only work once, so its next trick is to hide in the bran tub and ambush its victims there. A wary senior saves himself by keeping aloof and taunts it by name. La Fontaine's version was reused by Robert Dodsley in his fable collection of 1764 and again in the 1884 English edition of Aesop's Fables: A New Revised Version from Original Sources. In the woodcut illustrating it, the cautious mouse is peering over a sack at the whitened hind-quarters of the cat on the opposite side of the barn.
