= Giovanni Maria Verdizotti =

Italian painter

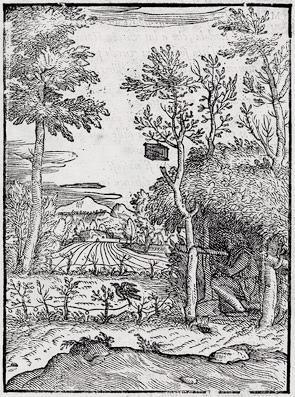
A woodcut of "The Birdcatcher and the Lark" from the 100 Moral Fables

Giovanni Maria Verdizotti was a well-connected writer and artist who was born in Venice in about 1525 and died there in 1600.

== Life and work ==
As an artist, Verdizotti is mainly remembered for his friendship with Titian, whose pupil he was, and later his secretary from 1556. No painted work can be attributed with certainty to him but, judging from the prints in his "100 Moral Fables" (Cento favole morali), his speciality was small landscapes with tiny figures. There is a signed pen and ink drawing by him of Cephalus and Procris (Brunswick, Herzog Anton Ulrich-Museum), which resembles Titian's graphic style. Other drawings attributed to Verdizotti are a pen and ink Landscape with Houses (Milan, Biblioteca Ambrosiana) and the Titian-like Study of a Tree (Madrid, Real Academia de Bellas Artes de San Fernando). He probably also executed the pen and wash drawing of "A Bear Devouring a Rabbit in a Landscape" (Florence, Uffizi), which has as motto naturam ars vincit, a work close in style to the woodcuts that illustrate his fables. Similarly, the supposed ink portrait of Titian (Haarlem, Teyler's Museum) is close to the "Cephalus and Procris".

Verdizotti's poetic work includes a translation into ottava rima of the second book of the Aeneid (1560) and a chivalric romance, Del L'Aspramonte (1594). His most celebrated work was the "100 Moral Fables", valued as much for the beauty of his woodprints as for the verse and the interesting choice of subjects. According to Ruth Mortimer, he was probably influenced by Gabriele Faerno's Centum Fabulae (1563), the engravings in which are considered as being by Titian and which Verdizotti may have seen in preparation. Among Verdizotti's fables, 37 of Faerno's subjects do not appear, the rejected texts dealing mainly with men and gods. His preference is for animal fables but he also added the Biblical "The Trees and the Bramble".

In 1597 Verdizotti published a prose "Lives of the Holy Fathers" (Vite de Santi Padri) in which he mentioned that he had a canonry at Castelcucco, near Treviso.

== Selected published works ==
- Il secondo libro dell' Eneida di Virgilio dove si contiene la distruttione dell' antichissimo imperio d'Asia (The second book of the Aeneid)
- Encomium Picturae (In praise of painting, 1569)
- Cento favole bellissime de i piu illustri antichi, e moderni autori Grece, e Latini (100 Fables, 1570)
- Genius sive de furore poetico (Genius or the poetic madness, 1575)
- XII sonetti nelle nozze de Francesco de Medici, gran duca di Thoscana (12 sonnets on the marriage of the Grand Duke of Tuscany, 1579)
- Del l'Aspramonte: poema heroico (1594)
- Le vite de Santi Padri (The lives of the Holy Fathers, 1597). The new edition of 1600 is corrected, emended and 'purged of infinite errors' (espurgate da infiniti errori)
