= Samuel Croxall =

English priest, writer and translator (c. 1688/9-1752)

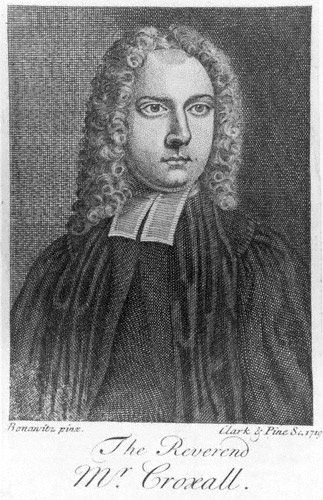
A contemporary print of Samuel Croxall

Samuel Croxall (c. 1688/9 – 13 February 1752) was an Anglican churchman, writer and translator, particularly noted for his edition of Aesop's Fables.

== Early career ==
Samuel Croxall was born in 1688 or 1689 at Walton on Thames, where his father (also called Samuel) was vicar and baptized on 4 february 1689 at the same town. He was educated at Eton and at St John's College, Cambridge, where he took his B.A. in 1711 and entered holy orders. Soon after graduating he began to emerge as a political pamphleteer, taking the Whig side on the question of the Hanoverian succession. In 1713 he published An original canto of Spencer: design'd as part of his Faerie Queene, but never printed, followed next year by Another original canto of Spencer. Croxall's satirical target was the Tory politician of the day, Robert Harley, Earl of Oxford, and the choice of poetical model was also politically motivated. In 1706 the Whig turncoat Matthew Prior had used the Spenserian stanza in An Ode, Humbly Inscrib'd to the Queen on the conduct of the War of the Spanish Succession; at the time of Croxall's poems, Prior was negotiating an unpopular peace on behalf of Harley and so the style he had adopted was being turned against him. This was further underlined by Croxall's next political poem, An ode humbly inscrib'd to the king, occasion'd by His Majesty's most auspicious succession and arrival, once more using the Spenserian stanza and published in 1715.

As a reward for his loyal services at a time of disputed succession, Croxall was made chaplain in ordinary to King George I for the Chapel Royal at Hampton Court. Later that year he preached before the king at St Paul's Cathedral on Incendiaries no Christians (on the text of John 13.35) and came into collision with the new Prime Minister, Robert Walpole. Gossip had it that Walpole had stood in the way to some ecclesiastical dignity which Croxall wished to obtain and found himself the object of veiled references to corrupt and wicked ministers of state in the sermon. Since Walpole was a vengeful man, 'it was expected that the doctor for the offence he had given would have been removed from his chaplainship, but the court over-ruled it, as he had always manifested himself to be a zealous friend to the Hanoverian succession'. Croxall continued his compliment to the king in his poem "A Vision", which places the new monarch within the context of the succession of kings and queens of England, presided over by the poets Geoffrey Chaucer and Edmund Spenser.

In 1717 Croxall married Philippa Proger, who had inherited her father's lands in Breconshire, including the family home of Gwern Vale; later he was to take up residence there from time to time. During his continued stay in London he moved in the circle of the Kit-Cat Club, a grouping of Whig politicians and writers. One of their joint literary projects was the translation of the 15 books of Ovid's Metamorphoses under the editorship of Samuel Garth. Among the other contributors were John Dryden, Joseph Addison, Arthur Mainwaring, Nicholas Rowe, John Gay and Laurence Eusden. Croxall's contribution was to translate the sixth book, three stories of the eighth book, one story of the tenth (the fable of Cyparissus), seven of the eleventh, and one of the thirteenth (the funeral of Memnon). As a translator of Ovid, he was still being talked of a century later in Leigh Hunt's reminiscences of Lord Byron. There he remarks of the arbitrary nature of the poet's tastes that 'It would have been impossible to persuade him that Sandys's Ovid was better than Addison's and Croxall's'.

During the following years Croxall was engaged in several literary ventures on his own account. In 1720 he edited A Select Collection of Novels written by the most celebrated authors in several languages. In its four volumes were eighteen complete or extracted works by such authors as Madame de la Fayette, Miguel de Cervantes, Nicolas Machiavelli, the Abbé de St. Réal, and Paul Scarron. So successful was this that he extended it to six volumes containing nine new works in 1722. Further editions under different titles followed into which some English works were also introduced. But Croxall was to achieve even greater success with his other work of 1722, The Fables of Aesop and Others, which were told in an easy colloquial style and followed by 'instructive applications'. Aimed at children, each fable was accompanied by illustrations which were soon to find their way onto household crockery and tiles. Several more editions were published in his lifetime and the book was continuously in print until well into the second half of the 19th century.

== Religious career ==
With royal patronage behind him, and having made judicious friendships in the Anglican hierarchy, Croxall began moving up the ecclesiastical ladder too. In 1727 he was made a prebendary of Hereford Cathedral and the following year he became a Doctor of Divinity. In 1732 he was made Archdeacon of Shropshire and in 1738 chancellor of Hereford. By this time Samuel's brother Rodney had followed him into the ministry and was living in Hereford. Samuel scandalised the citizens by demolishing an ancient chapel and using the stone to build Rodney a house.

His later publications were mainly religious. These include six of his sermons which comprise, as well as "Incendiaries no Christians": one preached in Lambeth Chapel at the consecration of the bishops of Hereford and of St. David's (1723); one preached before the Honourable House of Commons at St. Margaret's, Westminster on the anniversary of the beheading of Charles I (1729); and one on "The antiquity, dignity and advantages of music", delivered in the cathedral church of Hereford on the occasion of the Three Choirs Festival in 1741. He also wrote the voluminous Scripture Politics: Being a View of the Original Constitution, and Subsequent Revolutions, in the Government Religious and Civil, of that people out of whom the SAVIOUR of the WORLD was to arise, published in 1735 with "the design to make the Bible more easily understood". At the end of his life he brought out a final poem, "The Royal Manual" (1750), a moral prayer and meditation containing 22 sections of 16 lines each.

Croxall's anti-Catholic stance was part of the libertarian programme adopted by the Whig supporters of a Protestant succession and is manifested in a variety of ways. Unsurprisingly it is to be found in his political poetry, most notably in the portrait of the proud, triple-crowned Romania, the companion of the tyrannising Sir Burbon in stanzas 38-9 of the first Spenserian canto, and in the stanza devoted to the Roman Inquisition (12) in the second. Another unfavourable allusion to Catholic practice occurs in the second of his extracts from Ovid's Fasti where, following a reference to the naked priests of Faunus, Croxall departs from the original to observe that in place of outward observation of the naked truth, "modern Rome, to scour us all from sin,/ Appoints a prying Priest to peep within".

A more surprising context for the party line is in the preface to The Fables of Aesop. Here Croxall attacks the principles of interpretation of his immediate predecessor as fabulist, Sir Roger L'Estrange, as "coined and suited to promote the growth, and serve the ends, of Popery and arbitrary power....In every political touch he shows himself to be the tool and hirelling of the Popish faction". L'Estrange's versions are as lively and colloquial as Croxall's while his commentaries are shorter and, if anything, less political. In fact, the rival author's real crime was to be a supporter of the Stuart regime, for which at one time he acted as press censor.

== The Fair Circassian ==
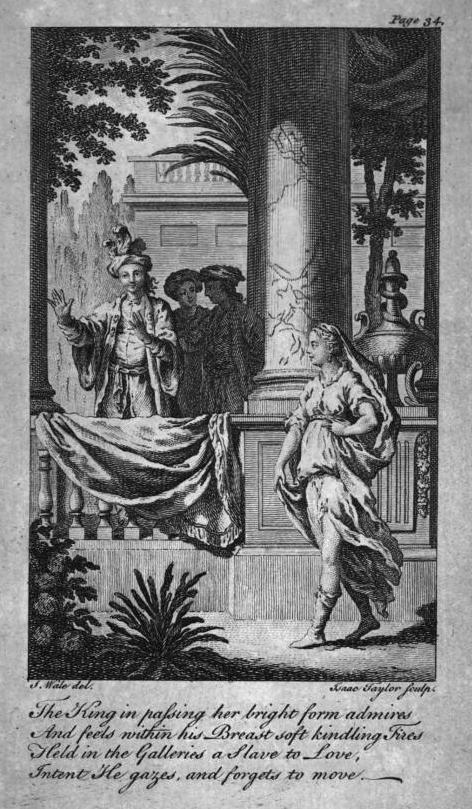
Isaac Taylor's illustration for The Fair Circassian, 1765

Extracts from the first and second books of Ovid's Fasti were included in what was the nearest thing to a Collected Poems that Croxall ever published, the later editions of The Fair Circassian, which contained a miscellany of other pieces. The reason why such learned fare appeared in the context of what are otherwise love poems is that both extracts deal with scenes of attempted rape described with bawdy relish:

He rose and silent as the steps of death,
On tiptoe stealing, held his breath:
Till he had crept within the blissful bow'r
That gave his utmost wishes to his pow'r.
The neighb'ring turf with tender care he prest;
Still lay the nymph, o'erwhelmed in downy rest:
O'erjoyed the god her vesture upward drew
And to the goal with furious vigour flew.
The nymph awaken'd, strove with all her might
To stop the eager dotard's fond delight,
And, rolling sideways from his hot embrace,
Scream'd out and fill'd with loud alarms the place.
The silver moon, just breaking from a cloud,
Show'd where the god in strange confusion stood,
Too well provided for the feats of love
And quite expos'd to all the laughing grove.

The voyeuristic character of this extract reappears elsewhere in the collection, especially in the account of a naked girl taking a midnight dip, "Florinda seen while she was bathing". Add to these the suggestive ambiguity of the metaphors in his love poems to Sylvia and it is not difficult to understand why the poems were so often reissued or the controversy stirred up by the title poem that they accompany.

The Fair Circassian: a dramatic performance was first published in 1720. An adaptation of the biblical Song of Solomon, it consists of eight short sections written in couplets in which King Solomon and an imaginary slave-girl called Saphira engage in amorous dialogue. Embarrassed by the existence of such sensuous writing in their holy book, it was declared clerical opinion that this inspired scripture was emblematic of relations between the Messiah and the Church. Many in the clergy therefore did not take kindly to having it treated as a love poem and accused the author of writing licentiously. James Craig, a Scottish minister from Edinburgh, denounced the work in a poem complaining of the prostitution of genius, of which he takes Croxall's poem as a particularly flagrant example:

Curss'd be he that the Circassian wrote,
Perish his fame, contempt be all his lot,
Who basely durst in execrable strains,
Turn holy mysteries into impious scenes.

— James Craig, Spiritual Life: Poems on several divine subjects, 1751

Knowing the risks to which his whole poetic output exposed him, Croxall took pains to conceal his authorship both by using pseudonyms and providing false information about the work's origin. As well as the transparent fiction that the satires on Harley are examples of ancient poetry, their discovery and editing are ascribed to Nestor Ironside. The Fair Circassian is supposedly the work of "A Gentleman Commoner of Oxford" who had lately died, one is led to believe in the preface, of love for one of the queen's maids of honour. Even his final poem, "The Royal Manual", of which any clergyman would not be ashamed, he endeavoured to pass off as discovered among the manuscripts of Andrew Marvell. Such was the notoriety of his poetical output and the power of his named literary productions, however, that it was impossible to keep their origin hidden for long.

== Influences ==
Croxall's poetry is largely the output of a single decade at the tail end of a period when writing (with astute dedications) was one avenue to political advancement. Contemporary judgements of his writing summed it up as such. His poetry only began to be reassessed at a period when critics turned their attention to examining contrary currents within the 'Augustan age'. In examining the poetry of the period for evidence of trends leading towards the Romantic movement, the scholar William Lyon Phelps groups such authors as Croxall, Lady Winchilsea and Allan Ramsay as 'currents flowing in a direction opposite to the general stream; individualities who were really out of sympathy with the Augustans, but who were overpowered by the prevailing fashion partly because the fashion was so strong, partly because no one of them had sufficient force publicly to throw off the shackles'. He goes on to comment of Croxall that "he seems to have been wholly out of sympathy with the spirit of the age, even consciously and defiantly so" (p. 28).

Phelps finds evidence for this judgement in Croxall's evident fascination with the poetry of Spenser, but Croxall was only one of several following the example of Prior's 1706 "Ode, Humbly Inscrib'd to the Queen". All that can be claimed for him is that his imitation is closer to the original and the ancestor of later works claiming to be new additions to the Faerie Queene. The only other poem manifesting some degree of originality is The Fair Circassian which Croxall describes in his preface as "a kind of opera or dramatic performance". The model he had in mind was Handel's recently performed and very successful pastoral opera Acis and Galatea, to a text written by the poets John Gay and (possibly) Alexander Pope. Written at a time when authors were looking round for novel applications of the outworn tradition of Classical Pastoral writing, Croxall's amorous eclogue with its exotic Eastern setting takes the tradition forward to the vogue set by William Collins' Oriental Eclogues (1742) and the considerable influence this had on the subject matter of the Romantic poets.
