= The Dove and the Ant =

Aesop's fable

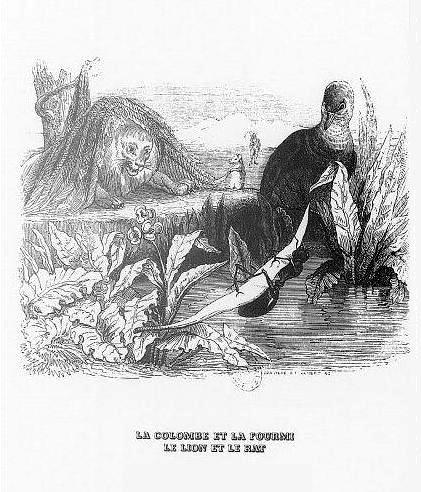
J. J. Grandville's plate of two fables with similar themes in La Fontaine's fables, 1838

The Dove and the Ant is a story about the reward of compassionate behaviour. Included among Aesop's Fables, it is numbered 235 in the Perry Index.

== The fable ==
There has been little variation in the fable since it was first recorded in Greek sources. An ant falls into a stream and a dove comes to the rescue by holding out a blade of grass to allow it to climb out. Then, noticing that a fowler was about to catch the dove, the ant bit his foot and his sudden movement caused the bird to fly away. In the Renaissance the Neo-Latin poets Hieronymus Osius and Pantaleon Candidus included it in their fable collections. In England it appeared early in William Caxton's collection of Aesop's fables and was later included in those of Francis Barlow and Samuel Croxall. It also appeared in Thomas Bewick's Select Fables, but was there told of a bee rather than an ant.

La Fontaine's Fables also include this story and underline the kinship between it and The Lion and the Mouse by running the two together under a common introduction:

To show to all your kindness it behoves
There's none so small but you his aid may need.
I quote two fables for this weighty creed
Which either of them fully proves.

The difference is that while the lion only showed compassion upon appeal, the dove does so out of pure good nature. The story also has details in common with The Fowler and the Snake. In both a bird is saved from being taken by a fowler by his being stung, although the aggressors have very different motives.

Other interpretations have been made of the fable. In a 1947 postcard series it is turned into a political statement in the aftermath of the occupation of France by the Nazis. There a little boy with a slingshot distracts a man with an armband labelled "Law" from chasing a girl who is running away with stolen apples in her pinafore. La Fontaine's fable was later set by Paul Bonneau among his 10 Fables de La Fontaine (1957) and Aesop's is the fourth of five pieces by Anthony Plog for narrator, piano and horn (1989/93). Later it also appeared among the three in Canadian Yvonne Gillespie's Aesop's Fables for narrator and full orchestra (2001).
