= The Statue of Hermes =

Ancient Greek fables of Hermes's statue

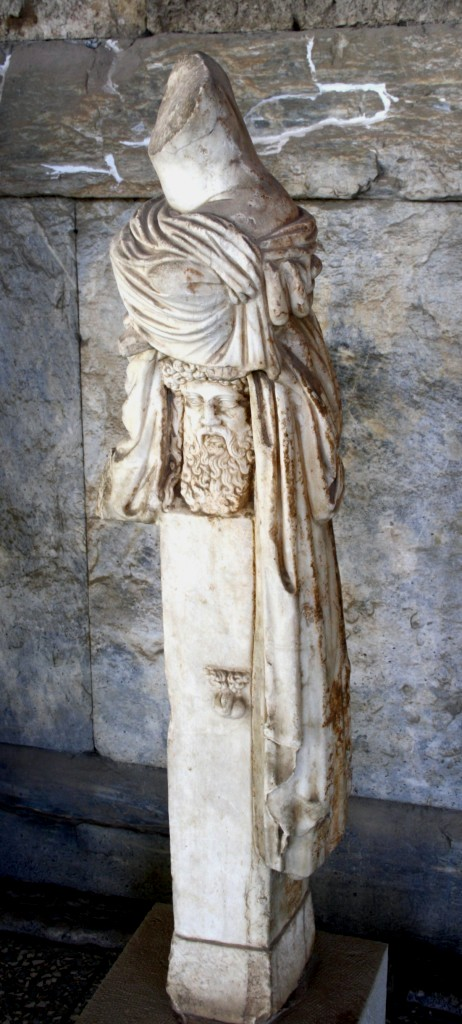
A Roman copy of a herm

There are five fables of ancient Greek origin that deal with the statue of Hermes. All have been classed as burlesques that show disrespect to the god Hermes and some skepticism concerning the efficacy of religious statues as objects of worship. Statues of Hermes differed according to function. Several are referenced in these stories. Only one fable became generally retold in later times, although two others also achieved some currency.

== Hermes and the sculptor ==
The fable appears as number 88 in the Perry Index and was to become a favourite in Europe from the Renaissance on. It is directed against self-conceit in general and concerns a visit to a statue maker made in human disguise by the god Hermes. Finding that Jove, the king of the gods, was set at a low price and his queen at only a little more, he felt sure that, since he was their messenger, his own statue must command much more. When he asked about it, however, the sculptor told him that if he would buy the other two statues he could have that one free.

A Neo-Latin poem on the theme appeared in Gabriele Faerno's Centum Fabulae (1563) with the moral that "Many who fancy themselves are set at nothing". In England prose versions appeared in the collections of Roger L'Estrange (1692) and Samuel Croxall (1722). In all of these, the name of the Greek god is changed to Mercury, his Latin equivalent. There were also two English verse retellings. In Edward Arwaker's Truth in Fiction (1708), the story is subtitled "Vain-glory mortified" and is a much more circumstantial account. Statues of the gods are described as currently "a drug on the market" to explain the low price asked and, in addition, the statue of Juno is cheaper since she is a woman. In 1820, Jefferys Taylor wrote a sprightly version for children in which the sculptor assures Mercury that his statue merely serves as a make-weight when a set of the gods is bought.

Illustrations of the tale, starting from the miniature in the Greek Medici Manuscript of about 1470, invariably feature the god pointing out his statue to the sculptor. An English copper engraving by David Jones for the specially commissioned Seven Fables of Aesop (1928) shows an up-to-date sculptor at work on the statue. The Australian linocut by John Ryrie is more sly in its updating. The god wears a collar, tie and smart overcoat as he enters into negotiation with the aproned workman. It is only the detail of sandals on his feet and the wings fluttering from beneath the trousers at his ankles that give his identity away.

== Hermes and the dog ==
The fable is numbered 308 in the Perry Index and is a broad piece of Greek scatalogical humour. There is a poetical version in the Greek of Babrius, but thereafter written accounts do not seem to continue. The Victorian translator of his work, Rev. John Davies, omitted it from his Fables of Babrius (1860), although the story is harmless enough. A dog of a pious turn of mind salutes the god's four-sided herma, a statue of the kind used to mark boundaries and stages along a road. When the animal announces its intention to anoint him, the god hastily begs it not to and says he does not need to be honoured any further.

== The sculptor's dream ==
The story is numbered 307 in the Perry Index and there are poetical versions in the Greek of Babrius and the Latin of Avianus, although the latter account is told of Bacchus. The type of statue involved in this case would be of the god as a handsome young man. Two customers approach the statuary, one wishing to place his work in the tomb of his son, one proposing to use it for private worship. Deciding to sleep on the matter, he is visited by Hermes in a dream and is told that he has in his hands the decision to make him either a dead man or a divinity. Although the fable is light-hearted, the 2nd century physician and philosopher, Galen, gave it a more serious turn by applying the story to human potentiality. In a work on ethics, he tells the fable and then continues by commenting that similarly "You have a choice between honouring your soul by making it like the gods and treating it contemptuously by making it like the brute beasts".

== The wish-fulfilling image ==
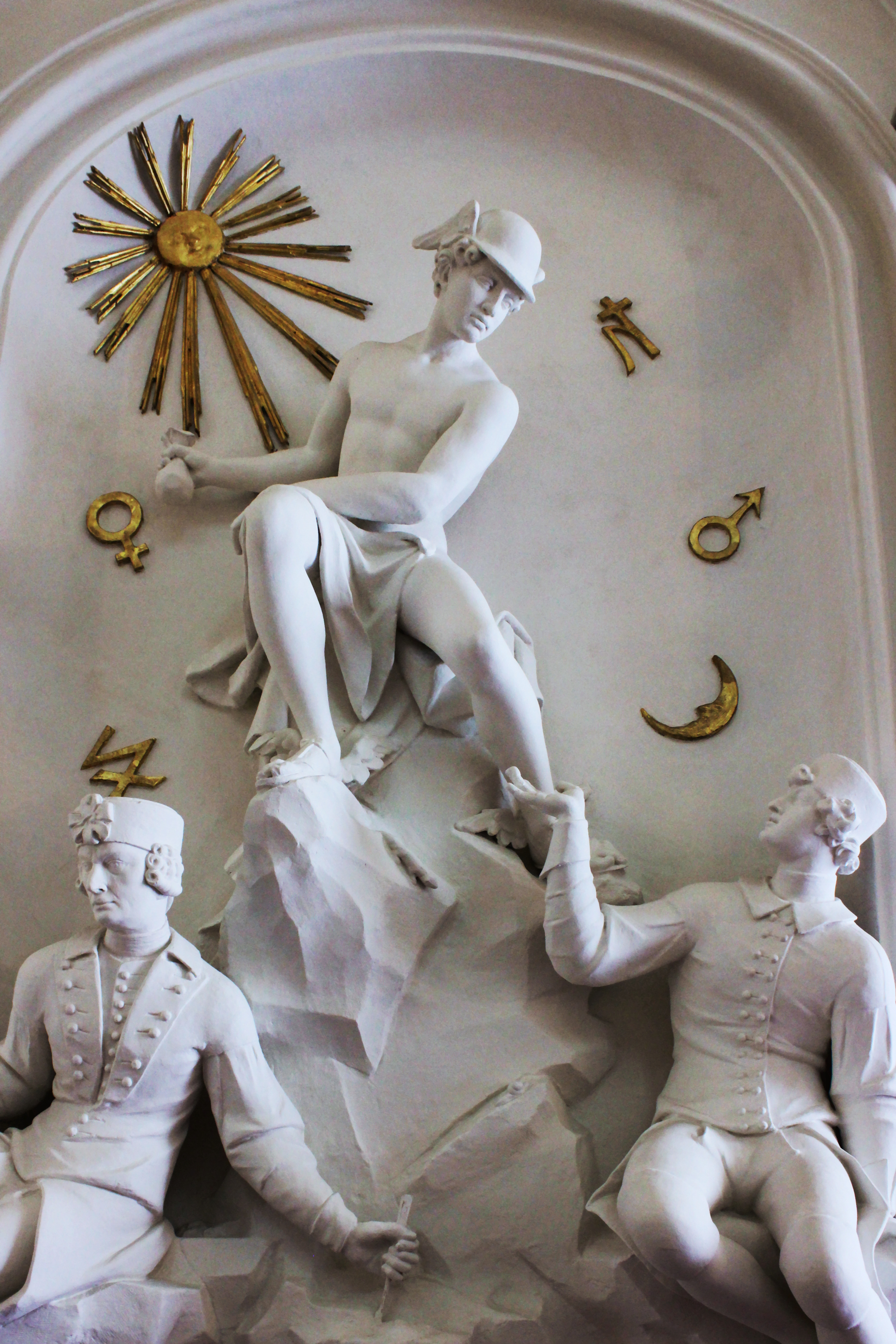
An 18th-century Viennese statue of Hermes the wealth-bringer

The fable numbered 99 in the Perry Index was not translated into English until it appeared in the substantial collection of Roger L'Estrange under the title "An image expos'd to sale".

A sculptor hawks his newly finished statue at market by declaring that this is a wonder-working god and will profit its owner. When asked why he is selling such a valuable asset, the sculptor replies that he is in need of immediate funds while Hermes takes his time in granting favours. Later English versions include "The Seller of Images" in George Fyler Townsend's Aesop's Fables (1867) and V.S. Vernon-Jones' new translation as "The Image Seller" in 1912.

== The statue and the treasure ==
The story is numbered 285 in the Perry Index and was versified in Greek by Babrius, drawing the moral that evil men will only comply when insulted. In this case, the wealth-bringing Hermes does not deliver the expected benefits and his frustrated worshipper smashes the image on the floor. When a flood of gold coins pours from the head, the man reproaches the kind of personality that will not render good for good but does so when ill-treated. While Babrius specifically named the god involved, Hieronymus Osius did not when he versified the fable in Latin, while Pantaleon Candidus specifically states that he does not know in his Latin poem, Homo et statua. Neither did William Caxton or Roger L'Estrange say who it is in their English prose versions, which end with reflections on misdirected worship. Jean de La Fontaine is equally reticent about the god's identity in his L'homme et son idole de bois ('The man and his wooden idol', Fables IV.8).

It has been surmised that one explanation for the scepticism of these last two fables was that Hermes was the god of trade and merchants and the Greeks had a certain ambivalence towards wealth making. The 10th century Byzantine Greek lexicon known as the Suda explains what form of statue is involved here. "They say Hermes was responsible for profit and an overseer of the businesses: consequently they set up the statue of him weighing a purse." It is to such sculptures that the statue on the stairs of the Winter Palace of Prince Eugene in Vienna can be referred, although it is itself ambiguous. The sculptor rests with chisel in hand on the statue's right as it looks down towards another similarly dressed individual on the other side who raises his hand towards the god. It might therefore remind viewers of the first of the fables here, which was well known. However, it is the purse held well away in the god's right hand which seems to be drawing the gaze of the man below, whose hand is cupped as if in supplication. The statue can therefore be read alternatively as referencing either of the last two fables here.
