= Woodcutter =

Woodcutter may refer to:

- A gatherer of firewood
- A lumberjack
- An artist producing woodcuts

== Fictional characters ==
- The children's father in Hansel and Gretel, a German fairy tale collected by the Brothers Grimm
- The title character in The Honest Woodcutter, one of Aesop's Fables
- A title character in The Tale of the Woodcutter and his Daughters, an Egyptian folktale
- A character in Tulisa, the Wood-Cutter's Daughter, an Indian folktale
- The title character in The Woodcutter and the Trees, a complex of fables of West Asian and Greek origin

== Other uses ==
- Secret Service code name for Henry Kissinger (1923-2023), American politician and diplomat

== See also ==
- Woodcutters, a 1984 German novel by Thomas Bernhard
