= The Rose and the Amaranth =

Fable by Aesop

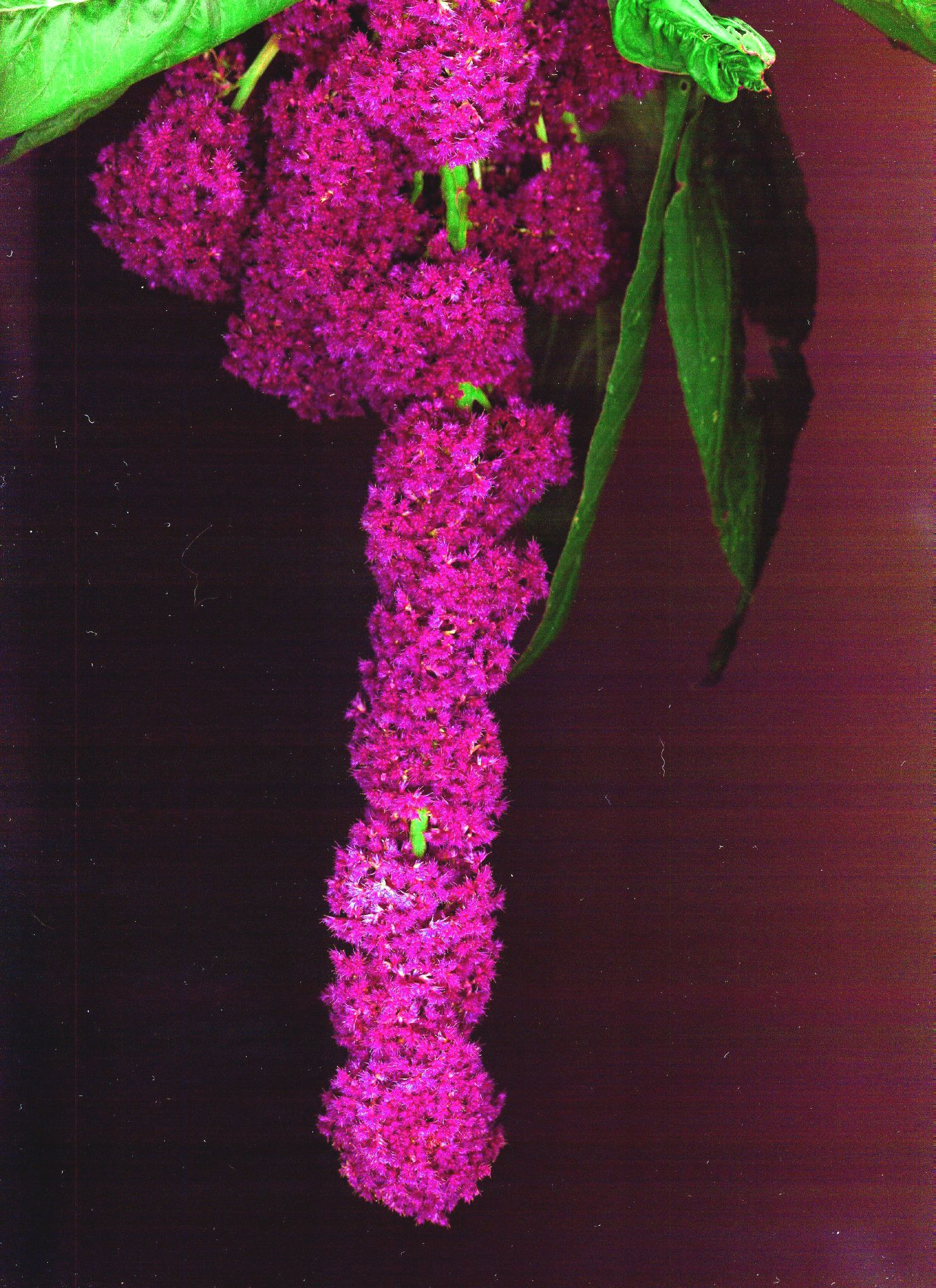
Amaranth flowers hanging down

The Rose and the Amaranth is one of Aesop's Fables, numbered 369 in the Perry Index. It stands in contrast to those plant fables like The Oak and the Reed and The Trees and the Bramble in which the protagonists arrogantly debate with each other. But in this story, the lowly amaranth praises the rose for its beauty and reputation and is answered, equally humbly, that a rose's life is brief while the amaranth (the name of which means literally 'the undying flower') is everlasting.

In Classical times there were only Greek versions of the story and it spread into Western Europe comparatively late. One of the first to give a version in English was Brook Boothby in a poem that concludes

Love is the rose-bud of an hour;
Friendship the everlasting flower.

The fable's moral is that beauty does not last, and that enviable conditions often have a downside.

An American musical illustration of the fable occurs as a section of Liz Nedela's Fables for Oboe and Piano.
