= The Man with Two Mistresses =

Fable by Aesop

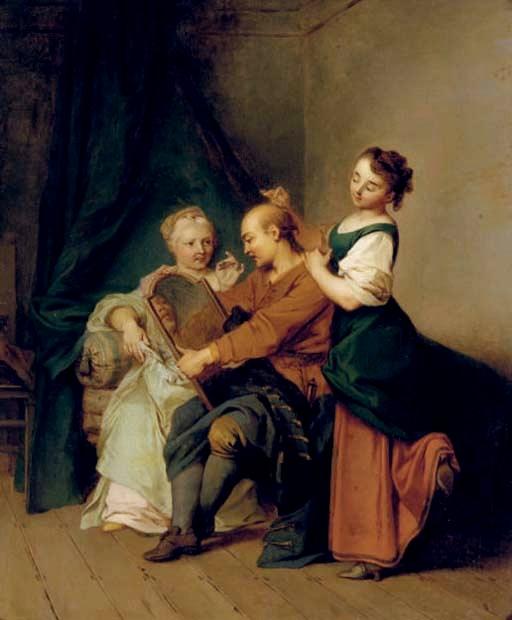
An 18th-century painting of the fable by Sébastien Leclerc the younger (1676–1763)

The Man with Two Mistresses is one of Aesop's Fables that deals directly with human foibles. It is numbered 31 in the Perry Index.

== The Fable ==
A middle-aged man had two mistresses, one of whom was older than him, and one younger. Under the pretence of dressing his hair, the younger plucked out his grey hairs so that he would look closer in age to her, while the older plucked out the dark hairs with the same motive. Between the two, he was left bald. Some later versions of the fable have translated the title as if the women were wives or even fiancées. However, Greek texts call them courtesans (ἑταίρας) or lovers (ἐρωμένας) and the Neo-Latin poet Pantaleon Candidus refers to them as concubines in his version.

Among the main sources of the fable, it is to be found in the Greek of Babrius and the Latin of Phaedrus, both of whom draw the moral that women are only out for what they can get from a man. Roger l'Estrange concludes that "'Tis a much harder Thing to please two Wives, than two Masters" in his version while in La Fontaine's Fables the disabused lover renounces both women on the grounds that they wish to make him conform to their standards rather than adapt themselves to him ("The man between two ages and two mistresses" I.17). Eschewing La Fontaine's pointed brevity, William Somervile adapted the Phaedrus account to a cautionary tale of inordinate length. Titled "The Bald Batchelor", it counsels the "batter'd Beau" to "marry in good time or not at all".

== Adaptations ==
At the start of the 18th century in Britain, the fable was given a political interpretation. Matthew Prior's "A Fable" (1710) was applied to the situation of the reigning monarch, caught between the two political parties of the day. The Scots poet Allan Ramsay adapted La Fontaine's fable into dialect as "The Man wi the Twa Wives" somewhere between 1722–29. In the wake of the widespread appropriation of fables to political ends in previous decades, he makes the two wives supporters of opposing parties in addition to hair-pluckers and draws the conclusion that truth is the victim of extreme opposing views. At the other end of that century, the fable was adapted by F. G. Waldron (1744–1818) as "The man with two wives or, wigs for ever! A dramatick fable set to musick by Mr. Sanderson". It was first performed at the then Royalty Theatre in Tower Hamlets on March 24, 1798, to such popular acclaim that copies of the piece soon appeared for sale there. The conclusion of this musical romp is that the trio finally order wigs 'from Britain' so that all may change the colour of their hair at will.

In 20th century France, Francis Poulenc included La Fontaine's plot as an episode in his ballet Les Animaux modèles (1941). Jean Françaix set it for voice, flute and string quintet in 1958. Howard J. Buss set it for alto sax and voice under the title of "The Middle Aged Man with Two Mistresses" in his suite of "Sonic Fables: Lessons from Aesop" (1991) and Vladimir Cosma made it the seventh piece in Eh bien ! Dansez maintenant (2006), a light-hearted interpretation for narrator and orchestra in the style of a Boston. The artist Leonor Fini also made a print of the fable in 1961.
