= Perry Index =

Index of Aesop's Fables

The Perry Index is an index of "Aesop's Fables" or "Aesopica", the fables credited to Aesop, the storyteller who lived in ancient Greece between 620 and 560 BC. The index was created by Ben Edwin Perry, a professor of classics at the University of Illinois Urbana-Champaign.

Modern scholarship takes the view that Aesop probably did not compose all of the fables attributed to him; indeed, a few are known to have first been used before Aesop lived, while the first record of many others is from well over a millennium after his time. Traditionally, Aesop's fables were arranged alphabetically, which is not helpful to the reader. Perry listed them by language (Greek then Latin), chronologically, by source, and then alphabetically; the Spanish scholar Francisco Rodríguez Adrados created a similar system. This system also does not help the casual reader, but is the best for scholarly purposes.

== Index ==
=== Perry 1–100 ===
- Perry 1. Eagle and Fox
- Perry 2. Eagle, Jackdaw and Shepherd
- Perry 3. Eagle and Beetle
- Perry 4. Hawk and Nightingale
- Perry 5. The Athenian Debtor
- Perry 6. The Goatherd and the Wild Goats
- Perry 7. Cat as Physician and the Hens
- Perry 8. Aesop at the Shipyard
- Perry 9. The Fox and the Goat in the Well
- Perry 10. Fox and Lion
- Perry 11. The Fisherman Pipes to the Fish
- Perry 12. Fox and Leopard
- Perry 13. The Fisherman
- Perry 14. The Ape boasting to the Fox about his Ancestry
- Perry 15. The Fox and the Grapes out of Reach
- Perry 16. The Cat and the Cock
- Perry 17. The Fox without a Tail
- Perry 18. The Fisherman and the Little Fish
- Perry 19. The Fox and the Thornbush
- Perry 20. Fox and Crocodile
- Perry 21. The Fishermen and the Tunny
- Perry 22. The Fox and the Woodcutter
- Perry 23. Cocks and Partridge
- Perry 24. The Fox with the Swollen Belly
- Perry 25. The Halcyon
- Perry 26. A Fisherman
- Perry 27. The Fox looks at the Actor's Mask
- Perry 28. The Cheater
- Perry 29. The Fuller and the Charcoal Burner
- Perry 30. The Shipwrecked Man (referenced under Hercules and the Wagoner)
- Perry 31. The Middle-aged Man and his Two Mistresses
- Perry 32. The Murderer
- Perry 33. The Braggart
- Perry 34. Impossible Promises
- Perry 35. The Man and the Satyr
- Perry 36. Evil-wit
- Perry 37. A Blind Man
- Perry 38. The Ploughman and the Wolf
- Perry 39. The Wise Swallow
- Perry 40. The Astrologer who Fell into a Well
- Perry 41. Fox and Lamb
- Perry 42. The Farmer's Bequest to his Sons
- Perry 43. Two Frogs
- Perry 44. The Frogs ask Zeus for a King
- Perry 45. The Oxen and the Squeaking-Axle
- Perry 46. The North Wind and the Sun
- Perry 47. The Boy with the Stomach-Ache
- Perry 48. The Nightingale and the Bat
- Perry 49. The Herdsman who lost a Calf
- Perry 50. The Weasel and Aphrodite
- Perry 51. The Farmer and the Snake
- Perry 52. The Farmer and his Dogs
- Perry 53. The Farmer's Sons
- Perry 54. The Snails in the Fire
- Perry 55. The Woman and her Overworked Maidservants
- Perry 56. The Witch
- Perry 57. The Old Woman and the Thieving Physician
- Perry 58. The Overfed Hen (referenced under The Goose that Laid the Golden Eggs)
- Perry 59. Weasel and File
- Perry 60. The Old Man and Death
- Perry 61. Fortune and the Farmer
- Perry 62. The Dolphins at War and the Gudgeon (or Crab)
- Perry 63. Demades the Orator
- Perry 64. The Wrong Remedy for Dog-bite
- Perry 65. The Travellers and the Bear
- Perry 66. The Youngsters in the Butcher's Shop
- Perry 67. The Wayfarers who Found an Axe
- Perry 68. The Enemies
- Perry 69. Two Frogs were Neighbours
- Perry 70. The Oak and the Reed
- Perry 71. The Timid and Covetous Man who found a Lion made of Gold
- Perry 72. The Beekeeper
- Perry 73. The Ape and the Dolphin
- Perry 74. The Stag at the Fountain
- Perry 75. The One-eyed Stag
- Perry 76. The Stag and the Lion in a Cave
- Perry 77. The Stag and the Vine
- Perry 78. The Passengers at Sea
- Perry 79. Cat and Mice
- Perry 80. The Flies in the Honey
- Perry 81. The Ape and the Fox
- Perry 82. Ass, Cock, and Lion
- Perry 83. The Ape and the Camel
- Perry 84. The Two Beetles
- Perry 85. The Pig and the Sheep
- Perry 86. The Thrush
- Perry 87. The Goose that Laid the Golden Eggs
- Perry 88. Hermes and the Statuary
- Perry 89. Hermes and Tiresias
- Perry 90. Viper and Watersnake
- Perry 91. The Ass who would be Playmate to his Master
- Perry 92. The Two Dogs
- Perry 93. The Viper and the File
- Perry 94. The Father and his Two Daughters
- Perry 95. The Ill-tempered Wife
- Perry 96. Viper and Fox
- Perry 97. The Young Goat and the Wolf as Musicians
- Perry 98. The Kid on the House-top and the Wolf
- Perry 99. A Statue of Hermes on Sale
- Perry 100. Zeus, Prometheus, Athena and Momus

=== Perry 101–200 ===
- Perry 101. The Jackdaw in Borrowed Feathers
- Perry 102. Hermes and Earth
- Perry 103. Hermes and the Artisans
- Perry 104. Zeus and Apollo, a Contest in Archery
- Perry 105. Man's Years
- Perry 106. Zeus and the Tortoise
- Perry 107. Zeus and the Fox
- Perry 108. Zeus and Man
- Perry 109. Zeus and Shame
- Perry 110. The Hero
- Perry 111. Heracles and Plutus
- Perry 112. Ant and Beetle
- Perry 113. The Tunny and the Dolphin
- Perry 114. The Physician at the Funeral
- Perry 115. The Fowler and the Asp
- Perry 116. The Crab and the Fox
- Perry 117. The Camel who wanted Horns
- Perry 118. The Beaver
- Perry 119. The Gardener watering his Vegetables
- Perry 120. The Gardener and his Dog
- Perry 121. The Cithara Player
- Perry 122. The Thieves and the Cock
- Perry 123. The Jackdaw and the Crows
- Perry 124. Fox and Crow
- Perry 125. The Crow and the Raven
- Perry 126. Jackdaw and Fox
- Perry 127. The Crow and the Dog
- Perry 128. The Crow and the Snake
- Perry 129. The Jackdaw and the Pigeons
- Perry 130. The Stomach and the Feet
- Perry 131. The Jackdaw fleeing from Captivity
- Perry 132. The Dog who would chase a Lion
- Perry 133. The Dog with the Meat and his Shadow
- Perry 134. The Sleeping Dog and the Wolf
- Perry 135. The Famished Dogs
- Perry 136. The Dog and the Hare
- Perry 137. The Gnat and the Bull
- Perry 138. The Hares and the Frogs
- Perry 139. The Sea-gull and the Kite
- Perry 140. The Lion in Love
- Perry 141. The Lion and the Frog
- Perry 142. The Aged Lion and the Fox
- Perry 143. The Lion and the Bull invited to Dinner
- Perry 144. The Lion in the Farmer's Yard
- Perry 145. Lion and Dolphin
- Perry 146. The Lion startled by a Mouse
- Perry 147. Lion and Bear
- Perry 148. The Lion and the Hare
- Perry 149. The Lion, Ass, and Fox
- Perry 150. The Lion and the Mouse
- Perry 151. The Lion and the Ass Hunting
- Perry 152. The Brigand and the Mulberry Tree
- Perry 153. The Wolves and the Sheep
- Perry 154. The Wolf and the Horse
- Perry 155. The Wolf and the Lamb
- Perry 156. The Wolf and the Heron
- Perry 157. The Wolf and the Goat
- Perry 158. The Wolf and the Old Woman Nurse
- Perry 159. Wolf and Sheep (Three True Statements)
- Perry 160. The Disabled Wolf and the Sheep
- Perry 161. The Fortune-teller
- Perry 162. The Baby and the Crow
- Perry 163. Zeus and the Bees
- Perry 164. The Mendicant Priests
- Perry 165. Battle of the Mice and Cats
- Perry 166. The Ant (noticed under The Ant and the Grasshopper)
- Perry 167. The Fly
- Perry 168. The Shipwrecked Man
- Perry 169. The Prodigal Young Man and the Swallow
- Perry 170. Physician and Sick Man
- Perry 171. Bat, Thorn Bush, and Gull
- Perry 172. The Bat and the Two Weasels
- Perry 173. Hermes and the Woodcutter
- Perry 174. Fortune and the Traveller by the Well
- Perry 175. The Travellers and the Plane Tree
- Perry 176. The Man who warmed a Snake
- Perry 177. The Driftwood on the Sea
- Perry 178. The Traveller's Offering to Hermes
- Perry 179. The Ass and Gardener
- Perry 180. The Ass with a Burden of Salt
- Perry 181. The Ass and the Mule
- Perry 182. The Ass carrying the Image of a God
- Perry 183. The Wild Ass and the Tame Ass (noticed under The Dog and the Wolf)
- Perry 184. The Ass and the Cicadas
- Perry 185. The Donkeys make a Petition to Zeus
- Perry 186. The Ass and his Driver
- Perry 187. The Wolf as Physician
- Perry 188. Ass in Lion's Skin
- Perry 189. The Ass and the Frogs
- Perry 190. Ass, Crow, and Wolf
- Perry 191. The Fox betrays the Ass
- Perry 192. The Hen and the Swallow
- Perry 193. The Fowler and the Lark
- Perry 194. The Fowler and the Stork
- Perry 195. The Camel seen for the First Time (noticed under The Lion and the Fox)
- Perry 196. The Snake and the Crab
- Perry 197. Snake, Weasel and Mice
- Perry 198. Zeus and the Downtrodden Snake
- Perry 199. The Boy and the Scorpion
- Perry 200. The Thief and his Mother

=== Perry 201–300 ===
- Perry 201. The Pigeon and the Picture
- Perry 202. The Pigeon and the Crow
- Perry 203. The Ape and the Fisherman
- Perry 204. The Rich Man and the Tanner
- Perry 205. The Hired Mourners
- Perry 206. Shepherd and Dog
- Perry 207. The Shepherd and the Sea
- Perry 208. The Shepherd and his Sheep
- Perry 209. The Shepherd and the Young Wolves
- Perry 210. The Shepherd who cried "Wolf!" in Jest
- Perry 211. The Boy bathing in the River
- Perry 212. The Sheep unskillfully Sheared
- Perry 213. Pomegranate, Apple Tree, and Bramble
- Perry 214. The Mole
- Perry 215. The Wasps and the Partridges
- Perry 216. The Wasp and the Snake
- Perry 217. The Bull and the Wild Goats
- Perry 218. The Ape's Twin Offspring
- Perry 219. The Peacock and the Jackdaw
- Perry 220. Camel and Elephant, Candidates for King
- Perry 221. Zeus and the Snake
- Perry 222. The Sow and the Bitch
- Perry 223. A Dispute concerning Fecundity
- Perry 224. The Wild Boar and the Fox
- Perry 225. The Miser and his Gold
- Perry 226. The Tortoise and the Hare
- Perry 227. The Swallow nesting on the Courthouse
- Perry 228. The Geese and the Cranes
- Perry 229. The Swallow and the Crow
- Perry 230. The Turtle takes Lessons from the Eagle
- Perry 231. The Athlete and the Flea
- Perry 232. The Foxes at the Meander River
- Perry 233. The Swan and his Owner (Referenced under The Swan and the Goose)
- Perry 234. The Wolf and the Shepherd (Referenced under The Wolf in Sheep's Clothing)
- Perry 235. The Ant and the Dove
- Perry 236. The Travellers and the Crow
- Perry 237. A Donkey Bought on Approval
- Perry 238. The Fowler and the Pigeons
- Perry 239. The Depositary and the god Horkos (Oath)
- Perry 240. Prometheus and Men
- Perry 241. Cicada and Fox
- Perry 242. The Hyena and the Fox
- Perry 243. The Hyenas
- Perry 244. The Parrot and the Cat (Partridge and Cat)
- Perry 245. The Timid Soldier and the Crows
- Perry 246. The Wife and her Drunken Husband
- Perry 247. Diogenes on a Journey
- Perry 248. Diogenes and the Bald Man
- Perry 249. The Dancing Camel
- Perry 250. The Nut Tree
- Perry 251. The Lark
- Perry 252. The Dog, the Rooster, and the Fox
- Perry 253. Dog and Shellfish
- Perry 254. Dog and Butcher
- Perry 255. Mosquito and Lion
- Perry 256. Hares and Foxes
- Perry 257. Lioness and Fox
- Perry 258. The Sick Lion, the Wolf, and Fox
- Perry 259. The Lion, Prometheus, and the Elephant
- Perry 260. The Wolf admiring his Shadow
- Perry 261. The Wolf and the Lamb
- Perry 262. The Trees and the Olive
- Perry 263. The Ass and the Mule
- Perry 264. The Ass and his Fellow Traveller the Dog
- Perry 265. The Fowler and the Partridge
- Perry 266. The Two Wallets
- Perry 267. The Shepherd and the Wolf that he brought up with his Dogs (Referenced under The Wolf in Sheep's Clothing)
- Perry 268. The Caterpillar and the Snake (Referenced under The Frog and the Ox)
- Perry 269. The Wild Boar, the Horse, and the Hunter
- Perry 270. The Wall and the Stake
- Perry 271. Winter and Spring
- Perry 272. Man and Flea
- Perry 273. The Flea and the Ox
- Perry 274. Good Things and Evil
- Perry 275. The Eagle who had his Wings Cropped
- Perry 276. The Eagle Wounded by an Arrow
- Perry 277. The Nightingale and the Swallow
- Perry 278. The Athenian and the Theban
- Perry 279. The Goat and the Ass
- Perry 280. Goat and Goatherd
- Perry 281. The Fighting Cocks
- Perry 282. Little Fish escape the Net
- Perry 283. The Fire-Bearing Fox
- Perry 284. The Man and the Lion travelling together
- Perry 285. The Man who broke a Statue of Hermes
- Perry 286. Spider and Lizard
- Perry 287. The Arab and his Camel
- Perry 288. The Bear and the Fox
- Perry 289. The Frog Physician
- Perry 290. The Oxen and the Butchers
- Perry 291. The Ox-driver and Heracles
- Perry 292. Ox and Ass Ploughing
- Perry 293. The Weasel Caught
- Perry 294. The Crane and the Peacock
- Perry 295. The Farmer who lost his Mattock
- Perry 296. The Farmer and the Eagle
- Perry 297. Farmer and Cranes
- Perry 298. Farmer and Starlings
- Perry 299. The Farmer and the Tree
- Perry 300. The Steer and the Bull

=== Perry 301–400 ===
- Perry 301. The Slave Girl and Aphrodite
- Perry 302. The Oak Trees and Zeus - noticed under The Woodcutter and the Trees
- Perry 303. The Woodcutters and the Pine
- Perry 304. The Fir Tree and the Thistle
- Perry 305. The Sick Stag and his Friends
- Perry 306. Hermes and a Man bitten by an Ant
- Perry 307. Hermes and the Sculptor
- Perry 308. The Dog and the Square-hewn Statue of Hermes
- Perry 309. Hermes with a Wagon full of Lies among the Arabs
- Perry 310. The Eunuch and the Soothsayer
- Perry 311. Zeus, the Animals, and Men
- Perry 312. Zeus and the Jar full of Good Things
- Perry 313. The Judgments of Zeus
- Perry 314. The Frogs and the Sun
- Perry 315. The Mule
- Perry 316. Heracles and Athena
- Perry 317. The Unskilled Physician
- Perry 318. The Old Race Horse in the Mill
- Perry 319. The Horse and his Groom
- Perry 320. The Soldier and his Horse
- Perry 321. The Camel in the River
- Perry 322. The Crab and his Mother (noticed under The Snake and the Crab)
- Perry 323. The Crow and Hermes
- Perry 324. The Sick Crow and his Mother
- Perry 325. The Lark and the Farmer
- Perry 326. The Timid Hunter
- Perry 327. The Hunter and the Fisherman
- Perry 328. The Dog at the Banquet
- Perry 329. The Hunting Dog
- Perry 330. The Dog and his Master
- Perry 331. Dog and Hare
- Perry 332. The Dog with a Bell on his Neck
- Perry 333. The Rabbit and the Fox
- Perry 334. The Lion's Reign
- Perry 335. The Lion and the Eagle
- Perry 336. Sick Lion, Fox, and Stag, referenced in The Deer without a Heart
- Perry 337. Lion, Fox, and Ape
- Perry 338. The Lion and the Boar
- Perry 339. Lion and Wild Ass, Partners in the Hunt
- Perry 340. The Lion and the Bowman
- Perry 341. The Mad Lion
- Perry 342. The Wolves and the Dogs
- Perry 343. The Wolves and the Dogs at War
- Perry 344. A Wolf among the Lions
- Perry 345. The Wolf and the Fox at a Trap
- Perry 346. The Wolf and the Well-fed Dog
- Perry 347. Wolf and Lion
- Perry 348. The Wolf as Governor and the Ass
- Perry 349. The Lamp
- Perry 350. Adulterer and Husband
- Perry 351. The Calf and the Deer
- Perry 352. The Country Mouse and the City Mouse
- Perry 353. The Mouse and the Bull
- Perry 354. The Mouse and the Blacksmiths
- Perry 355. The Wayfarer and Truth
- Perry 356. The Sheep and the Dog
- Perry 357. The Ass that envied the Horse
- Perry 358. The Ass in the Lion's Skin
- Perry 359. The Donkey on the Tiles
- Perry 360. The Ass eating Thorns
- Perry 361. The Fowler, the Partridge and the Cock
- Perry 362. The Snake's Tail and the Other Members
- Perry 363. The Boy and the Painted Lion
- Perry 364. The Ape Mother and Zeus
- Perry 365. The Shepherd about to enclose a Wolf in the Fold
- Perry 366. The Shepherd who reared a Wolf
- Perry 367. War and Insolence
- Perry 368. The Hide in the River
- Perry 369. The Rose and the Amaranth
- Perry 370. The Trumpeter
- Perry 371. The Lizard and the Snake (Referenced under The Frog and the Ox)
- Perry 372. Three Bulls and a Lion
- Perry 373. The Cicada and the Ant
- Perry 374. The Goat and the Vine
- Perry 375. The Baldheaded Horseman
- Perry 376. The Toad puffing herself up to equal an Ox
- Perry 377. The Boasting Swallow and the Crow
- Perry 378. The Two Pots
- Perry 379. The Man enamoured of his own Daughter
- Perry 380. The Man who evacuated his own Wits
- Perry 381. The Aged Farmer and the Donkeys
- Perry 382. The Ancestors of the Delphians
- Perry 383. The Two Roads
- Perry 384. The Frog and the Mouse
- Perry 385. Dreams
- Perry 386. The Foolish Girl
- Perry 387. The Poor Man catching Insects
- Perry 388. The Widow and the Ploughman
- Perry 389. The Cat's Birthday Dinner
- Perry 390. The Crow and the Pitcher
- Perry 391. The Landlord and the Sailors
- Perry 392. The Sick Donkey and the Wolf Physician
- Perry 393. The Aethiopian
- Perry 394. The Fox as Helper to the Lion
- Perry 395. The Serpent and the Eagle
- Perry 396. The Kites and the Swans
- Perry 397. The Fowler and the Cicada
- Perry 398. The Crow and the Swan (noticed under Washing the Ethiopian white)
- Perry 399. The Swan that was caught instead of a Goose
- Perry 400. The Bees and the Shepherd

=== Perry 401–500 ===
- Perry 401. The Foal
- Perry 402. The Hunter and the Horseman
- Perry 403. The Hunter and the Dog
- Perry 404. Hunter and Wolf
- Perry 405. Cyclops
- Perry 406. Dogs tearing a Lion's Skin
- Perry 407. A Dog, chasing a Wolf
- Perry 408. A Thirsty Rabbit descended into a Well
- Perry 409. The Fox and the Lion in a Cage
- Perry 410. The Youth and the Woman
- Perry 411. The Onager and the Ass (noticed under The Dog and the Wolf)
- Perry 412. The Rivers and the Sea
- Perry 413. The Fig and the Olive
- Perry 414. The Bull, Lioness, and the Wild Boar
- Perry 415. The Dog and the Smiths
- Perry 416. A Bear, a Fox, and a Lion hunted together
- Perry 417. A Wolf and Lycophron
- Perry 418. The Ostrich
- Perry 419. The Thief and the Innkeeper
- Perry 420. The Two Adulterers
- Perry 421. The Sailor and his Son
- Perry 422. The Eagle once a Man
- Perry 423. Aesop and the Bitch
- Perry 424. Aesop to the Corinthians
- Perry 425. The Fisherman and the Octopus
- Perry 426. Fox and Crane
- Perry 427. Fox and Hedgehog
- Perry 428. The Sybarite and the Chariot
- Perry 429. The Man who tried to count the Waves
- Perry 430. The Creation of Man
- Perry 431. Man's Loquacity
- Perry 432. Apollo, the Muses and the Dryads
- Perry 433. Aphrodite and the Merchant
- Perry 434. The Wren on the Eagle's Back
- Perry 435. The Black Cat
- Perry 436. The Priest of Cybele and the Lion
- Perry 437. The Owl and the Birds
- Perry 438. The Sybarite Woman and the Jug
- Perry 439. The Laurel and the Olive
- Perry 440. The Runaway Slave
- Perry 441. The Feast Day and the Day After
- Perry 442. The Origin of Blushes
- Perry 443. Heron and Buzzard
- Perry 444. Eros among Men
- Perry 445. Pleasure and Pain
- Perry 446. The Cuckoo and the Little Birds
- Perry 447. The Crested Lark, burying her Father
- Perry 448. The Musical Dogs
- Perry 449. The Dog's House
- Perry 450. The Lions and the Hares
- Perry 451. The Wolf in Sheep's Clothing
- Perry 452. The Wolf and the Ass on Trial
- Perry 453. The Wolf and the Shepherds
- Perry 454. The Mouse and the Oyster
- Perry 455. Momus and Aphrodite
- Perry 456. The Fool and the Sieve
- Perry 457. The Boy on the Wild Horse
- Perry 458. The Ass and the Snake called Dipsas
- Perry 459. The Peeping of an Ass
- Perry 460. The Shadow of an Ass
- Perry 461. The Eyes and the Mouth
- Perry 462. The Privilege of Grief
- Perry 463. The Dancing Apes
- Perry 464. The Apes Founding a City
- Perry 465. The Shepherd and the Butcher
- Perry 466. Plenty and Poverty
- Perry 467. The Satyr and Fire
- Perry 468. The Moon and her Mother
- Perry 469. The Bull deceived by the Lion
- Perry 470. The Cicadas
- Perry 471. The Lice and the Farmer
- Perry 472. The Vainglorious Jackdaw and the Peacock
- Perry 473. The Sparrow gives Advice to the Hare
- Perry 474. The Wolf and the Fox before Judge Ape
- Perry 475. From Cobbler to Physician
- Perry 476. What the Ass said to the Old Shepherd
- Perry 477. Sheep, Stag, and Wolf
- Perry 478. Sheep, Dog, and Wolf
- Perry 479. Woman in Childbirth
- Perry 480. Dog and her Puppies
- Perry 481. The Old Lion, the Boar, the Bull, and the Ass
- Perry 482. The Dogs and the Crocodiles
- Perry 483. The Dog, the Treasure and the Vulture
- Perry 484. The Ass insults the Boar
- Perry 485. The Frogs Dread the Battle of the Bulls
- Perry 486. The Kite and the Doves
- Perry 487. The Bullock, the Lion, and the Robber
- Perry 488. The Eagle, the Cat, and the Wild Sow
- Perry 489. Caesar to a Flunkey
- Perry 490. The Eagle and the Crow
- Perry 491. The Two Mules and the Robbers
- Perry 492. The Stag and the Oxen
- Perry 493. What the Old Woman said to the Wine Jar
- Perry 494. The Panther and the Shepherds
- Perry 495. Aesop and the Farmer
- Perry 496. The Butcher and the Ape
- Perry 497. Aesop and the Saucy Fellow
- Perry 498. The Fly and the Mule
- Perry 499. Brother and Sister
- Perry 500. Socrates to his Friends

=== Perry 501–584 ===
- Perry 501. On Believing and Not Believing
- Perry 502. The Eunuch's Reply to the Scurrilous Person
- Perry 503. The Cockerel and the Pearl
- Perry 504. The Bees and the Drones get Judgment from the Wasp
- Perry 505. Concerning Relaxation and Tension
- Perry 506. The Dog to the Lamb
- Perry 507. The Cicada and the Owl
- Perry 508. Trees under the Patronage of the Gods
- Perry 509. The Peacock complains to Juno about his Voice
- Perry 510. Aesop's Reply to an Inquisitive Fellow
- Perry 511. The Weasel and the Mice—noticed under The Cat and the Mice
- Perry 512. The Enigmatic Will
- Perry 513. The Thief and his Lamp
- Perry 514. The Rule of King Lion
- Perry 515. Prometheus
- Perry 516. The Bearded She-Goats
- Perry 517. The Dogs send an Embassy to Jupiter
- Perry 518. The Fox and the Dragon
- Perry 519. About Simonides
- Perry 520. The Mountain in Labour
- Perry 521. The Ant and the Fly
- Perry 522. How Simonides was saved by the Gods
- Perry 523. King Demetrius and the Poet Menander
- Perry 524. Two Soldiers and a Robber
- Perry 525. The Bald Man and the Fly
- Perry 526. The Ass and the Pig's Barley
- Perry 527. The Buffoon and the Country Fellow
- Perry 528. Two Bald Men
- Perry 529. Prince, the Fluteplayer
- Perry 530. Time (Opportunity)
- Perry 531. The Bull and the Calf
- Perry 532. The Old Dog and the Hunter
- Perry 533. The Ape and the Fox
- Perry 534. Mercury and the Two Women
- Perry 535. Prometheus and Guile
- Perry 536. On Apollo's Oracle
- Perry 537. Aesop and the Writer
- Perry 538. Pompey and his Soldier
- Perry 539. Juno, Venus, and the Hen
- Perry 540. The Bullock and the Old Ox
- Perry 541. Aesop and the Victorious Athlete
- Perry 542. The Ass and the Lyre
- Perry 543. The Widow and the Soldier
- Perry 544. The Two Suitors
- Perry 545. Aesop and his Mistress
- Perry 546. The Cock carried in a litter by Cats
- Perry 547. The Sow giving birth and the Wolf
- Perry 548. Aesop and the Runaway Slave
- Perry 549. The Race Horse
- Perry 550. When the Bear gets Hungry
- Perry 551. The Traveller and the Raven
- Perry 552. The Snake and the Lizard
- Perry 553. The Crow and the Sheep
- Perry 554. Socrates and a Worthless Servant
- Perry 555. The Harlot and the Young Man
- Perry 556. The Butterfly and the Wasp
- Perry 557. The Ground-Swallow and the Fox
- Perry 558. Two Cocks and a Hawk
- Perry 559. The Snail and the Mirror
- Perry 560. The Bald Man and the Gardener
- Perry 561. The Owl, the Cat, and the Mouse
- Perry 562. The Partridge and the Fox (The Rooster and the Fox)
- Perry 563. The Lion and the Shepherd
- Perry 564. The Gnat and the Bull
- Perry 565. The Disdainful Horse
- Perry 566. The Birds, the Beasts, and the Bat
- Perry 567. The Nightingale and the Hawk
- Perry 568. The Envious Fox and the Wolf
- Perry 569. The King of the Apes
- Perry 570. The Goose and the Stork
- Perry 571. The Obliging Horse
- Perry 572. The Kid and the Wolf
- Perry 573. The Domestic Snake
- Perry 574. The Eagle and the Kite
- Perry 575. The Wethers and the Butcher
- Perry 576. The Fowler and the Birds
- Perry 577. The Crow and the other Birds at Dinner
- Perry 578. The Horse, the Lion and the Goats
- Perry 579. The Sword and the Passer-by
- Perry 580. The Covetous Man and the Envious Man
- Perry 581. The Boy and the Thief
- Perry 582. The Farmer and his Ox
- Perry 583. The Pig without a Heart, referenced in The Deer without a Heart
- Perry 584. The River-fish and the Sea-fish

== Extended Perry ==
=== Paulus Diaconus ===
- 585. Sick Lion, Fox and Bear. cf. 258
- 586. Calf and Stork
- 587. Flea and Gout

=== Odo of Cheriton ===
- 588. Hawk and Doves
- 589. Bird of Saint Martin
- 590. Stork and his Beak (Magpie and her Tail)
- 591. Toad and Beautiful Son
- 592. Cat as Monk
- 593. Fox and Wolf in Well
- 594. Cat, Rat, and Cheese
- 595. Isengrim as Monk
- 596. Complaint of Sheep against Wolf
- 597. Fox Confesses Sins to Rooster
- 598. Wasp and Spider
- 599. Eagle and Crow Physician
- 600. Donkey and Pig
- 601. Hen, Chicks and Kite
- 602. Dinner at the Lion's House
- 603. Goose and Crow
- 604. Kite Imitates Hawk
- 605. Fox and Cat
- 606. Crow and Dove (cf. 567)
- 607. Wolf's Funeral
- 608. Dirty Dog
- 609. Man and Unicorn
- 610. Fox and Ferryman
- 611. Fox and Hens
- 612. Falcon and Kite
- 613. Belling the Cat
- 614. Owl and Birds
- 615. Mouse in Wine Jar and Cat
- 616. Hare Contends with Wolf
- 617. Serpent in a Man's Bosom
- 618. Ungrateful Man
- 619. Mouse in quest of Mate
- 620. Stork and Serpent
- 621. Peacock stripped of Feathers
- 622. Toad and Frog
- 623. Athenian Philosopher / Goat and Donkey
- 624. Aged Father and Cruel Son
- 625. Wolf as Fisherman and Fox
- 626. Cuckoo and Eagle
- 627. Nightingale and Bowman
- 628. Wolf Confessor to Fox and Donkey
- 629. Rustic Invited to Dinner
- 630. Rustic Reared in Cow Barn
- 631. King of Greece and his Brother
- 632. Julian the Apostate and a Demon
- 633. Man Condemned to be Hanged
- 634. Philosopher who spit in King's Beard
- 635. Judgments of God revealed by Angel
- 636. Wolf and Sheep Kissing Each Other
- 637. Tame Asp
- 638. Ass with Privilege, Fox and Wolf
- 639. Eagle and Rat
- 640. Soldier and Serpent / Dragon and Peasant
- 641. Wolf and Priest
- 642. Soldier and Religious Man
- 643. Ape and Merchant

=== John of Schepey ===
- 644. Buzzard and hawk
- 645. Lion and unicorn

=== Metrical ===
- 646. Capon and hawk
- 647. Merchant and wife

=== Neckham ===
- 648. Vulture and eagle

=== Rhymed verse ===
- 649. Stag, hedgehog and boar

=== Robert's Romulus ===
- 650. Presumptuous beetle
- 651. Rustic and his wife
- 652. Cuckoo and birds
- 653. Farmer sold his horse
- 654. Eagle, hawk and crane
- 655. Wolf fasting for Lent
- 656. Swallow and sparrows
- 657. Cattle hauling dung
- 658. Hare wanted horns
- 659. Wolf and beetle

=== Brussels ===
- 660. Thief and beetle
- 661. Wife and Paramour
- 662. Thief and Satan
- 663. Dragon's Deposit
- 664. Hermit Tested Servant
- 665. Farmer Prayed for Horse
- 666. Man Praying for Himself
- 667. Townsman and Tame Daw
- 668. Three Wishes
- 669. Fox and Shadow of Moon as Cheese
- 670. Wolf sees Crow on Sheep
- 671. Fox and Dove
- 672. Eagle, Hawk, Doves
- 673. Horse and grain
- 674. Horse and Goat in package deal
- 675. Wolf and Hedgehog
- 676. Well-Meaning Wolves
- 677. Painter and Wife
- 678. Deer instructing Fawn
- 679. Crow and Young Ones
- 680. Goat and Wolf
- 681. Contentious Wife
- 682. Contrary Wife
- 683. Whispering Brigands
- 684. Physician, Rich Man and Daughter
- 685. Badger among Pigs
- 686. Wolf in Trap and Hedgehog
- 687. Wolf and Ferryman
- 688. Wolf Learning Letters
- 689. Wolf and Dove Gathering Twigs
- 690. Man in Boat
- 691. Old Man and Son
- 692. Bishop Cat

=== Extravagantes ===
- 693. Unlucky Wolf, Fox and Mule (written on hoof)
- 694. Little Boar
- 695. He-Goat and Wolf
- 696. Wolf and Ass
- 697. Serpent as Adviser
- 698. Wolf as Fisherman
- 699. Wolf's Misfortune
- 700. Hunter and Ploughman
- 701. Dog and Wolf
- 702. The Dog in the Manger
- 703. Three Sons Dividing Inheritance
- 704. Little Fox under Wolf's Tutelage
- 705. Dog, Wolf and Ram
- 706. Lion's Son learns about Man
- 707. Knight and Mendacious Squire

=== Bern ===
- 708. Ape and Bear
- 709. Dog and Slain Master
- 710. Dog and Boy in River
- 711. Ram and Baldheaded Master
- 712. Wolf and Hungry Fox
- 713. Adulterous Stork
- 714. Ram and Wolf
- 715. Fox and Sick Ape
- 716. Mouse and Daughter
- 717. Rooster and Horse Talking about Master
- 718. Generous Fox and Wolf
- 719. Dog begging Bone from Master

=== Promptuarium ===
- 720. Scarecrow

=== Poggio and Abstemius ===
- 721. Father, Son, and Donkey
- 722. Teaching Donkey to Read
- 723. Rustic Wanting to Cross River
- 724. Fly on Chariot
- 725. Fish from Frying Pan into Coals
