= The Trumpeter Taken Captive =

Fable by Aesop

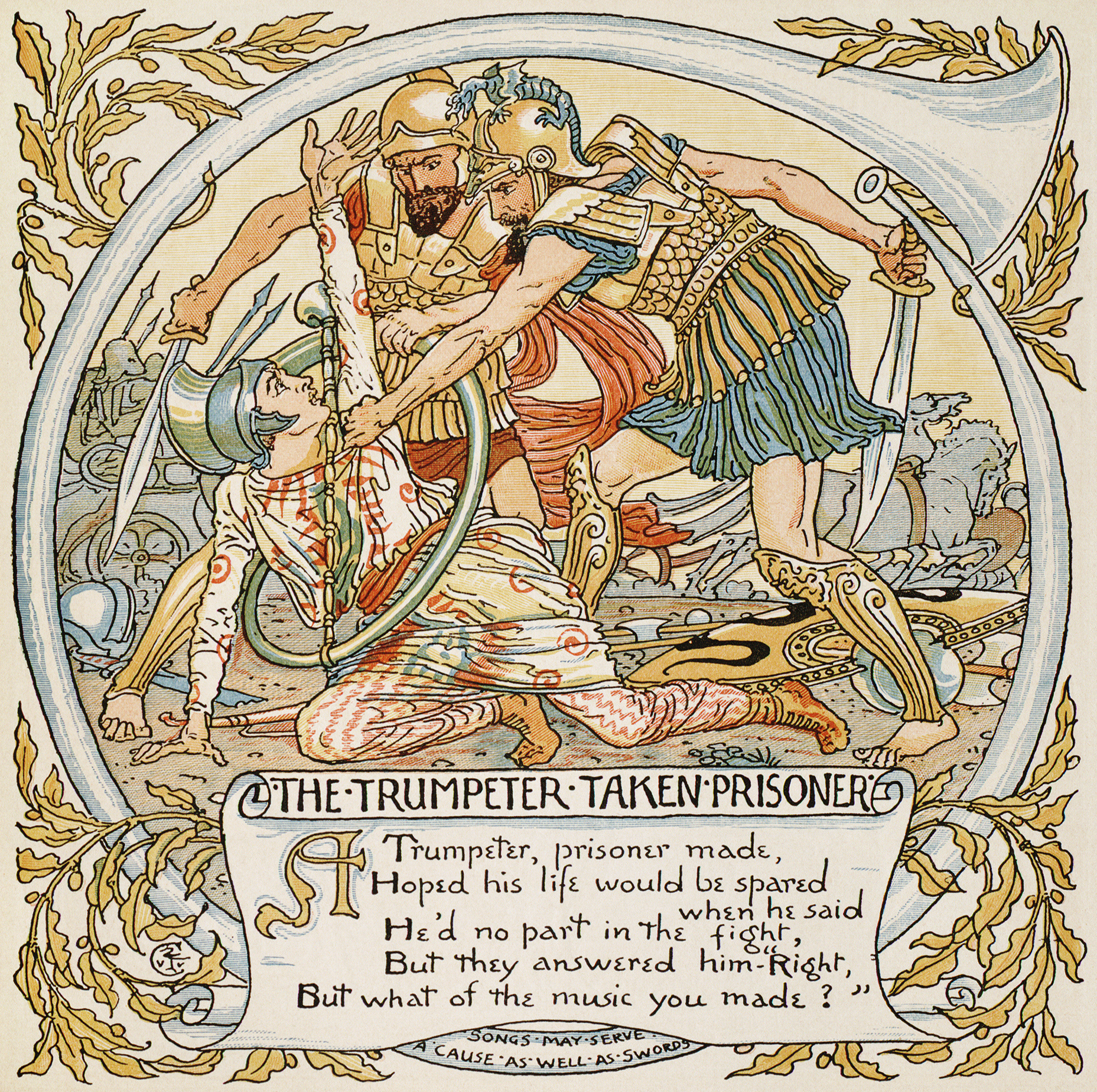
Walter Crane's 1887 illustration of the fable

The Trumpeter Taken Captive is one of Aesop's Fables and is numbered 370 in the Perry Index. One of the rare tales in which only human beings figure, it teaches that inciting others to do wrong makes one equally culpable.

== Sharing the guilt ==
The fable concerns a trumpeter who is taken by the enemy in battle and pleads to be spared on the grounds that he bears no weapons. His captors tell him that encouraging others to fight by means of his trumpet is even worse. In the Latin version by Avianus, an old soldier is disposing of his weapons in a fire and the trumpet asks to be spared but is disposed of in the same way.

In the Renaissance, Andrea Alciato included the story among his Emblemata under the heading Parem delinquentis et suasoris culpam esse (The fault belongs alike to the wrongdoer and the persuader) and was followed by the English emblematist Geoffrey Whitney in asserting that those who encourage a crime are equally guilty. The Neo-Latin poets Hieronymus Osius and Pantaleon Candidus also follow Alciato in stating that, though the trumpeter is equally at fault, he causes greater harm.

Most illustrators of the fables pictured ancient battle scenes, but Thomas Bewick updated it by dressing the trumpeter in the uniform of his times. Brooke Boothby also modernised the fable in his poetic version, which ends with the line "The poor Trumpeter was shot". William Somervile similarly chooses a contemporary setting, making his "Captive Trumpeter" the French prisoner of "a party of hussars" and condemning him to an ignominious death.

Thou by the hangman shalt expire.
'Tis just, and not at all severe,
To stop the breath that blew the fire.

Other poems of the time reserve their final lines for enforcing the moral. A school edition of 1773 concludes severely,

Peace breakers should be thoroughly detested,
Their contrivances expos'd, their plans arrested.

Boothby's contemporary, H.Steers, agrees:

The world no greater scoundrel bears
Than one who sets folk by the ears.

Another poet of that decade, the moralistic Fortescue Hitchins, devotes no less than fourteen lines to drawing the fable's lesson, applying it in addition to grumblers and gossips.

It was appreciation of the arguments employed in the fable and the belief that "musical elements lurk in gifted oratorical arguments" that later inspired the composer Jerzy Sapieyevski to feature it as the fifth piece in his Aesop Suite for brass quintet and narrator (1984), where great use is made of counterpointing.
