= The Bald Man and the Fly =

Aesop's fable

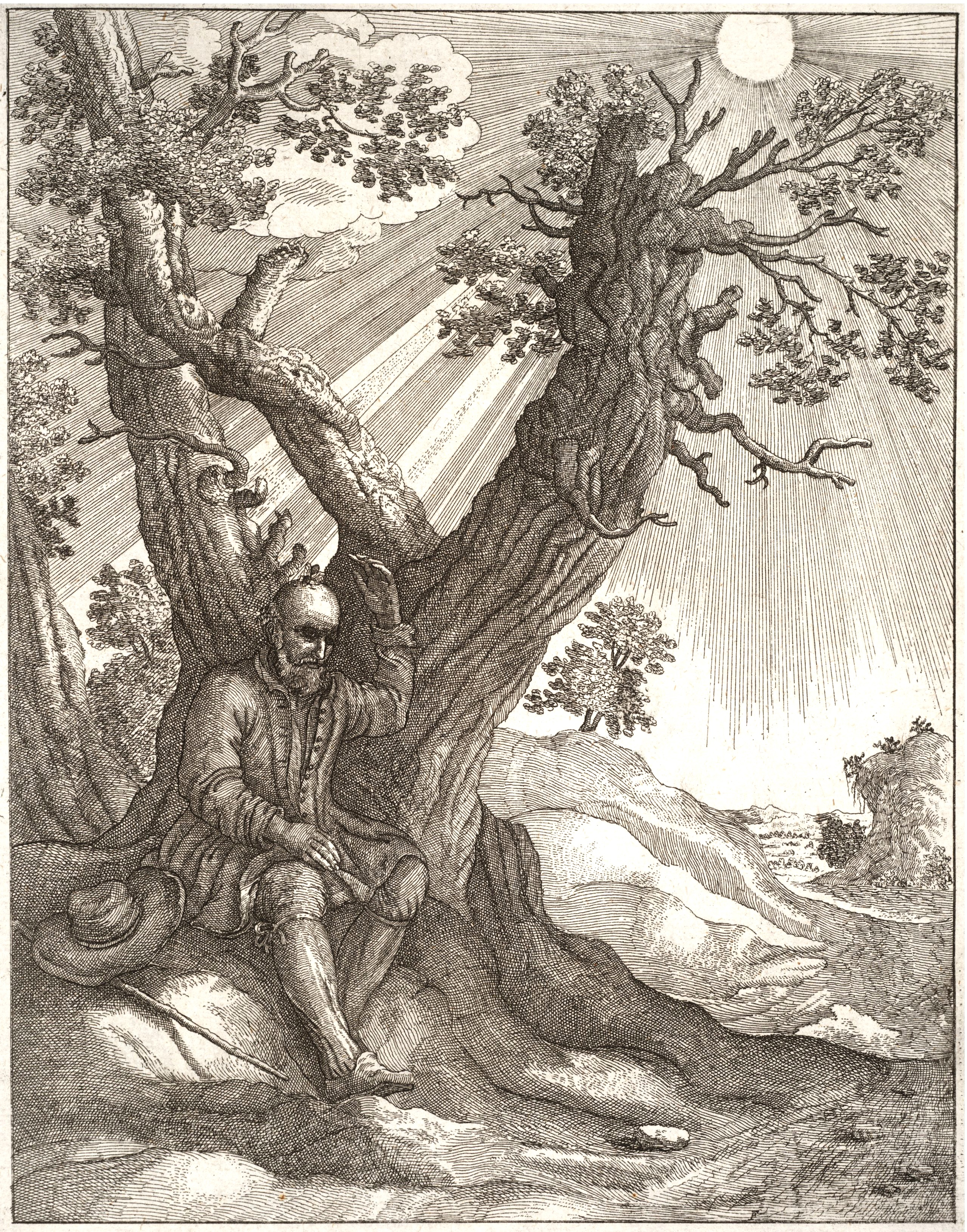
Wenceslas Hollar's illustration for John Ogilby's Aesopicks, 1666

The story of the bald man and the fly is found in the earliest collection of Aesop's Fables and is numbered 525 in the Perry Index. Although it deals with the theme of just punishment, some later interpreters have used it as a counsel of restraint.

== Deliberate damage ==
A bald-headed man is stung by a fly and then slaps the spot. When the fly ridicules him and points out that he is only harming himself by retaliating, the man replies that he is prepared to put up with even more if he can only destroy so vile a creature. Commenting on the fable recorded by Phaedrus, Francisco Rodríguez Adrados considered that its storyline was situational in origin but then developed into a debate on the proper pursuit of justice.

Though little is heard of Phaedrus' collection of fables during mediaeval times, this story reappeared in the work of others, including in Jacques de Vitry's 13th century collection of moral examples for sermons. Following the discovery of old Phaedrus manuscripts during the Renaissance, a number of verse translations of the whole work were made from the 18th century onwards: by Christopher Smart in 1753, by Brooke Boothby in 1809, by Frederick Toller in 1854, and by P. F. Widdows in 1992. In addition the fable was included among the handful translated by Ashley Cowper in 1769 as well as being updated to modern business conditions in a miscellany titled Aesop in a Monkey Suit: Fifty Fables of the Corporate Jungle.

== Inviting ridicule ==
While the injured party in the debate between the man and the fly took the moral stance that an unprovoked attack merited a severe response, the fly argued that to make too much of a slight annoyance invites ridicule. For Phaedrus "This example shows that to err by accident is pardonable, but to do damage deliberately deserves any punishment, in my opinion." While the prose versions by George Fyler Townsend and Vernon Jones omit the moral, they do include the man's vigorous defiance.

From the Middle Ages on, however, some authors have taken the fly's side in the argument. Adémar de Chabannes concluded his account with the sentiment that "One who makes enemies of the harmless, by harming himself is made laughable" (iniuriosis, qui sibi inimicos creant, et qui sibi iniuriam facit, aliis plus ridendus est), while William Caxton introduced the fable with the remark that "Of a lytel euylle may wel come a gretter". Nevertheless, the Spanish version of the fable in La vida del Ysopet con sus fabulas hystoriadas (1489), drawn from the same source as Caxton, concluded with the warning "that you should not seek enmity for pleasure or fun, for given the evil and unreasonableness of others, you can be injured by the one you hurt and annoy". John Ogilby even has the fly speak up in its own defence in his Aesopics: the reproachful "rustick" should be grateful for the lasting lesson not to leave himself uncovered to attack in future.

In the following century, William Somervile reinterpreted the fly as a nuisance-making demagogue who can safely be ignored by an aristocratic "Senate" in his poetic version of the fable, "The bald-pated Welchman and the Fly". He was followed by Joseph Jacobs, who concluded, together with the pusillanimous authors before him, that "You will only injure yourself if you take notice of despicable enemies."
