= The Man and the Lion =

Aesop's fable

The man and the lion (disputing) is one of Aesop's Fables and is numbered 284 in the Perry Index. An alternative title is The lion and the statue. The story's moral is that the source of evidence should be examined before it is accepted.

== The fable ==
A man and a lion are walking in company and dispute which of them is superior. The man points to a statue of a lion being subdued by a man as his evidence. In the Greek version, the lion retorts that if lions could sculpt, they would show themselves as the victors, drawing the moral that honesty outweighs boasting.

The commentator Francisco Rodríguez Adrados places the fable among those dialogues where boasting is logically refuted and cites as a parallel a pre-Aesopic tale in which a fox and a monkey are on a similar journey. The monkey points to the tombs of humans as those of his ancestors and the fox replies that it is easy for him to lie about those who cannot contradict. Adrados then goes on to cite as another parallel the sceptical comment by Xenophanes that "if oxen and horses or lions had hands, and could paint with their hands, and produce works of art as men do, horses would paint the forms of the gods like horses, and oxen like oxen, and make their bodies in the image of their several kinds."

Adrados traces the fable of the man and the lion to adaptations of common stories in "a Hellenistic collection of abbreviated fables that in the second century AD received a prosaic form through the work of an unknown author. This prosaic form was later more or less altered in a number of variants." A similar retort to that recorded in the fable appears in Plutarch's second-century record of the sayings of the Spartans: "Someone on seeing a painting in which Spartans were depicted as slain by Athenians, kept repeating, 'Brave, brave Athenians.' A Spartan cut in with, 'Yes, in the picture!'"

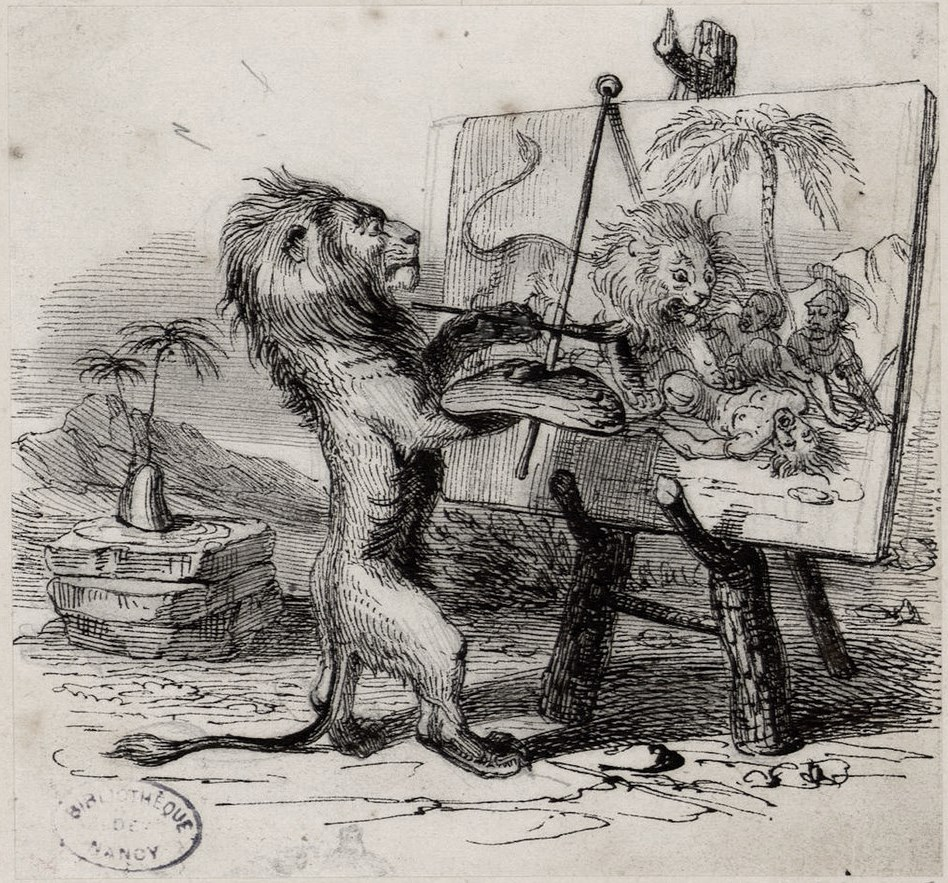
The lion creates his own version, illustration by Grandville, 1837

Other versions of the fable are similarly sceptical of self-interested claims. Where the lion of Aphthonius declines to accept the statue as evidence, on learning that it was made by a man, in the late Latin version of Ademar of Chabannes the lion takes the man to an amphitheatre to demonstrate what happens in reality, while William Caxton has the lion pounce on the man to make its point. Jefferys Taylor, however, argues facetiously, at the end of his Aesop in Rhyme (1820), that it is the fact that lions cannot sculpt which is the true proof of their inferiority.

During the Middle Ages some accounts substituted a painting for a statue, and it was following these that Jean de La Fontaine created his Le lion abattu par l'homme (The lion subdued by the man, III.10). There a passing lion retorts to those admiring a hunting scene that if lions could paint the picture would be different. Later illustrators wove whimsical variations on this. Gustave Doré pictured the admirers of a statue in an art gallery in full flight before a bystanding lion. Grandville pictured the lion with artists' implements engaged on his version of the story. Benjamin Rabier's comic publication paired a group of admiring connoisseurs with a pendant of a lion creating his own painting in the desert.

In commenting on the story, Roger L'Estrange pointed out that "'Tis against the rules of common justice for men to be judges in their own case". A later feminist critique makes the same point, citing Geoffrey Chaucer's Wyf of Bath, who in defence of her sex demanded "Who peyntede the leoun, tel me who?" and continued the fable's moral in much the same terms as the lion there.

== See also ==
- Xenophanes#Theology for quotes on anthropomorphic bias
