= The Fisherman and his Flute =

Aesop's fable

The Fisherman and his Flute appears among Aesop's Fables and is numbered 11 in the Perry Index. Wide variations on the theme have existed over the centuries.

== The fable and its analogues ==
In Classical times the fable only appears in Greek sources, most notably in the Histories of Herodotus, where Cyrus the Younger applies it to Greek envoys who submit to him too late. It tells of a fisherman piping to the fish to make them dance. When they will not oblige, he catches them in a net and mocks their death agonies: "Silly creatures, you would not dance for me before and now that I am no longer playing you do so." In this context the fable is given the political meaning that those who refuse a benefit when it is first offered will gain nothing by acting as asked when constrained to.

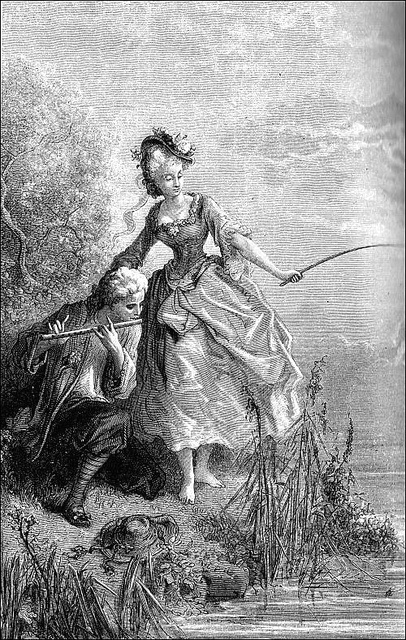
Gustave Doré's illustration of the flute-playing shepherd, 1868

The instrument played by the fisherman varies over the ages in the telling. In the Greek it is a reeded pipe (αὐλός), rather like the chanter of a bagpipe. In William Caxton's collection of fables it is indeed rendered as a bagpipe, while in the Neo-Latin of Pantaleon Candidus and Hieronymus Osius it is a tibia, which the illustrator to the latter author makes a trumpet. In La Fontaine's French version the instrument is referred to as a 'musette' which, since his fable is titled "The Fishes and the Shepherd who Played the Flute" (Les poissons et le berger qui joue de la flûte, X.10), must refer to the old piccolo oboe. Nevertheless, it was translated as bagpipe by Anne Finch, Countess of Winchilsea, in her rendering of his poem.

La Fontaine had made of the story an artificial pastoral in which Tircis tried to charm the fishes to the hook of the shepherdess Annette but did not succeed until he used a net to catch them. It ended with the cynical reflection that force accomplishes more than charm in the context of statecraft, which echoes the conclusion in Herodotus. However, different morals were drawn by other writers. According to Babrius, only when one succeeds is it time to rejoice. For William Caxton and Roger L'Estrange, the lesson to be learned is that there is a proper time and place for everything.

Other allusions to or analogues of the fable have varied widely over the centuries. Commentators have seen a likeness to the story, although only in the detail of dancing to the pipe, in Jesus's parable of the children playing in the market-place who cry to each other, "We piped for you and you would not dance; we wept and wailed and you would not mourn" (Matthew 11.16–17, Luke 7.31–2). There is an echo here too of the criticism of unresponsive behaviour found in Herodotus.

In Mediaeval times a story about a peasant who really had the power to charm fishes to the shore with his harp-playing appeared in the Gesta Romanorum, while dancing fishes figure in a fable by Ivan Krylov. There the king of the beasts has given the fox guardianship of the rivers but, when he comes on a tour of inspection, discovers the fox cooking the fish. Asked for an explanation, the fox explains that the fish in the boiling water are dancing for joy at the lion's visit.
