= The Fox and the Woodman =

Aesop's fable

The Fox and the Woodman is a cautionary story against hypocrisy included among Aesop's Fables and is numbered 22 in the Perry Index. Although the same basic plot recurs, different versions have included a variety of participants.

== The fable's history ==
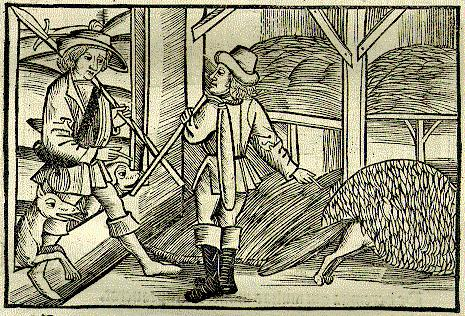
Vulpes et lignator from Sebastian Brant's 1501 edition of Aesop's Fables

There are both Greek and Latin sources for the fable. They tell of a hunted animal that asks a man to hide it. When the hunters enquire if he has seen their quarry, he says he has not but indicates the hiding place by pointing to it or looking at it. The hunters take him at his word, however, and ride off. When the animal emerges, it reproaches the man for his double-dealing. Most Greek accounts make the animal a fox who appeals to a woodman. In the Latin poem of Phaedrus the hunted animal is a hare (lepus) who appeals to a herdsman. Later Latin versions mistake the name and make the animal a wolf (lupus). It was therefore told of a wolf in the earliest printed collections of Aesop's fables in the 15th century.

A rather different version of the fable is ascribed to Aesop by the 2nd century philosopher Maximus of Tyre in his Dissertations. A lion pursuing a stag asks a shepherd if he has seen it. The man says he has not but points to the stag's hiding place, where it is killed by the lion. A fox then denounces the man as a servile coward. Maximus applies the story to the taking of contradictory philosophical positions, but later writers see it as an illustration of hypocritical behaviour. The 16th century Neo-Latin poets Hieronymus Osius and Pantaleon Candidus both treated the fox version of the fable and commented on the discordant behaviour of saying one thing and doing another. Writing in the tradition of emblem books, Johannes Posthius brought out an illustrated Aesopi Fabulae (1566) in which a German verse treatment of the fables was prefaced by a short poem in Latin summing up the moral gist of each. Fable 127 deals with the Fox and the Woodman (Vulpes et lignator) and declares that, if you want a trustworthy reputation, word and hand should agree.

The fable was also included in Poggio's prose collection of humorous anecdotes, the Facetiae, written during the 1450s. He too saw it as an illustration of hypocritical behaviour, while Roger L'Estrange, one of the few to record the fable in English after William Caxton, comments that 'Conscience is as answerable for his Fingers as for his Tongue'.
