= The Snake and the Crab =

Fable by Aesop

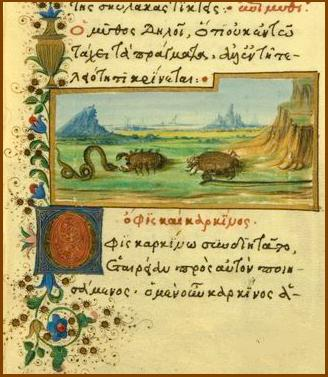
The fable of the Snake and the Crab in the 1470s Medici Manuscript

Speaking of The Snake and the Crab in Ancient Greece was the equivalent of the modern idiom, 'Pot calling the kettle black'. A fable attributed to Aesop was eventually created about the two creatures and later still yet another fable concerning a crab and its offspring was developed to make the same point.

== The fables and their origin ==
The first known mention of the snake and the crab is found in a drinking song dating from the late 6th or early 5th century BCE:

The crab spoke thus,
seizing the snake in its claws,
'One's comrade should be straight
and not think crooked thoughts.'

Since the movement of both creatures is far from direct, this is as much as to say that the pot should not call the kettle black.

A later fable, attributed to Aesop and numbered 196 in the Perry Index, relates that the two were once friends. When the snake ignored the crab's advice to lead an honest life, it was killed by the crab. The snake then became rigid and the crab commented that if it had done so earlier it need not have died. The story only appeared in Greek sources until it was included in European collections of the fables during the Renaissance. In England it was recorded by Roger L'Estrange and Samuel Croxall. These portray the crab as honest and plain dealing, drawing the moral that one should be straightforward in behaviour and beware of friendship with those who are not. The story had therefore travelled a long way from being an illustration of hypocritical behaviour.

== The crab and her daughter ==
Scholars believe that the fable of "The Two Crabs", alternatively known as "The Young Crab and its Mother" (Perry Index 322), also derives from the original Greek idiom. In this version, a young crab is told to walk straight by its mother and asks for a demonstration of how that is done. The story, recorded by Babrius and Aphthonius of Antioch in Greek and by Avianus in Latin, was taken up by William Caxton and later made the subject of new Latin poems by the German Renaissance poets Hieronymus Osius (1564) and Caspar Barth (1612). It is given the moral that those who teach should first set a good example, which at least preserves the bite of the Greek original. In the following century, La Fontaine's Fables subtly subvert the story. He titles it L'écrevisse et sa fille (The lobster and her daughter, XII.10) but begins with a eulogy of political deviousness:

The wise, sometimes, as lobsters do,
To gain their ends back foremost go.
It is the rower's art...

before telling a fable of a mere five lines out of a total of thirty. The mother instructs her daughter to be straightforward and is answered by an appeal to the force of example, of which the ironical La Fontaine approves.

== Artistic use ==
Illustrations in fable collections before the 19th century generally portrayed two crabs (or cuttlefish) together on a sandy shore. Vincent van Gogh's painting of Two Crabs is visually much the same, although the National Gallery speculates that it might "probably" be an imitation of a Japanese woodblock print by Hokusai. An alternative source of inspiration is the fable titled "Moeder en dochter krab" (Mother and daughter crab) in Dutch editions of Aesop's fables. Certainly it was from Aesop that the artist Edward Bawden got the idea for his 1956 coloured linocut of "An old crab and a young crab".

There have also been a few musical treatments of the fable, including Mabel Wood Hill's setting for piano and voice in Aesop's Fables Interpreted Through Music (1920) and in Edward Hughes Songs from Aesop's fables for children's voices and piano (1965). The earlier fable was also set in German by Andre Asriel as Die Schlange und der Krebs for mixed a cappella voices as part of his 6 Fabeln nach Aesop in 1972.
