= Ben Edwin Perry =

American classical philologist (1892–1968)

- Born: February 21, 1892; Fayette, Ohio, United States
- Died: November 1, 1968 (aged 76); Urbana, Illinois, United States
- Known for: Perry Index
- Spouse: Lillian M. Pierce
- Parent(s): Edwin Stuart Perry, Delle Wickizer Perry

Ben Edwin Perry (1892–1968) was an American professor of classics at the University of Illinois at Urbana-Champaign from 1924 to 1960. He held Guggenheim Fellowships in the years 1930–1931 and 1954–1955. He developed the Perry Index.

== Life ==
He graduated from University of Michigan, and Princeton University.

He was author of Studies in the Text History of the Life and Fables of Aesop and many other books. His Aesopica ("A Series of Texts Relating to Aesop or Ascribed to Him or Closely Connected with the Literal Tradition that Bears His Name"), published in 1952, has become the definitive edition of all fables reputed to be by Aesop, with fables arranged by earliest known source. His index of fables has been used as a reference system by later authors.

His archives are at University of Illinois.

== Works ==
- Studies in the Text History of the Life and Fables of Aesop, Haverford, Pennsylvania, American Philological Association, 1936
- Aesopica, New York, Arno Press, 1980, ISBN 9780405133374
- The Ancient Romances: A Literary-Historical Account of Their Origins, Berkeley, University of California Press, 1967.
