= The drunken mouse and the cat =

Fable from the Middle Ages

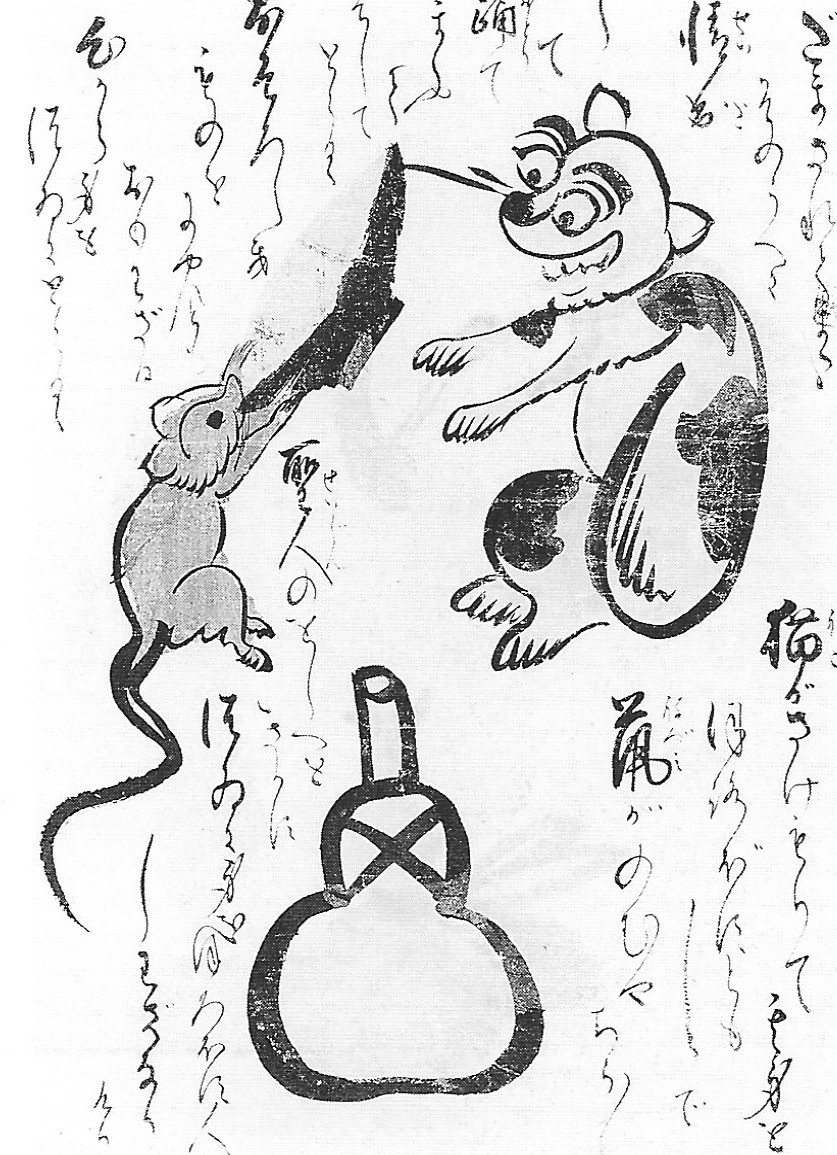
Drunken mouse and cat, Otsu-e

The story of the drunken mouse and the cat who rescued him was a joke that appeared in several mediaeval collections of stories. It is numbered 615 in the Perry Index as among those that were only recorded in the Middle Ages.

== The fable ==
A mouse falls into fermenting beer and cries for help. A passing cat offers to pull it out if it will give him a reward when asked. However, when the cat later becomes hungry, the mouse refuses to emerge from its hole to satisfy it. "What about your promise?" the cat asks. "Ah," says the mouse, "I was drunk at the time."

The story first appeared in the 13th century Parabolae of Odo of Cheriton, where the barrel into which the mouse falls is said to be either of wine or beer. Told 'against those who do not keep their word', it was also recorded about the same time among the Jewish 'fox fables' of Berechiah ha-Nakdan. Later it is found in the 14th century Gesta Romanorum with the comment that what is promised in time of peril is not often fulfilled.

In England the proverb 'drunk as a mouse' also emerged during the Middle Ages, appearing in the work of Geoffrey Chaucer and John Skelton, among others.
