= The Dogs and the Lion's Skin =

Fable attributed to Aesop

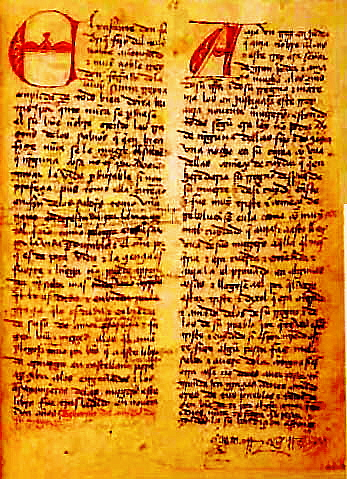
A 13th century Spanish translation of Syntipas

The Dogs and the Lion's Skin is a fable ascribed to Aesop and is numbered 406 in the Perry Index. However, it is only found in a mediaeval Greek manuscript claiming to be a translation from the Syriac (Syntipas, Fable 19). The story relates how some dogs, finding the skin of a lion, began to tear it to pieces. Seeing them, a passing fox remarked, "If this lion were alive, you would soon find out that his claws were stronger than your teeth."

The moral in the original commented that "the fable is for people who attack a man of renown when he has fallen from his position of power and glory". When the fable was retranslated by George Fyler Townsend in 1867, he shortened this to the statement generally connected with it now, "It is easy to kick a man that is down". In her collection of the fables, Laura Gibbs compares the moral with the Biblical proverb "A living dog is better than a dead lion" (Ecclesiastes 9:4).
