= The Mouse and the Oyster =

Fable by Aesop

The cautionary tale of The Mouse and the Oyster is rarely mentioned in Classical literature but is counted as one of Aesop's Fables and numbered 454 in the Perry Index. It has been variously interpreted, either as a warning against gluttony or as a caution against unwary behaviour.

== A warning to the unwary ==
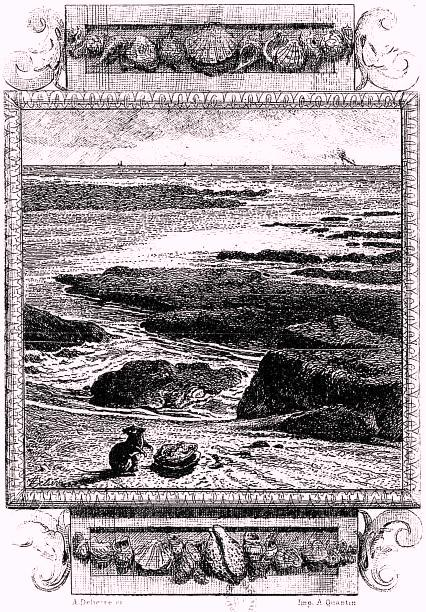
Auguste Delierre's copperplate of the La Fontaine fable, 1883

The earliest mention of the fable is in a Greek Anthology poem of the 1st century CE by Antiphilus of Byzantium. A house-mouse comes across an oyster and tries eating it, only for the shell to snap shut, bringing him at once both death and a tomb. In the following century, the orator Aelius Aristides gives the story a political interpretation as a warning to avoid entrapment in dangerous situations.

A flowery Latin version of the Greek poem was made by Andrea Alciato for his book of emblems(1531), where it figures as a picture of greed. He was followed in this interpretation by the English emblematist Geoffrey Whitney, who turns it into a health warning:

The Gluttons fatte, that daintie fare devoure,
And seeke about, to satisfie theire taste:
And what they like, into theire bellies poure,
This justlie blames, for surfettes come in haste:

And biddes them feare, their sweete, and dulcet meates,
For oftentimes, the same are deadlie baites.

The Frome physician Samuel Bowden reads the same lesson into it in his mock-heroic poem 'occasion'd by a Mouse caught in an Oyster-Shell' (1736) that concludes with the lines

Instructed thus – let Epicures beware,
Warn'd of their fate – nor seek luxurious fare.

Bowden's poem was a popular one and anthologised for a century afterwards. By that time, however, translations of La Fontaine's Fables were offering an alternative moral. The French author's mouse is a naive creature who knows the world only from books and comes to grief not simply through greed but for lack of experience. In this lively poem, one of La Fontaine's images recalls Alciato's emblem. Arriving at the sea, where 'The tide had left the oysters bare/ He thought these shells the ships must be'. In some of the illustrations to Alciato's work there is indeed a similarity between the pattern on the shell that has closed on the mouse and the boat under sail on the sea.
