= The Old Woman and the Wine-jar =

Aesop's fable

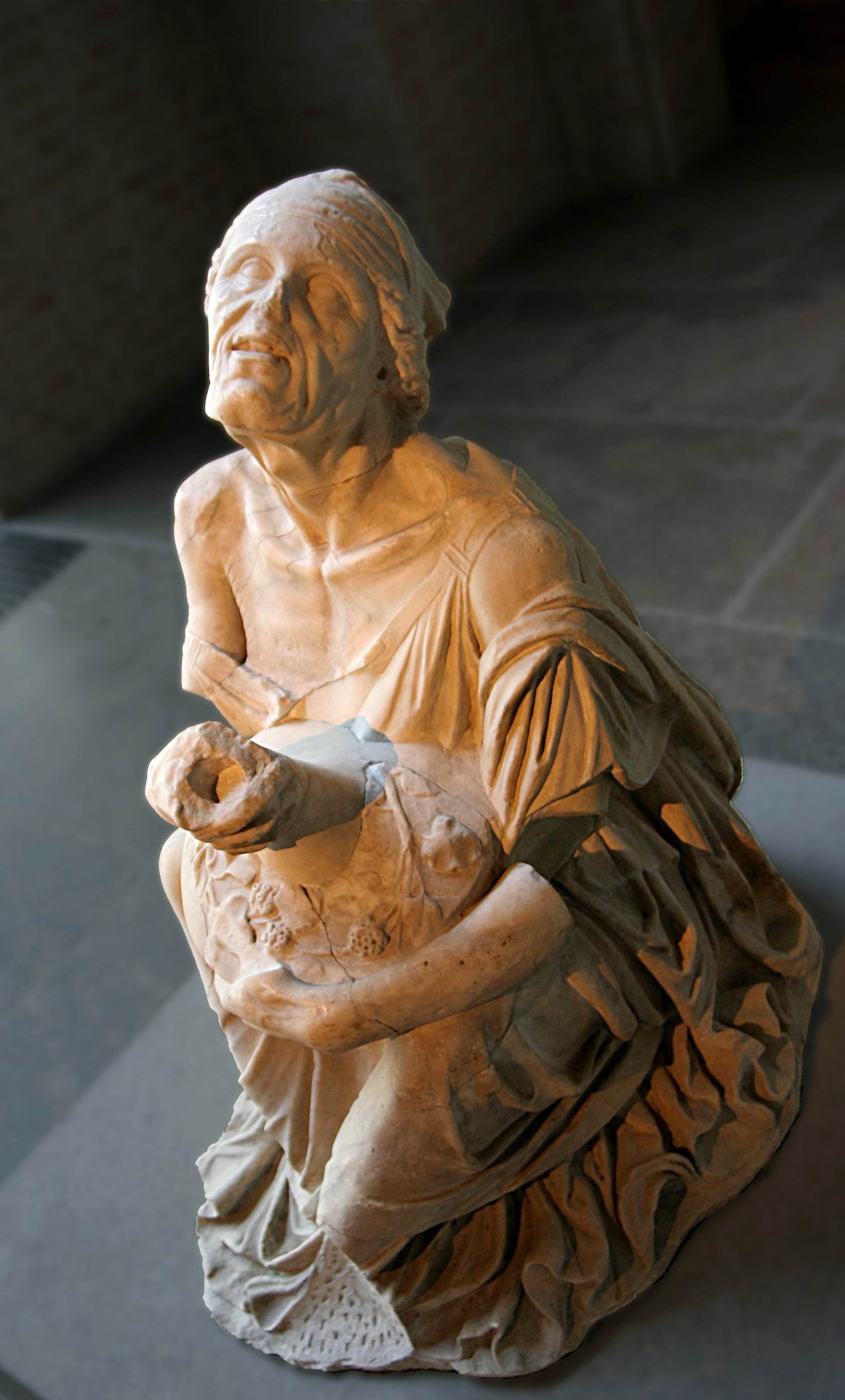
A Roman copy after a Greek original of the 2nd century BCE

The Old Woman and the Wine Jar is one of Aesop's Fables and is numbered 493 in the Perry Index. It has been applied to situations where an influence for good is lasting, such as the effect of education.

== Fable and interpretation ==
The story appears in the form of a short anecdote in the collection of Phaedrus and concerns an old woman who comes across an empty wine jar, the lingering smell of which she appreciatively sniffs and praises, saying 'Oh sweet spirits, I do declare, how excellent you must once have been to have left behind such fine remains!' Phaedrus is playing with the comic stereotype of the drunken old woman, who was a stock figure of both Greek and Roman comedy, as illustrated in the statue here.

The fable has been used comparatively rarely. In France an illustration of it appeared in the first emblem book of Guillaume Guéroult, accompanied by a long poem on the importance of educating children early. The introductory verse comments on how a new pot will always carry the savour of the first liquid that filled it. In "The Barrel", the Russian Fabulist Ivan Krylov told a similar illustrative story and applied it to education.

The poems of Phaedrus began to be translated into English during the 18th century. He himself had been reticent about the story's application, simply stating "People who know me will be able to say what this fable is about". In Thomas Bewick's Fables of Aesop and Others (1818), the commentary takes this to mean that the effect of education shows in this production of his old age. At the end of his own version, George Fyler Townsend gives it the moral, "the memory of a good deed lives".
