= The Deer without a Heart =

Aesop's fable

The Deer without a Heart is an ancient fable, attributed to Aesop in Europe and numbered 336 in the Perry Index. It involves a deer (or an ass in Eastern versions) who was twice persuaded by a wily fox to visit the ailing lion. After the lion had killed it, the fox stole and ate the deer's heart. When asked where it is, the fox reasoned that an animal so foolish as to visit a lion in his den cannot have had one, an argument that reflects the ancient belief that the heart was the seat of thoughts and intellect. The story is catalogued as type 52 in the Aarne-Thompson classification system.

== The story from the East ==
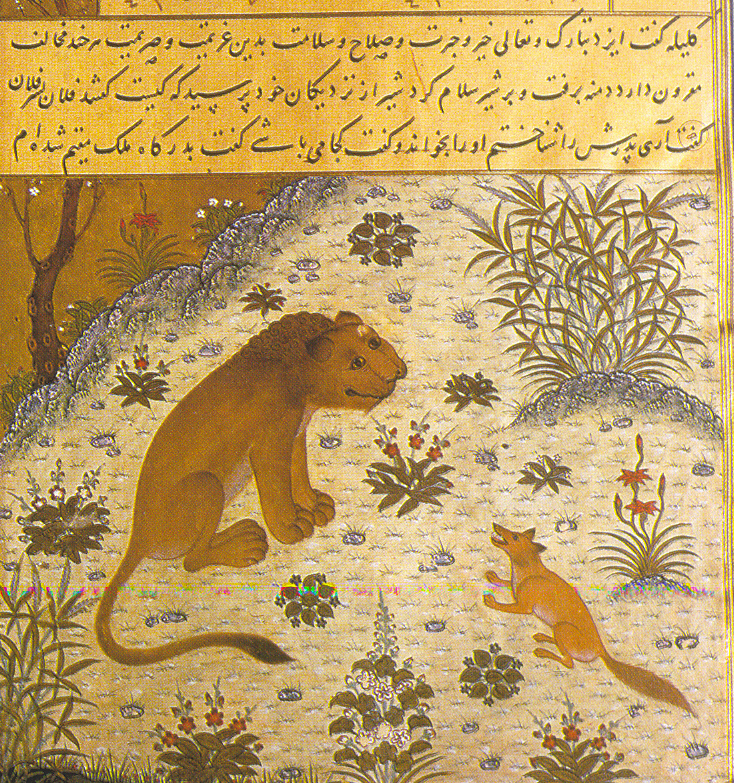
The fox reports to the lion, from a 15th-century Persian translation of the Panchatantra

The version of the story found in the Indian Panchatantra concerns a lion who is persuaded that the cure for his sickness is the ears and heart of an ass. His servant the jackal persuades an ass to accompany him but the lion is too weak to kill the ass on the first attempt and the jackal has to trick it into returning. Afterwards the jackal persuades the hungry lion to leave him with the dead ass and takes the ears and heart for himself. His explanation for their absence is that so silly an animal cannot have had the equipment to hear or to think with.

The story travelled westwards through a series of translations and adaptations and was eventually carried to Spain by invading Arabs. By this time the details of the story had altered considerably. In one Arab version an ass demands toll of the lion and is killed for this effrontery. The heart is eaten by a fox who says it could never have existed in so stupid an animal. There also exist Jewish versions of the story, in one of which the ass figures as toll-keeper and in the other demands a fare on board ship.

== The story from the West ==
The story of "The Lion, the Fox and the Deer" is an ancient one that first appeared in the poetry of Archilochus and was told at great length in the collection of Babrius. In this the fox twice persuades the deer to visit the lair of a lion too sick to hunt, on the first occasion escaping with an injured ear; the fox explains this as a rough caress and the deer returns to its death. It was only recorded in Greek, so that Mediaeval European variants may equally be of Eastern rather than Western origin. Thus in Marie de France's telling, the lion requires the deer's heart as a cure for its illness, as in the Panchatantra.

The very different version in her contemporary, Berechiah ha-Nakdan's "Fox Fables", appears to owe something to a Latin poem by Avianus, numbered 583 in the Perry Index. In this a boar has its ears cut off as a punishment for roaming in the fields of an estate and later pays for it with his life. A thieving peasant explains the missing heart to his master in the usual way. But in Berechiah's telling the wild boar trespasses in the royal lion's garden and, after losing its ears and eyes in punishment, is finally killed and the heart is stolen by the fox. These final details demonstrate a synthesis with other versions of the fable, of which there appear to be many by this time. A still later Spanish version by Juan Ruiz, involves a musical ass who keeps the lion awake with his discordant music and in this case loses his heart and ears to the wolf.

The process of transformation continues into modern times. In Stuart Croft's 12-minute film The Stag without a Heart (2009/10), the story is recounted at length in an endlessly circuitous version by having the fox replace the heart it has stolen in the deer as a means of persuading it to return to the lion's presence.
