= The Kite and the Doves =

Aesop's fable

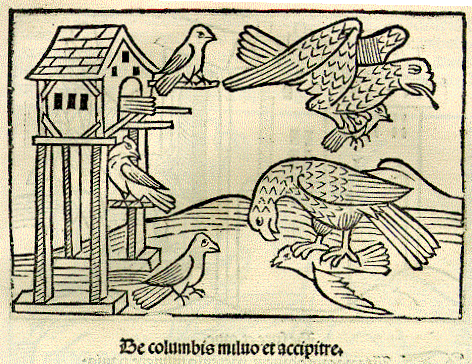
A 15th century illustration of the fable from Heinrich Steinhöwel's collection of Aesop's Fables

The Kite and the Doves is a political fable ascribed to Aesop that is numbered 486 in the Perry Index. During the Middle Ages the fable was modified by the introduction of a hawk as an additional character, followed by a change in the moral drawn from it.

== The Phaedrus version ==
The first appearance of the fable is in the collection of Phaedrus (Book 1.31). It is an illustration of political foolishness and tells how doves are so terrified by attacks on them by a kite that they agree to its suggestion that he should be elected their king and protector. They only realise their mistake when the kite begins to prey on them as its royal prerogative.

After Phaedrus's work was lost sight of during the Middle Ages, a new version of the fable was created and it was not until after rediscovery of his original text during the Renaissance that some later collections followed his telling. Samuel Croxall, harking back to a series of recent changes of regime, commented on how "many, with the Doves in the Fable, are so silly that they would admit of a Kite rather than be without a king". Two pages later, Croxall goes on to mention that he has followed the sense of Phaedrus "in every fable of which he has made a version" (p. 32).

== The hawk, the kite and the pigeons ==
During the Middle Ages new versions of the fable developed in Latin, of which Odo of Cheriton recorded several at the end of the 12th century. One of these is a variant of The Frogs Who Desired a King in which the frogs have elected a log to rule over them and, when that is perceived as of no value, choose a snake instead and are eaten by it. Another concerns chickens, or else birds generally, who elect a dove to be their ruler because it is mild and will do them no harm; but when it is perceived as lacking authority, they choose a kite in its place and are then preyed upon by it. In the version of Romulus Anglicus, doves who are living in a state of general threat elect a falcon as their protector, while according to Walter of England the doves are at war with the kites and choose a hawk to defend them. The latter story ends with the detail that the hawk kills many more of them than had perished formerly and concludes with the advice that the remedy should not make a bad situation worse.

Versions of Walter's story were perpetuated in English by William Caxton and Roger L'Estrange. Elsewhere in Europe it formed the basis of Neo-Latin poems by Hieronymus Osius and Pantaleon Candidus. The fable was also adapted by John Hawkesworth into his reflective political poem, "The Danger of trusting Individuals with exorbitant Power". In that, the king of the doves prays to Jove for help against a marauding kite and is changed in form to a more powerful bird of prey. After his victory, however, the king becomes an even worse tyrant in his turn. The political moral that Hawkesworth drew from this was similar to Croxall's in requiring a democratic system of checks and balances:

Wrongs to redress, ne'er arm alone your friend,
But cloth'd in equal Might his steps attend.
