= The Hare in flight =

Aesop's fable

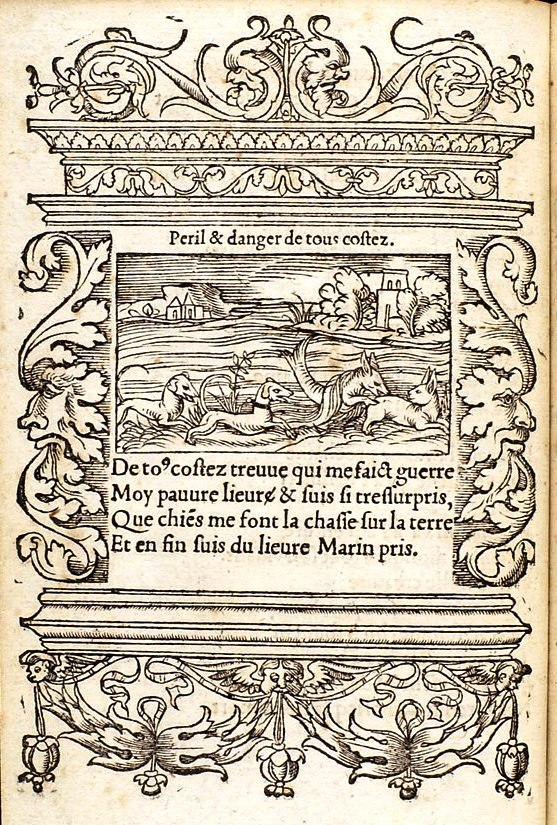
"Peril on all sides" from Gilles Corrozet's Hecatomographie (1540)

The reason for the hare to be in flight is that it is an item of prey for many animals and also subject to hunting by humans. There are three fables of ancient Greek origin that refer to hare chasing, each of which also exemplifies a popular idiom or proverb.

== The Greek Anthology ==
Three poems from the Greek Anthology refer to an otherwise unrecorded fable in which a hare on the run from hunting dogs leaps into the sea, only to be seized there by a 'sea-dog', a Mediterranean shark. The first two poems are by Germanicus Caesar, the second of which ends poignantly,

Beasts of water and land rage against me alike.
Hares, may the air be your recourse; yet I fear
You too, O Heaven, have a dog among your stars!

In the course of his first poem, Germanicus refers directly to the Greek equivalent of the proverbial idiom that was to develop into the modern-day 'Out of the frying pan into the fire'.

The subject of the hare's fate was subsequently taken up in Latin by Ausonius in a four-line epigram reliant upon the Greek poems. The situation also figured in Gilles Corrozet's Hecatomographie (1540). This was an Emblem book in which the story's significance was widened to the uncertainty of life in general under the title "Peril and danger on all sides" (see illustration).

== The Hare, the Hound and the Goatherd ==
This brief fable is one of Aesop's and is numbered 331 in the Perry Index. It concerns a dog at whom a goatherd jeers for being outstripped by the hare it was chasing. The dog replies that he should bear in mind the difference between the two contestants. "I was merely running for my dinner but he was running for his life".

A form of the story was told with a good deal more circumstance by the mediaeval churchman Odo of Cheriton in his "The contest of the wolf and the hare". After the two creatures meet and agree to fight, having pledged a wager, the hare takes to its heels and the wolf eventually collapses exhausted, conceding the contest. The hare explains that he uses the weapons he has, his legs for running, and with "this tactic I have fought against the dogs ... and won!" The fable is then given the religious interpretation that the best way to oppose lust is to flee its occasions.

== The ambivalent chase ==
This too is one of Aesop's fables, numbered 136 in the Perry Index. A dog chasing close behind a hare occasionally nips it and at other times licks and fawns upon it until the hare demands that he make up his mind and treat her either as an enemy or a friend. It is directed against the two-faced who, as the proverb says, 'hold with the hare and run with the hounds'.
