= The Snake in the Thorn Bush =

Aesop's fable

The Snake in the Thorn Bush is a rare fable of Greek origin with a West Asian analogue. It is numbered 96 among Aesop's Fables in the Perry Index. In Greek sources, a snake entwined in a thorn hedge is swept away by a flood and mocked by a fox with the words 'A wicked ship, and worthy of its sailor!' The moral drawn is that the evil come to grief from the company they keep. The West Asian variant occurs in the story of Ahikar, where the sage reproaches his adopted nephew for treacherously returning evil for good: 'Thou hast been to me as a snake that wound itself round a bramble and fell into a river. A wolf saw it and said: Lo the evil is mounted on the evil, and evil that which drives them along.' In later, less reliable versions, the snake rebukes the wolf for the animals that it has snatched, making it a fable of the pot calling the kettle black type.
