= The Fir and the Bramble =

Fable by Aesop

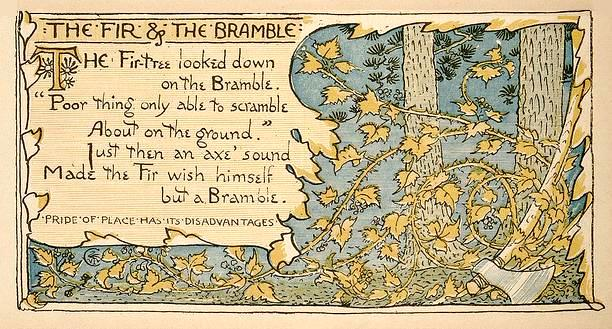
Walter Crane's illustration from Baby's Own Aesop, 1887

The Fir and the Bramble is one of Aesop's Fables and is numbered 304 in the Perry Index. It is one of a group in which trees and plants debate together, which also includes The Trees and the Bramble and The Oak and the Reed. The contenders in this fable first appear in a Sumerian debate poem of some 250 lines dating from about 2100 BCE, in a genre that was ultimately to spread through the Near East.

== The fable ==
There are several versions of the fable in Greek sources and a late Latin version recorded by Avianus. It concerns a fir tree that boasted to a bramble, 'You are useful for nothing at all; while I am everywhere used for roofs and houses.' Then the Bramble answered: 'You poor creature, if you would only call to mind the axes and saws which are about to hew you down, you would have reason to wish that you had grown up a Bramble, not a Fir-Tree.' The moral of the story is that renown is accompanied by risks of which the humble are free.

William Caxton (1484) was the first to provide an English version, taking the story from Avianus and giving it the title The busshe and the aubyer tree. In John Ogilby's verse edition (1668) the fable is titled The Cedar and the Shrub but most later collections give it as The Fir and the Bramble. In Victorian times the fable's moral was updated to "Better poverty without care, than riches with."
