= The Ass and the Pig =

Aesop's fable

The Ass and the Pig is one of Aesop's Fables (Perry Index 526) that was never adopted in the West but has Eastern variants that remain popular. Their general teaching is that the easy life and seeming good fortune of others conceal a threat to their welfare.

== Eastern and Western variations ==
The earliest Latin version of this tale is in a poem by Phaedrus and concerns a pig that was fattened on barley and then sacrificed. The left-over grain was given to the ass, who refused it because of the fate that had overtaken the one it had previously fed. The kind of skewed logic in operation here, seeming to confuse cause and effect, is often found in the fables and led Aristophanes to characterise such stories as 'Aesop's jests'. Its function, however, is to fix attention on the distinction in practical philosophy between the immediate and the ultimate good. An unsolicited meal is the immediate good in this story, but the ultimate good is to consider where acceptance of an immediate advantage might lead. Phaedrus himself does just this. He tells the story in the poem's first six lines and follows them with six more lines of personal reflections upon it. 'This fable taught me caution and I have avoided risky business ventures ever since - but, you say, 'those who grab wealth get to keep it'. Just remember how many of them are eventually caught and killed! Clearly, the ones who have been punished constitute the larger crowd. A few people may profit from reckless behaviour, but many more are ruined by it.'

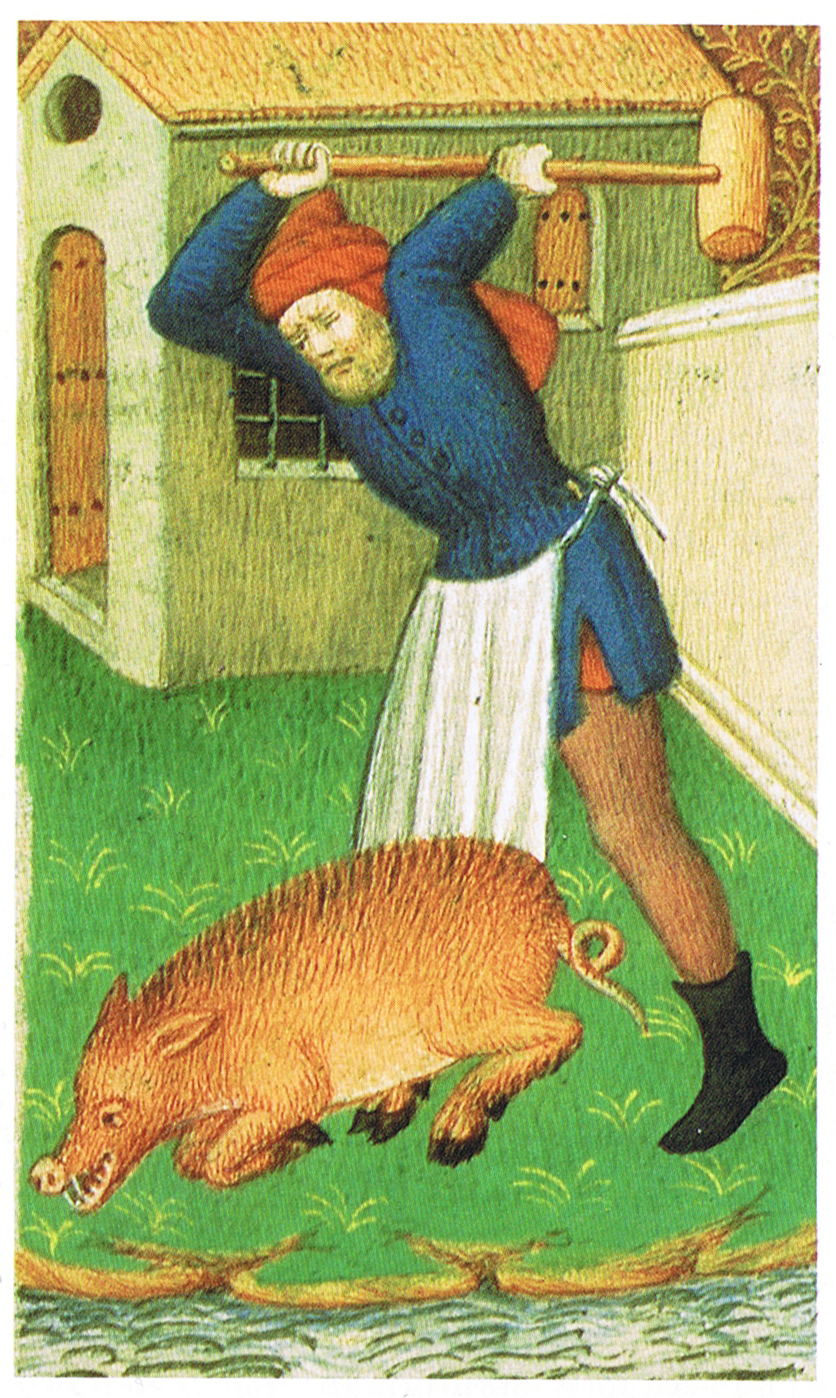
An illustration from a mediaeval cookbook

Although this story was not taken up by later authors, another concerning an ox and a heifer had a little more currency and is given a separate number in the Perry Index (300). In this a bullock compares his own carefree existence with that of an ox compelled to labour in the fields. Shortly afterwards the owner releases the ox from his yoke but binds the bullock and leads him away to be sacrificed. Then the ox informs the victim, 'It was for this reason that you were allowed to live in idleness.' The common feature between Phaedrus' story and this involves the survival of a working animal while the one that leads a life of ease meets an early and violent death. In his edition, Samuel Croxall includes this fable under the title "The Wanton Calf" and draws from it the lesson that those who despise the honest poor are often criminals who eventually pay for their way of life. Phaedrus had similarly made the link between grasping the immediate advantage and criminality. The moral is further summed up by the short poem that Thomas Bewick adds in his reprinting of Croxall's fable:

Thus oft the industrious poor endures reproach
From rogues in lace, and sharpers in a coach;
But soon to Tyburn sees the villains led
While he still earns in peace his daily bread.

A much earlier Indian version of the story makes the relationship between the two Aesopic tales a little clearer. It appears in the Buddhist scriptures as the Munika-Jataka and is accompanied by a frame story in which a monk regrets the life of ease he has left and is tempted back. His situation is made clear to him by the relation of an animal fable (supposedly of a former birth) in which a young ox complains to his elder brother of the easy lot of the farmyard pig. Soon afterwards the pig is slaughtered for a marriage feast and the ox finds comfort in the reflection that a simpler diet is at least a guarantee of survival. Although different pairs of animals are involved in largely different situations, and although the conclusions that their authors draw from them also differ, their trend is always the same. In an unstable world, a life of humble drudgery has its rewards.

The Jataka tale travelled westwards in a variety of new versions. Much the same story, with asses in the place of oxen, appears as a Midrash in the Jewish Great Commentary on Esther 3.2. It reappears in a much changed form in the One Thousand and One Nights as the tale of "The Ass, the Ox and the Labourer". Here an ox complains to an ass of its hard life and is advised to play sick; this it does to such effect that the ass is put to work in its place. In order to avoid any more such labour, the ass informs the ox that he has overheard their master giving orders for the ox to be butchered the following day, which brings a speedy end to its pretended illness.

A version of this story eventually reached Europe and is recorded in the 13th century by Odo of Cheriton. Envious of the easy life of the pig, an ass pretends to be sick, is put on a convalescent diet and soon begins to fatten. When the pig is slaughtered, however, it takes fright and returns to work. It may be coincidental that Odo's commentary on the story echoes the Jataka in picturing how the clergy may be seduced by the luxuries of lay life. Another element that the last two stories have in common is also shared with Phaedrus' story of "The Ass and the Pig". Association of a better diet with fattening before slaughter leads the animals who benefit from it to renounce such luxuries and the dangers they bring for a life of secure sufficiency. In this they share the same conclusion as the fable of The Town Mouse and the Country Mouse.
