= The Woodcutter and the Trees =

Fable by Aesop

The title of The Woodcutter and the Trees covers a complex of fables that are of West Asian and Greek origins, the latter ascribed to Aesop. All of them concern the need to be wary of harming oneself through misplaced generosity.

== The Fables ==
=== Western Asia and Greece ===
One of the earliest allusions to a fable of this kind occurs in the story of Ahiqar, a royal counsellor to late Assyrian kings who is betrayed by his adopted son Nadan. When the young man begs for a second chance he is answered with a string of reasons, drawing on West Asian folklore, why this would be useless. Among them is the accusation that 'Thou hast been to me like the tree that said to its woodcutters, "If something of me were not in your hands, ye had not fallen upon me".' This refers to the fact that the axes of the woodmen have wooden shafts and the trees have therefore contributed to their own doom. A number of proverbs derive from the story, with the general meaning of being to blame for one's own misfortune. They include the Hebrew 'the axe goes to the wood from whence it borrowed its helve,' of which there are Kannada and Urdu equivalents, and the Turkish 'When the axe came into the Forest, the trees said "The handle is one of us".'

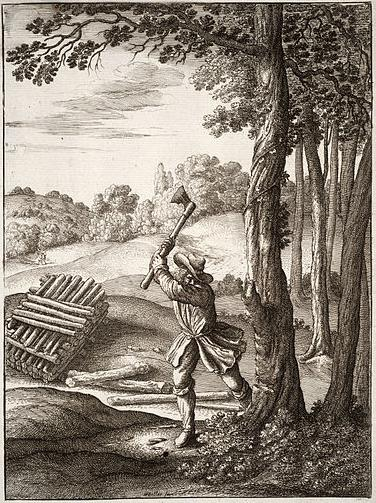
Wenceslas Hollar's engraving of the woodcutter, included in John Ogilby's collection of Aesop's Fables, 1664

In the Greek cultural area, which at one time included all of West Asia, there were three fables dealing with the relations between trees and woodcutters. In one of these, numbered 302 in the Perry Index, the oaks complain about their treatment to Zeus, the king of the gods, who answers that they have only themselves to blame for supplying the wood for their axe staves.

A different fable of similar meaning is The Eagle Wounded by an Arrow, numbered 276 in the Perry Index. In it an Eagle complains of being wounded by an arrow vaned with its own feathers. Commentaries on these fables point out that suffering is increased by the knowledge that it is one's own fault.

=== Trust betrayed ===
In another variant of the theme, a woodman comes into the forest and begs the trees 'to give him a handle made of the hardest wood. The other trees selected the wood of the wild olive. The man took the handle and fitted it to his axe. Then, without a moment's hesitation, he began to chop down the trees' mighty branches and trunks, taking whatever he wanted. The oak tree then said to the ash, 'It serves us right, since we gave our enemy the handle he asked for!' This text comes from the Mediaeval Latin fable collection of Ademar of Chabannes, who comments upon it, 'You should think twice before offering anything to your enemies' (Ut cogites ante ne hosti aliqua praestes).

This version was taken up early by the Anglo-French poet Marie de France and was also preferred by 15th century collectors of fables in European vernaculars like Heinrich Steinhowel and William Caxton. During Renaissance times it was made the subject of poems by the German Neo-Latinists Hieronymus Osius and Pantaleon Candidus. Jean de la Fontaine also made it the subject of his La forêt et le bûcheron (Fables X11.16), translated by Elizur Wright as "The Woods and the Woodman". In his telling, the woodman breaks his promise to work further off and not harm his benefactors. A version based on this was set for accompanied children's voices by the composer Rudolf Schmidt-Wunstorf (b. 1916).

This final fable was retold by Rabindranath Tagore in a six-line poem included in his Bengali collection Kanika (1899). Later, he condensed it as Poem 71 in his English-language collection Stray Birds (1916):

The woodcutter's axe begged for its handle from the tree.

The tree gave it.

In the Bengali collection, the poem was titled "Politics", and with this clue the reader was expected to interpret the fable in the context of the time as a parable of the imperial stripping of Indian resources.
