= The Fowler and the Snake =

Aesop's fable

The Fowler and the Snake is a story of Greek origin that demonstrates the fate of predators. It was counted as one of Aesop's Fables and is numbered 115 in the Perry Index.

== Fable and its interpretation ==
There are two Greek sources for this fable, giving conflicting interpretations. One describes how a fowler is so intent on preparing his bird-snares that he treads on a snake and dies from its bite. This story, we are assured, 'shows that when people plot against their neighbours, they fall victim to the same sort of plot themselves'. The sentiment is common in the early fables; the alternative story of the Crow and the Snake comes to the same conclusion. However, the basic situation is transposed by the 2nd century BCE poet, Antipater of Sidon, in a poem collected in the Greek Anthology. Included in the section of sepulchral epigrams, it concerns a countryman keeping the birds from his crops who has stepped on a viper and now sends this warning from the grave:

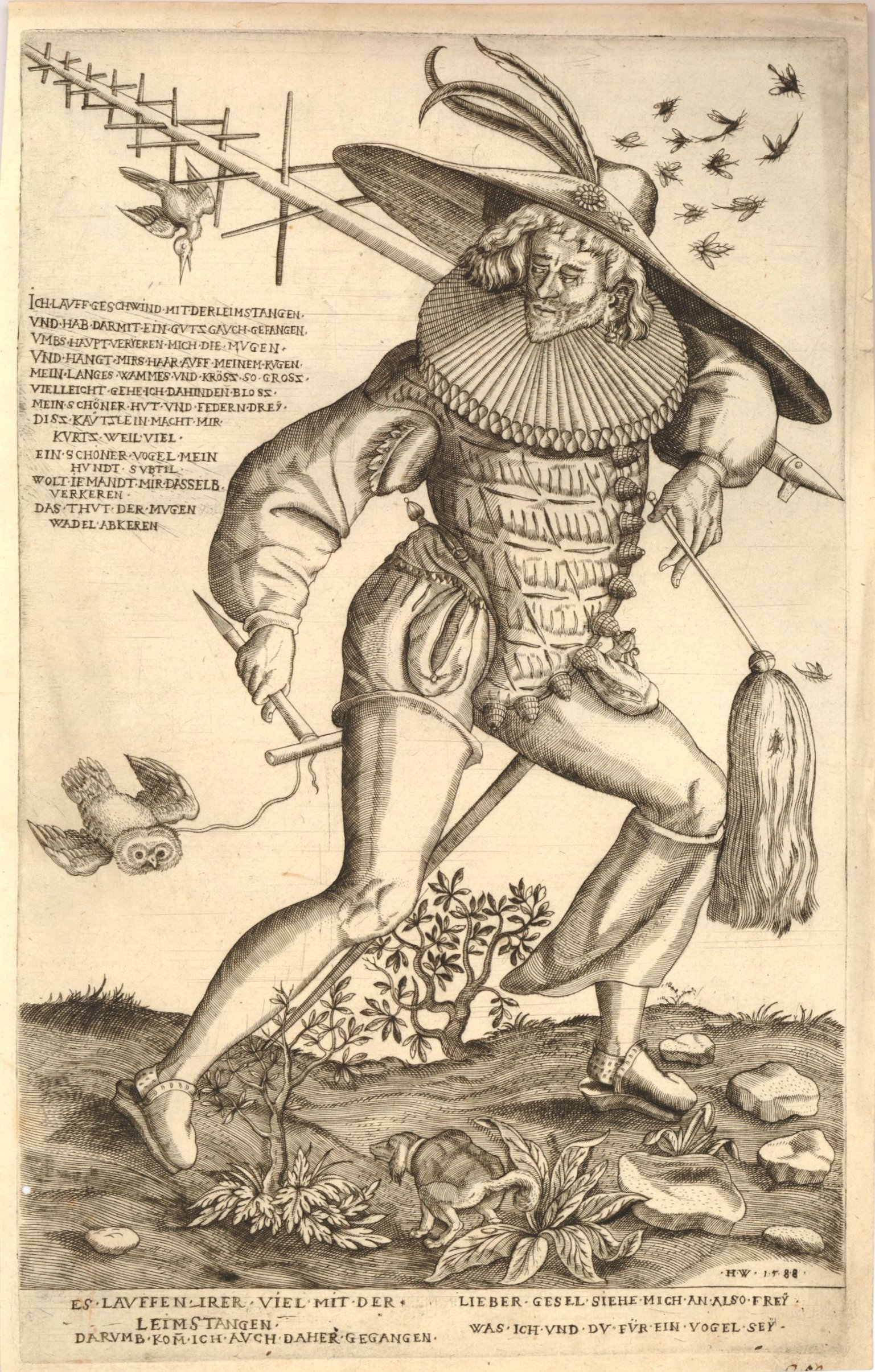
Heinrich Wirrich's broadside satire on human folly showing a fowler, 1588

See how, gazing at what was in the air,
I did not see the evil creeping at my feet.

Andrea Alciato coalesces the two in the Latin poem in his Emblemata (1531), which illustrates the theme 'Those who contemplate the heights will fall' (qui alta contemplantur, cadere). The story is told of a fowler out hunting and concludes, 'Thus the man dies, who looks to the stars with drawn-back bow'. The preceding emblem had illustrated the fable of the Astrologer who Fell into a Well and this continues the lesson there of the need to keep one's attention focussed on the things of this world. The English emblematist Geoffrey Whitney also uses the story in his Choice of Emblemes (1586) under the device 'Look not on high' (noli altum sapere) but extends the lesson in the second and third stanzas of his accompanying poem. While the third cautions those who practise 'astronomie',

Whoe leave the earthe, and studie on the skie,
As if they coulde all worldlie thinges expresse,

his second warns against pride in learning,

Leste when theire mindes do mounte unto the skies,
Their fall is wrought, by thinges they doe dispise.

The first meaning of the story was not lost sight of, however. The Renaissance poet Hieronymus Osius keeps close to the original telling in his Latin version. A fowler is intent on preparing a snare of reeds and bird-lime, then catches sight of a thrush and inadvertently steps on the snake. He dies in the knowledge that killer hunters will die through the agency of others that hunt to kill. English tellings, such as those of Roger L'Estrange and Samuel Croxall, speak of the ways of 'Providence'.

Illustrations of the fable show a wider variety of bird-catching methods than the text, including setting up nets (as in the edition of Osius), using a bow and arrow (Alciato) or even (as in Croxall) a fowling piece. The species of birds involved are also wide. Antipater mentions starlings and cranes; Alciato thrushes, larks and cranes; L'Estrange has a pigeon and Croxall a ringdove.
