= The Trees and the Bramble =

Fable by Aesop

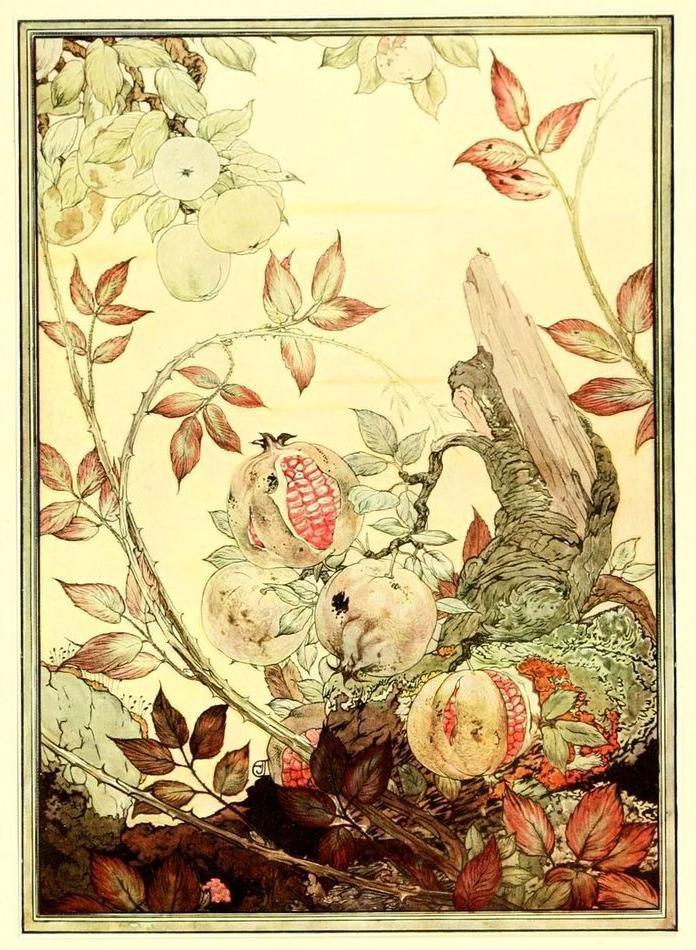
An illustration of the fable by E. J. Detmold in The Fables of Aesop (1909)

The Trees and the Bramble is a composite title which covers a number of fables of similar tendency, ultimately deriving from a Western Asian literary tradition of debate poems between two contenders. Other related plant fables include The Oak and the Reed and The Fir and the Bramble.

== The fables ==
One of Aesop's Fables, numbered 213 in the Perry Index, concerns a pomegranate and an apple tree debating which is the most beautiful. In the midst of it, a bramble bush in a nearby hedge appeals to them, 'Dear friends, let us put a stop to our quarrel.' The account is brief and leads to the humorous moral that 'when there is a dispute among sophisticated people, then riff-raff also try to act important'. The story was for a long time limited to Greek sources and, though versions of a similar debate between other trees gained some currency in the 16th and 17th centuries, it soon fell out of favour again. In 1564 the Neo-Latin poet Hieronymus Osius versified the story under the title "The Apple and the Pear", with the moral that the humble become overweening when the great fall out. Charles Hoole's influential Aesop's fables English and Latin (1657) included it under the title "Of the Peach-tree and the Apple-tree" with the moral that "meaner men do oftentimes settle the controversies of their betters", and is followed more or less by Roger L'Estrange, who concludes that "Every thing would be thought greater in the World than it is".

An idea of what such a debate would have been like is gained from a related poem of 116 lines by the Alexandrian poet Callimachus (Iamb 4), which is given the separate number of 439 in the Perry Index. There a laurel and an olive tree are in dispute concerning their relative importance and when a bramble attempts to bring peace it is rebuked by the furious laurel. It has been observed that the poem is in the tradition of poetical disputes of Sumerian origin that spread throughout the Near East. In the oldest form of these, the two in debate call for a judgment on which is superior from a presiding god.

An echo of that tradition, in which the trees instance their chief useful characteristics, is found in the earliest evidence of a fable among Jews occurring in the Hebrew Bible. The story is told to illustrate the folly of electing a ruler rather than relying on non-hereditary 'judges'. When the trees decide to seek a king, they offer the throne to the olive, the fig and the vine; each in turn refuses, preferring to keep to their own fruitful role. Only the bramble accepts, and makes threats of what will happen to those that do not accept him (Judges 9.8–15). The story began to be included in European fable collections in the Middle Ages. It also appears among Giovanni Maria Verdizotti's Cento favole morali (1570) and Robert Dodsley placed it at the start of his Select fables of Esop and other fabulists (1764) with the comment at the end that 'the most worthless persons are generally the most presumptuous'.

Dating from the time of Aesop in about 500 BCE, what appears to be an excerpt of an actual West Asian literary debate between a bramble and a pomegranate is inserted in the Aramaic story of Ahiqar that was only discovered at the start of the last century. There the bramble reproaches the pomegranate for the thorns that hinder people reaching its fruit in a display of pot calling the kettle black. But a commentator on the text remarks that its context in the midst of a discussion of the distinction between the bad and the just man gives it a new meaning. The pomegranate, bearing the fruits of righteousness, arms itself against those who would misuse them, for 'a man knows not what is in his fellow's heart. So when a good man sees a wicked man, let him not join with him on a journey or be a neighbour to him – a good man with a bad man. The bramble sent to the pomegranate tree saying, "What good is the multitude of thy thorns to him that toucheth thy fruit?" The pomegranate tree answered and said to the bramble, "Thou art all thorns to him that toucheth thee." All perish that assault the righteous man.'
