= Francisco Rodríguez Adrados =

Spanish linguist and philologist (1922–2020)

- Born: 29 March 1922; Salamanca, Spain
- Died: 21 July 2020 (aged 98); Madrid, Spain
- Education: University of Salamanca; Complutense University of Madrid
- Occupations: Linguist, translator, historian
- Years active: 1949–2020
- Known for: Hellenist studies and translations
- Awards: Premio Nacional de las Letras Españolas (2012)

Seat d of the Real Academia Española
- In office 28 April 1991 – 21 July 2020
- Preceded by: Dámaso Alonso
- Succeeded by: Dolores Corbella Díaz

Francisco Rodríguez Adrados (29 March 1922 – 21 July 2020) was a Spanish Hellenist, linguist and translator. He worked most of his career at the Complutense University of Madrid. He was a member of the Real Academia Española and Real Academia de la Historia.

== Life ==
Rodríguez Adrados was born on 29 March 1922 in Salamanca. He studied classical philology at the University of Salamanca, where he obtained a degree in 1944. He later obtained a doctorate in classical philology from the Complutense University of Madrid. Rodríguez Adrados became a teacher of Greek at the Instituto Cardenal Cisneros in Madrid in 1949. Two years later, he became a professor at the University of Barcelona and the next year, he moved to the Complutense University of Madrid, where he worked until his retirement. He worked as a translator of Ancient Greek and Sanskrit texts. He was considered to be an expert on Ancient Greek.

Rodríguez Adrados died on 21 July 2020 in Madrid, aged 98.

== Awards and honors ==
For his work on the Diccionario Griego-Español, Rodríguez Adrados received the Prize of the Aristotle Onassis Foundation in 1989.

He was elected to Seat d of the Real Academia Española on 21 June 1990, he took up his seat on 28 April 1991. Four years later he became a corresponding member of the Academia Argentina de Letras. He was elected a foreign member of the Academy of Athens in 2003.

Rodríguez Adrados was elected to medalla nº 3 of the Real Academia de la Historia on 23 May 2003 and took up his seat on 22 February 2004. In 2012, he won the Premio Nacional de las Letras Españolas. In 2014, he was awarded an honorary degree by the University of Panama.
