= Pantaleon Candidus =

Pantaleon Candidus was a theologian of the Reformed Church and a Neo-Latin author. He was born on 7 October 1540 in Ybbs an der Donau and died on 3 February 1608 in Zweibrücken.

== Life and works ==
Pantaleon Weiss was born the 14th child of a landowning family in Lower Austria. When he was 10 he was sent to be educated by Andreas Cupicius, a preacher with Protestant leanings, at Weissenkirchen, and served his teacher when he was imprisoned during the persecutions of that time. The two escaped to Hungary, from where Pantaleon returned to continue his education with Vitus Nuber, abbot of Seisenstein, whom he followed when his patron fled to Germany. There he came under the protection of Wolfgang, Count Palatine of Zweibrücken, from whom he received a scholarship to Wittenberg University, where he studied for seven years from 1558. It was during this time that he Latinised his name to Candidus under the influence of Philip Melanchthon.

Having served as secretary to the Humanist Hubert Languet, and also as a schoolmaster, he eventually ordained as a minister and, having served for a while outside the city, became church superintendent in Zweibrücken in 1571. Formerly the church there had been Lutheran, but following the death of Duke Wolfgang it turned to moderate Calvinism, with the support of Pantaleon.

As well as theological and historical works, he wrote much poetry, including the fable collection Centum et quinquaginta fabulae (1604). There the poems are grouped by subject and briefly paraphrase the story, ending with a moral reflection.
