= The Eagle Wounded by an Arrow =

Fable by Aesop

The situation of the Eagle Wounded by an Arrow vaned with its own feathers is referred to in several ancient Greek sources and is listed as fable 276 in the Perry Index. It is generally applied to the misery of realising that one has contributed to one's own injury but also as a warning against self-reliant pride.

== The fable and its interpretations ==
The earliest mention of the fable is a brief reference in The Myrmidons, a lost tragedy of Aeschylus written in the 5th century BCE. Here it is said to be of Libyan origin and is generally supposed to refer to the personal blame felt by Achilles for the death of his friend Patroclus.

So the eagle, pierced by the bow-sped shaft, looked
At the feathered device and said, "Thus, not by others,
But by means of our own plumage are we slain".

Widespread references to the fable afterwards suggest that it had gained proverbial force. A version titled "The Archer and the Eagle" and ascribed to Aesop appeared among the collection of fables by Babrius.

The fable did not appear in mediaeval collections of fables reliant on Latin sources but began to be noticed in Europe from the 16th century. In Guillaume La Perrière's Emblem book Le théatre des bons engins (The theatre of fine devices, 1544), there is an illustration of the wounded eagle accompanied by a verse commenting that its sorrow at being struck down is doubled by the knowledge that it has furnished the means for its own destruction. But when the situation appeared in La Fontaine's Fables, it was under the more generalised title of "The bird wounded by an arrow" (II.6) and a wider lesson is drawn from the incident. The dying bird blames humans for using its own parts against itself and claims that they have learnt this cruelty from the way they treat each other.

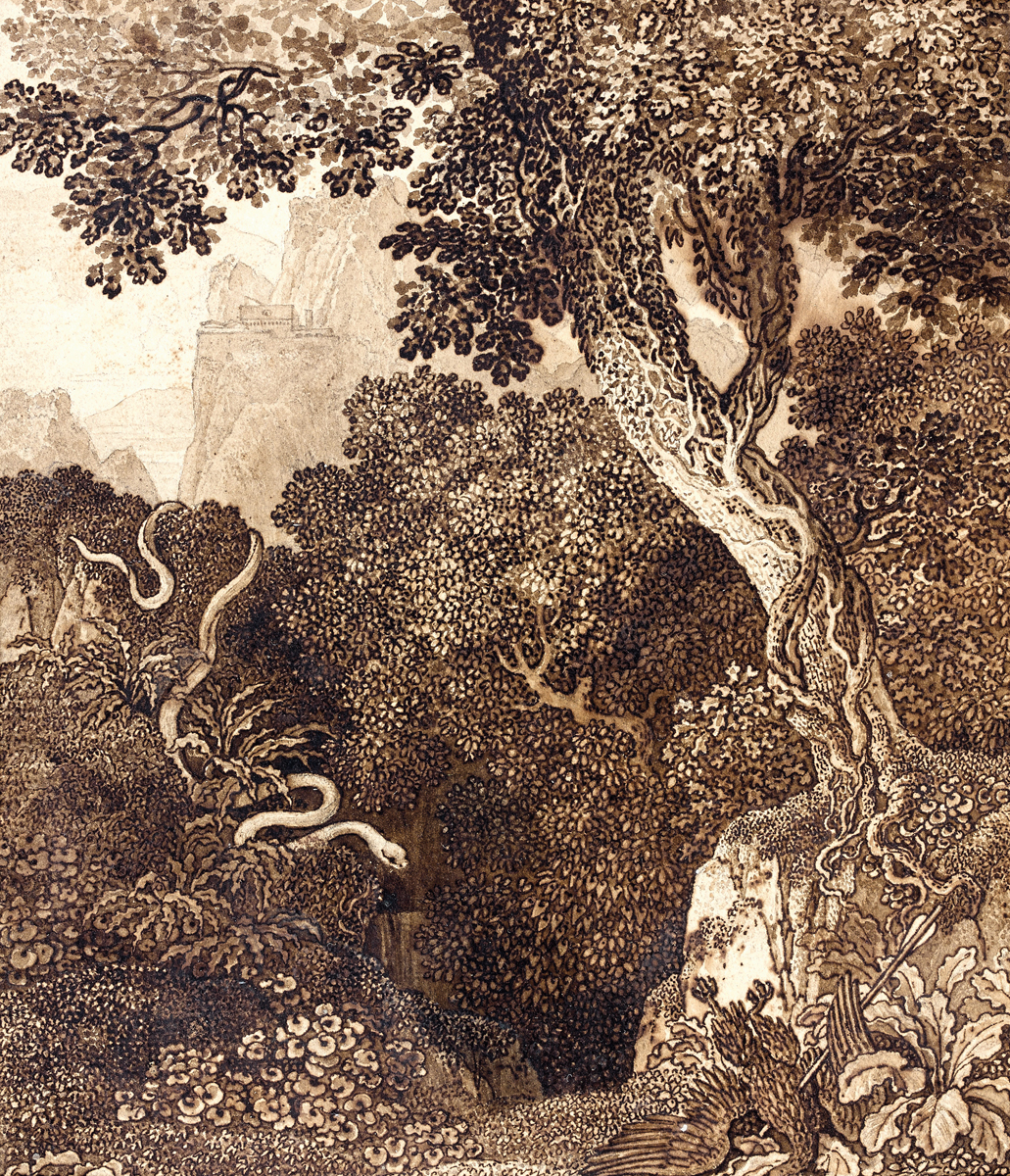
A savage landscape by Anne-Louis Girodet

A contemporary French emblem book took a different view of how the bird had contributed to its own hurt. Daniel de la Feuille's Devises et emblêmes (1691) starts from the perception that the bird in the poem was on the look-out for a hare. If another hunter brings it down while so engaged, then it is a case of poetic justice, of having inflicted on itself the harm it was purposing to inflict on others. Illustrated under the Latin title Capiens capior (the preyer become prey), it shows a sparrow hawk perched on a hare with an arrow through its own neck. There is also a coded reference to the fable in a mountain landscape by Anne-Louis Girodet dating from 1793/5. There an eagle pierced by an arrow lies at the foot of the picture, while towards it a huge snake is crawling across the rocks. Its writhing is echoed by the strangling ivy that climbs the tree beneath which the bird has fallen. Violence and cruelty is not limited to the human sphere; in the artist's eyes they are characteristic of nature as a whole.

The Greek origin of the fable was not lost sight of in France and Isaac de Benserade included L'aigle percé d'une flèche in his collection of Aesop's fables, recounting how it had allowed certain feathers to drop while grooming itself which were collected by the hunter who shot it. Pierre de Frasnay also provided a four-line poetic version in his Mythologie ou recueil des fables grecques, ésopiques et sybaritiques (Orléans 1750). The moral he drew from the story was that one should not be too self-reliant, for that too is an avenue that leads to harm.

Condemnation of pride was the interpretation given the fable when it travelled eastwards as well. In the 11th century Diwan (poetical works) of Nasir Khusraw, an eagle soars through the air, vaunting itself. When it is brought down by a hunter and recognises the feathers on the arrow, the realisation comes that it has been injured by its own means. Pieter de la Court was to give the story a similar interpretation in his Sinryke Fabulen (1685), making the point that those who thrust themselves into prominence become the mark for others to harm. The point is underlined by the Latin tag beneath the illustration of the injured bird, an adaptation of proverbial lines from the 4th century Latin poet Claudian: Vivitur exiguo melius, natura beatis / omnibus esse dedit, si quis cognoverit uti (it is better to live on little, [nature has provided for all to do so happily,] could one but know it).

Yet another fable of similar meaning is numbered 303 in the Perry Index. In it an oak (or a pine in another version) complains of being split by wedges made from its own branches. Commentaries on these fables point out that suffering is increased by the knowledge that it is one's own fault.

== Poetical allusions ==
The proverbial image of the wounded eagle was to become a common conceit in English poetry of the 17th century and after. Just as Aeschylus described his image as coming from Libya, James Howell identifies the 2nd century writer Lucian as his source in a commendatory poem on the work of Giles Fletcher:

England, like Lucian's eagle with an arrow
Of her own plumes, piercing her heart quite thorow.

As he does so, he is also echoing the same conceit used in Fletcher's poem "Christ's Victory in Heaven".

Two poets identified with the Cavalier cause also used the conceit. Katherine Philips placed it at the start of her poem "On Controversies in Religion" (1667), arguing that religion becomes the victim of misapplied texts

And meets that Eagles destiny, whose breast
Felt the same shaft which his own feathers drest.

Edmund Waller, on the other hand, turned the image to Baroque hyperbole by making himself the victim of "A Lady singing a Song of his Composing".

The image was still current at the start of the 19th century. Lord Byron used it in the course of lamenting the early death of Henry Kirke White while still a student. At more or less the same time, Thomas Moore applied it in his early political poem "Corruption" (1808).

== Artistic use ==
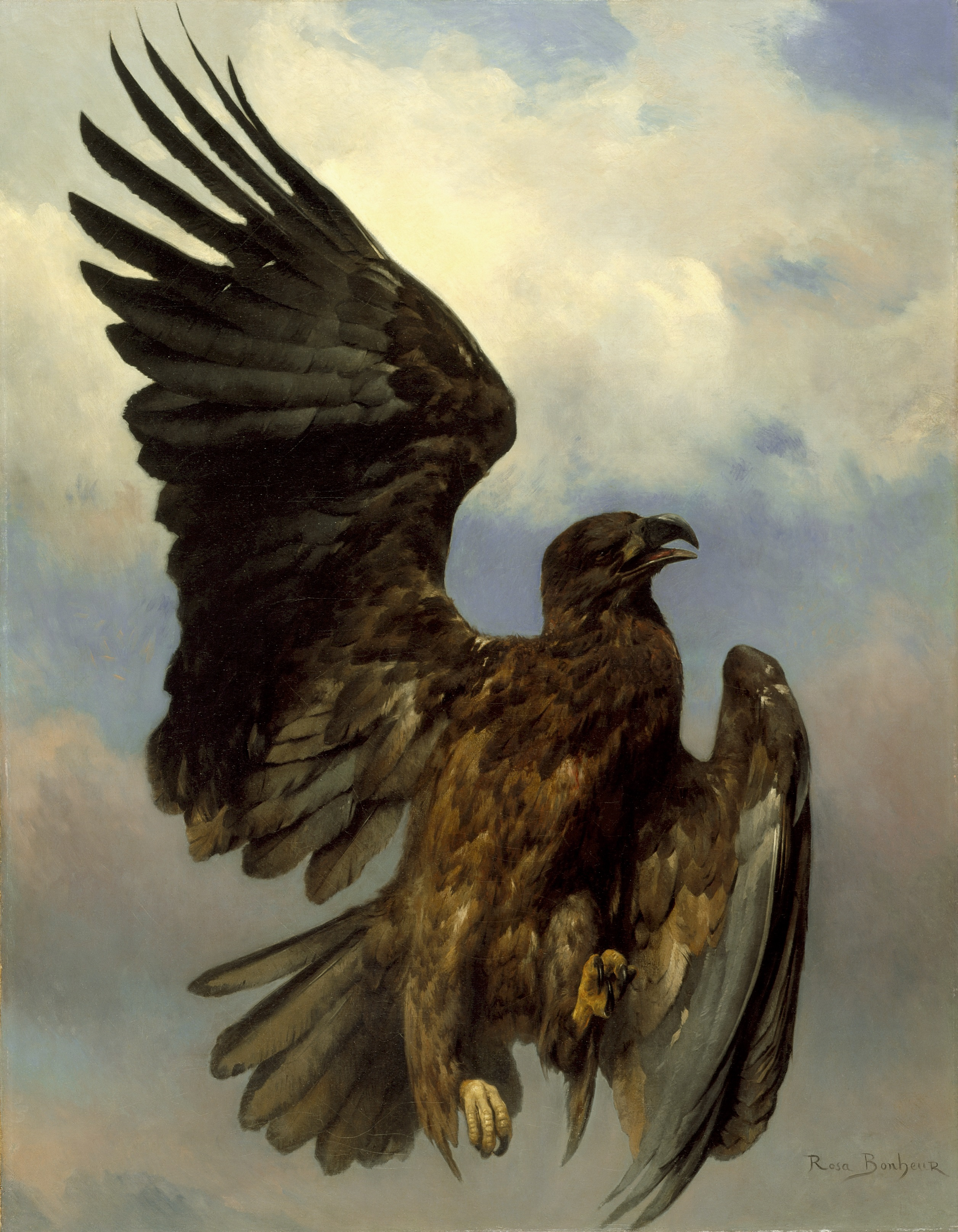
Rosa Bonheur's The Wounded Eagle c.1870, LACMA

La Fontaine's version of the fable was illustrated by woodcuts in various editions over the centuries, usually by nothing more original than a picture of a bird lying on the ground with an arrow piercing its neck or breast. One or other of these served as model for the left-hand page of Kawanabe Kyosui's coloured woodcut in the collectors edition Choix de Fables de La Fontaine published from Tokyo in 1894 with illustrations by Japanese artists. What brings the composition to life is the depiction of the bowman crouching on the bushy shore on the right-hand page.

Marc Chagall also included a distant bowman in his coloured print of 1927 but gives greater prominence to the death agonies of the wounded bird, which is echoed by the waving foliage in the background. André Masson's L'oiseau percé de flèches (1925) equally gives a sense of painful movement. In this Cubist work, the stricken bird inclines diagonally across a stylised rocky background and still aspires upwards.

The painting by Rosa Bonheur of a wounded eagle in mid-air (c. 1870) is not generally referred to the original Greek fable and no arrow is shown there. Instead, it is the eagle's political symbolism on which critics comment, interpreting the work as referring both to the defeat of Napoleon III in the Franco-Prussian War and to the injury to the Prussian state of its aggression. Nevertheless, the theme of harm brought by its own agency is available as an alternative reading.

Among musical settings of La Fontaine's fable are Heitor Villa-Lobos' for voice and piano (1913), and that of Marcelle de Manziarly as the second of her Trois Fables de La Fontaine (1935). In addition, it was Marianne Moore's poetical versions that were used in Ned Rorem's Fables (1971) as the basis of his 'very short operas', of which "The bird wounded by an arrow" is placed third. More recently it featured as the third piece in Vladimir Cosma's Eh bien ! Dansez maintenant (2006), a light-hearted interpretation for narrator and orchestra in the style of a funeral march.
