= Kanagaki Robun =

Japanese journalist and writer (1829–1894)

- 仮名垣 魯文
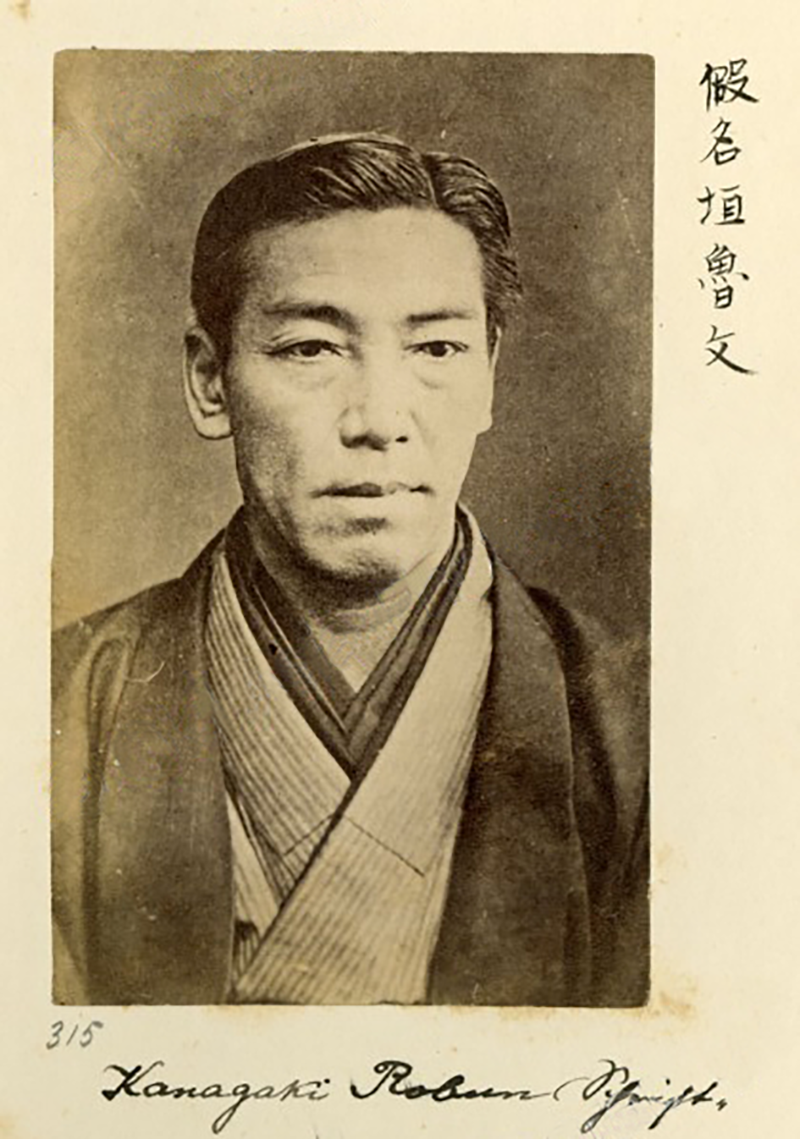
- Born: 9 February 1829; Edo, Musashi Province, Japan
- Died: 8 November 1894 (aged 65); Tokyo, Tokyo Prefecture, Japan
- Other name: Nozaki Bunzō (野崎 文蔵)
- Education: Hanagasa Bunkyō (master)
- Occupations: Journalist, writer, novelist
- Employer(s): Worked for Kanagawa Prefectural Government, Yokohama Mainichi Shimbun

Kanagaki Robun (仮名垣 魯文) was the pen name of Nozaki Bunzō (野崎 文蔵) (9 February 1829 – 8 November 1894), a Japanese author and journalist.

== Career ==
Kanagaki Robun, the son of a fishmonger, was originally known for light fiction in the gesaku genre. He is said to have met painter Kawanabe Kyosai while writing an account of the 1855 Edo earthquake on the day after it happened. Kyosai's sketch of a catfish, accompanying Robun's text, was Kyosai's first single-sheet ukiyo-e woodblock print. Its commercial success saw Robun producing a sequence of catfish pictures (known as namazu-e). In 1874 the pair collaborated to create what was effectively Japan's first manga magazine, Eshinbun nipponchi (Illustrated News).

In 1874 Robun turned to journalism, joining the Yokohama mainichi shinbun and going on in 1875 to found his own newspaper, the Kana-yomi shinbun (Kana Newspaper). His newspaper pioneered the genre of "dokufu-mono," criminal biographies of female outlaws, and Kanagaki Robun's own Tale of Takahashi Oden the She-Devil (written rapidly after Takahashi Oden was beheaded for killing a man) is the most famous example of the genre.

He also wrote illustrated biographies, including an adapted biography of Ulysses S. Grant published for Grant's 1879 visit to Japan.

== Works ==
- Collected Rumors of Ansei (安政風聞集, Ansei fūbunshū) (1856)
- Account of the Ansei Cholera Epidemic (安政頃痢流行記, Ansei korori ryūkōki) (1856)
- Journey on Foot to the Western Sea (西洋道中膝栗毛, Seiyōdōchū hizakurige) (1870–76), a parody of Jippensha Ikku's Tōkaidōchū Hizakurige
- The Beefeater (安愚楽鍋, Aguranabe) (1871)
- The Cucumber Messenger (胡瓜遣, Kyurisukai) (1872)
- Connoisseur of Western-Style Cuisine (西洋料理通, Seiyō ryōritsu) (1872)
- Chronicle of the Saga Telegraph Line (佐賀電信録, Saga denshinroku) (1874)
- The Tale of Takahashi Oden, the She-Devil (高橋阿伝夜叉譚, Takahashi Oden yasha tan) (1879)
- A Japanese Print of Hamlet (葉武列土倭錦絵, Hamuretto Yamato nishikie) (1886)
