= Belling the Cat =

Medieval fable attributed to Aesop

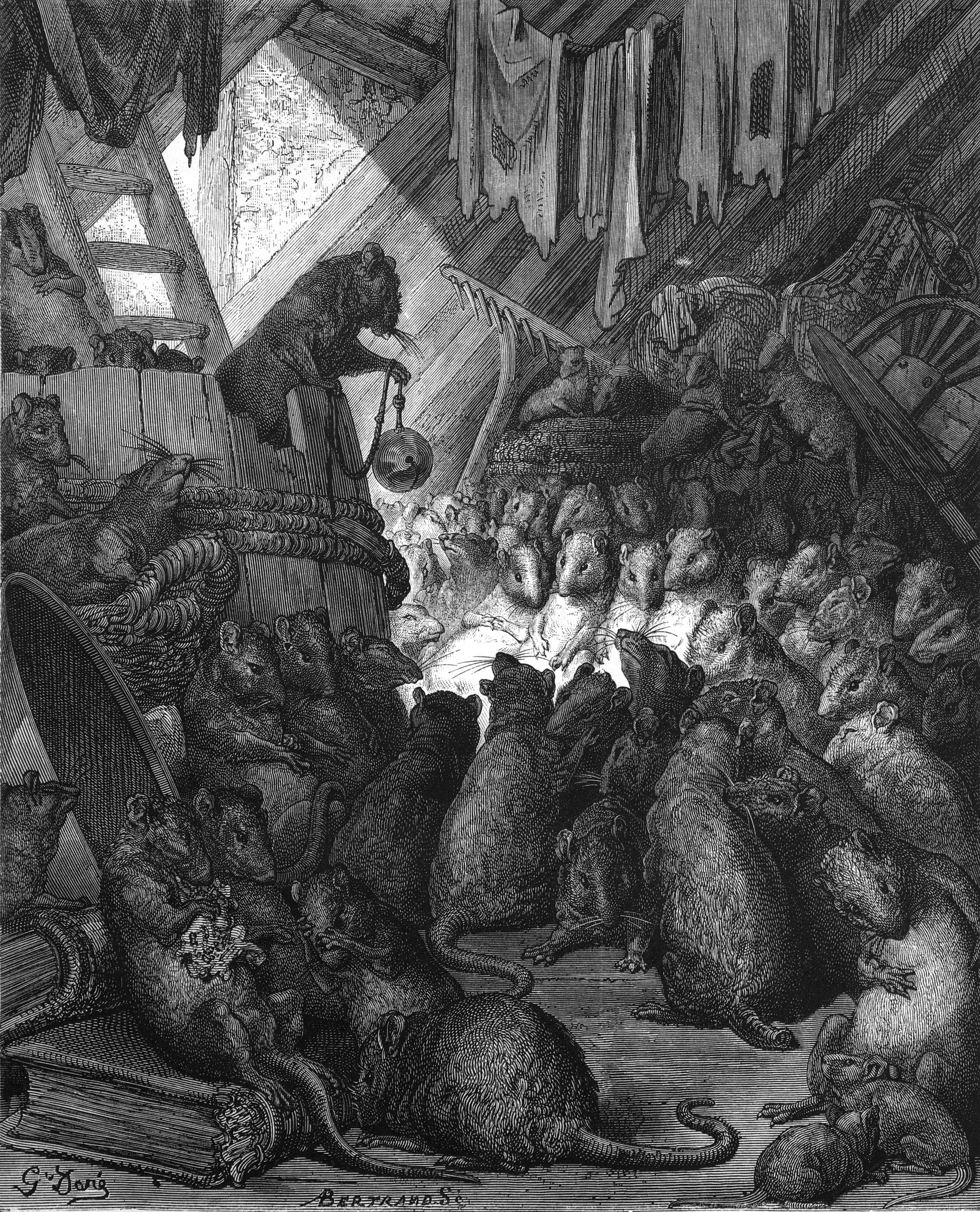
Gustave Doré's illustration of La Fontaine's fable, c. 1868

Belling the Cat is a fable also known under the titles The Bell and the Cat and The Mice in Council. In the story, a group of mice agree to attach a bell to a cat's neck to warn of its approach in the future, but they fail to find a volunteer to perform the job. The term has become an idiom describing a group of persons, each agreeing to perform an impossibly difficult task under the misapprehension that someone else will be chosen to run the risks and endure the hardship of actual accomplishment.

Although often attributed to Aesop, it was not recorded before the Middle Ages and has been confused with the quite different fable of Classical origin titled The Cat and the Mice. In the classificatory system established for the fables by Ben Edwin Perry, it is numbered 613, which is reserved for Mediaeval attributions outside the Aesopic canon.

== Synopsis and idiomatic use ==
The fable concerns a group of mice who debate plans to nullify the threat of a marauding cat. One of them proposes placing a bell around its neck, so that they are warned of its approach. The plan is applauded by the others, until one mouse asks who will volunteer to place the bell on the cat. All of them make excuses. The story is used to teach the wisdom of evaluating a plan on not only how desirable the outcome would be but also how it can be executed. It provides a moral lesson about the fundamental difference between ideas and their feasibility, and how this affects the value of a given plan.

The fable gives rise to the idiom to bell the cat, which means to attempt, or agree to perform, an impossibly difficult task. Historically 'Bell the Cat' is frequently claimed to have been a nickname given to fifteenth-century Scottish nobleman Archibald Douglas, 5th Earl of Angus in recognition of his part in the arrest and execution of James III's alleged favourite, Thomas (often misnamed as Robert) Cochrane. In fact the earliest evidence for this use is from Hume of Godscroft's history of the Douglases published in 1644, and therefore is more reflective of perception of the idiom in the seventeenth century than the fifteenth. In the 21st century the idiom was adopted by the investigative journalism group Bellingcat.

The first English collection to attribute the fable to Aesop was John Ogilby's of 1687; in this there is a woodcut (by Francis Barlow), followed by a 10-line verse synopsis by Aphra Behn with the punning conclusion:

Good Councell's easily given, but the effect
Oft renders it uneasy to transact.

== Early versions and later interpretations ==
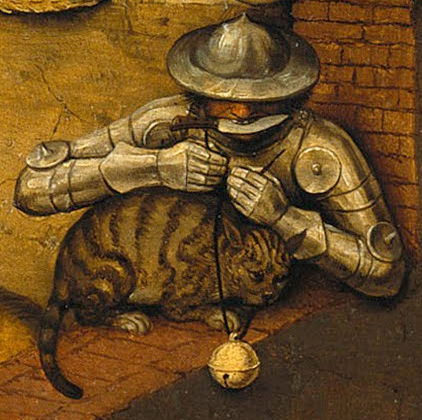
"Belling the cat" is one of the proverbs illustrated in Pieter Bruegel I's painting Netherlandish Proverbs (1559).

One of the earliest versions of the story appears as a parable critical of the clergy in Odo of Cheriton's Parabolae. Written around 1200, it was afterwards translated into Welsh, French and Spanish. Sometime later, the story is found in the work now referred to as Ysopet-Avionnet, which is largely made up of Latin poems by the 12th century Walter of England, followed by a French version dating from as much as two centuries later. It also includes four poems not found in Walter's Esopus; among them is the tale of "The Council of the Mice" (De muribus consilium facientibus contra catum). The author concludes with the scornful comment that laws are of no effect without the means of adequately enforcing them and that such parliamentary assemblies as he describes are like the proverbial mountain in labour that gives birth to a mouse.

The fable also appeared as a cautionary tale in Nicholas Bozon's Anglo-Norman Contes Moralisés (1320), referring to the difficulty of curbing the outrages of superior lords. It was in this context too that the story of a parliament of rats and mice was retold in William Langland's allegorical poem Piers Plowman. The episode is said to refer to the Parliament of 1376 which attempted unsuccessfully to remedy popular dissatisfaction over the exactions made by nobles acting in the royal name. Langland's French contemporary, the satirical Eustache Deschamps, also includes the story among his other moral ballades based on fables as "Les souris et les chats". It has been suggested that in this case too there is a political subtext. The poem was written as a response to the aborted invasion of England in 1386 and contrasts French dithering in the face of English aggression. The refrain of Deschamps' ballade, Qui pendra la sonnette au chat (who will bell the cat) was to become proverbial in France if, indeed, it does not record one already existing.

In the following century, the Italian author Laurentius Abstemius made of the fable a Latin cautionary tale titled De muribus tintinnabulum feli appendere volentibus (The mice who wanted to bell the cat) in 1499. A more popular version in Latin verse was written by Gabriele Faerno and printed posthumously in his Fabulae centum ex antiquis auctoribus delectae (100 delightful fables from ancient authors, Rome 1564), a work that was to be many times reprinted and translated up to start of the 19th century. Titled simply "The Council of the Mice", it comes to rest on the drily stated moral that 'a risky plan can have no good result'. The story was evidently known in Flanders too, since 'belling the cat' was included among the forty Netherlandish Proverbs in the composite painting of Pieter Bruegel the Elder (1559). In this case a man in armour is performing the task in the lower left foreground. A century later, La Fontaine's Fables made the tale even better known under the title Conseil tenu par les rats (II.2).

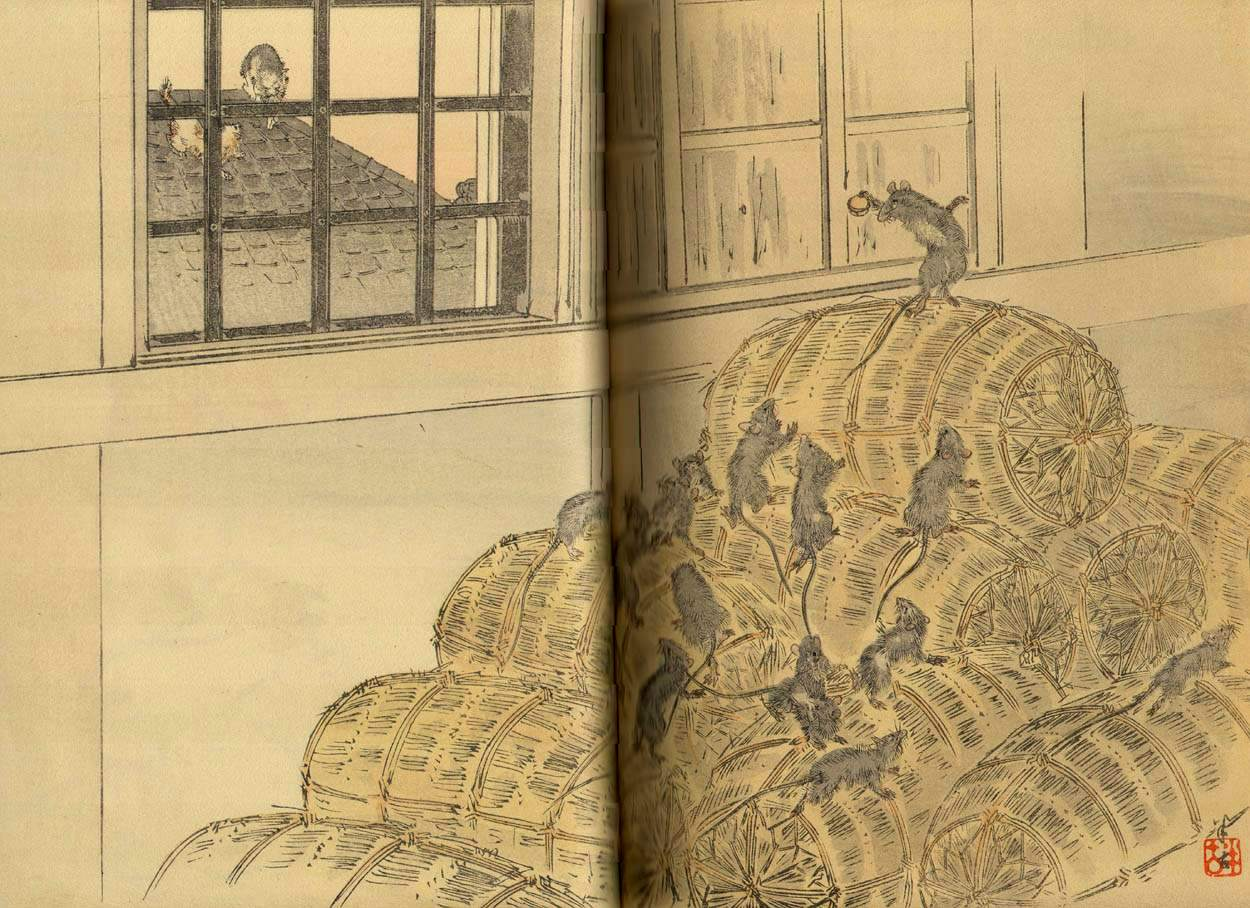
A Japanese woodblock illustration by Kawanabe Kyōsai of La Fontaine's fable, 1894.

In mediaeval times the fable was applied to political situations and British commentaries on it were sharply critical of the limited democratic processes of the day and their ability to resolve social conflict when class interests were at stake. This applies equally to the plot against the king's favourite in 15th century Scotland and the direct means that Archibald Douglas chose to resolve the issue. While none of the authors who used the fable actually incited revolution, the 1376 Parliament that Langland satirised was followed by Wat Tyler's revolt five years later, while Archibald Douglas went on to lead a rebellion against King James. During the Renaissance the fangs of the fable were being drawn by European authors, who restricted their criticism to pusillanimous conduct in the face of rashly proposed solutions. A later exception was the Russian fabulist Ivan Krylov, whose adaptation of the story satirises croneyism. In his account only those with perfect tails are to be allowed into the assembly; nevertheless, a tailless rat is admitted because of a family connection with one of the lawmakers.

There still remains the perception of a fundamental opposition between consensus and individualism. This is addressed in the lyrics of "Bell the Cat", a performance put out on DVD by the Japanese rock band LM.C in 2007. This is the monologue of a house cat that wants to walk alone since "Society is by nature evil". It therefore refuses to conform and is impatient of restriction: "your hands hold on to everything – bell the cat". While the lyric is sung in Japanese, the final phrase is in English. Another modernised adaptation based on this fable, that updates the moral, has been published by Patricia McKissack in her Who Will Bell the Cat? (illustrated by Christopher Cyr).

There is a Tibetan proverb that is very similar, "Putting a bell on the cat's neck after the mother of mice was consulted"

== Illustrations ==
Several French artists depicted the fable during the 19th century, generally choosing one of two approaches. Gustave Doré and the genre painter Aurélie Léontine Malbet (fl. 1868–1906) pictured the rats realistically acting out their debate. The illustrator Grandville, along with the contemporaries Philibert Léon Couturier (1823–1901) and Auguste Delierre (1829–1890), caricature the backward practice and pomposity of provincial legislatures, making much the same point as did the Mediaeval authors who first recorded the tale. At the end of the century a publishing curiosity reverts to the first approach. This was in the woodblock print by Kawanabe Kyōsui that appeared in the collection of La Fontaine's fables that was commissioned and printed in Tokyo in 1894 and then exported to France. In the upper left-hand corner a cat is seen through a warehouse window as it approaches across the roofs while inside the rats swarm up the straw-wrapped bales of goods. At its summit the chief rat holds the bell aloft. An earlier Japanese woodblock formed part of Kawanabe Kyōsai's Isoho Monogotari series (1870–80). This shows an assembly of mice in Japanese dress with the proposer in the foreground, brandishing the belled collar.

== Musical settings ==
In the 18th century the fable was one among many set by Louis-Nicolas Clérambault in the fables section of Nouvelles poésies spirituelles et morales sur les plus beaux airs (1730–37). In the following century the text of La Fontaine's fable was set for male voices by Louis Lacombe and by the Catalan composer Isaac Albéniz for medium voice and piano in 1889. In 1950 it was set for four male voices by Florent Schmitt. But while La Fontaine's humorously named cat Rodilardus, and antiquated words like discomfiture (déconfiture), may fit an art song, there have also been faithful interpretations in the field of light music. A popular composer of the day, Prosper Massé, published such a setting in 1846. More recently there has been Pierre Perret's interpretation as part of his 20 Fables inspirées de Jean de la Fontaine (1995), and a jazz arrangement on Daniel Roca's 10 Fables de La Fontaine (2005).

== See also ==
- Collective action problem
- Who Will Bell the Cat?, a children's picture book based on the fable
