= Who Will Bell the Cat? =

Children's picture book by Patricia McKissack and illustrated by Christopher Cyr

- Front cover
- Author: Patricia McKissack
- Illustrator: Christopher Cyr
- Cover artist: Christopher Cyr
- Language: English
- Genre: Children's picture book
- Published: 2018 (Holiday House, New York)
- Publication place: USA
- Media type: Print (hardback)
- Pages: 40 (unpaginated)
- ISBN: 9780823437009
- OCLC: 1037155724

Who Will Bell the Cat? is a 2018 children's picture book by Patricia McKissack. Based on the fable Belling the Cat, it was published by Holiday House and is illustrated by Christopher Cyr. It concerns a group of mice who nurse back to health an ungrateful terrifying cat called Marmalade, make a bell and collar warning device, and how they manage to collar the cat with it.

== Reception ==
A review in Publishers Weekly of Who Will Bell the Cat? wrote "Lush, cinematic illustrations add drama to the late McKissack’s retelling of Aesop’s classic fable." and Kirkus Reviews, in a starred review, compared it to The Rescuers.

Who Will Bell the Cat? has also been reviewed by Booklist, School Library Journal. The Horn Book Magazine, and BookPage.

It is a 2018 Kirkus Reviews Best Picture Book, and a 2018 Chicago Tribune Best Children's Book of the Year.
