= Hell Courtesan =

Japanese legendary figure

Hell Courtesan (Japanese: 地獄太夫, romanized: Jigoku Tayū) is a legendary figure originating in Edo Japanese folklore. The Hell Courtesan has been portrayed multiple times in ukiyo-e.

== Legend ==
The Hell Courtesan is usually depicted in a dress with the images of hell, Enma-Ō (one of the kings of hell), horned demons, and bodhisattvas. Kawanabe Kyōsai is depicted on her dress, or sometimes "Hotei (one of the Seven Gods of Good Fortune) in the guise of Jizō, the guardian of children, travelers, and the underworld. Other depictions include karako (a Chinese child motif that represents prosperity of the family and its posterity), in which the children stack jewels.

The legend was about a beautiful courtesan, a daughter of a samurai, who was "kidnapped by his enemies and was sold to a brothel". She started to call herself "Hell Courtesan" after an encounter with a Buddhist monk, Ikkyu Sojun, who was known for his taste for sake and prostitutes. According to the story, Ikkyū met the Hell Courtesan during one of his visits to the pleasure district. Santō Kyōden's book from 1809, All Records of Drunken Enlightenment of Our Country, tells that she "found him dancing with a bunch of skeletons instead of being entertained by dancers and geisha. It occurred to her that he may not be an ordinary human being." She then became his disciple and achieved enlightenment. The story first appeared in 1672, in the anonymously written book Ikkyū kantō banashi.

Tayū was the highest rank of a courtesan, and Jigoku means not only hell, but the homonym also meant "the lowest streetwalker prostitute in the Edo period".

== Gallery ==
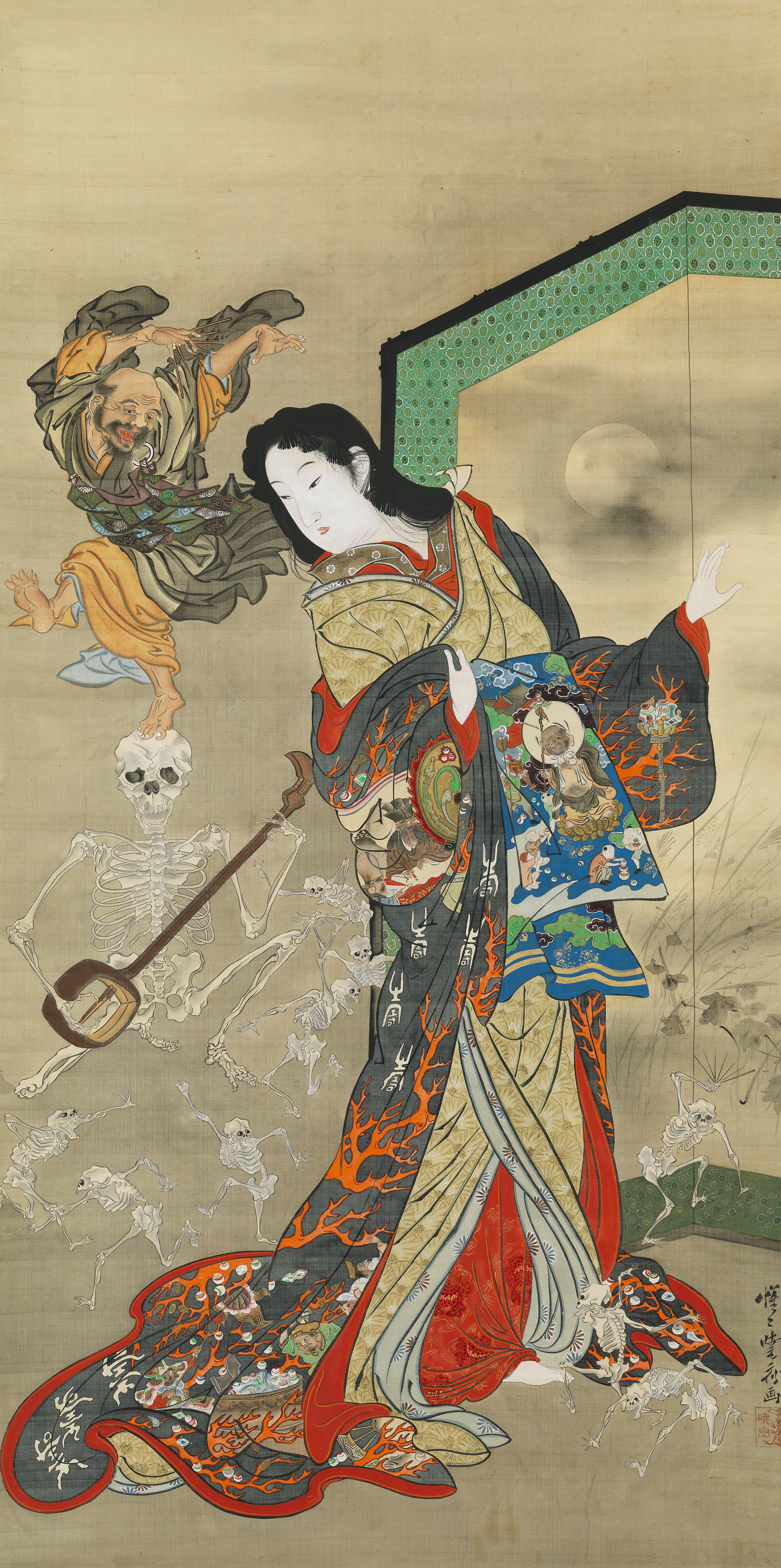
Kawanabe Kyōsai, Hell Courtesan, Ikkyu, and Skeletons, 1880.

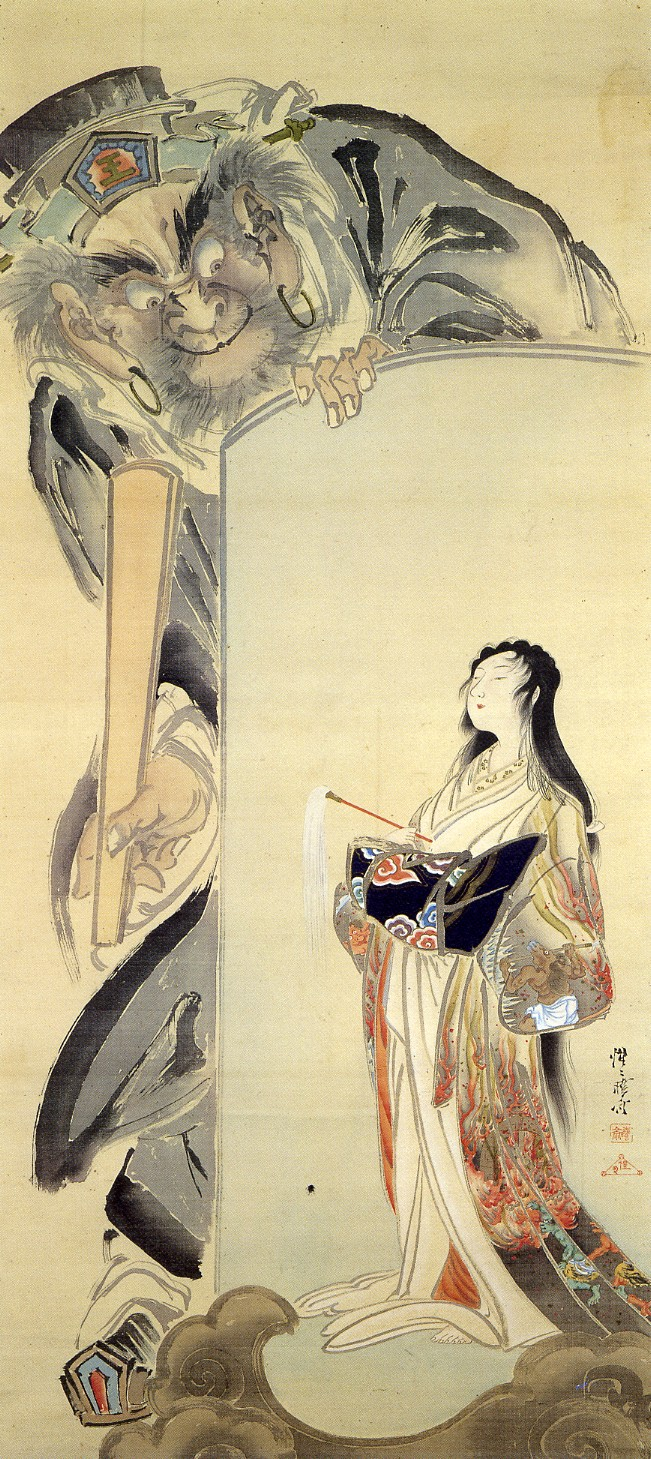
Kawanabe Kyōsai, "Emma and the Hell Courtesan"

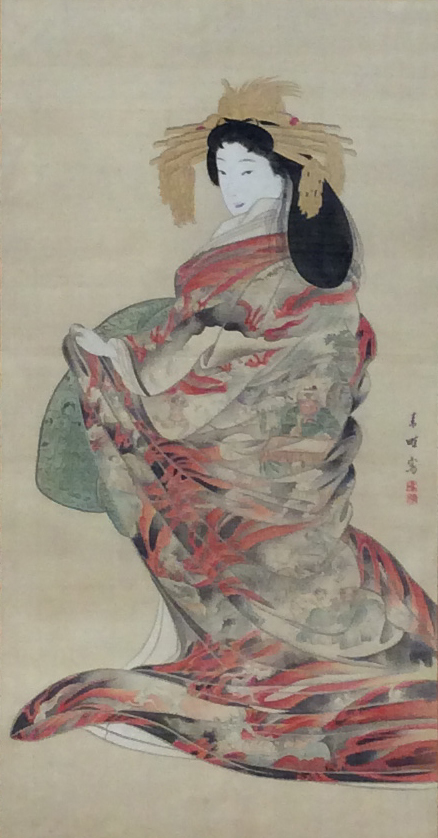
Unknown author, The Hell Courtesan

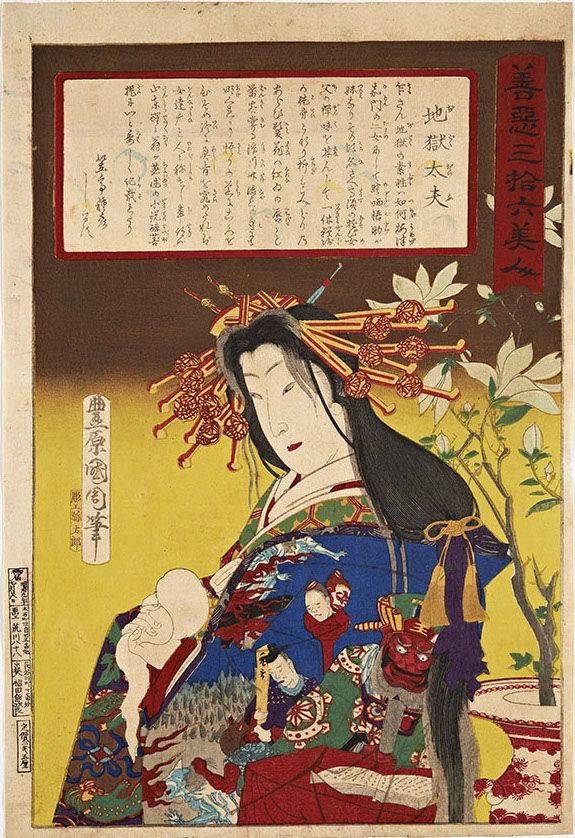
Toyohara Kunichika, Thirty-six Good and Evil Beauties: Jigoku Dayu

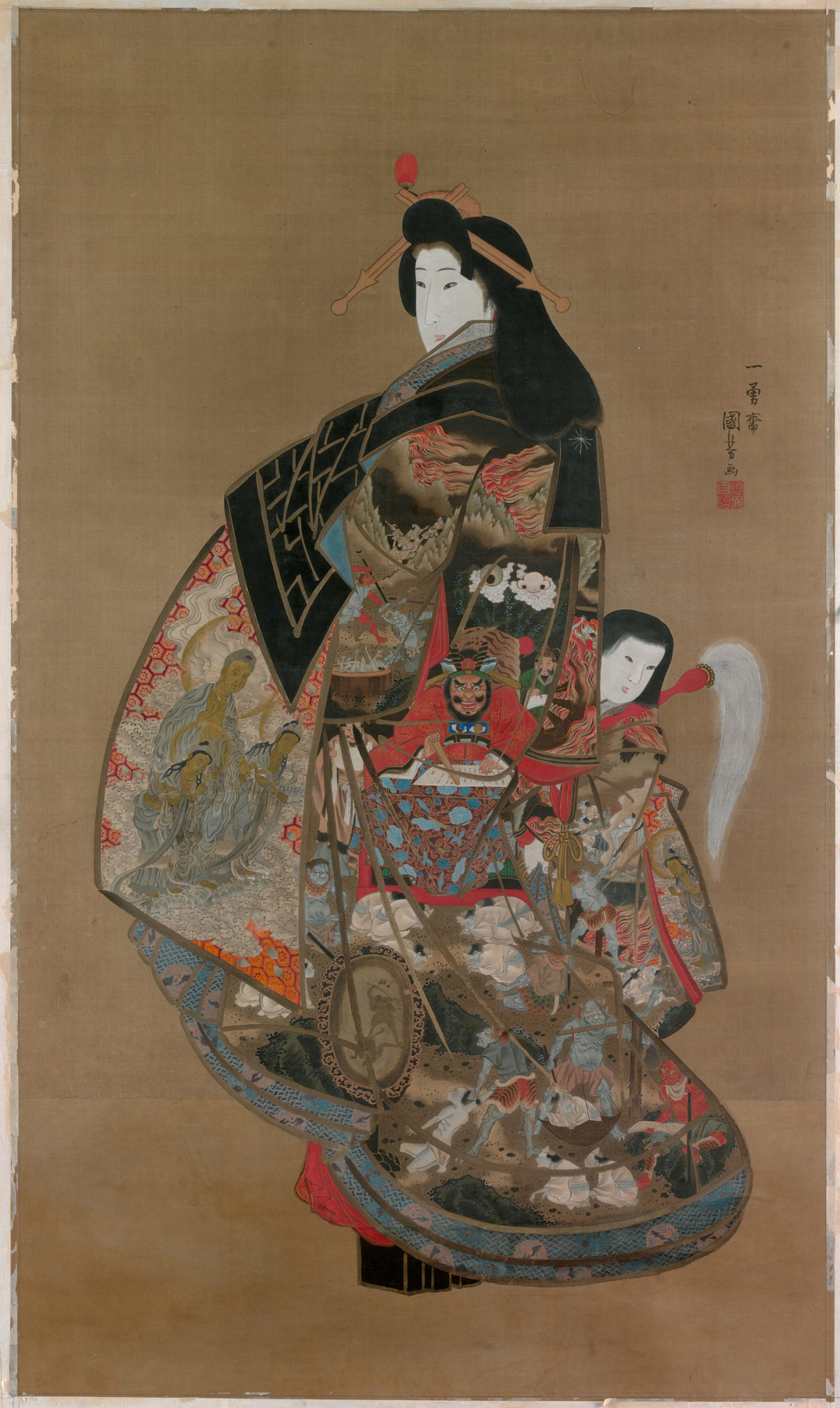
Utagawa Kuniyoshi

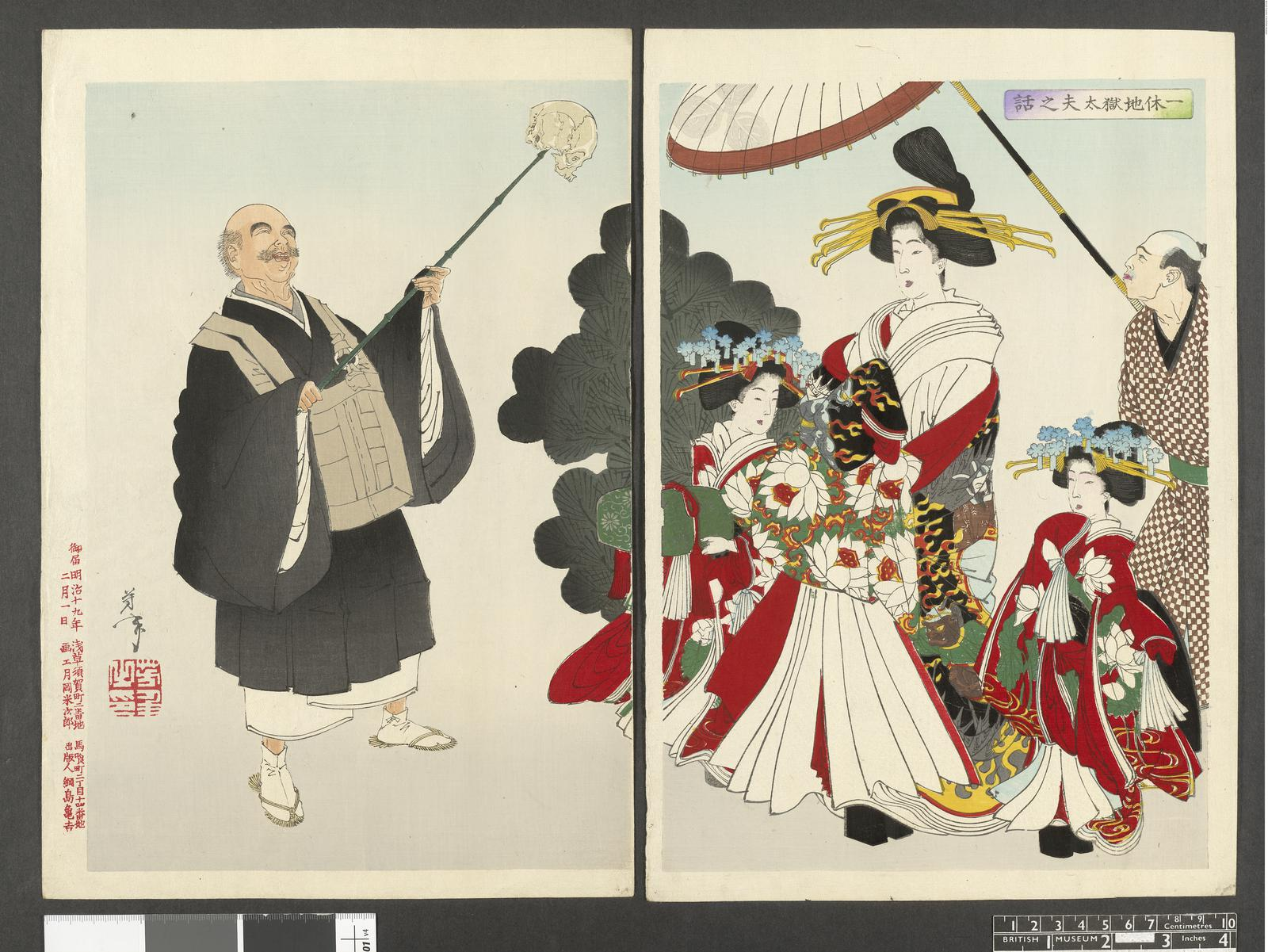
Tsukioka Yoshitoshi, The Buddhist monk Ikkyu holding a skull before the courtesan Jigoku-dayu

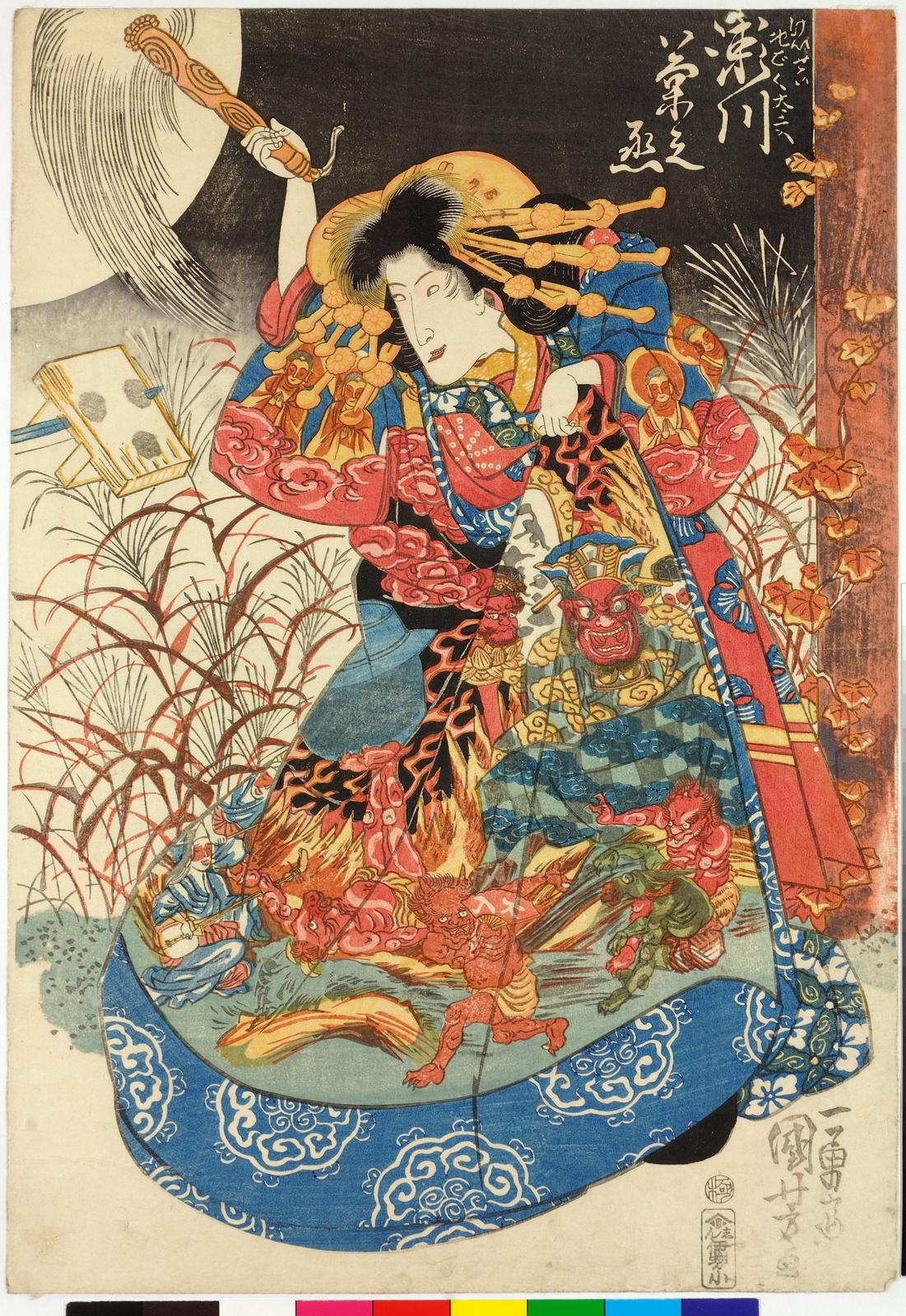
Utagawa Kuniyoshi, Scene from a kabuki play. The kabuki actor Nakamura Shikan (Utaemon IV) as Ikkyu Taro (left) holding down an opponent, extends his sword towards Segawa Kikunojo (right) as the courtesan, Jigoku-dayu

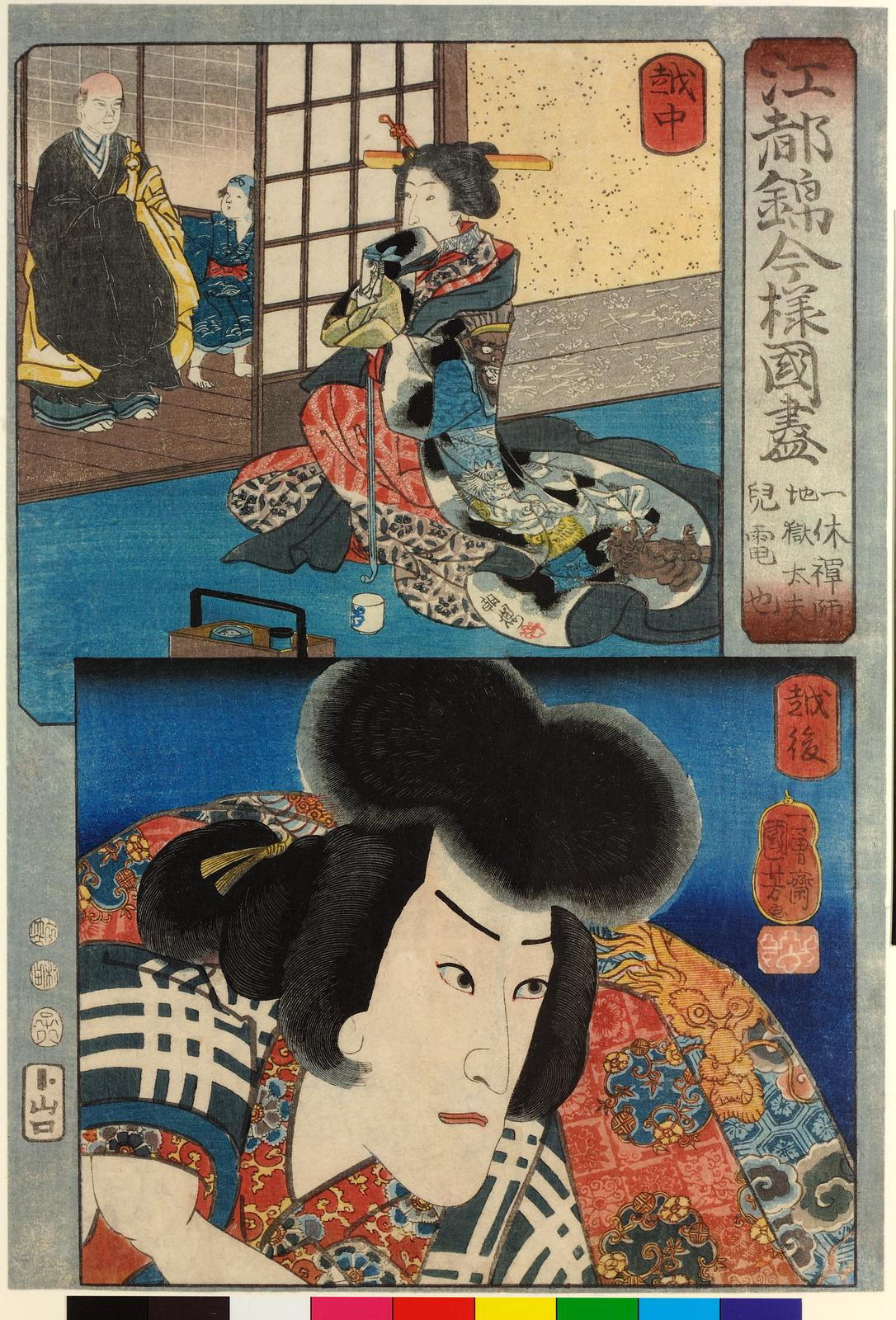
Utagawa Kuniyoshi, Top: Ecchu Province: the Zen monk Ikkyu Zenji with a young attendant and the courtesan Jigoku Dayu kneeling outside.

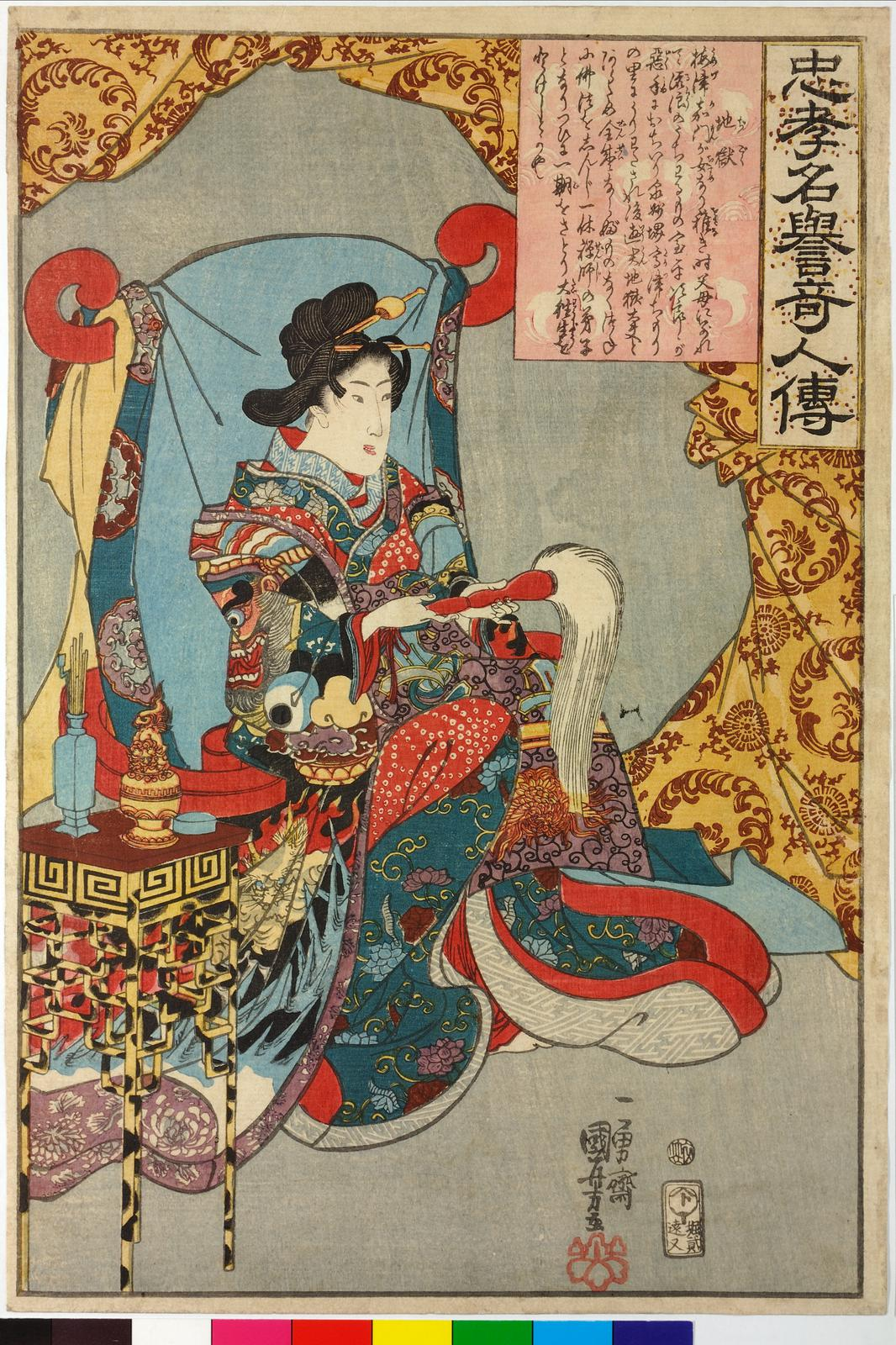
Utagawa Kuniyoshi, The courtesan Jigoku-dayu seated on a throne, holding a Buddhist fly-whisk

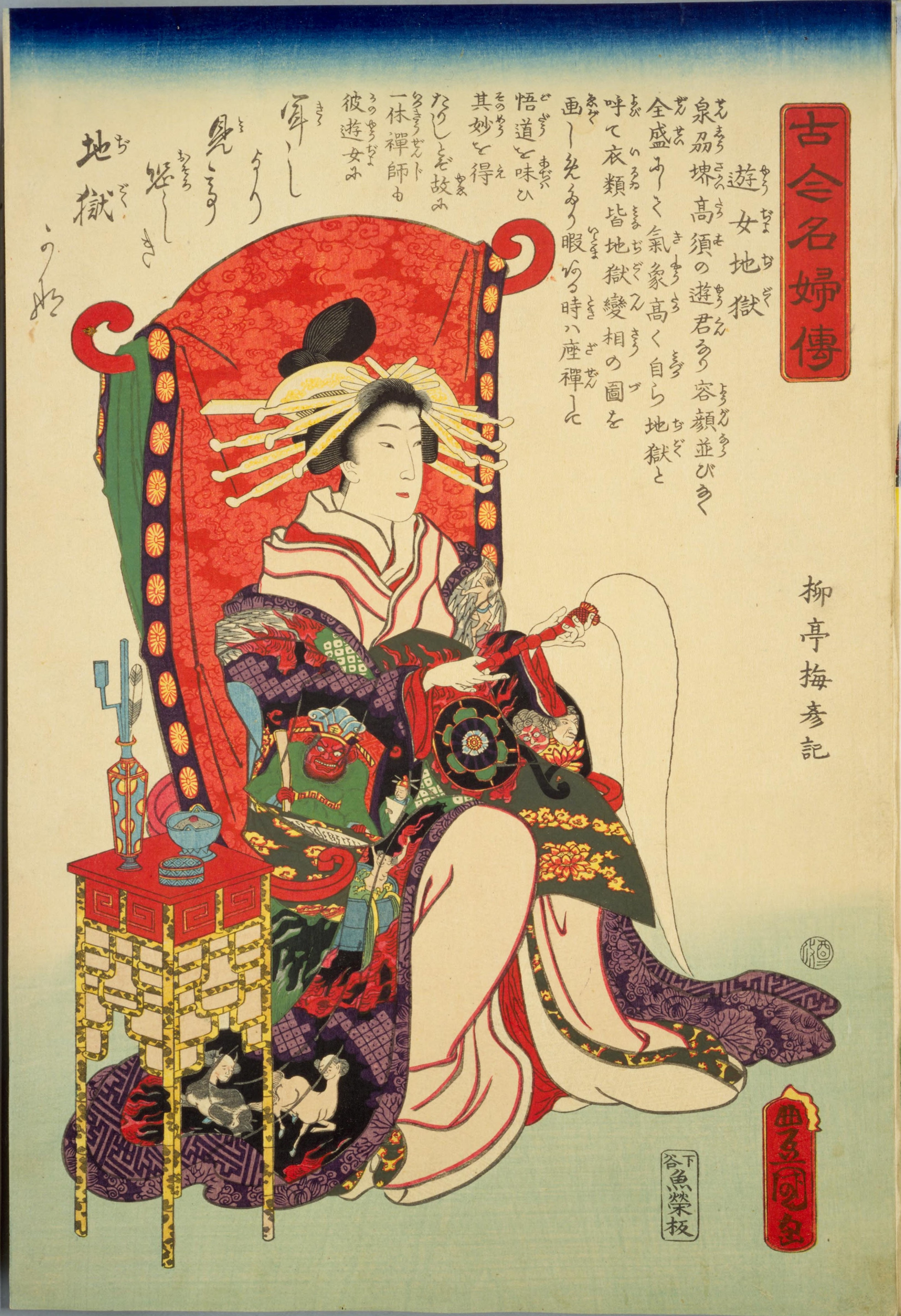
Utagawa Kunisada, from the picture album "Toyokuni Nishiki-e shu"

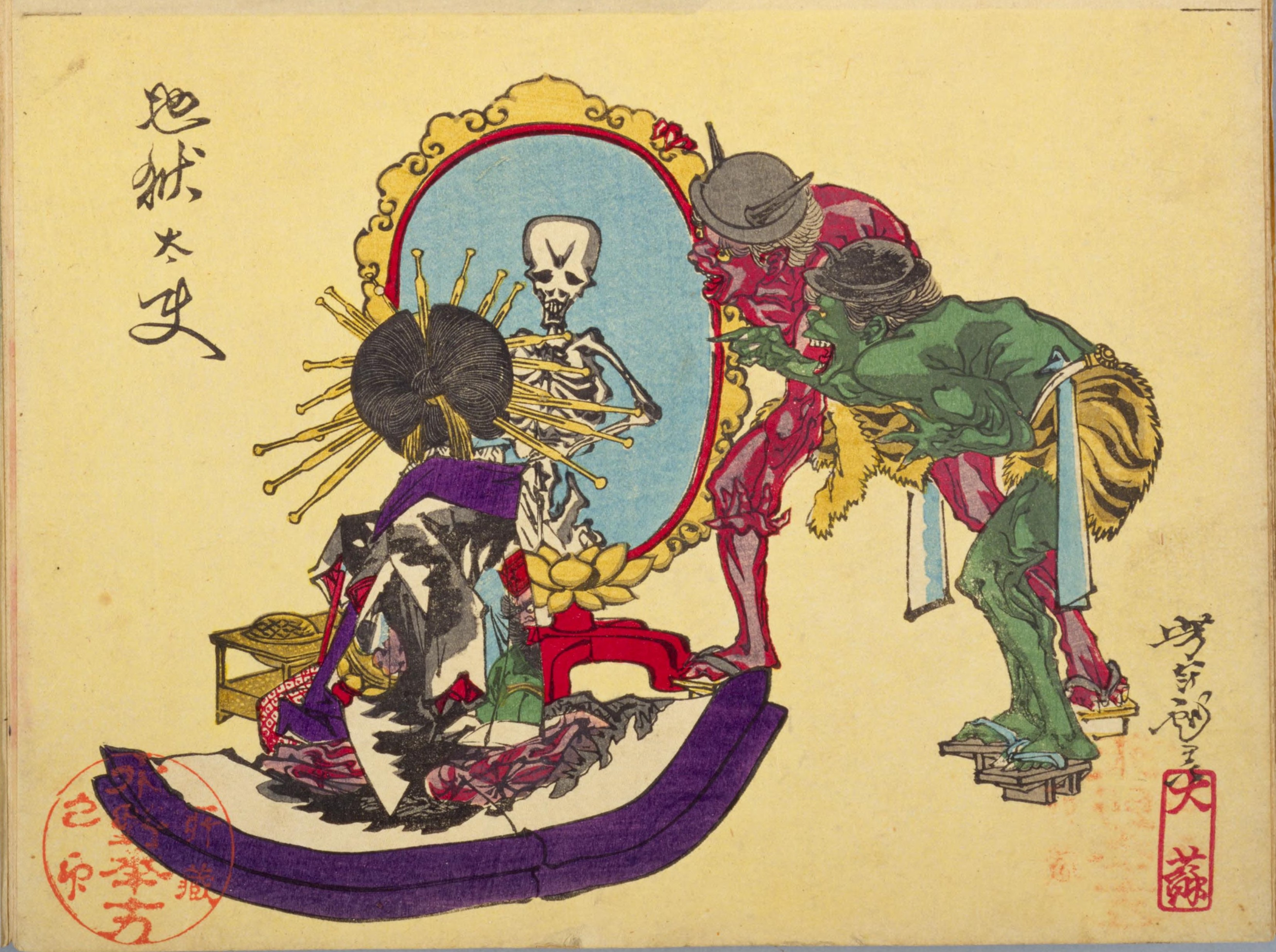
Tsukioka Yoshitoshi

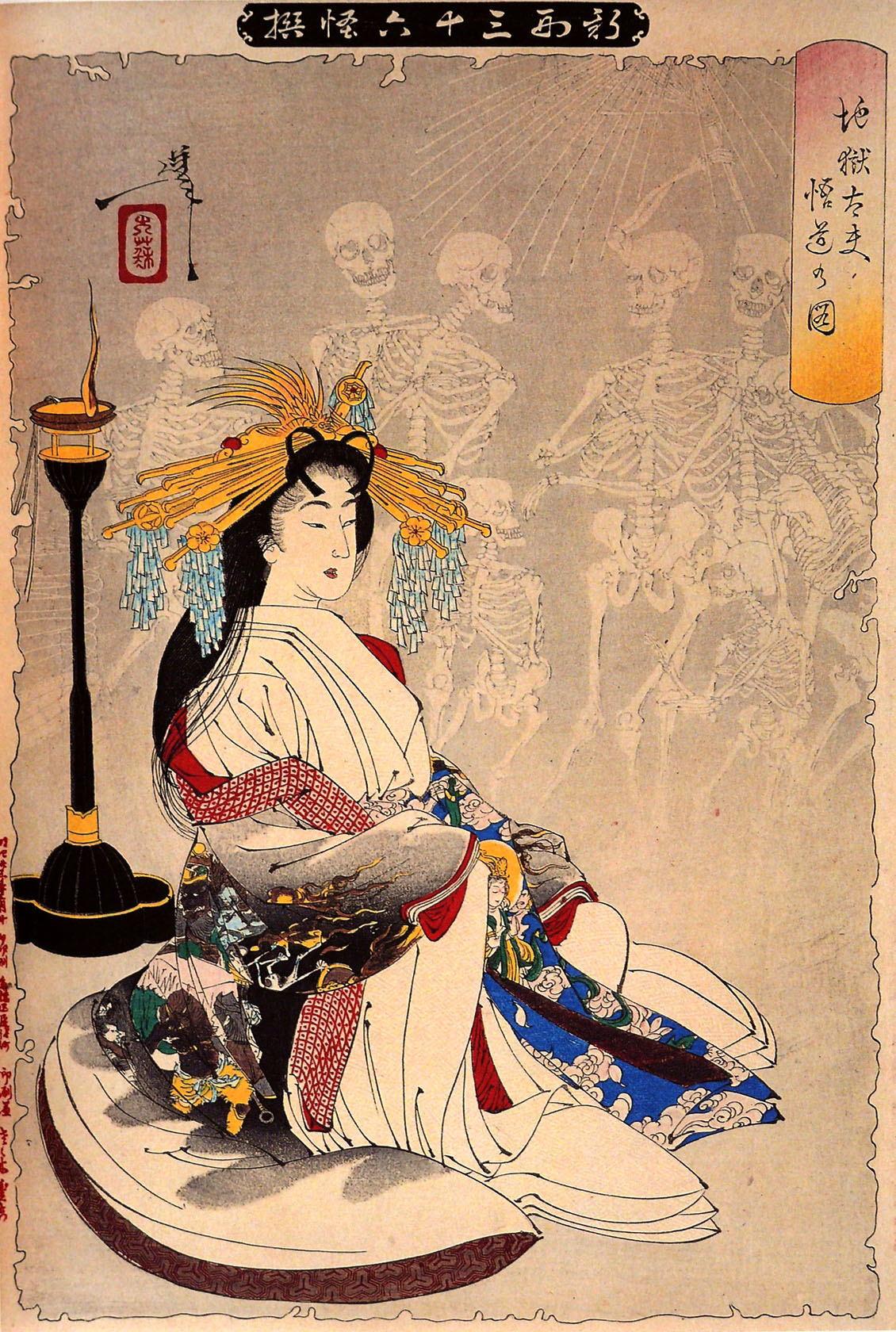
Tsukioka Yoshitoshi, The Enlightenment, February 1890. From the Thirty-six Ghosts series.

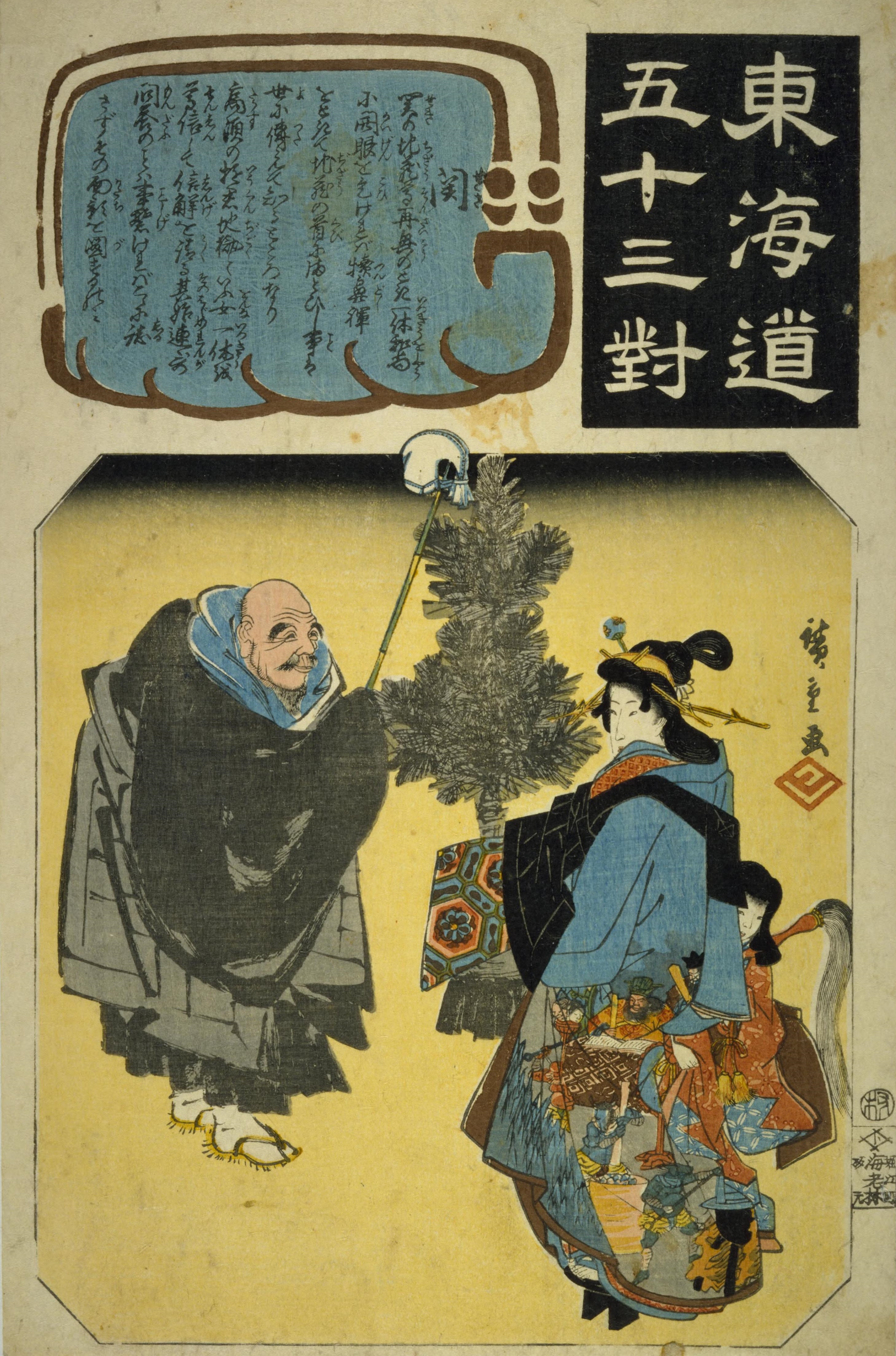
Hiroshige, "The 53 stations of the Tōkaidō in pairs"

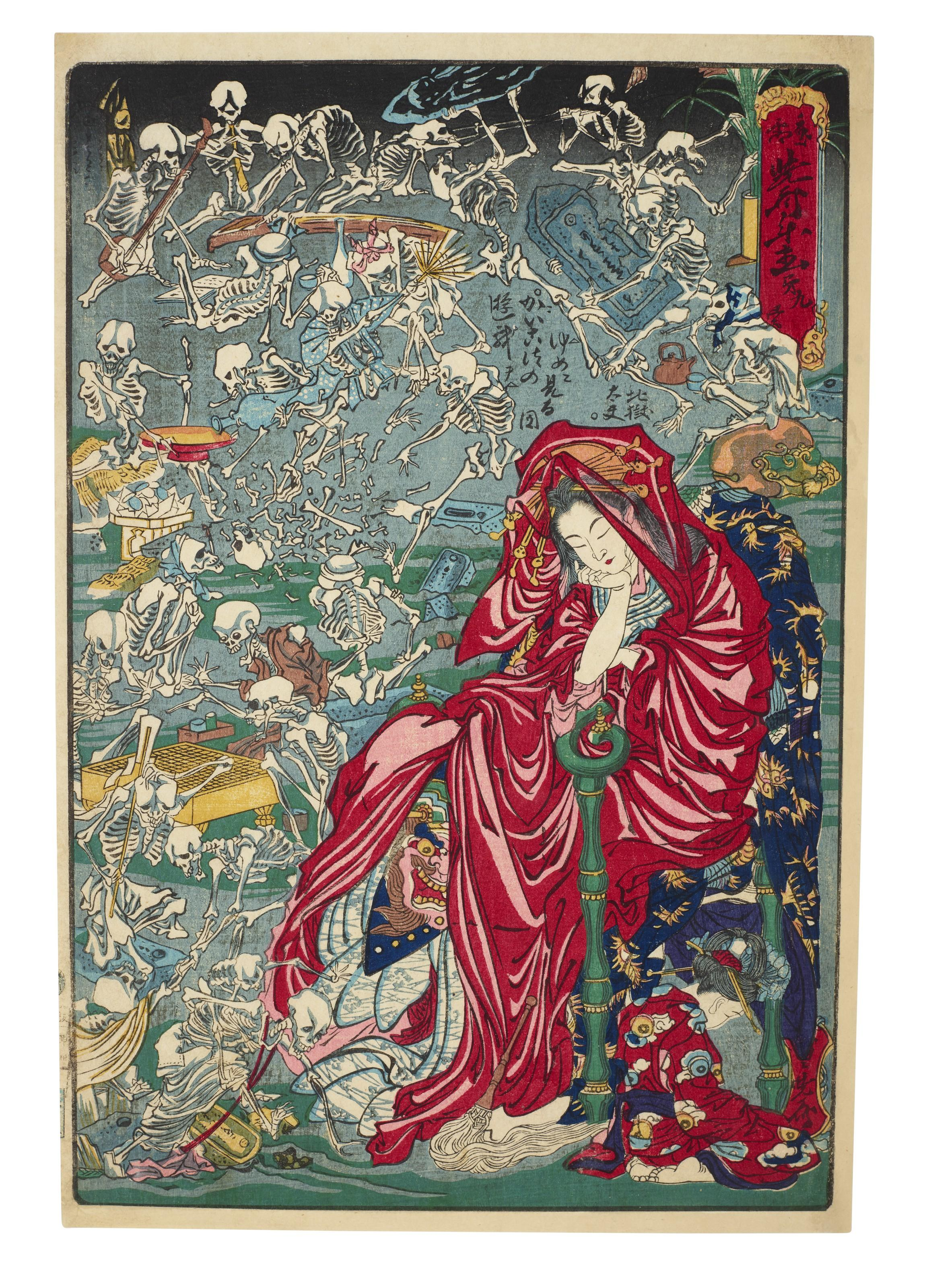
Kawanabe Kyōsai, Hell Courtesan no.9, 1874.
