= Takahashi Oden =

Female Japanese murderer

- 高橋 お伝
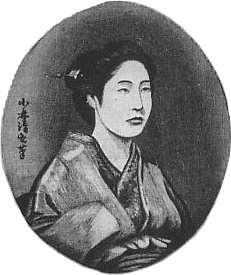
- Born: 1848
- Died: January 31, 1879 (aged 30–31)
- Cause of death: Beheading
- Notable work: The last woman in Japan to be put to death by beheading
- Criminal charges: Murder
- Penalty: Death

Details
- Victims: 1 convicted, 1 suspected
- Weapon: Poison

Takahashi Oden (高橋 お伝; 1848 – January 31, 1879) was a female Japanese murderer known for killing a man and being the last woman in Japan to be put to death by beheading. She was also suspected of poisoning her husband. The movie Dokufu Oden Takahashi is based on her life. Director Shōgorō Nishimura's Roman porno film Crimson Night Dream (紅夜夢, Koyamu) (1983) also depicts Takahashi.
