= Pierre de Frasnay =

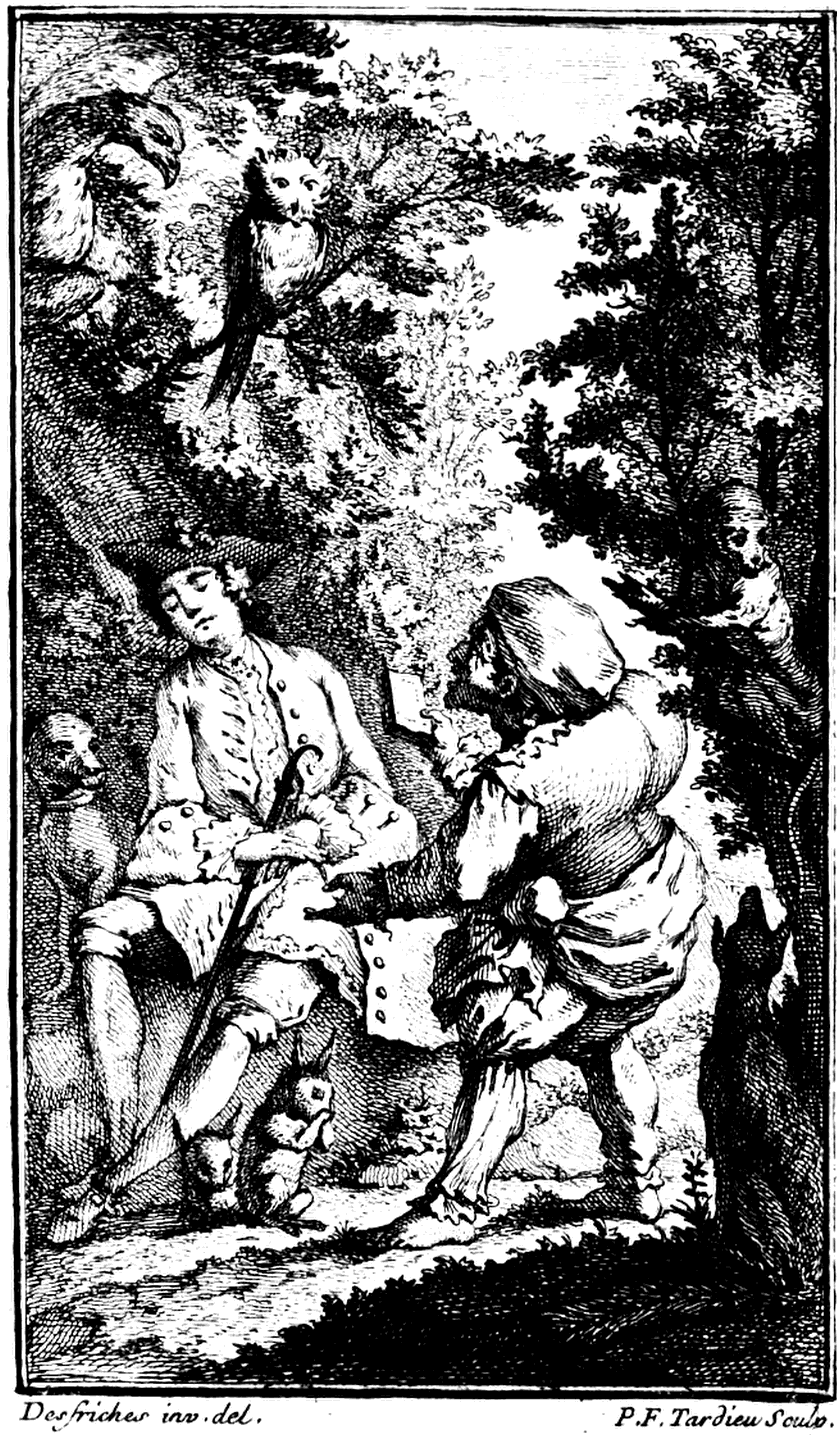
Aesop and the beasts inspire the poet, from de Frasnay’s collection of fables, 1750

Pierre de Frasnay (1676 in Nevers, Nivernais – 27 April 1753 in Nevers) was an 18th-century French writer, translator and local historian who on 15 May 1725 became baron de Neuvy-le-Barrois.

== Work ==
De Frasnay worked in the finance department of local government. He began his career as a writer by publishing genre poems in classical style in the Mercure de France. Among these was his Fayence (chinaware), written as a boost to the Nevers pottery trade and soon translated into Latin as Vasa Faventina, also in the 1735 Mercure. His subsequent researches into local history involved him in controversy concerning their accuracy, from which he soon withdrew. His final work was a two-volume compilation of Aesopic poems, Mythologie ou recueil des fables grecques, esopiques et sybaritiques (Orléans, 1750), to which he added prose reflections drawing out the human lessons of the fables.
