= Kawanabe Kyōsui =

Japanese painter

- Born: December 10, 1868; Edo, Japan
- Died: May 7, 1935 (aged 66)
- Known for: Ukiyoe, Nihonga

Kawanabe Kyōsui (河鍋 暁翠, December 10, 1868 – May 7, 1935) was a Meiji era painter for nihonga and ukiyoe.

== Early Training ==
Kyōsui learned painting with her father Kawanabe Kyōsai. Kyōsai encouraged his students to copy his work carefully to become proficient. As one of his students, Kyōsui became adept at this, producing works that to this day are indistinguishable from her father's, created in his name.

== Paintings ==
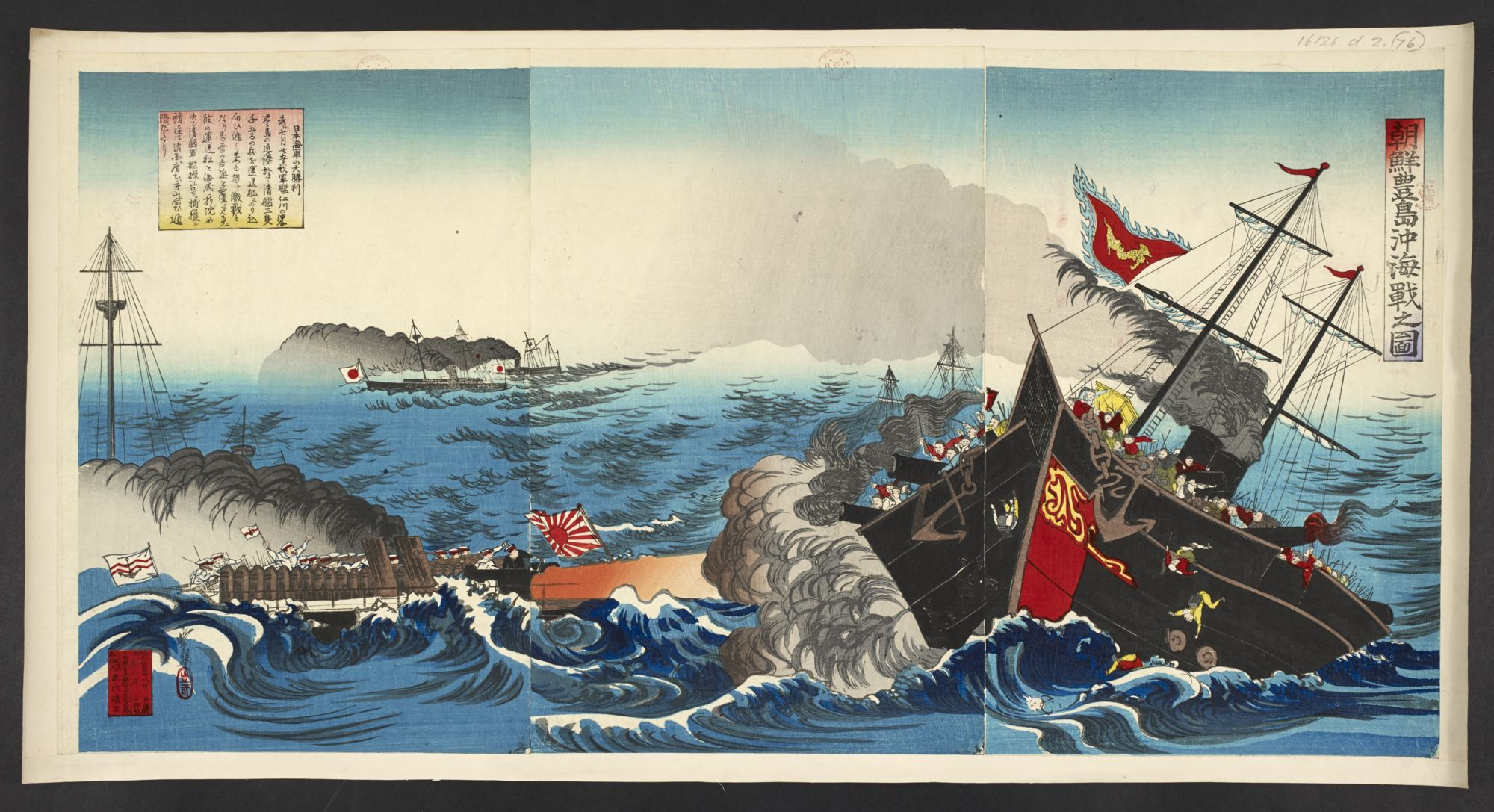
Illustration of The Battle of Pungdo (朝鮮豊島沖海戦之図) drawn by Kyōsui in 1894

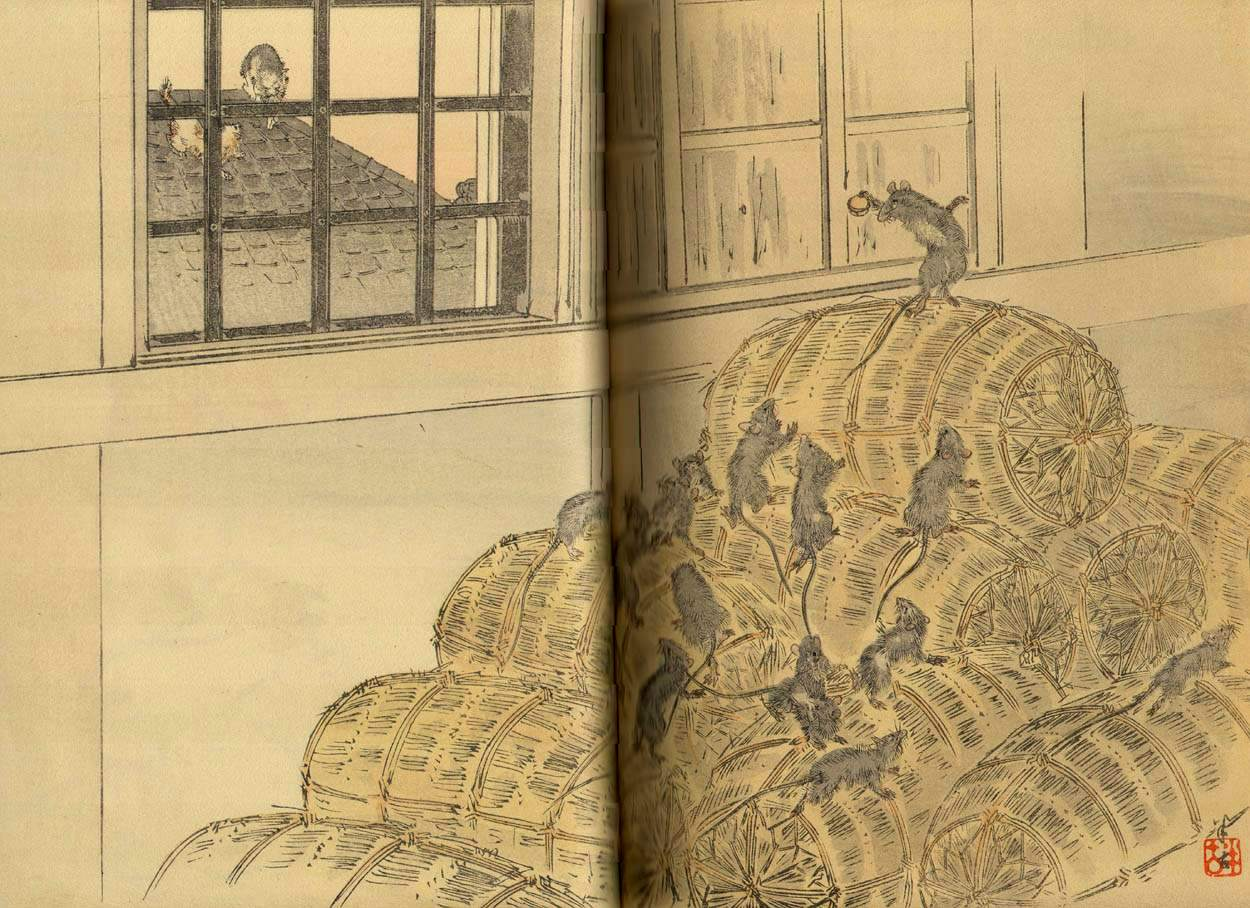
La Fontaine's fable The Mice in Council illustrated by Kyōsui in 1894

Kyōsui specialized in genres such as devotional Buddhist paintings, bijin-ga images and scenes from noh and kyōgen theater.

She was accepted into the second Naikoku Kaiga Kyoshinkai (内国共進会, National Painting Competition) at age 17.

She also depicted room interiors.

A large collection of Kyōsui's work is housed in the Kawanabe Kyosai Memorial Museum^{Ja} in Warabi in Saitama. Her work can also be found in the British Museum collection.

== University professorship ==
In 1902, the year after it opened, Kyōsui became the first female professor at the arts institution, Private Women's School of Fine Arts which later became Joshibi University of Art and Design.
