= Kawanabe Kyōsai =

Japanese artist (1831–1889)

- 河鍋 暁斎
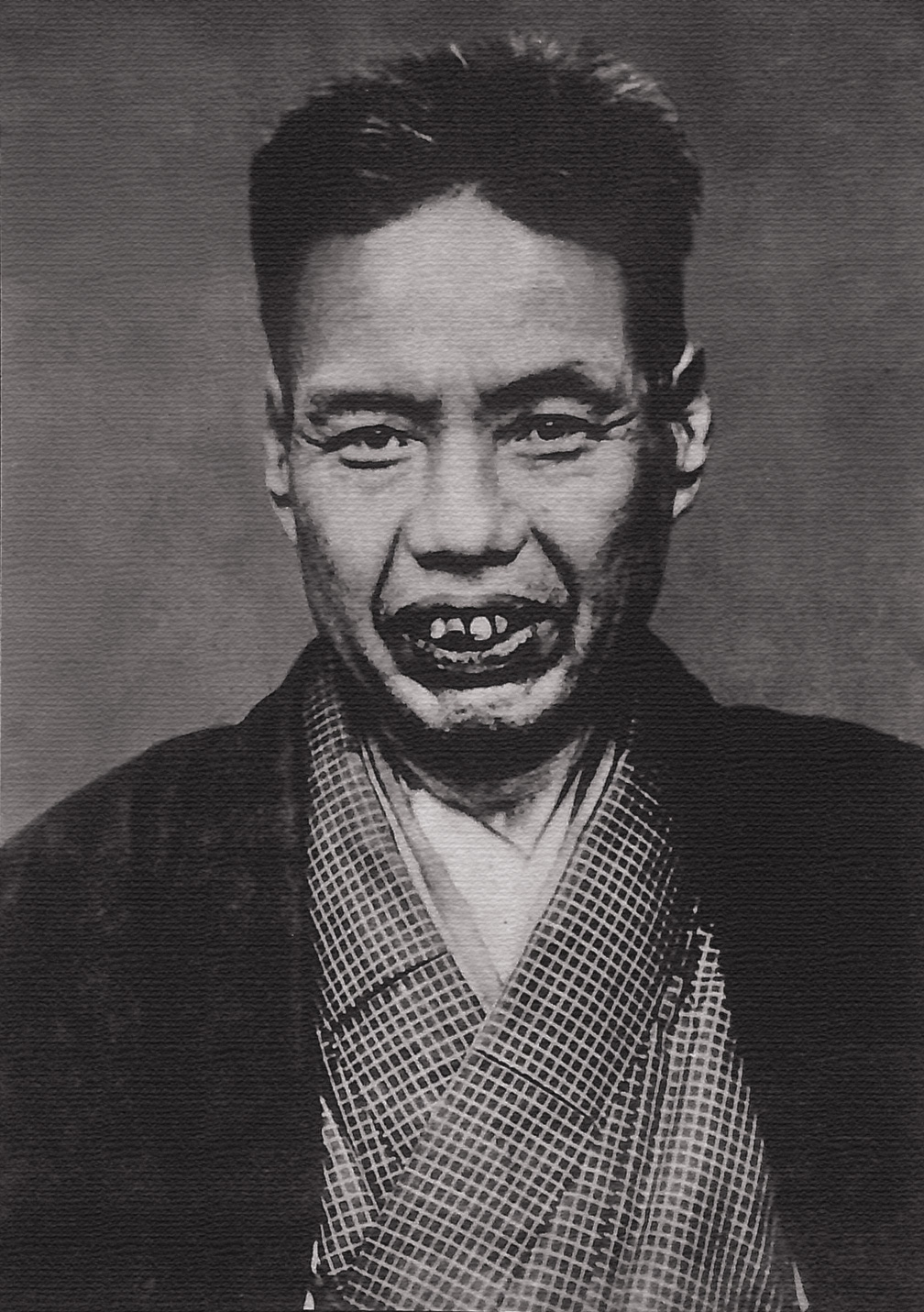
- Kawanabe Kyōsai in 1880s.
- Born: Shūzaburō; 18 May 1831; Koga Ishimachi, Shimousa Province, (currently Koga City, Ibaraki Prefecture), Japan
- Died: 26 April 1889 (aged 57); Zuirinji Temple, Tokyo, Japan
- Resting place: Taitō Ward, Tokyo
- Known for: Painting, drawing, portraits
- Movement: Ukiyo-e, Japanese Zen, Nihonga
- Family: Kawanabe Kyōsui (daughter)

Kawanabe Kyōsai (河鍋 暁斎; May 18, 1831 – April 26, 1889) was a Japanese painter and caricaturist. In the words of art historian Timothy Clark, "an individualist and an independent, perhaps the last virtuoso in traditional Japanese painting".

== Biography ==
Living through the Edo period to the Meiji period, Kyōsai witnessed Japan transform itself from a feudal country into a modern state. Born at Koga, he was the son of a samurai. His first shock was at the age of nine when he picked up a human head separated from a corpse in the Kanda river. After working for a short time as a boy with ukiyo-e artist Utagawa Kuniyoshi, he received his formal artistic training in the Kanō school under Maemura Tōwa (前村洞和, ? – 1841), who gave him the nickname "The Painting Demon", but Kyōsai soon abandoned the formal traditions for the greater freedom of the popular school. During the political foment which produced and followed the revolution of 1867, Kyōsai attained a reputation as a caricaturist. His very long painting on makimono (a horizontal type of Japanese handscroll/scroll) "The battle of the farts" may be seen as a caricature of this foment. He was arrested three times and imprisoned by the authorities of the shogunate. Soon after the assumption of effective power by Emperor Meiji, a great congress of painters and men of letters was held at which Kyōsai was present. He again expressed his opinion of the new movement in a caricature, which had a great popular success, but also brought him into the hands of the police, this time of the opposite party.

Kyōsai's collaboration with the writer Kanagaki Robun is said to have begun when Robun met the painter while writing an account of the 1855 Edo earthquake, the day after it struck; a sketch of a catfish by Kyōsai that accompanied Robun's text became Kyōsai's first single-sheet ukiyo-e woodblock print. Its commercial success led Robun to go on to produce a sequence of similar catfish images, known as namazu-e. Kyōsai's daughter, Kawanabe Gyōsui, went on to become a significant eccentric artist in the second half of the 19th century, teaching nihonga at Joshibi University and producing prints based on Edo-era paintings, triptychs paying homage to the style of Toyohara Chikanobu, and, in the 1930s, several kachō-ga (bird-and-flower paintings).

Kyōsai is considered by many to be the greatest successor of Hokusai (of whom, however, he was not a pupil), as well as the first political caricaturist of Japan. His work mirrored his life in its wild and undisciplined nature, and occasionally reflected his love of drink. Although he did not possess Hokusai's dignity, power or reticence, he compensated with a fantastic exuberance, which always lent interest to his technically excellent draughtsmanship.

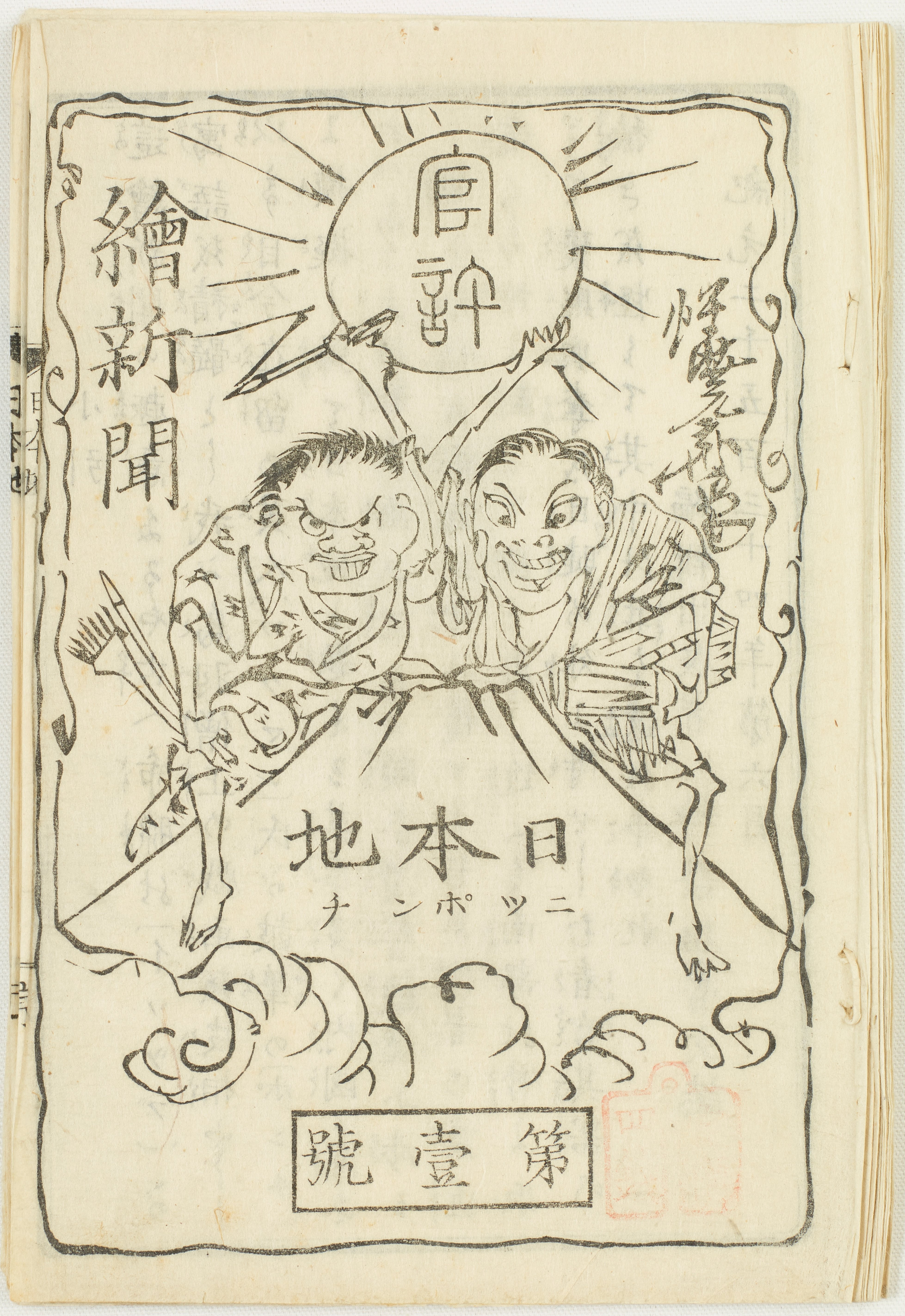
E-shimbun Nippon-chi (1874), published by Kanagaki Robun and Kawanabe Kyosai.

He created what is considered to be the first manga magazine in 1874: Eshinbun Nipponchi, with Kanagaki Robun. The magazine was heavily influenced by Japan Punch, founded in 1862 by Charles Wirgman, a British cartoonist. Eshinbun Nipponchi had a very simple style of drawings and did not become popular with many people, and ended after just three issues.

In addition to his caricatures, Kyōsai painted a large number of pictures and sketches, often choosing subjects from Japanese folklore, Noh plays, nature, and religion, for example The Temptation of Shaka Niorai or The Goddess Kwannon on a dragon (on kakejiku frame). A fine collection of these works is preserved in the British Museum; and there are also good examples in the National Art Library at South Kensington and the Guimet Museum at Paris. The Kawanabe Kyōsai Memorial Museum was established in 1977, located at Warabi, Saitama Prefecture, Japan.

Erwin Bälz wrote in his diary that Kyosai died because of gastric cancer.

A crater on Mercury has been named in his honor.

== Biographies ==
The most important work about Kyōsai's art and life was written by himself: Kyōsai Gadan (暁斎画談, Kyōsai's Treatise on Painting), half autobiography and half painting manual. An important contemporary work concerning the artist is Kawanabe Kyōsai-ō den (河鍋暁斎翁伝, Biography of the Venerable Kawanabe Kyōsai), by Iijima Kyoshin (飯島虚心). The work was finished in 1899, but published only in 1984.

Many westerners came to visit Kyōsai and wrote substantial memoirs about the artist. Two of the most important, both rare, are:

- Émile Étienne Guimet, Promenades japonaises, Paris, 1880
- Josiah Conder, Paintings and Studies by Kawanabe Kyōsai, Tokyo, 1911. Conder was a serious student of Japanese art; after some initial rejections, he was accepted as Kyōsai's pupil, and accompanied him for ten years until the master's death.

The most updated, and easily available, reference to Kyōsai's life and works in English is:

- Timothy Clark, Demon of Painting: the Art of Kawanabe Kyōsai, London: Published for the Trustees of the British Museum by the British Museum Press, 1993

== Gallery ==
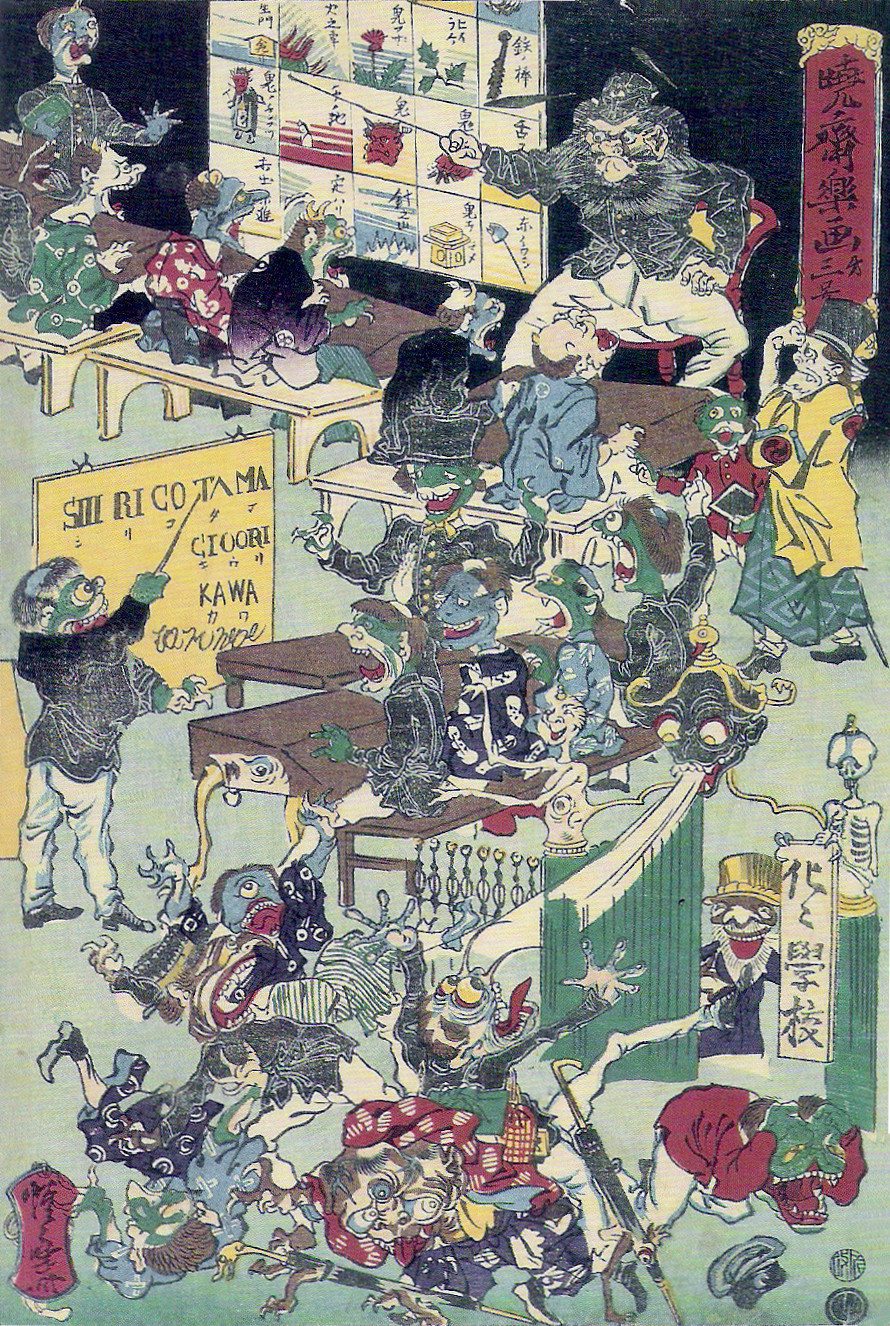
Bake-Bake Gakkō (化々學校), or "School for Spooks". In August 1872, the Meiji government decided to implement a system of compulsory education. In this caricature, both demons (above) and kappa (center) are learning vocabulary concerning their daily life. The former are taught by Shōki the demon queller, dressed in western-style uniform. Some goblins try to enter the school (below), but are blown away by the Wind God.

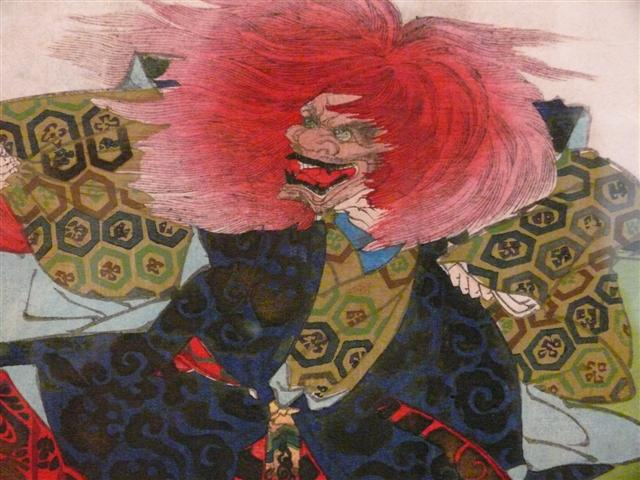
Renjishi (連獅子), or "Dance of a Pair of Lions", by Kyōsai. Renjishi is a famous dance in the Kabuki theatre.

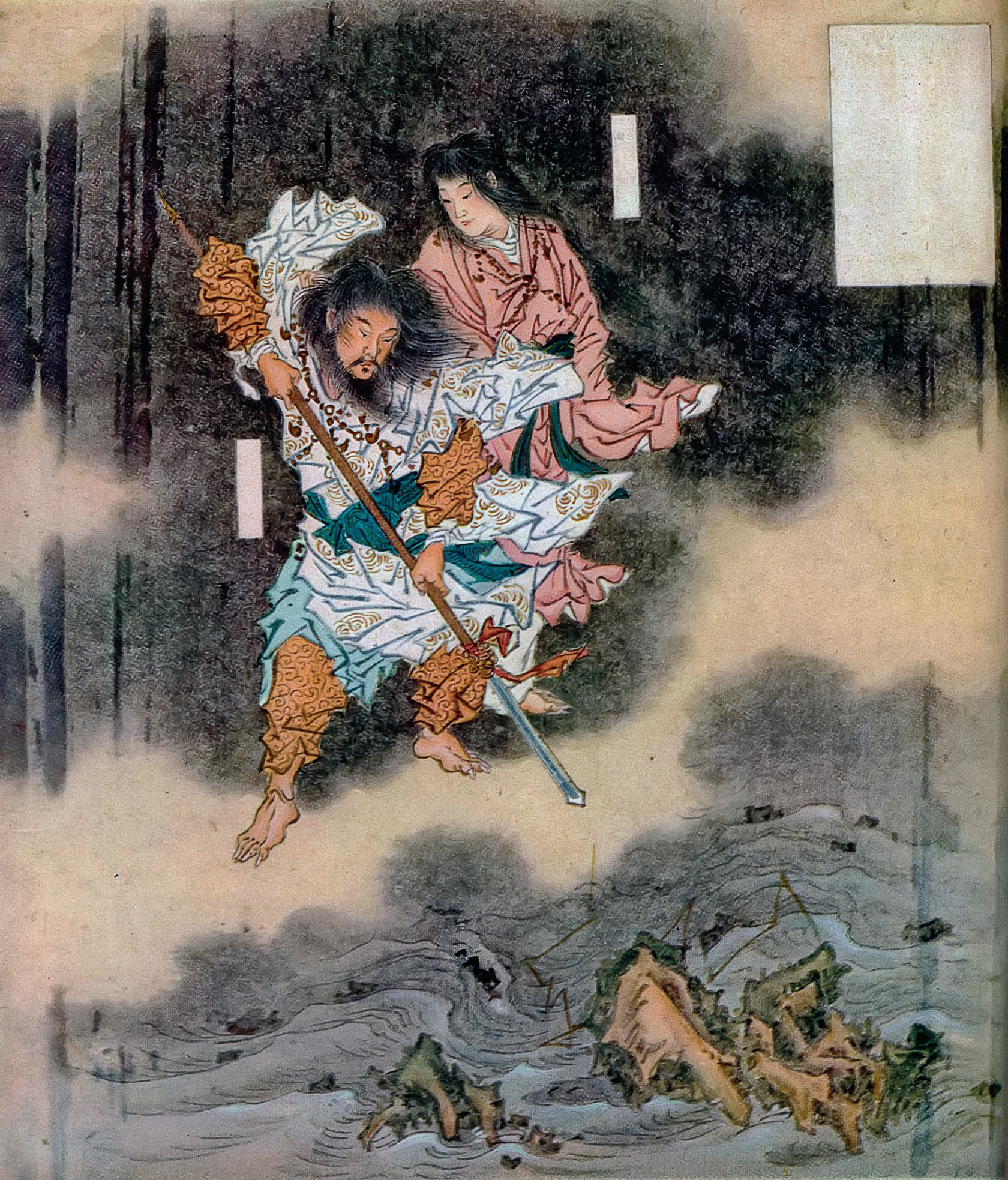
Izanagi and Izanami giving birth to Japan, c. 1870

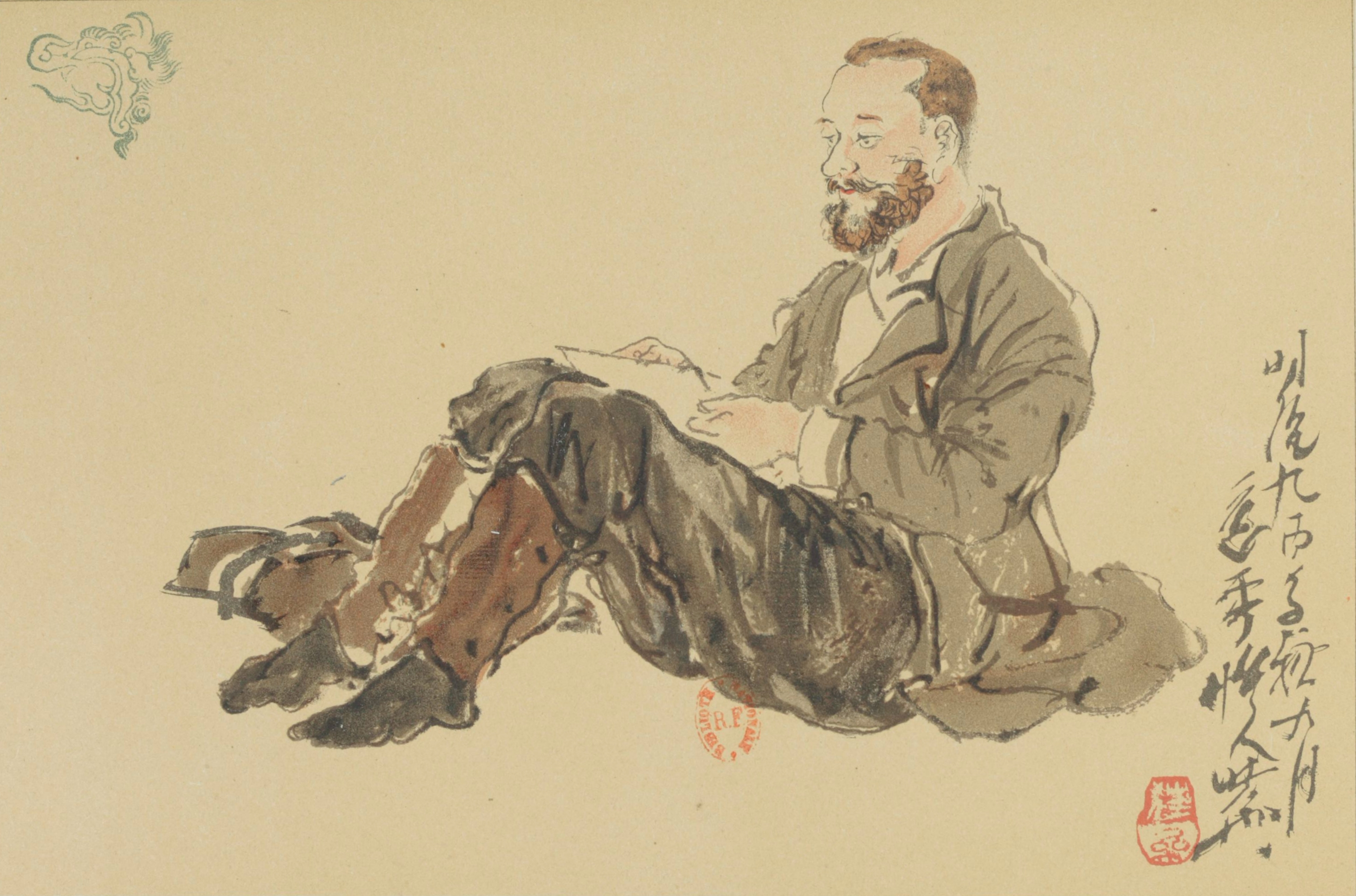
Promenades japonaises, 1880

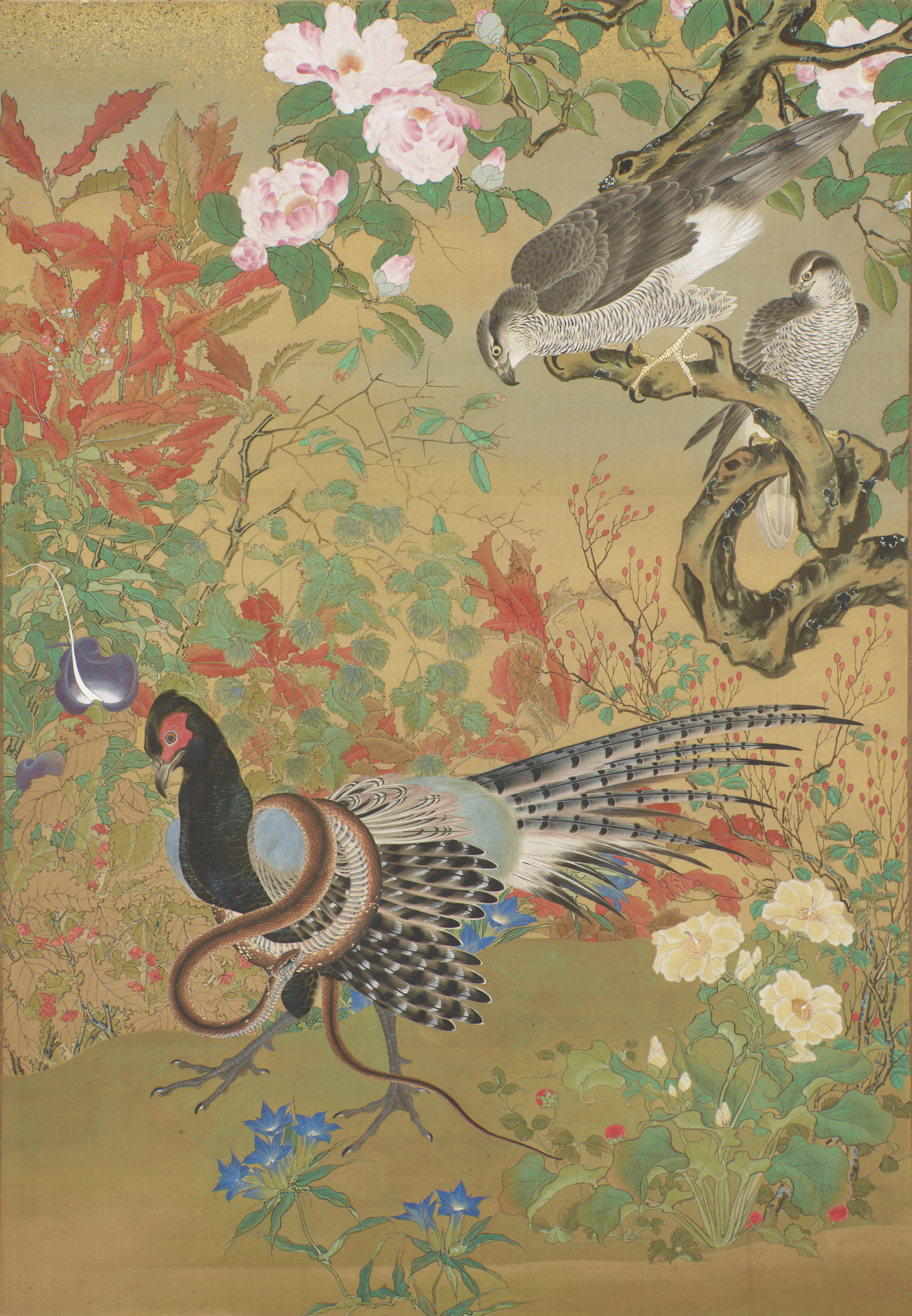
Flowers and Birds (花鳥図), 1881, Exhibited at The second National Industrial Exhibition.

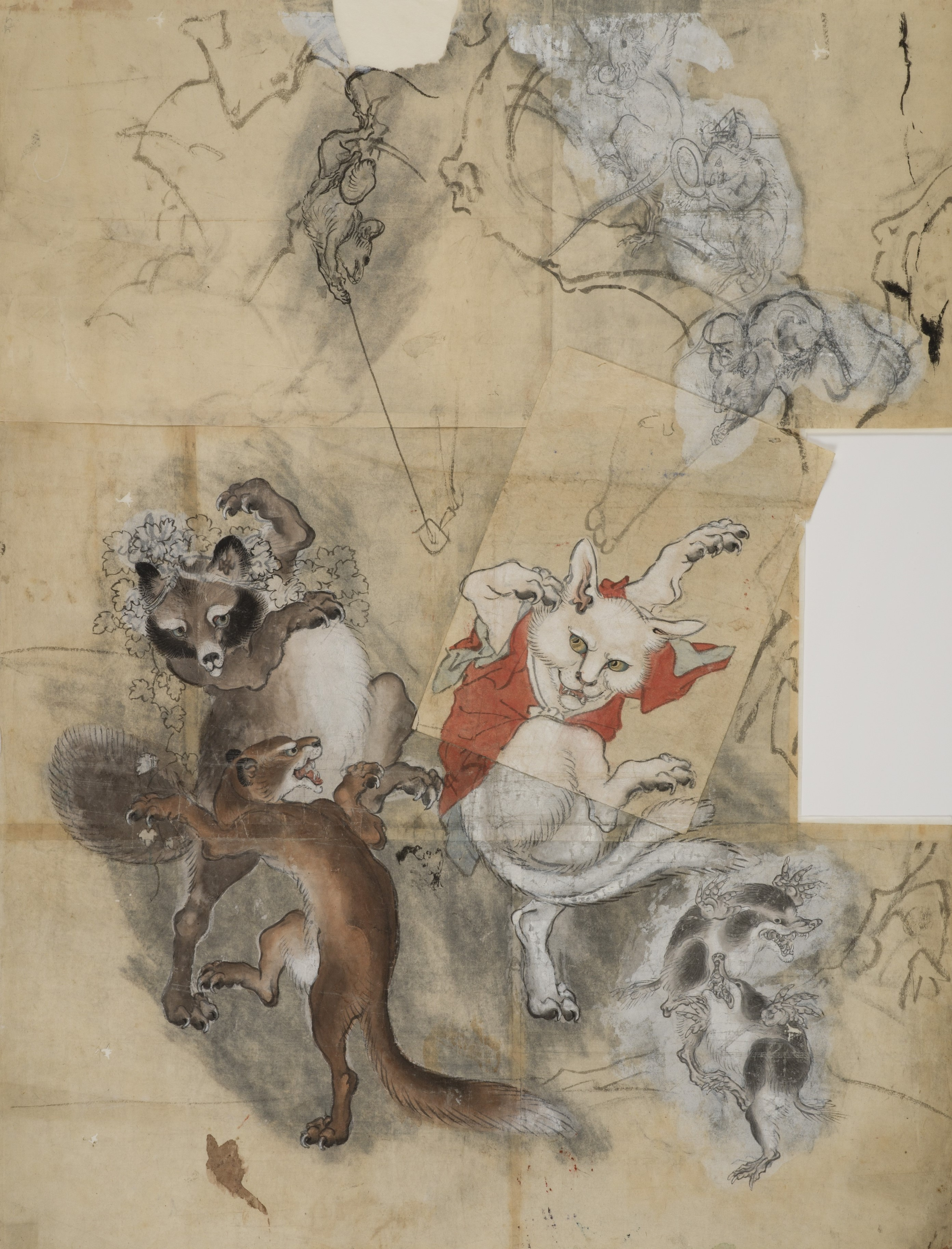
Frolicking Animals, Nekomata and Tanuki Badger

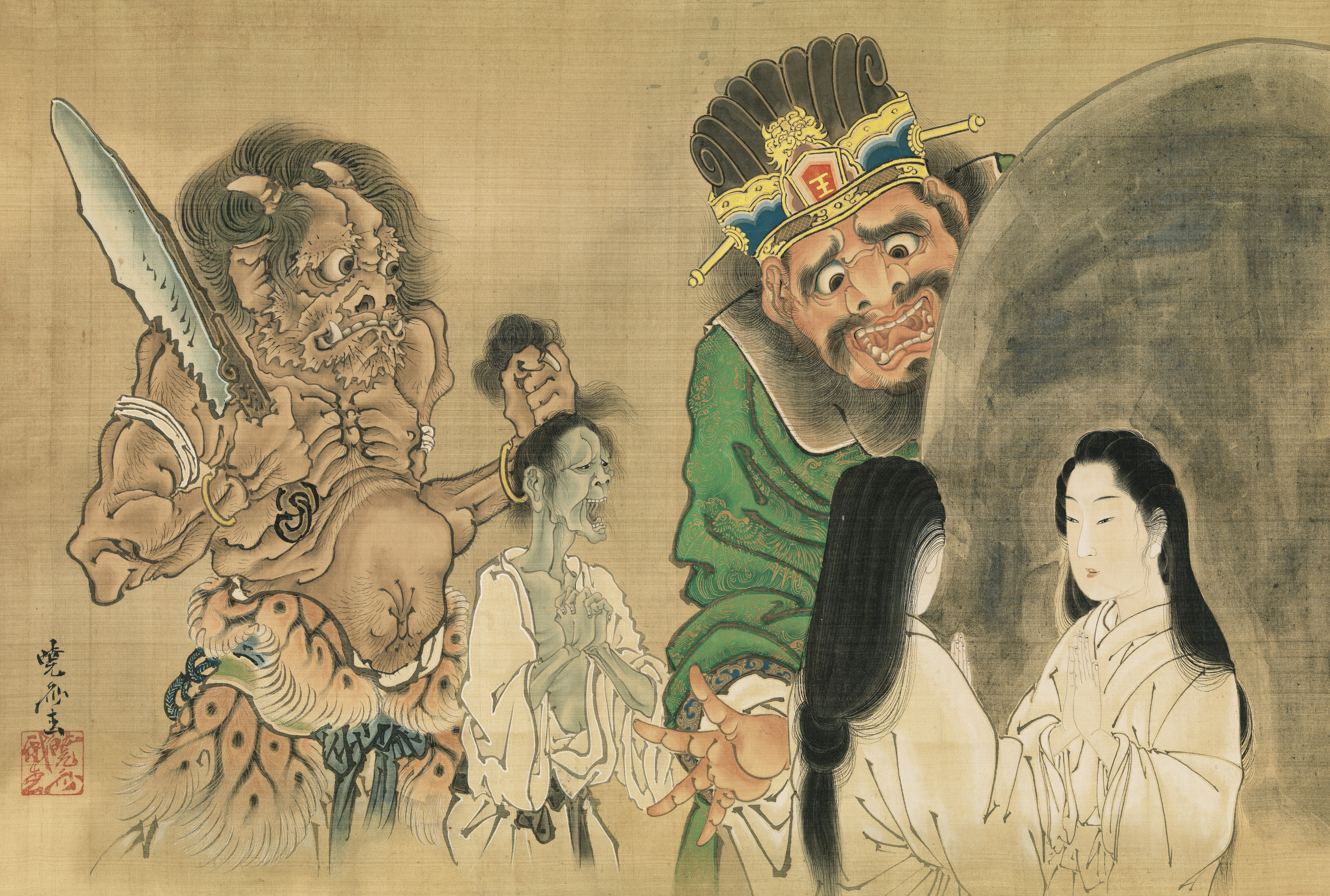
A Beauty in Front of King Enma's Mirror

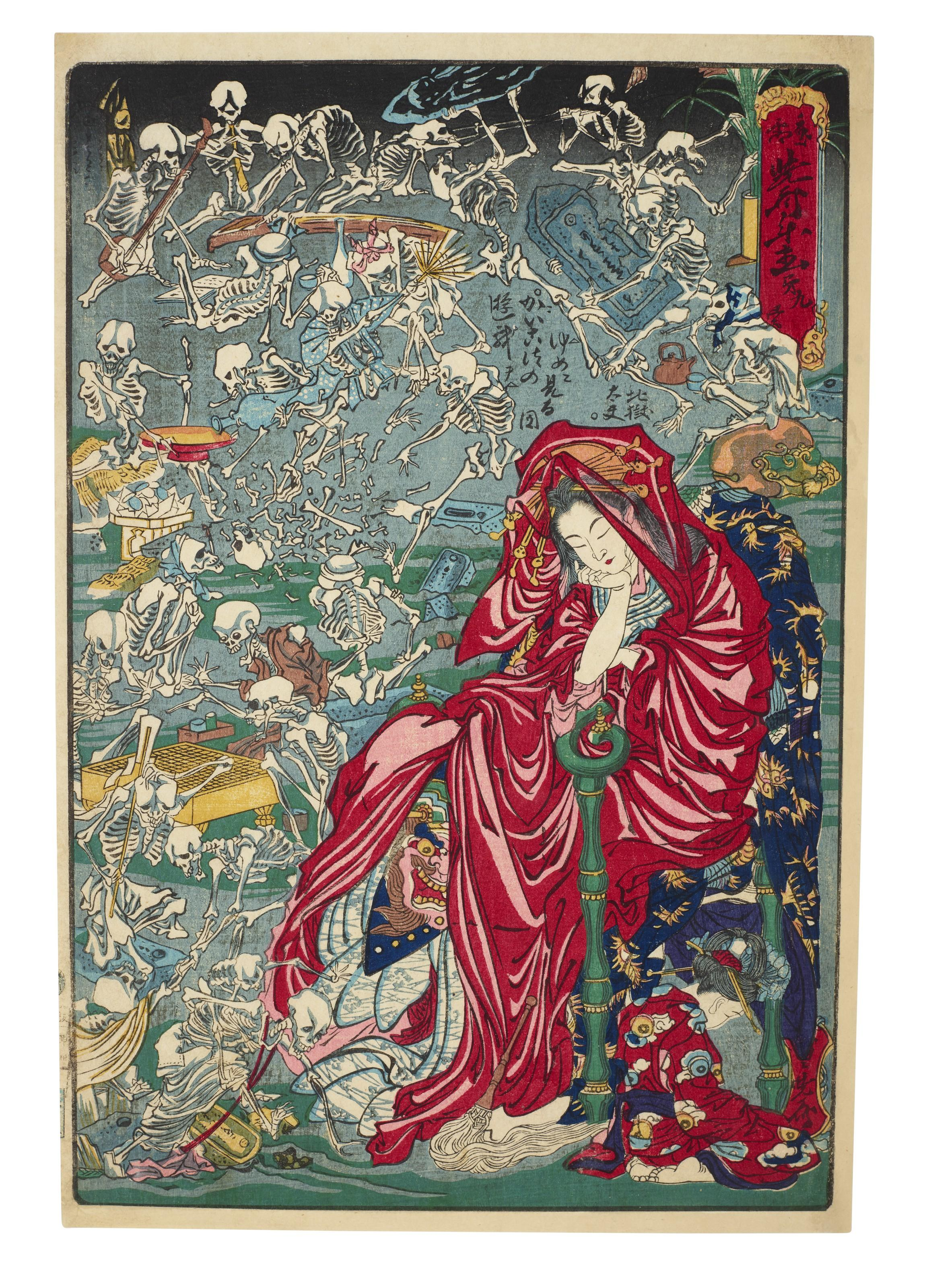
Hell Courtesan

Full Moon with Crow on Plum Branch, 1930

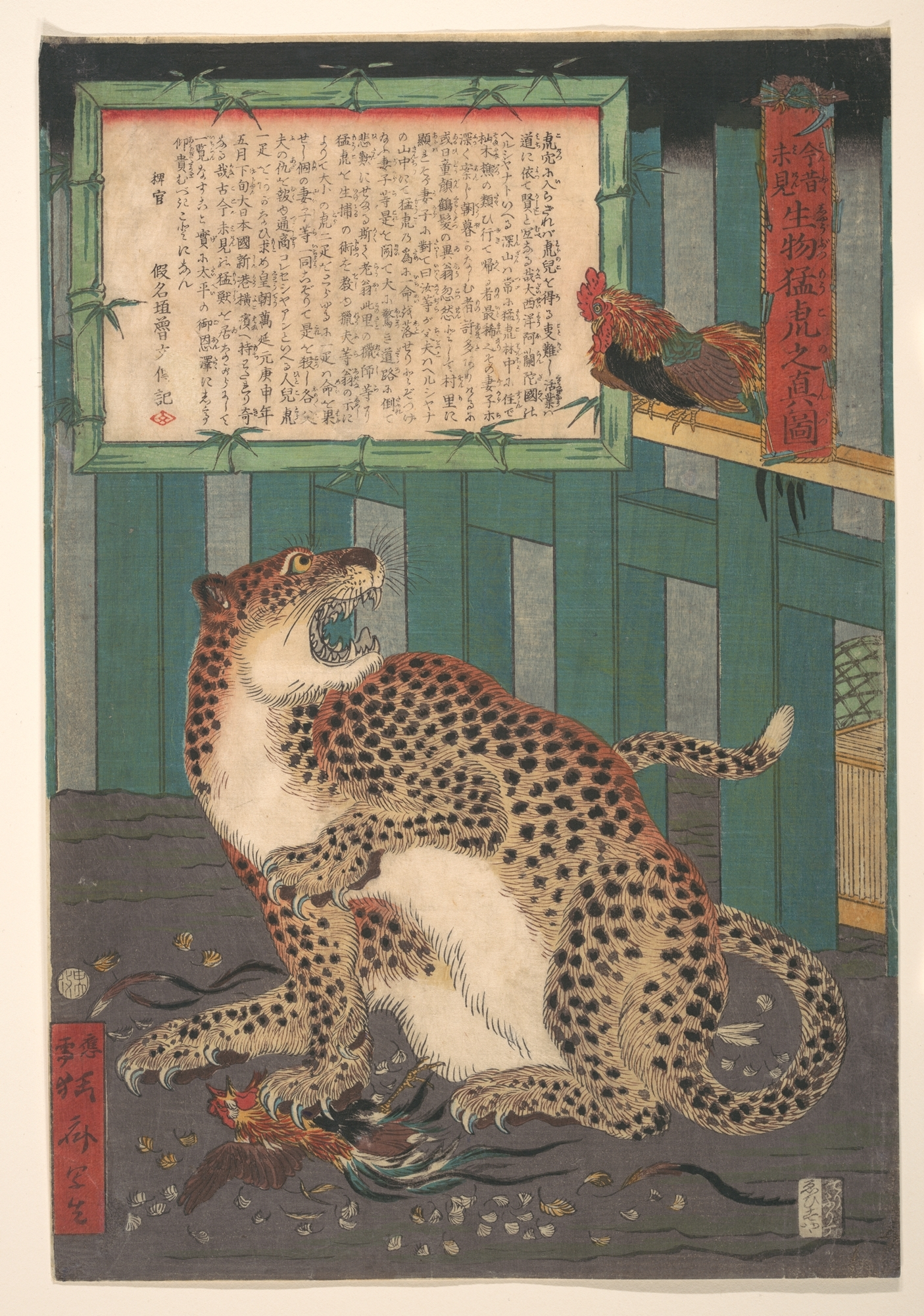
Never Seen Before - True Picture of a Live Wild Tiger

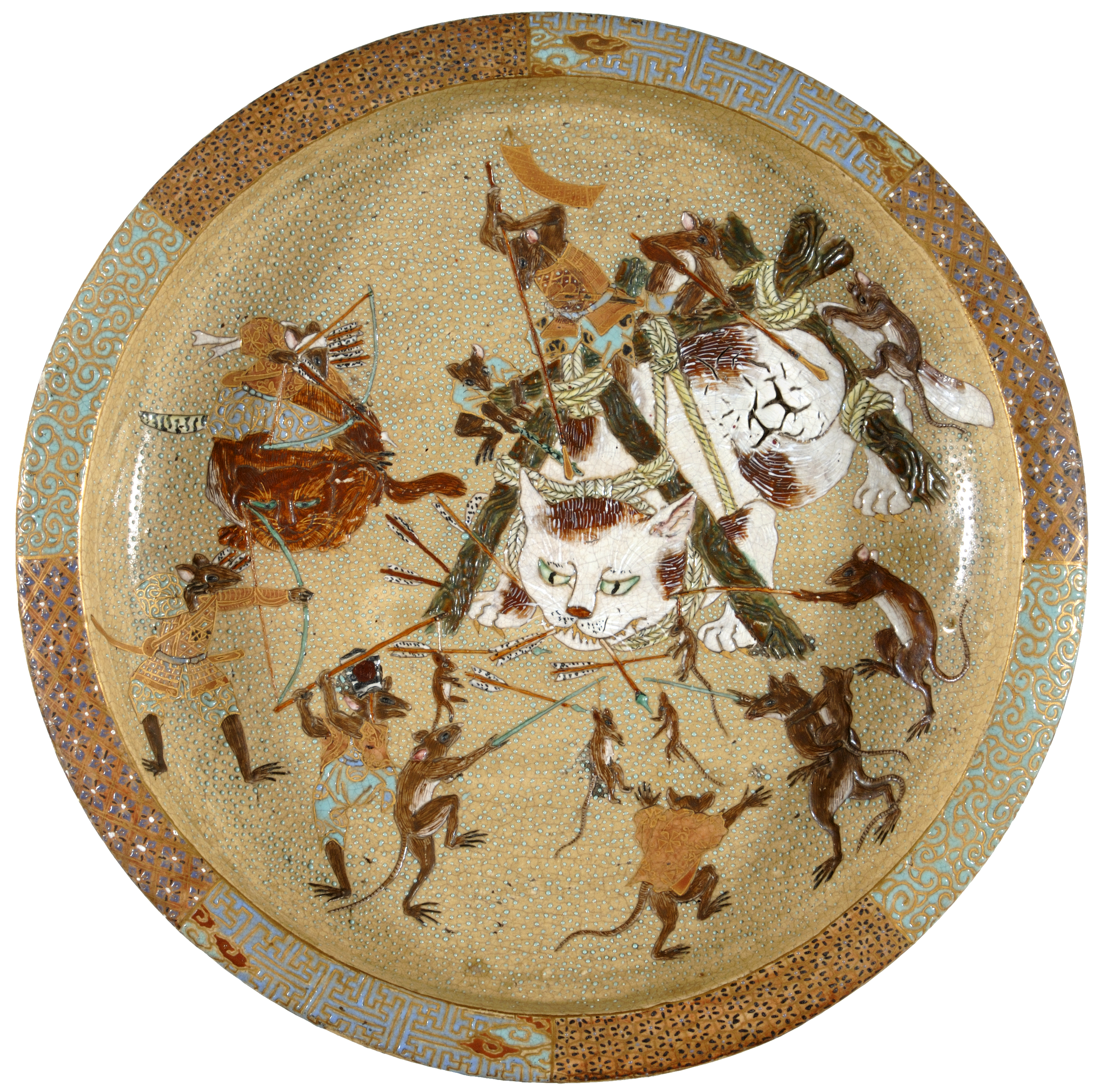
Japanese Mino ware (stoneware) plate decorated with an image of rats attacking cats after Kawanabe Kyousai (1831-1899). Found at the Russell-Cotes Art Gallery & Museum in Bournemouth, England.
