= Chelone =

Chelone may refer to:

- Chelone (plant), commonly known as turtleheads
- Chelone (mythology), a nymph in Greek mythology, who appears in Aesop's fable Zeus and the Tortoise.
- Chelone formation, Greek term for Testudo formation
- Chelone, a genus of sea turtle in the Cheloniidae family.
