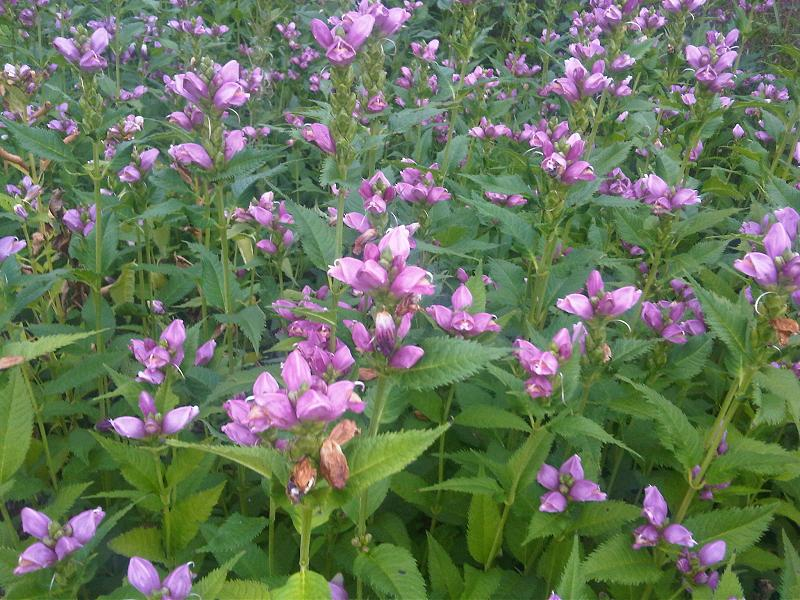

Scientific classification
- Kingdom: Plantae
- Clade: Tracheophytes
- Clade: Angiosperms
- Clade: Eudicots
- Clade: Asterids
- Order: Lamiales
- Family: Plantaginaceae
- Genus: Chelone
- Species: C. obliqua

Binomial name
- Chelone obliqua L.
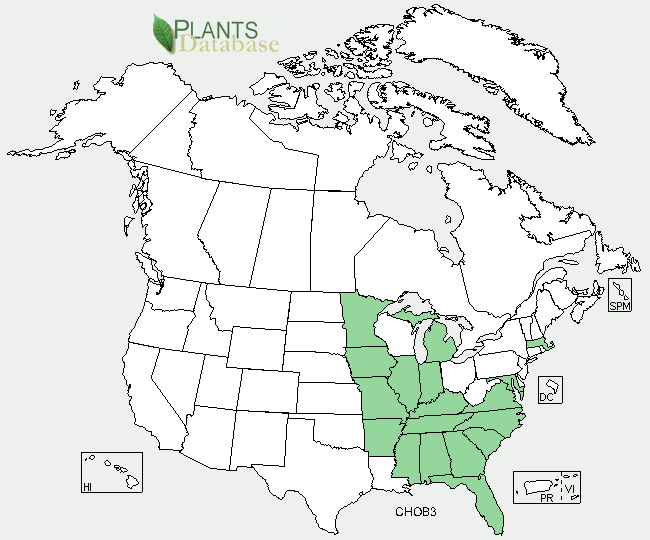
- Distribution of Chelone obliqua

= Chelone obliqua =

Species of flowering plant

Chelone obliqua, the red turtlehead, rose turtlehead or pink turtlehead, is a perennial flowering plant belonging to the family Plantaginaceae. This uncommon wildflower is endemic to the United States, where it is found in the Midwestern and southeastern states.

The three common names come from the bloom colors, yet they may even appear in other colors such as purple or white. When blooming, the flower is said to resemble the head of a turtle.

== Description ==
Chelone obliqua is an herbaceous perennial plant that grows to a height of 2 to 3 feet (61 to 91 cm) and can spread out 1 to 2 feet (30 to 61 cm).

The central stem is light green, smooth and hairless, and cylindrical; there are pairs of opposite leaves along the sides that tend to droop. Its leaf blades are lanceolate to broadly lanceolate, hairless, and serrated along their margins. The upper blade exhibits a dark green surface, while the lower blade surface is a paler green. A petiole arises from the base of each leaf blade.

C. obliqua blooms later than some herbaceous perennials, in mid to late summer. The flowers are tubular 2-lipped blooms, with a small yellow beard inside each lower lip. There is no floral scent and the flowers are cross pollinated by bees and attractive to butterflies.

An ovoid seed capsule evolves subsequent to the corollas of the flowers turning brown and falling off. The seeds' capsules are initially light green and uncovered (no coating), and later turn brown and split open to release the seeds. It is rhizomatous with occasional vegetative colony growth.

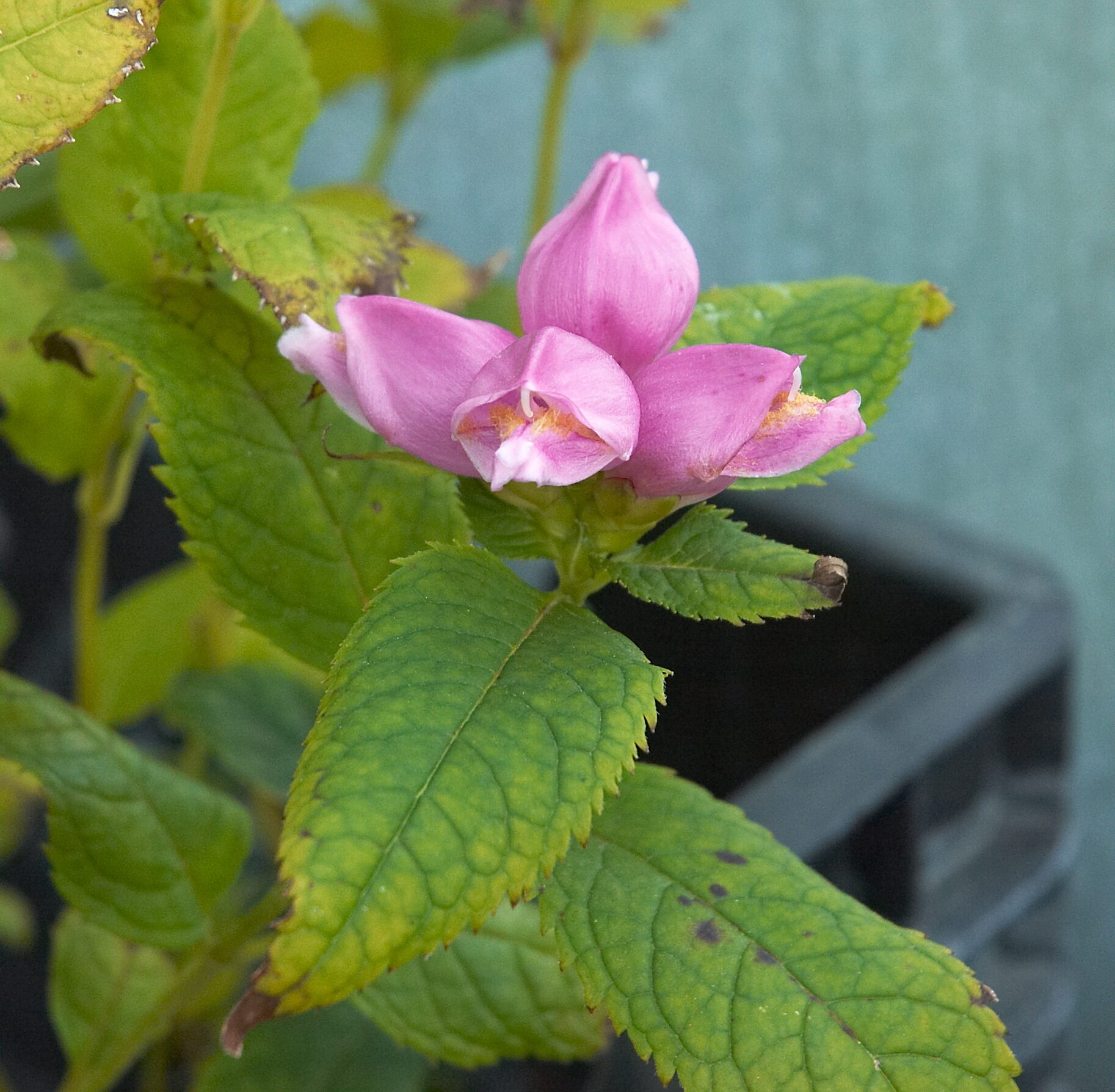
Flower

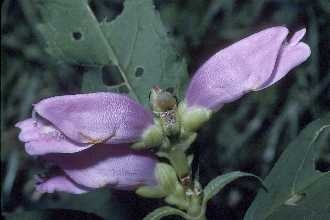
Purple corolla

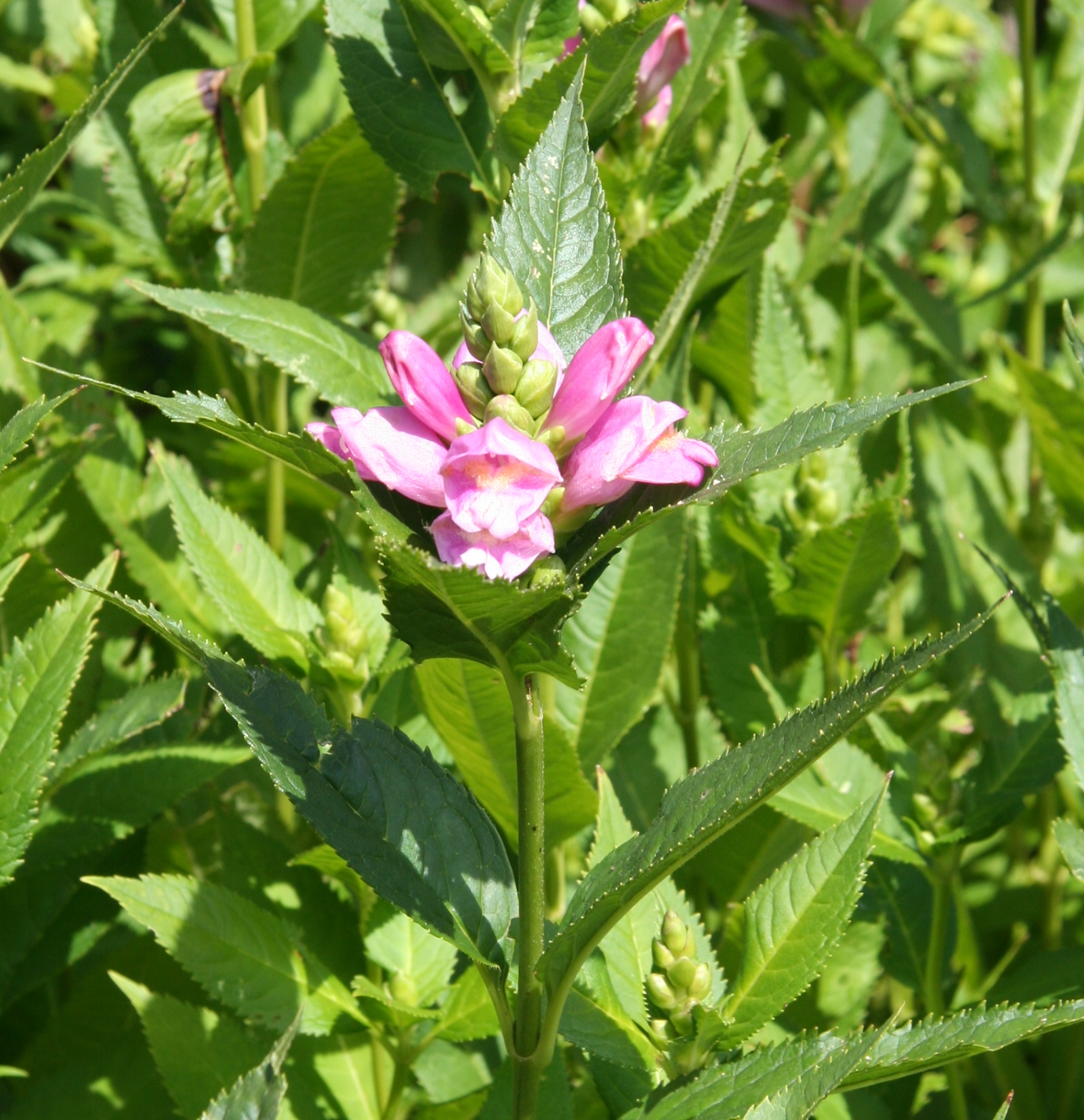
Flower

=== Varieties ===
Varieties include:

- Chelone obliqua var. erwiniae — Erwin's red turtlehead, Kentucky, North Carolina, South Carolina.
- Chelone obliqua var. obliqua — red turtlehead, the Southeast.
- Chelone obliqua var. speciosa — red turtlehead, the Midwest.

== Distribution ==
Chelone obliqua is native to various states in the eastern and central parts of the country, including: Arkansas, Alabama, Florida, Georgia, Illinois, Iowa, Indiana, Kentucky, Massachusetts, Maryland, Michigan, Minnesota, Missouri, Mississippi, North Carolina, South Carolina, Tennessee, and Virginia.

It is found as tetraploid in the Blue Ridge Mountains; or as hexaploid in areas ranging from Tennessee to Arkansas and Michigan, and on the Atlantic coastal plain from South Carolina to Maryland. It has arisen several times from diploid ancestors of the other three species of the genus Chelone (Chelone glabra, Chelone lyonii and Chelone cuthbertii).

== Conservation ==
The plant has become a rare wildflower and is threatened and endangered in some states, according to the United States Department of Agriculture. Populations of the red turtlehead are threatened in Maryland, Missouri and North Carolina. The red turtlehead is critically imperiled in Michigan, Iowa, Tennessee and Alabama. It is possibly extirpated in Georgia and Mississippi. Introduced non-native populations exist in Massachusetts. The variety obliqua is endangered in Kentucky and threatened in Maryland, while the speciosa variety is endangered in Arkansas and of special concern in Kentucky.

== Cultivation ==
Chelone obliqua is cultivated as an ornamental plant. Optimal bloom period is within the months of July and August.

Dispersal of seeds can occur in the early spring, then divide in mid-spring and produce root soft-tip cuttings in the early summer. It is best grown in moist to wet, rich, humusy soils in full sun to partly shaded regions. C. obliqua is tolerant of clay soil, and may benefit from leaf mulch in total sunlight to prevent it from drying out. It can grow in any pH condition (neutral, alkaline, or acidic). Hence, it is mainly grown in moist woods, swampy areas and along streams.

Some problems that may arise include a disposition to powdery mildew, rust, fungal leaf spots, and damage from slugs and snails.

== Etymology ==
Chelone is derived from Greek meaning 'turtle-like', in reference to its turtle head-shaped corollas.

Obliqua means 'slanting', 'having unequal sides', or 'oblique'.
