= The Moon and her Mother =

One of Aesop's Fables

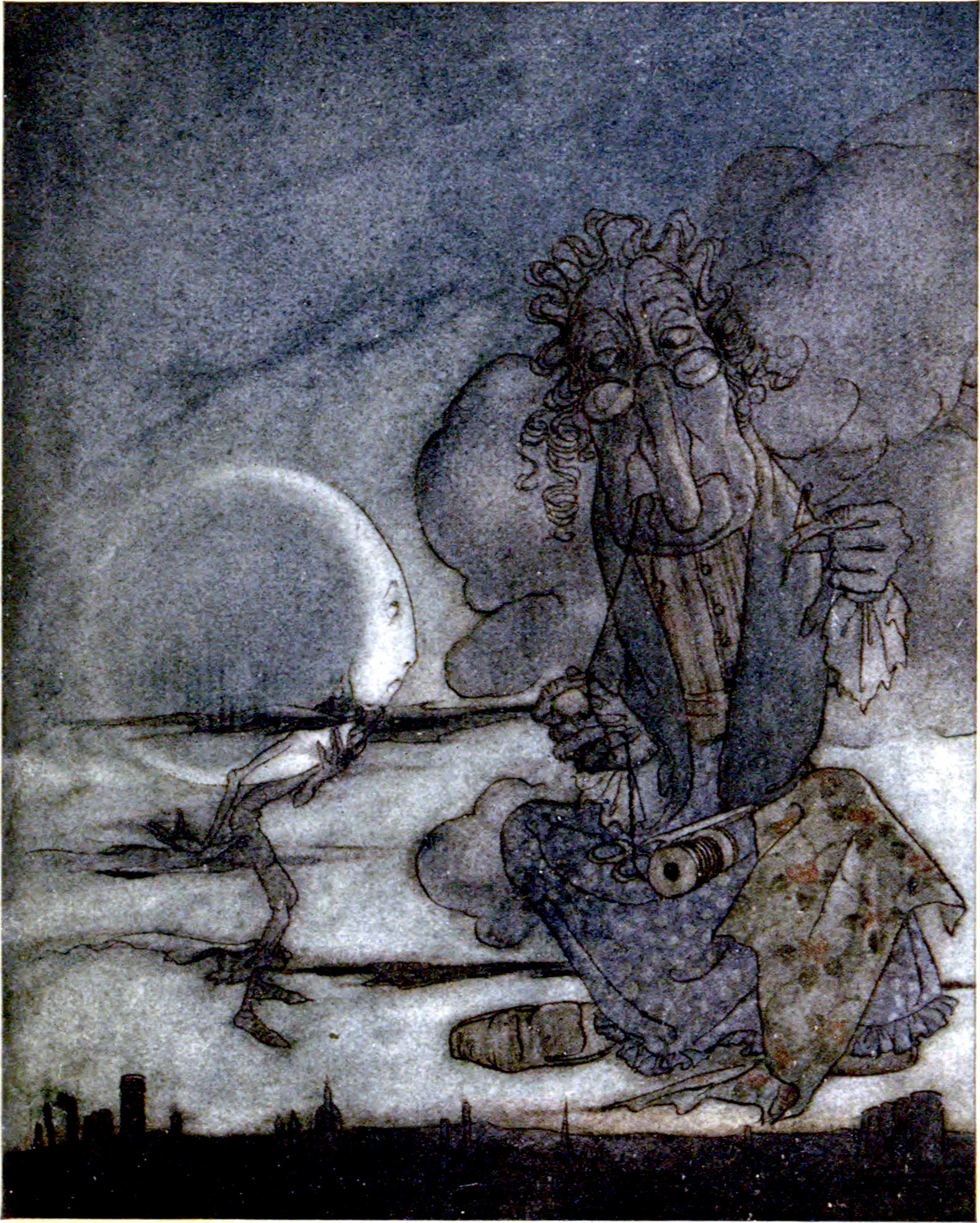
- The Moon asks her mother, illustration by Arthur Rackham.

Folk tale
- Name: The Moon and her Mother
- Mythology: Greek
- Region: Greece

The Moon and her Mother (Ancient Greek: Σελήνη καὶ μήτηρ) is an ancient Greek fable doubtfully attributed to Aesop. It is number 468 in the Perry Index, and in Laura Gibbs's inclusive collection it is listed as number 16 in the Vernon Jones index (1912).

The story is attested by the Greek author Plutarch in his Banquet of the Seven Sages from the Moralia, who attributes it there to the sage Cleobulus, who in turn relates it as a tale told by his daughter Cleobulina to her brother.

The fable is now included in many collections of Aesop's fables, but the lesson to be learnt from it differs from narrator to narrator.

== Fable ==
In the story as related by Plutarch, "the Moon (Note: Personified by the ancient Greeks as the goddess Selene. Her mother is said to be Theia, though in the fable the mother is not named.) wanted her mother to weave for her a garment to fit her measure; and the mother said, "How can I weave it to fit your measure? For now I see you full and round, and at another time crescent-shaped, and at still another but little more than half your full size." The conclusion drawn by Cleobulus is that "there is no measure of possessions that can be applied to a foolish and worthless man". Cleobulus then goes on to liken such a foolish person to the improvident dog in a fable told by Aesop – who is also present at the feast.

== Versions ==
The earliest English account of the story as a separate fable appears in Roger L'Estrange's Fables of Aesop (1692) under the title "The Moon Begs a New Gown", but in his case the moral given is that "the Humour of many People [is] to be perpetually Longing for something or other that's not to be had", since "there is no Measure to be taken of an Unsteady Mind". Later the fable was retold in Thomas James' Aesop's Fables (1851) and the compilations that followed it.

The fable's currency outside Britain is testified by an Italian version by Marcello Adriani the younger (1533–1604), later versified by the Rev. G. Bayley in his collection of 50 Fables for Little Folks versified from the Italian (Sydney, 1861). The fable is retold in only the first four lines of the poem, while the moral is drawn at length, based on Plutarch's account of the episode. Another versification was undertaken by Abraham Arouetty in his Fables in Verse Inspired by Aesop and La Fontaine (2000), whose rendering clarifies the lesson to be drawn:

Determine whether you are a new moon, a full moon or the form of a sickle,
But please, stop being so fickle.

Let me make a demand quite insistent:
Whatever you do, always be consistent.

Illustrations of the fable have been comparatively rare. They include those in colour by Arthur Rackham for the fable collection of V. S. Vernon Jones and those in black and white by Nora Fry for her own collection of Aesop's Fables (1930), in which the moral is given as "Changeable people are not easily satisfied".

A more recent American musical illustration of the fable occurs as a section of Liz Nedela's "Fables for Oboe and Piano".

A Serbian variant called "Why the Moon has no Dress", retold in verse form by Samuil Marshak in Russian, has the moon ordering a dress from a tailor, but each time the client comes for it, the clothing doesn't fit and has to be redone. Finally, the tailor gives up and runs away.

== See also ==
- The Weasel and Aphrodite
- Zeus and the Tortoise
- The Honest Woodcutter

== Bibliography ==
- Adrados, Francisco Rodríguez (1999). History of the Graeco-latin Fable: Inventory and documentation of the graeco. Leiden, the Netherlands: Brill Publications. ISBN 90-04-11891-8.
- Plutarch, Moralia. 16 vols. (vol. 13: 13.1 & 13.2, vol. 16: index), transl. by Frank Cole Babbitt (vol. 1–5) et al., series: "Loeb Classical Library" (LCL, vols. 197–499). Cambridge, Massachusetts: Harvard University Press et al., 1927–2004.
