= Zeus and the Tortoise =

Aesop's fable

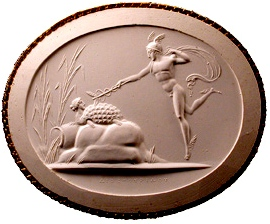
Hermes transforms the tortoise on a plaster cast of a Poniatowski gem

Zeus and the Tortoise appears among Aesop's Fables and explains how the tortoise got her shell. It is numbered 106 in the Perry Index. From it derives the proverbial sentiment that 'There's no place like home'.

== Home is best ==
The fable tells how the king of the gods invited all the animals to his wedding but the tortoise never arrived. When asked why, her excuse was that she preferred her own home, so Zeus made her carry her house about forever after.

That excuse in Greek was Οἶκος φίλος, οἶκος ἄριστος, literally 'the home you love is the best'. The fabulist then goes on to comment that 'most people prefer to live simply at home than to live lavishly at someone else's'. The saying became proverbial and was noticed as connected with the fable by Erasmus in his Adagia. The earliest English version of such a proverb, emerging in the 16th century, echoes the comment on the fable: "Home is home, though it's never so homely". The sentiment was eventually used as the second line in the popular song, "Home! Sweet Home!" (1823), which also features the equally proverbial "There's no place like home" in the chorus.

The first recorder of the fable was Cercidas some time in the 3rd century BCE. During the Renaissance it was retold in a mixture of Greek and Latin poetic lines by Barthélemy Aneau in his emblem book Picta Poesis (1552) and by Pantaleon Candidus in his Neo-Latin fable collection of 1604. Later it appeared in idiomatic English in Roger L'Estrange's Fables of Aesop (1692). Earlier, however, an alternative version of the story about the tortoise had been mentioned by the late 4th century CE author Servius in his commentary on Virgil's Aeneid. There it is a mountain nymph called Chelone (Χελώνη, the Greek for tortoise) who did not deign to be present at the wedding of Zeus. The divine messenger Hermes was then sent to throw her and her house into the river, where she was changed into the animal now bearing her name.

In the late 15th century, the Venetian Laurentius Abstemius created a Latin variant on the fable which was subsequently added to their fable collections by both Gabriele Faerno and by L'Estrange. It relates how, when the animals were invited to ask gifts of Zeus at the dawn of time, the snail petitioned for the ability to carry her home with her. Zeus asked if this would not be a troublesome burden, but the snail replied that she preferred this way of avoiding bad neighbours. Another fable attributed to Aesop is being alluded to here, number 100 in the Perry Index. In that story, Momus criticized the divine invention of a house as a gift to mankind because it did not have wheels so as to avoid troublesome neighbours. What was once a divine punishment of the tortoise, Abstemius now reveals as a blessing bestowed.

== See also ==
- The Moon and her Mother
- The Weasel and Aphrodite
