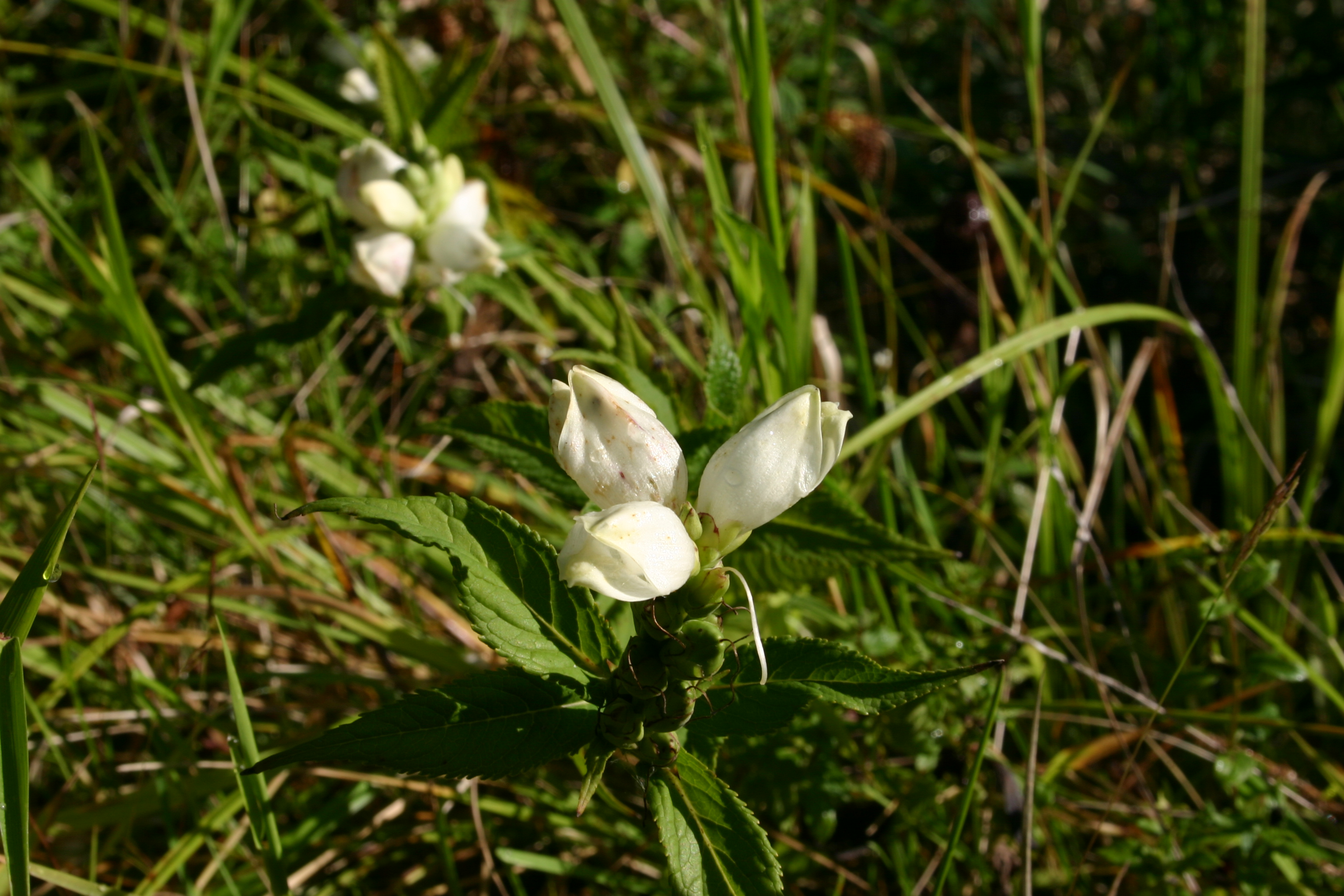
- Chelone glabra

Scientific classification
- Kingdom: Plantae
- Clade: Tracheophytes
- Clade: Angiosperms
- Clade: Eudicots
- Clade: Asterids
- Order: Lamiales
- Family: Plantaginaceae
- Tribe: Cheloneae
- Genus: Chelone; L.

Species
- Chelone cuthbertii; Chelone glabra; Chelone lyonii; Chelone obliqua

= Chelone (plant) =

Genus of flowering plants

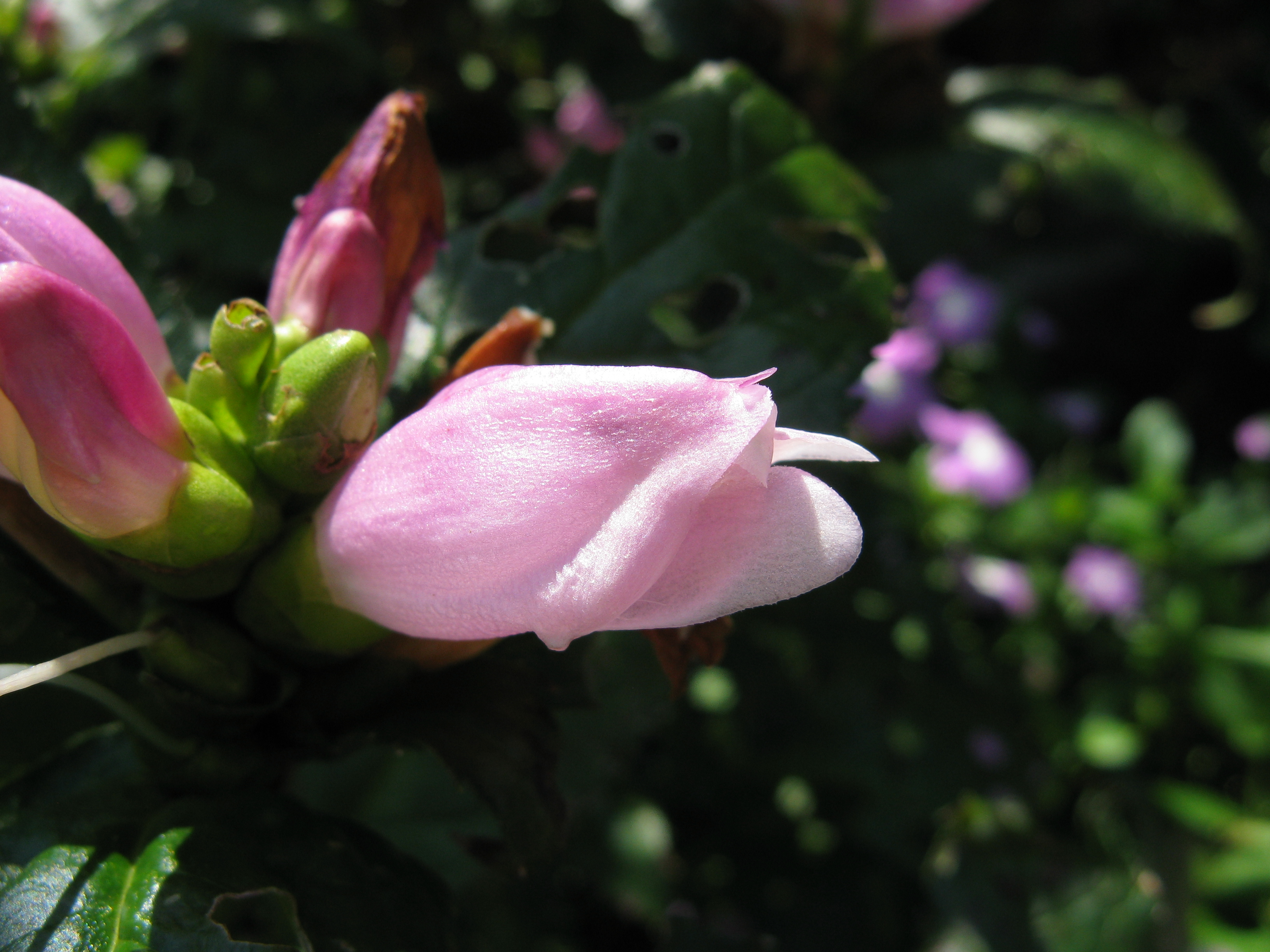
Chelone lyonii

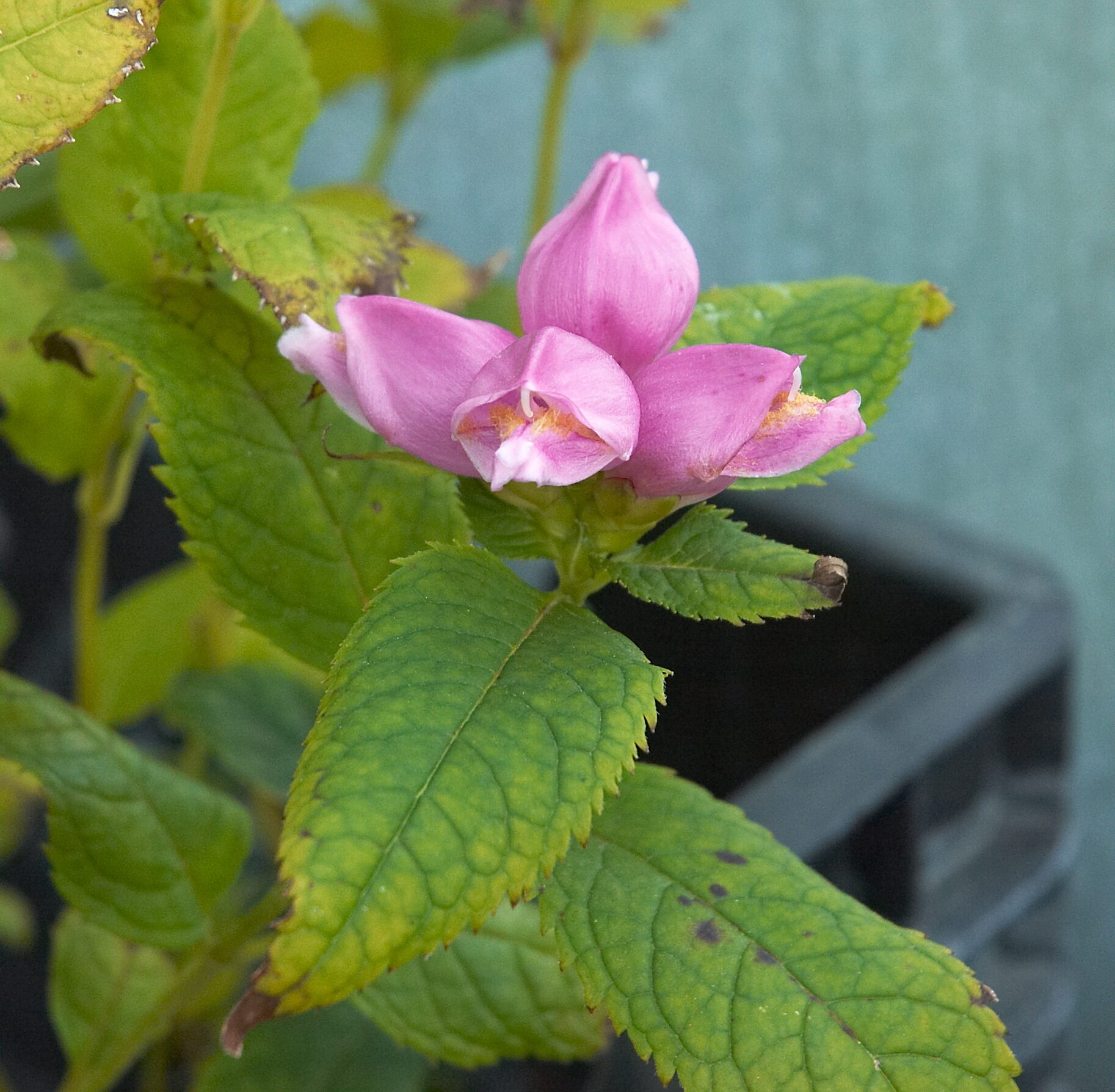
Chelone obliqua

Chelone is a genus of four species of perennial herbaceous plants native to eastern North America. They all have similarly shaped flowers (which led to the name turtlehead due to their resemblance to the head of a turtle), which vary in color from white to red, purple or pink. Chelone cuthbertii, C. glabra, and C. lyonii are diploid and C. obliqua is either tetraploid or hexaploid, depending on their slight differences in morphology and localities.

== Etymology ==
Chelone is derived from Greek meaning ‘turtle-like’, in reference to its turtle head-shaped corollas.

== Relationships to other plants ==
The closest relative of Chelone is Nothochelone from western North America. ^{[3]} ^{[6]} Nothochelone nemerosa is the species most closely related to the genus ^{[3] [6]}. Chelone is more closely related to it than to other members of the family such as snapdragons, plantains, and foxglove.

== Species ==
Chelone glabra is the most widely distributed species of the genus: from Georgia to Newfoundland and from Mississippi to Manitoba; ^{[5] [6]} the other three are found in more restricted areas.

Chelone cuthbertii is found in two areas: the Blue Ridge of North Carolina and the coastal plain of Virginia. ^{[5] [6]}

Chelone lyonii is found in the Blue Ridge of Tennessee, North Carolina, and South Carolina. ^{[5] [6]}

Chelone obliqua is found as tetraploids in the Blue Ridge, or hexaploids in two areas: Tennessee to Arkansas and Michigan, or the Atlantic coastal plain from South Carolina to Maryland. ^{[5] [6]}

The relationship between the different populations is complicated and it appears that C. obliqua in fact has arisen several times from diploid ancestors of the other three species. ^{[5] [6]} The four species seem to have diverged recently. ^{[5] [6]}
