= The Weasel and Aphrodite =

One of Aesop's Fables

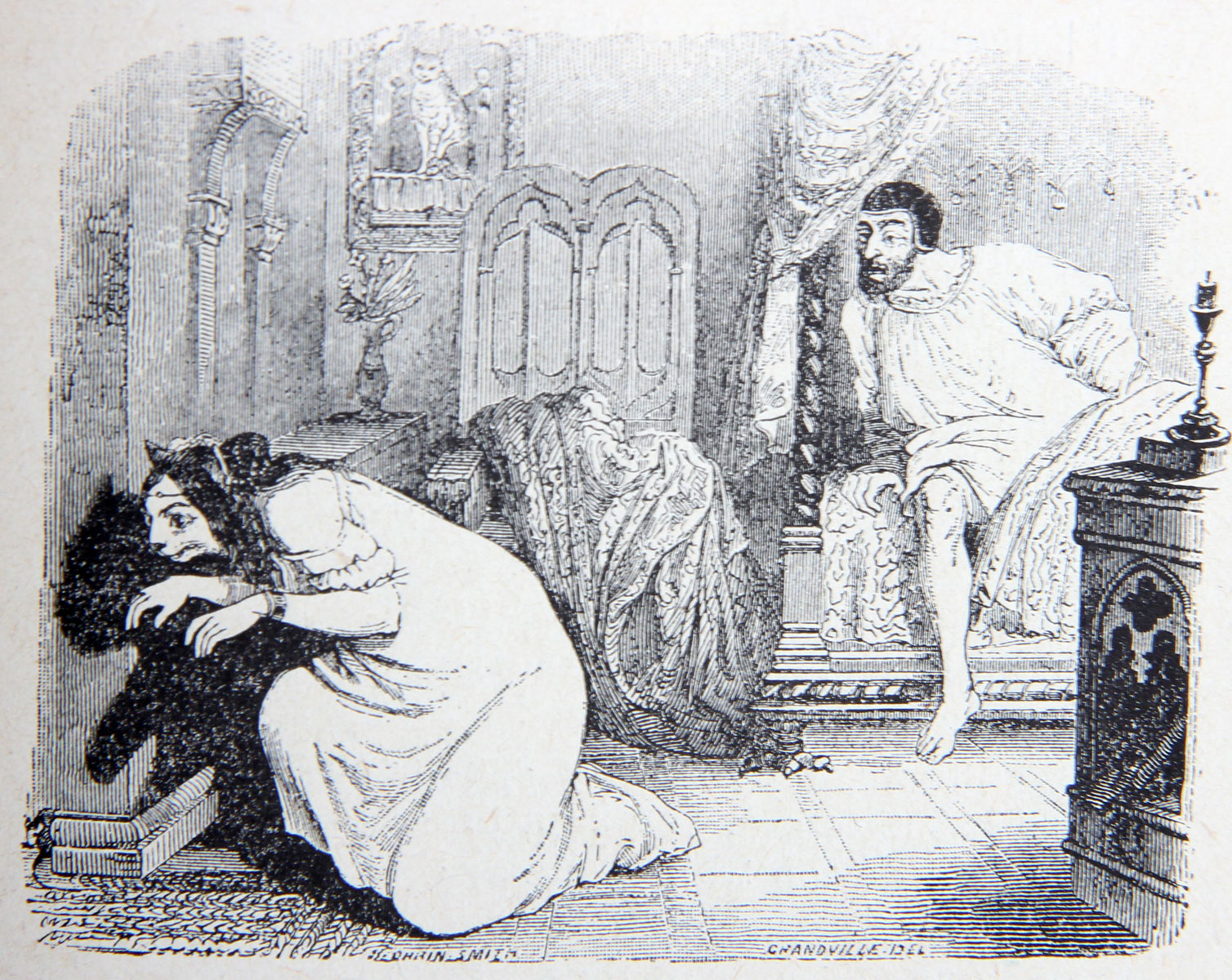
- Grandville's illustration to La Fontaine's fable

Folk tale
- Name: The Weasel and Aphrodite
- Also known as: The Cat and Aphrodite
- Aarne–Thompson grouping: ATU 212A (The Transformed Weasel)
- Mythology: Greek
- Region: Greece

The Weasel and Aphrodite (Note: Sometimes translated as a cat instead of a weasel.) (Ancient Greek: Γαλῆ καὶ Ἀφροδίτη, romanized: Galê kaì Aphrodítē), also known as Venus and the Cat, is one of Aesop's Fables, numbered 50 in the Perry Index. A fable on the cynical theme of the constancy of one's nature, it serves as a cautionary tale against trusting those with evil tempers, for even if they might change their body, they will not change their mind.

The fable has similar themes to the Indian tale of The Mouse Turned into a Maid, in which a mouse turns into a woman and marries a human male.

== The story ==
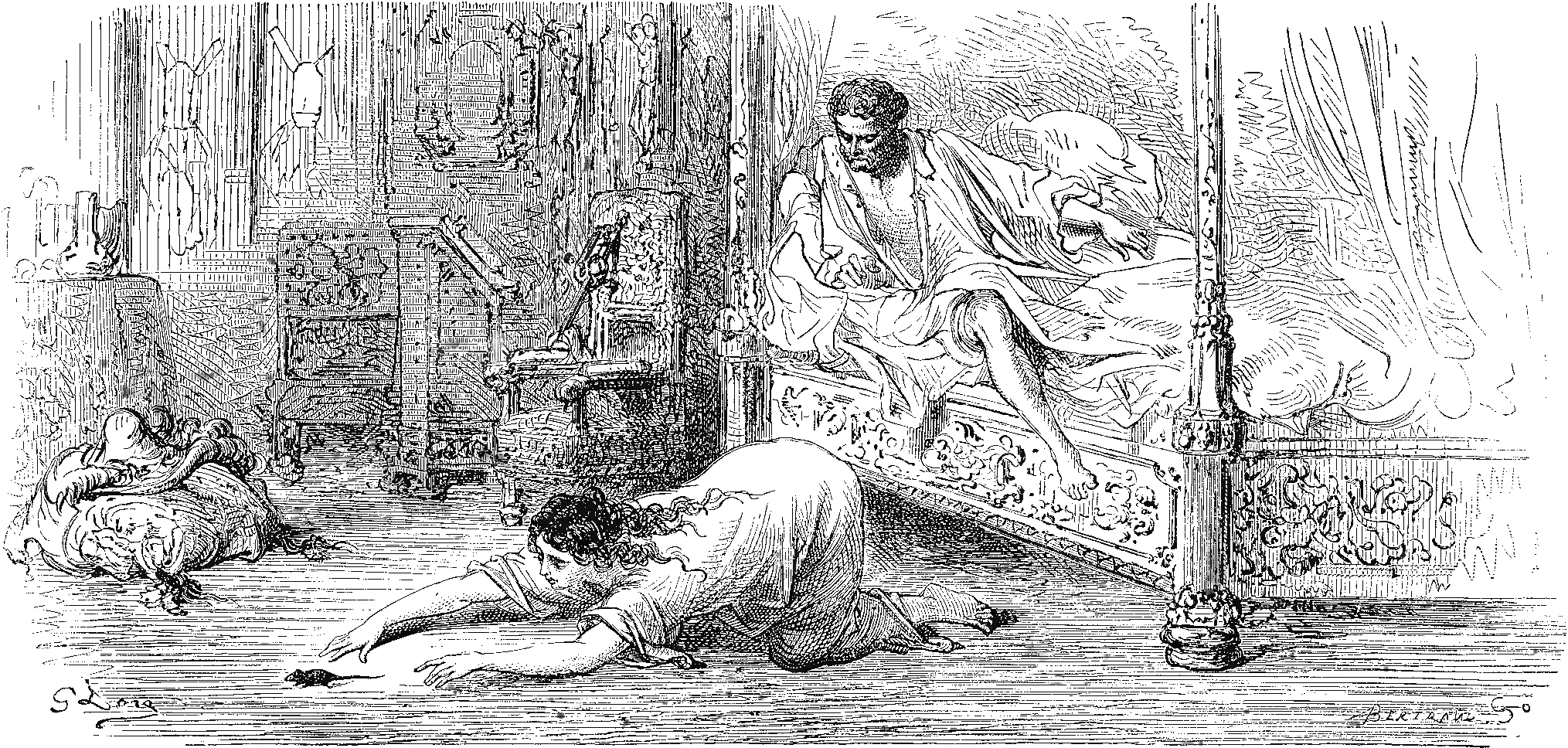
The maid chases the mouse.

A weasel fell in love with a young man, and begged the goddess of love, Aphrodite, to transform her into a human woman. Aphrodite, touched, did so, and turned the weasel into an exceedingly beautiful woman that every man would be lucky to have. The young man fell in love with the weasel, and soon they got married. As the woman sat in the nuptial bedroom, Aphrodite wished to test whether she truly was a human now or still retained an animal's nature at heart, so she released a mouse. Sure enough, the woman leapt out of the bed and caught the mouse to eat it. Aphrodite was angered, for she knew now that the weasel had not changed her ways at all upon becoming a woman. So, she turned her back into a weasel.

Babrius records a shorter version, in which the woman chases the mouse during the very nuptial feast, thus bringing the wedding to an end. Babrius does not state that Aphrodite released the mouse, instead writing that "[a]fter having played his little joke, Eros took his leave: Nature had proved stronger than Love."

To this is related an ancient Greek idiom related by Zenobius, "the wedding dress does not fit the weasel", which directly references the Aesopian fable; compare the modern Greek word for weasel, νυφίτσα, which literally translates to "little bride".

== Other versions ==
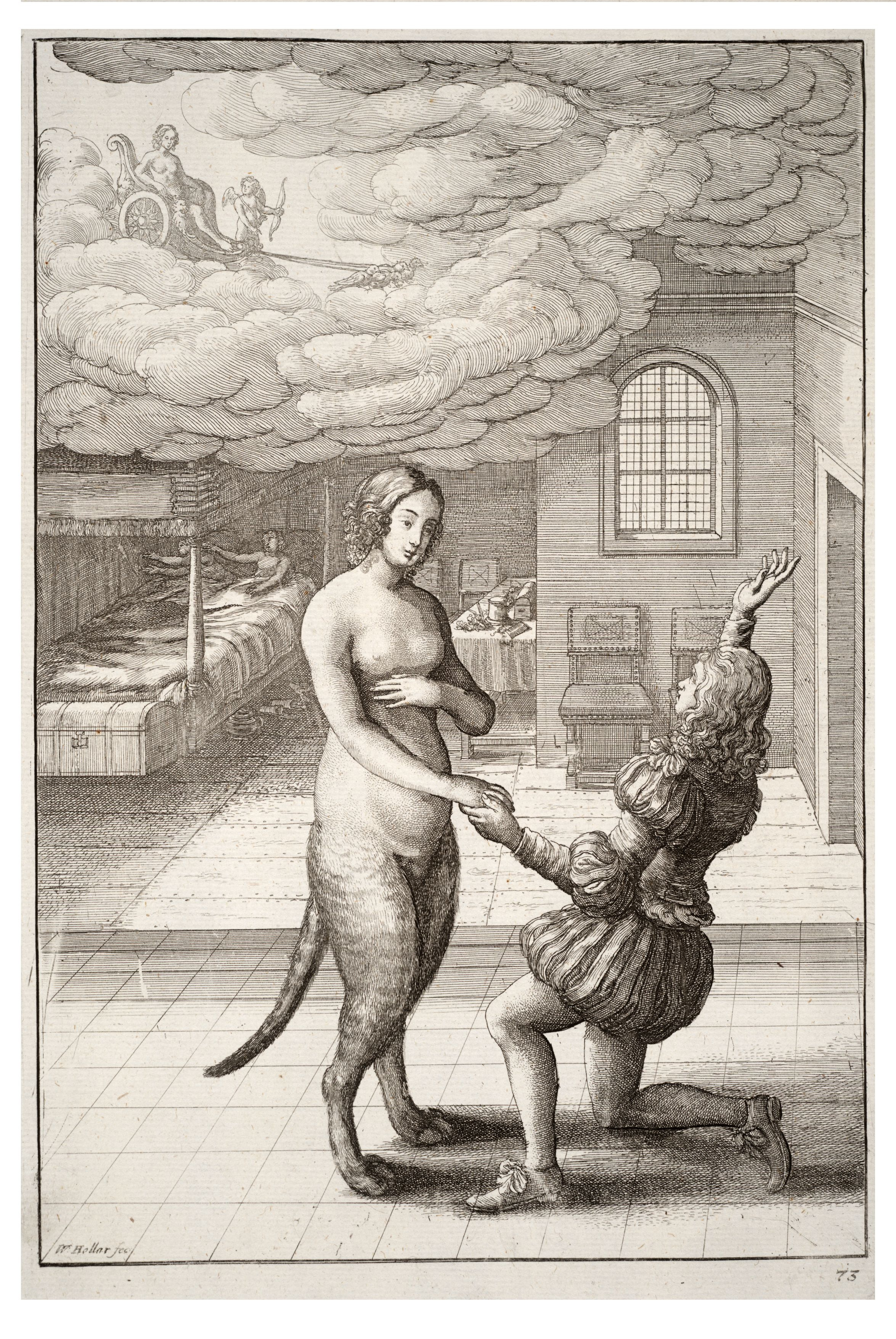
Cat becomes a woman by Wenceslas Hollar, 1668

When the fable was related by Hieronymus Osius in a Neo-Latin poem, nearly half of it was taken up by a consideration of basic unchangeability, the sense being echoed by internal rhyme and assonance: "Difficult to elicit, illicit,/ change where nature's innate". During the troubled political situation at the time the edition of Aesop's fables illustrated by Francis Barlow was published, Aphra Behn gave a sly Royalist tilt to her summing up of the tale's meaning: "Ill principles no mercy can reclaime,/ And once a Rebell still will be the same". In both these versions a young man besotted with his pet cat prays to the goddess to make the change so that they can marry. The fable in the Barlow volume also has two different titles. On the illustration appears the English "The young man and his cat", while in the Latin explanatory text it reads De Cata in Fœminam mutate (The cat changed into a woman).

Jean de la Fontaine wrote a separate version of this fable, also under the title "The cat changed into a woman" (La chatte metamorphosée en femme, II.18), in which he gave the theme of change an extended, thoughtful treatment:

So great is stubborn nature's force.
In mockery of change, the old
Will keep their youthful bent.
When once the cloth has got its fold,
The smelling-pot its scent,
In vain your efforts and your care
To make them other than they are.
To work reform, do what you will,
Old habit will be habit still.

Though La Fontaine avoided mention of Venus as the intermediary for the change in his fable, she is there in Christopher Pitt's "The Fable of the Young Man and his Cat", which is turned into a satirical picture of womanhood. Except in the one important respect, the transformed cat accorded to the 18th-century social norm and

From a grave thinking Mouser, she was grown
The gayest Flirt that coach'd it round the Town.

Her reversion to cathood is interpreted by Pitt as a return to innate femininity; the foolish man is jilted by her, rather than she being punished by the goddess.

== Artistic versions ==
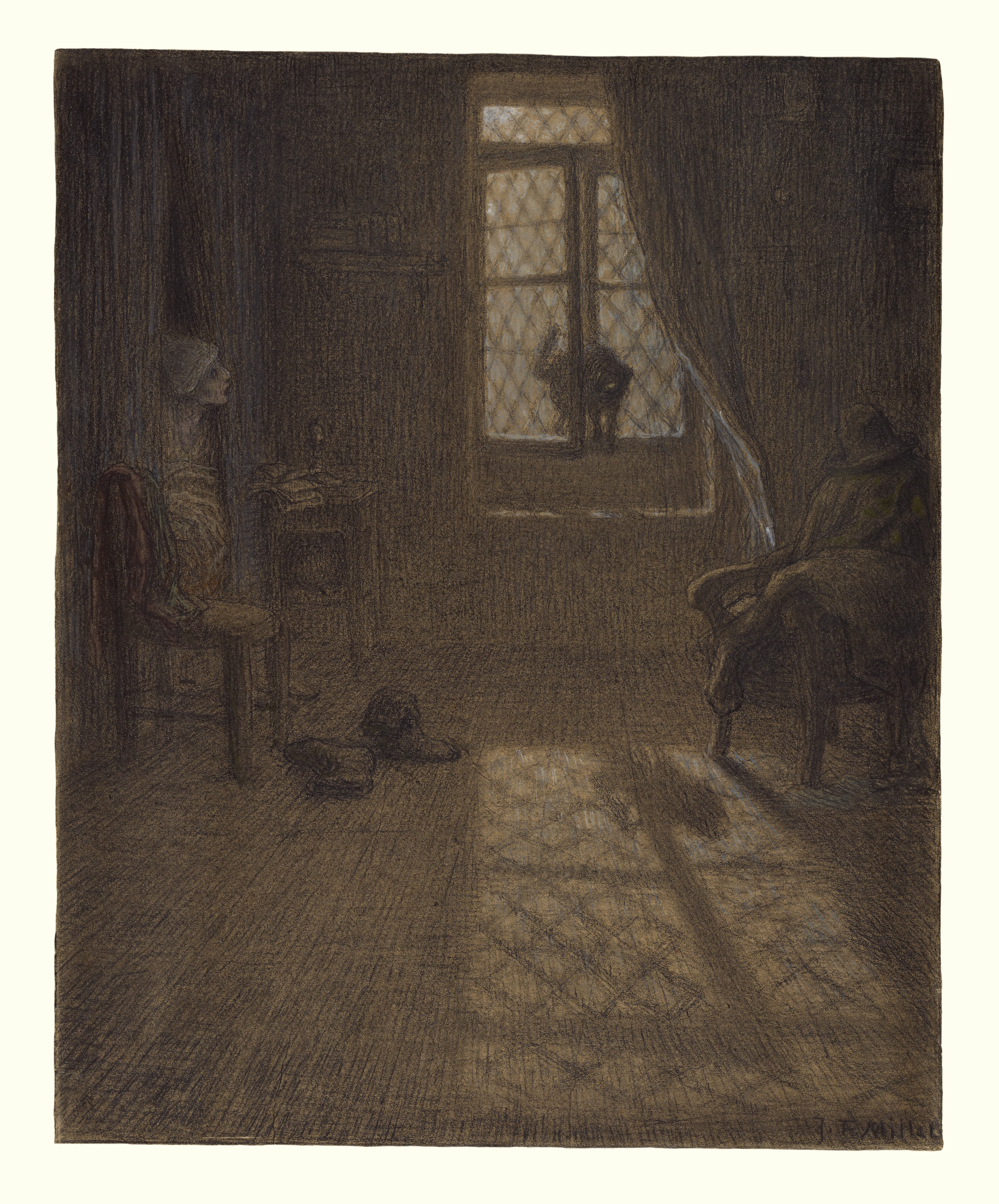
Jean-François Millet's drawing of The Cat Changed into a Woman

La Fontaine's fable also received musical treatments which reinterpreted the basic story. Jacques Offenbach's one-act operetta La Chatte Metamorphosée en Femme (1858) verges on farce. A financially ruined reclusive bachelor is pursued by his female cousin. With the help of a Hindu fakir, she makes him believe that she is the reincarnation of the pet cat with which he is besotted. Its happy ending is reversed in Henri Sauguet's popular ballet La Chatte (1927). Here the goddess Aphrodite turns the woman back into a cat again after she leaves her lover to chase a mouse and he dies of disappointment. There had in fact been a much earlier ballet of La chatte metamorphosée en femme, with music by Alexandre Montfort and choreography by Jean Coralli. This was first performed in 1837 with the Austrian dancer Fanny Elssler in the lead role. Not only did the work inspire Offenbach to write his opera but it was also indirectly responsible for Frederick Ashton's late ballet of that name, created in 1985 for a gala in honour of Fanny Elssler in Vienna. Then in 1999 the French composer Isabelle Aboulker set La Fontaine's fable for piano and soprano as one of the four in her Femmes en fables.

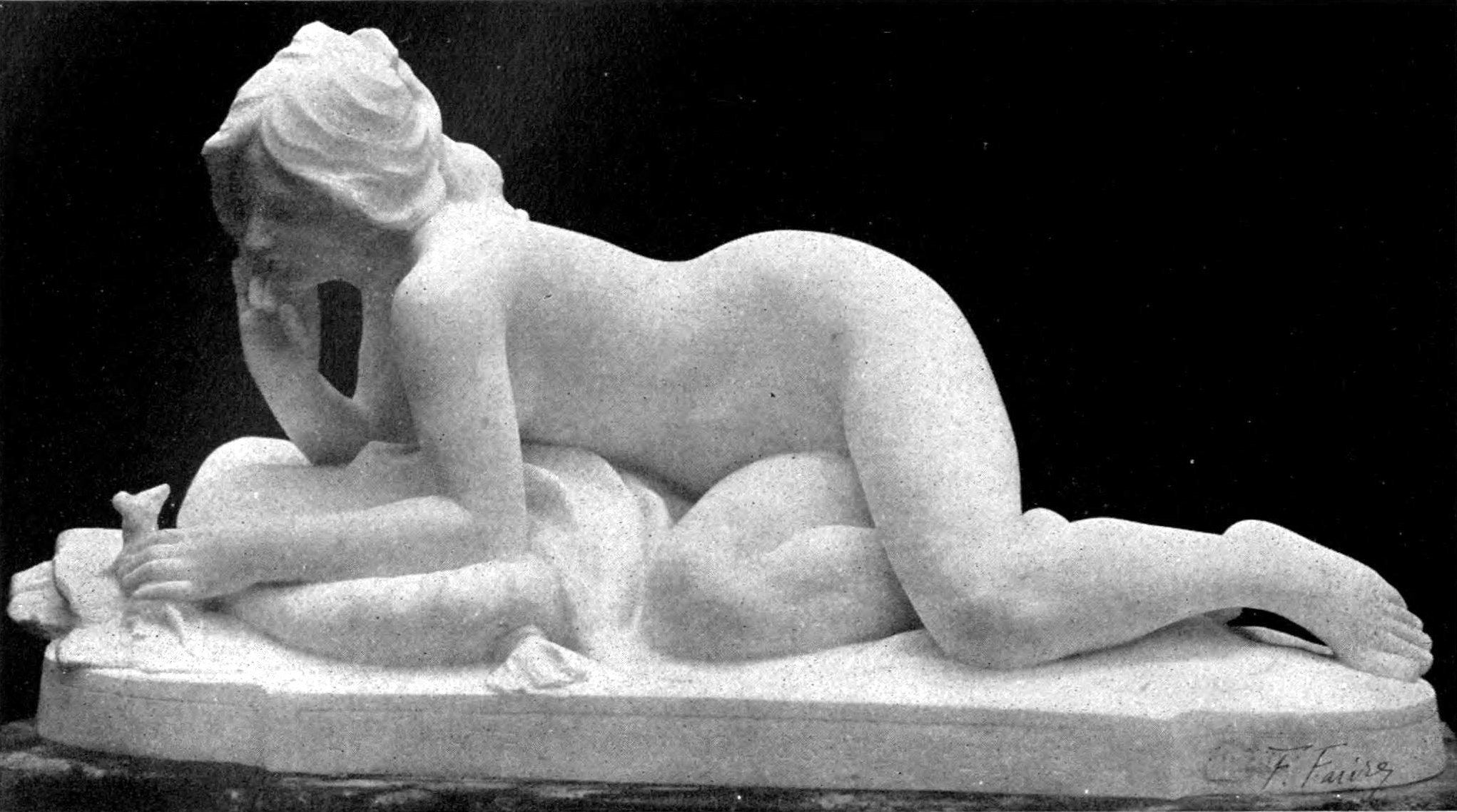
Sculpture of Jean de la Fontaine's "The Cat changed into a Woman" by Ferdinand Faivre.

Interpretations in the Fine Arts include Millet's chalk and pastel drawing of the fable (c. 1858) in which a black cat with shining eyes enters and looks toward a startled man who pokes his head through the bed curtains (see opposite). This was followed by an Art Nouveau marble sculpture exhibited in 1908 by Ferdinand Faivre in which the woman seems more to be contemplating and stroking the mouse than hunting it. Later the subject featured as Plate 25 in Marc Chagall's etchings of La Fontaine's fables in which a figure with the head of a cat but the well-developed body of a woman looks out from the picture while leaning on a small table. Four centuries earlier Wenceslas Hollar had also pictured the transformation scene halfway through in his illustration for John Ogilby's The Fables of Aesop (1668).

Chagall's print, in its turn, inspired a poem by American poet Patricia Fargnoli. Published in her collection Small Songs of Pain (2003), it considers what the physical process of changing into a woman must have felt like. With its concentration on the woman's sexual characteristics, it takes us full circle to François Chauveau's copper engraving in the first edition of La Fontaine's Fables (1668), which suggests that the hunt for the mouse takes place immediately following the act of love. This underlines the character of Aphrodite's test of the woman and explains the love-goddess's judgement in turning her back to her original form.

== See also ==
- Zeus and the Tortoise
- The Honest Woodcutter
- The North Wind and the Sun
- Animal as Bridegroom
- Swan maiden

== Bibliography ==
- Adrados, Francisco Rodríguez (1999). History of the Graeco-latin Fable: Inventory and documentation of the graeco. Leiden, the Netherlands: Brill Publications. ISBN 90-04-11891-8.
- Hansen, William (2019). The Book of Greek and Roman Folktales, Legends, and Myths. Princeton and Oxford: Princeton University Press. ISBN 978-0-691-19592-6.
- Johnston, Patricia A.; Mastrocinque, Attilio; Papaioannou, Sophia (2016). Animals in Greek and Roman Religion and Myth. Cambridge Scholars Publishing. ISBN 978-1-4438-9487-6.
