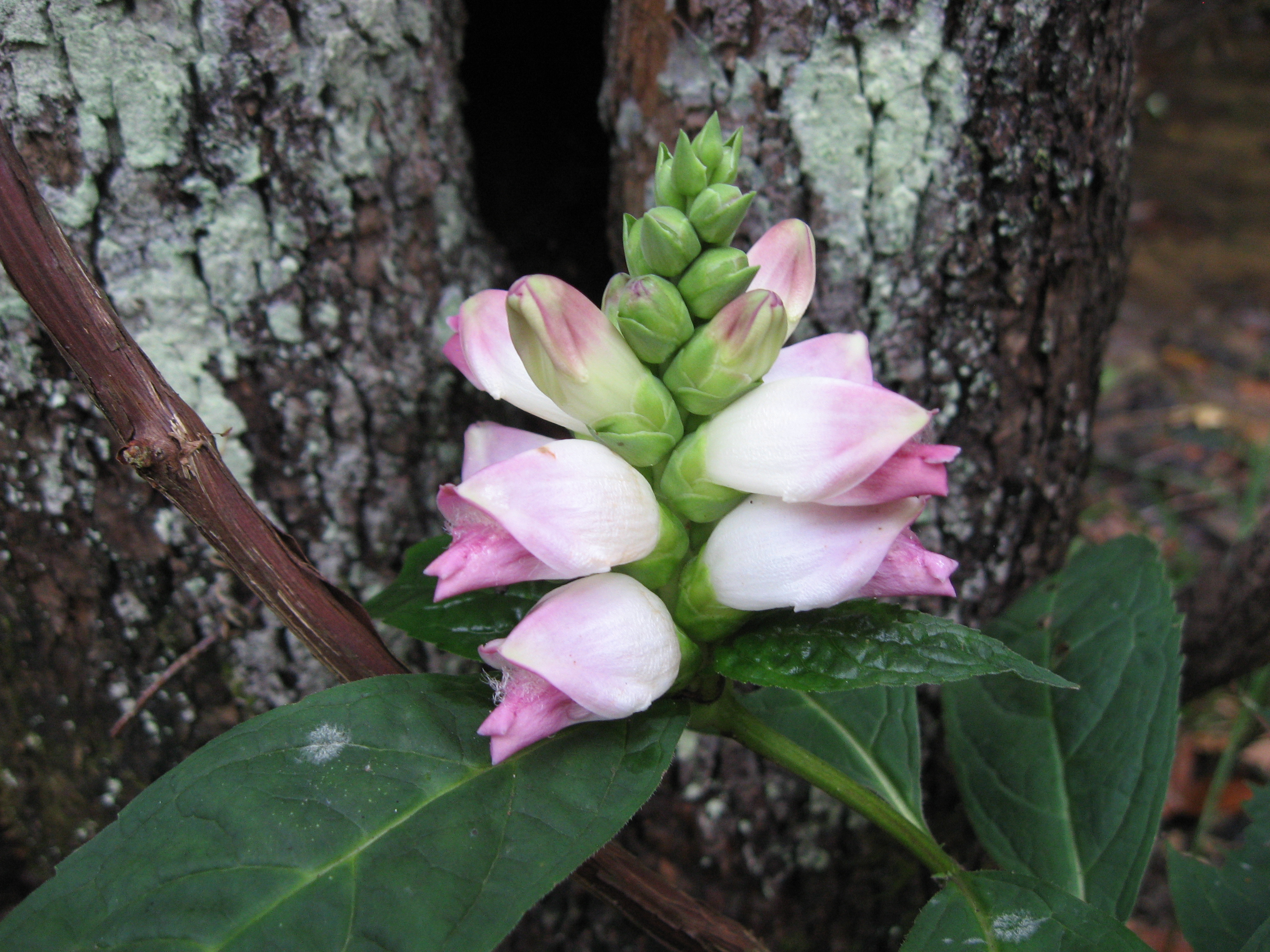
- Flowers

Conservation status
- Secure (NatureServe)

Scientific classification
- Kingdom: Plantae
- Clade: Tracheophytes
- Clade: Angiosperms
- Clade: Eudicots
- Clade: Asterids
- Order: Lamiales
- Family: Plantaginaceae
- Genus: Chelone
- Species: C. glabra

Binomial name
- Chelone glabra L.

= Chelone glabra =

White turtlehead or balmony

Species of flowering plant

Chelone glabra, or white turtlehead, is a herbaceous species of plant native to North America. Its native range extends from Georgia to Newfoundland and Labrador and from Mississippi to Manitoba. Its common name comes from the appearance of its flower petals, which resemble the head of a tortoise. In fact, in Greek, chelone means "tortoise" and was the name of a nymph who refused to attend the wedding of Zeus and was turned into a turtle as punishment. Its natural habitat is wet areas, such as riparian forests and swamps.

Its classification at the family level has in the past been controversial, but as a result of DNA sequence studies, it is now regarded as belonging to family Plantaginaceae (the plantain family). In early taxonomic treatments the species was divided into a number of subspecific categories but more recent studies indicate no morphological or genetic basis for these taxonomic categories.

== Description and ecology ==
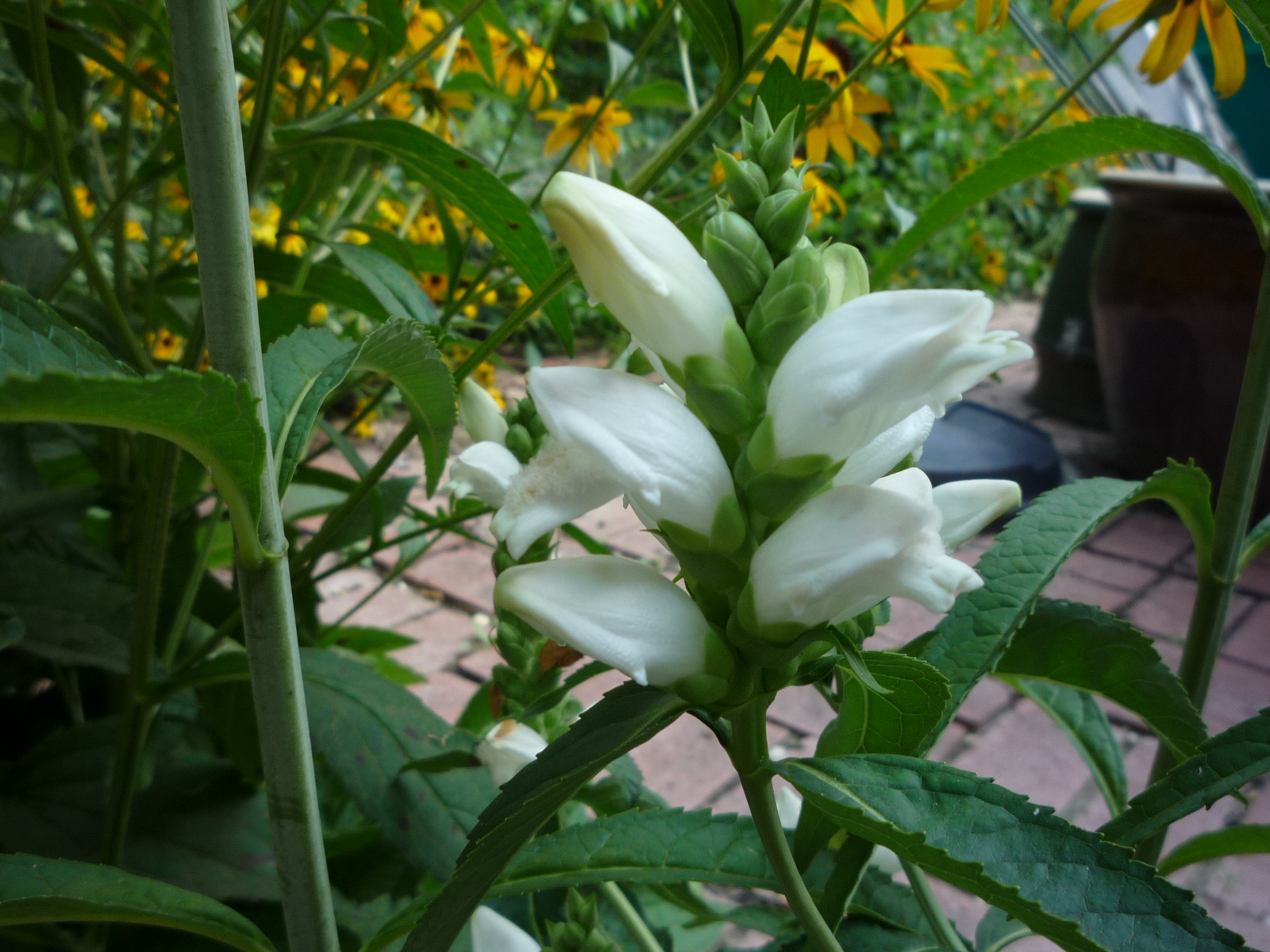

This species has opposite, simple leaves, on stout, upright stems. The flowers are white, borne in late summer and early fall.

It is the primary plant on which the Baltimore checkerspot butterfly will lay its eggs (although the butterfly to some extent will use a few other species).

Chelone glabra is a popular browse plant for deer. It is also a foodplant for the sawflies Macrophya nigra and Tenthredo grandis (Hymenoptera: Tenthredinidae), and a flea beetle in the genus Dibolia (Coleoptera: Chrysomelidae) has also been shown to feed on it.

== Uses ==
It has been used as a method of birth control by Abenaki people.
