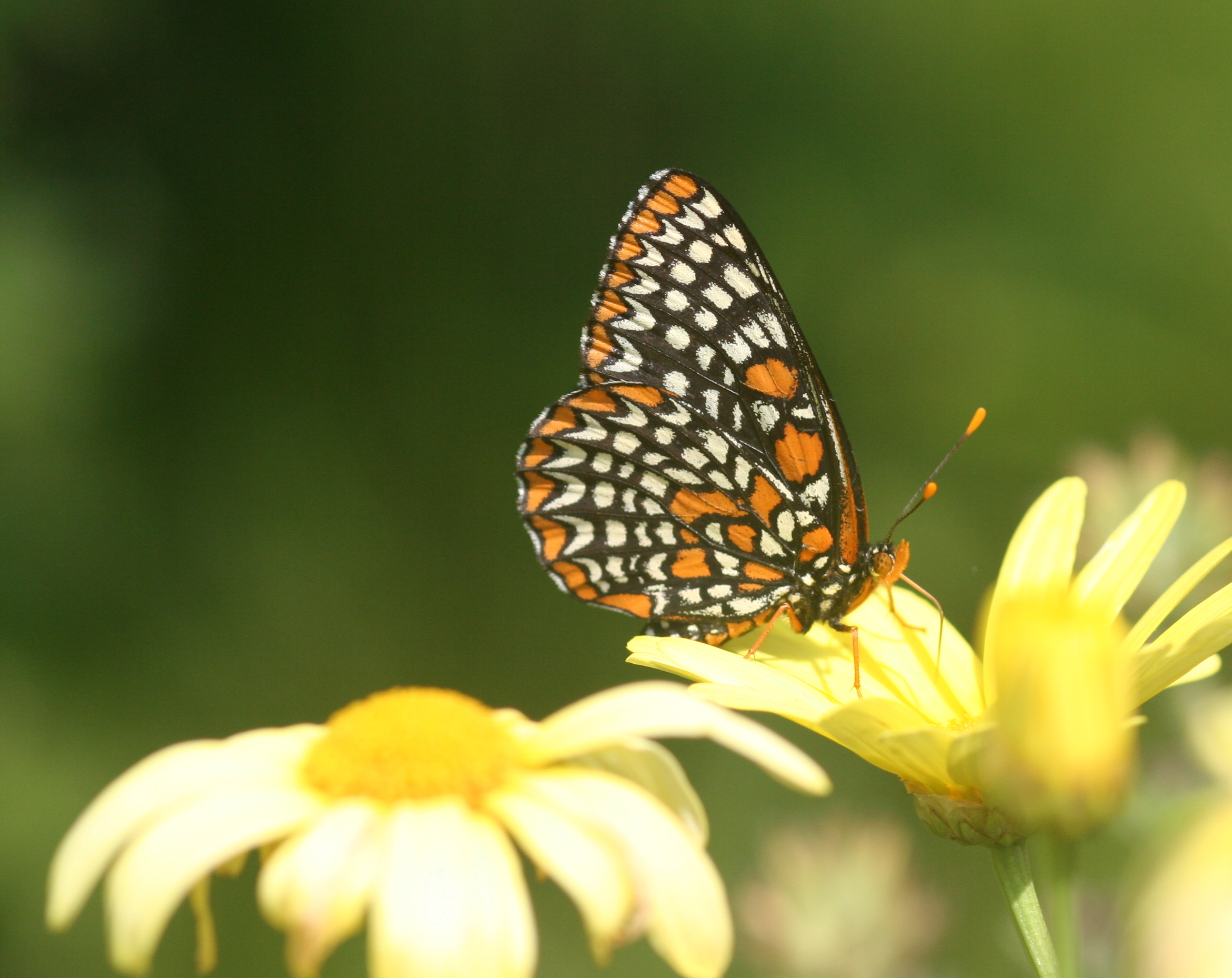
- E. phaeton on Argyranthemum

Conservation status
- Apparently Secure (NatureServe)

Scientific classification
- Kingdom: Animalia
- Phylum: Arthropoda
- Clade: Pancrustacea
- Class: Insecta
- Order: Lepidoptera
- Family: Nymphalidae
- Genus: Euphydryas
- Species: E. phaeton

Binomial name
- Euphydryas phaeton (Drury, 1773)

= Baltimore checkerspot =

Species of butterfly

The Baltimore checkerspot (Euphydryas phaeton) is a North American butterfly of the family Nymphalidae. It is distributed from Canada and the Great Lakes, across the Northeastern United States, and south in the Appalachians. It requires scarce early successional wet meadow habitat. In Maryland, where its association with Lord Baltimore's colors led to recognition as the state insect in 1973, it has declined to the point of being listed as an endangered species.

== Life cycle ==
During its period of growth, the checkerspot butterfly will search for a host plant for nourishment. Its native larval host is the white turtle head (Chelone glabra), but it has also to some extent made use of the introduced lawn weed English plantain (Plantago lanceolata) and other plants.

Unlike most butterflies and moths, which overwinter as eggs, pupae, or sometimes adults, the Baltimore checkerspot overwinters as larvae. In late summer (sometime in July through September depending on latitude, weather, and other factors) the larvae spin a pre-hibernation web on a plant, stop feeding, and remain in the web. Several months later they leave this web and enter the litter (dead grass and leaves and so on) on the ground, where they spend the winter.

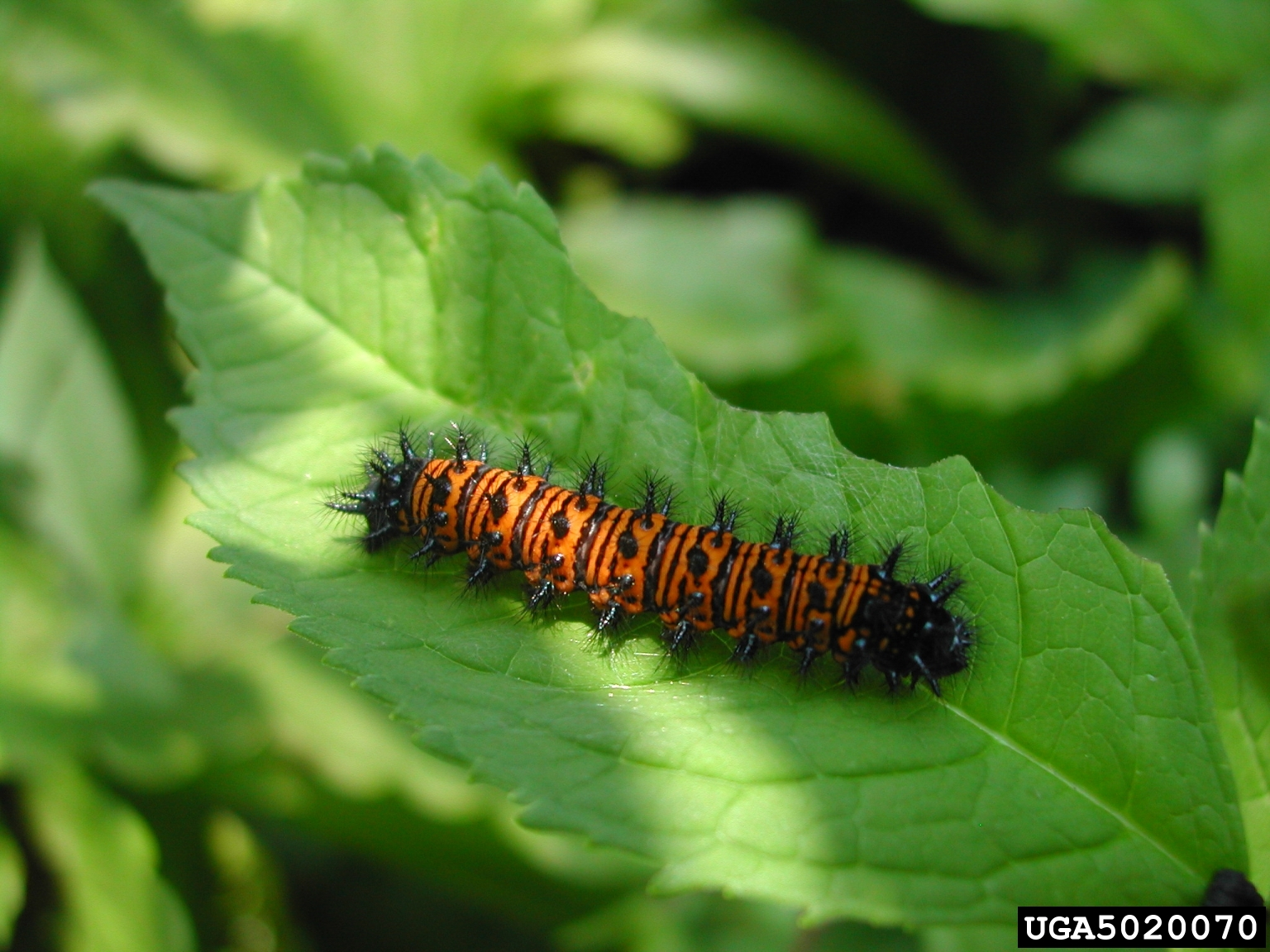
Caterpillar

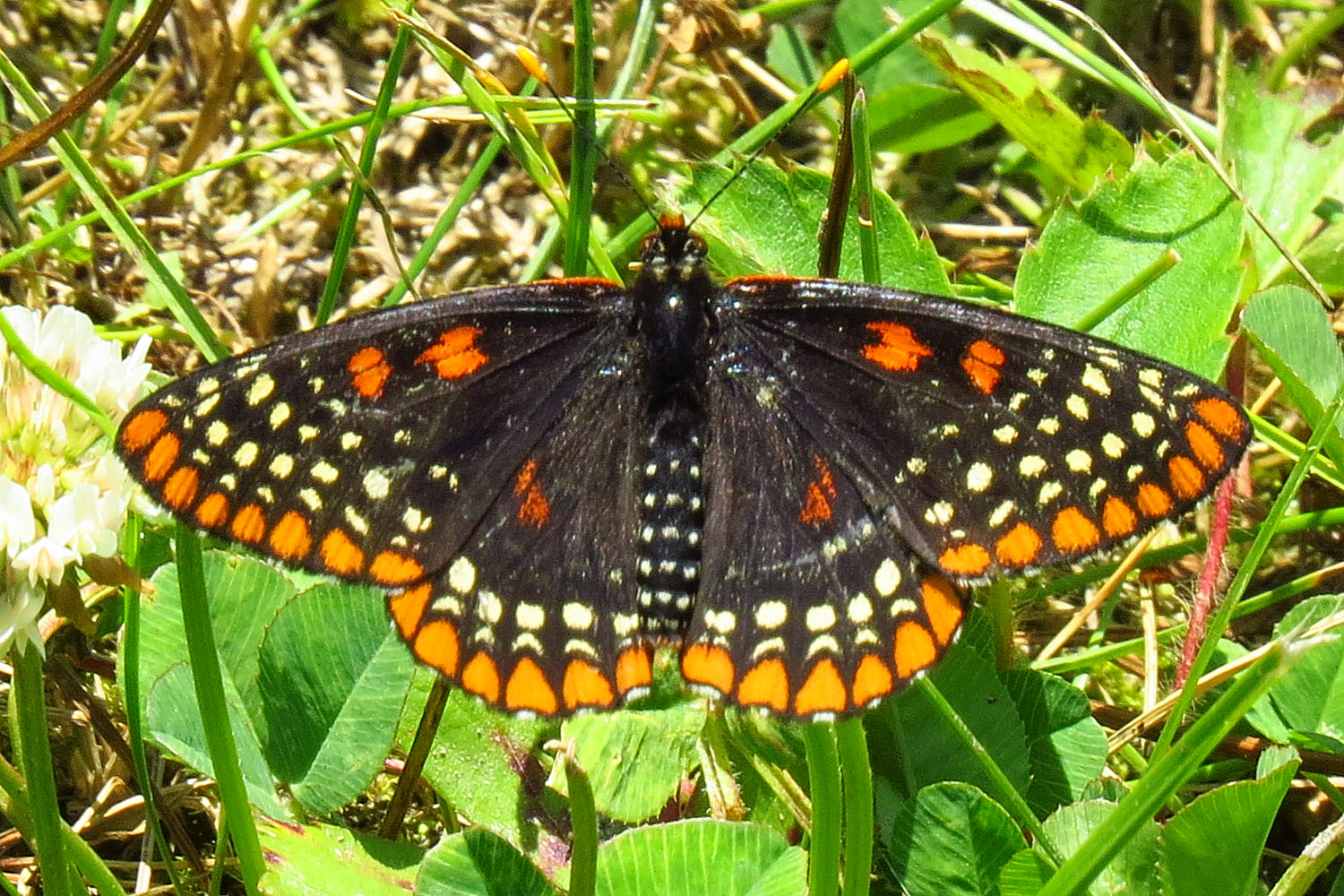
Adult, Ottawa, Ontario

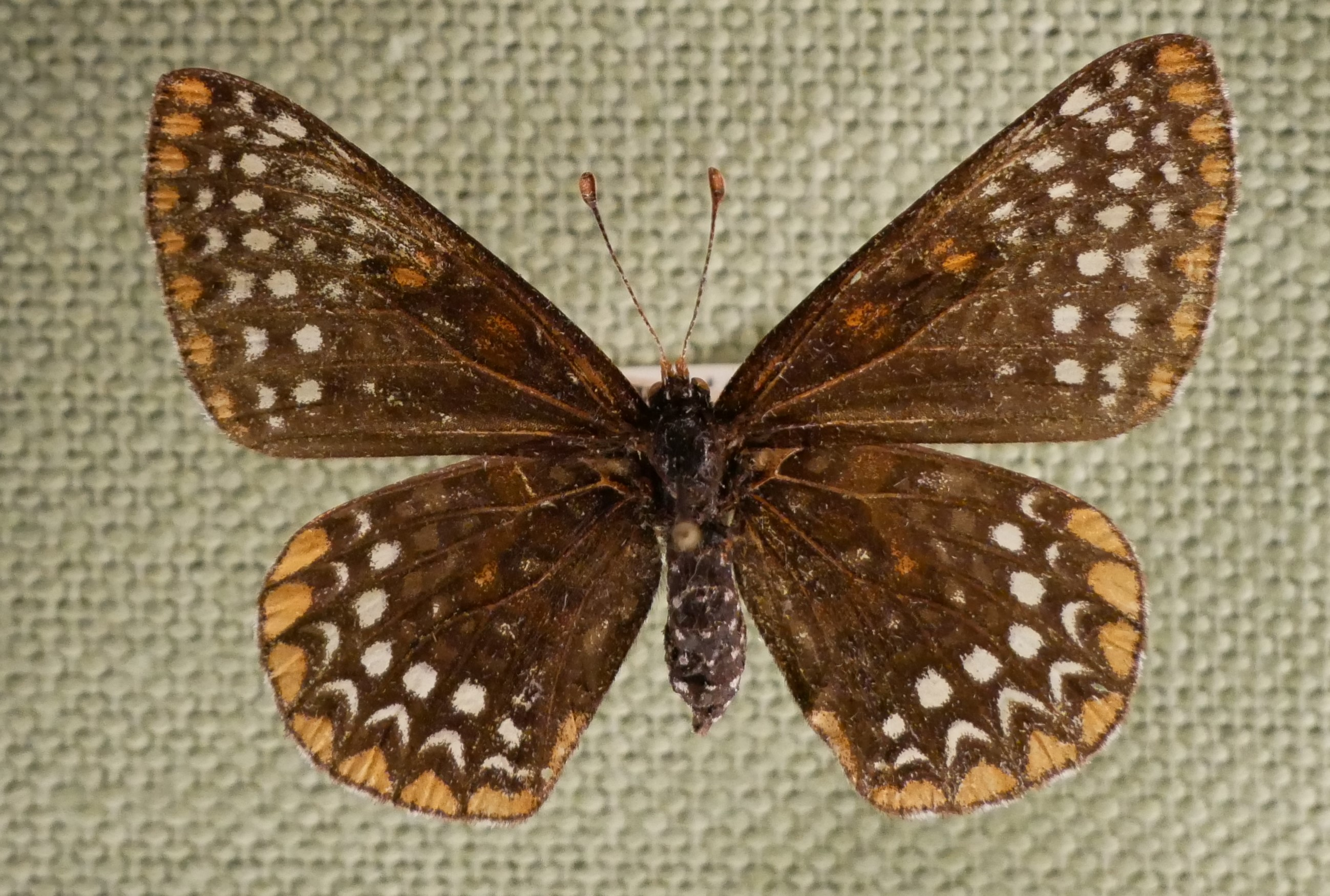
Museum specimen
