= Chelone (mythology) =

Ancient Greek tortoise nymph

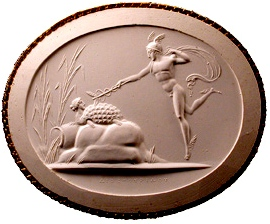
Hermes transforms Chelone into a tortoise, plaster cast of a Poniatowski gem.

In Greek mythology and folklore, Chelone (Ancient Greek: Χελώνη, romanized: Khelṓnē, lit. 'tortoise, turtle') is an insolent nymph who lived by a running river. Chelone is notable for her transformation myth into a tortoise, an animal that lives in the shell it constantly carries, after refusing to leave her house to attend Zeus' wedding. The myth is known through the works of several authors, including Aesop, and probably originated from one of his fables.

== Etymology ==
The noun χελώνη is the ancient Greek word for both the land tortoise and the sea turtle. Traditionally the word is considered to derive from an Indo-European root *gʰel(H)-ewH- denoting turtles and tortoises, however it has also been suggested that it must be a loanword from a non-Indo-European language, a theory that Beekes supports.

== Mythology ==
According to Servius, the myth goes that when all the gods, men, and animals were invited by the divine messenger Hermes to attend the wedding of the king and queen of the gods, Zeus and Hera, the river-dwelling nymph Chelone alone remained at home, to show her disregard of the solemnity. But Hermes then descended from Mount Olympus, threw Chelone's house, which stood on the bank of a river, together with the nymph, into the water and transformed her into a lazy tortoise, who had henceforth to carry her house on her back. The Vatican Mythographers recorded the same version.

Aesop's fable Zeus and the Tortoise follows the same premise, where the king of the gods invited all the animals to his wedding but the tortoise never arrived. When asked why, her excuse was that she preferred her own home, so Zeus made her carry her house about forever after in punishment.

According to the traveller Pausanias, the mountain near Mount Cyllene in which Hermes fashioned a harp out of a tortoise's shell was called Chelydorea, meaning "flayed tortoise".

== Interpretation ==
Servius' account was probably developed from the Aesopic fable and was likely intended for children.

== See also ==
- Myrina
- Myrmex
- Arsinoe
- Rhodopis and Euthynicus
