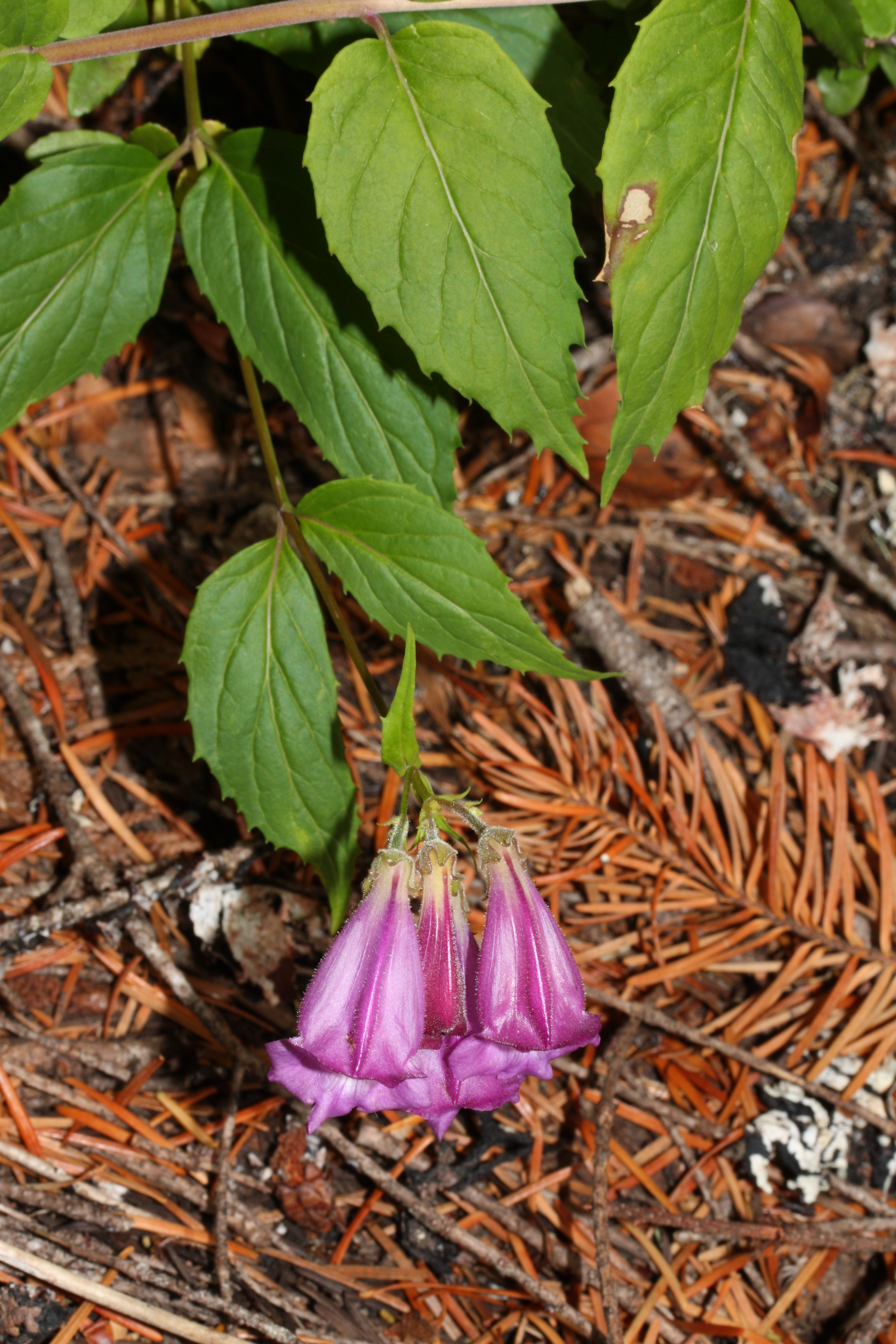
- Nothochelone nemorosa in Mount Rainier National Park

Scientific classification
- Kingdom: Plantae
- Clade: Tracheophytes
- Clade: Angiosperms
- Clade: Eudicots
- Clade: Asterids
- Order: Lamiales
- Family: Plantaginaceae
- Tribe: Cheloneae
- Genus: Nothochelone (A.Gray) Straw
- Species: N. nemorosa

Binomial name
- Nothochelone nemorosa (Dougl. ex Lindl.) Straw

Synonyms
- Penstemon nemorosus

= Nothochelone =

Genus of flowering plants

Nothochelone is a monotypic genus of flowering plants in the plantain family containing the single species Nothochelone nemorosa, which is known by the common name woodland beardtongue. Originally described as Penstemon nemorosus, the plant is very similar in appearance to the penstemons, but was placed into its own genus on the basis of slight morphological differences, such as winged seeds.

Nothochelone is native to western North America from British Columbia to northern California, where it grows in mountain forests. It is a perennial herb producing an erect, hairy stem up to a meter tall from a caudex. The oppositely arranged leaves are lance-shaped to oval, pointed, toothed, and up to 14 centimeters long. The inflorescence is a panicle of flowers resembling penstemons, widely tubular with two lobed lips and a hairy staminode. The flower may exceed 3 centimeters in length and is light to dark pink in color. The fruit is a capsule containing the small winged seeds.
