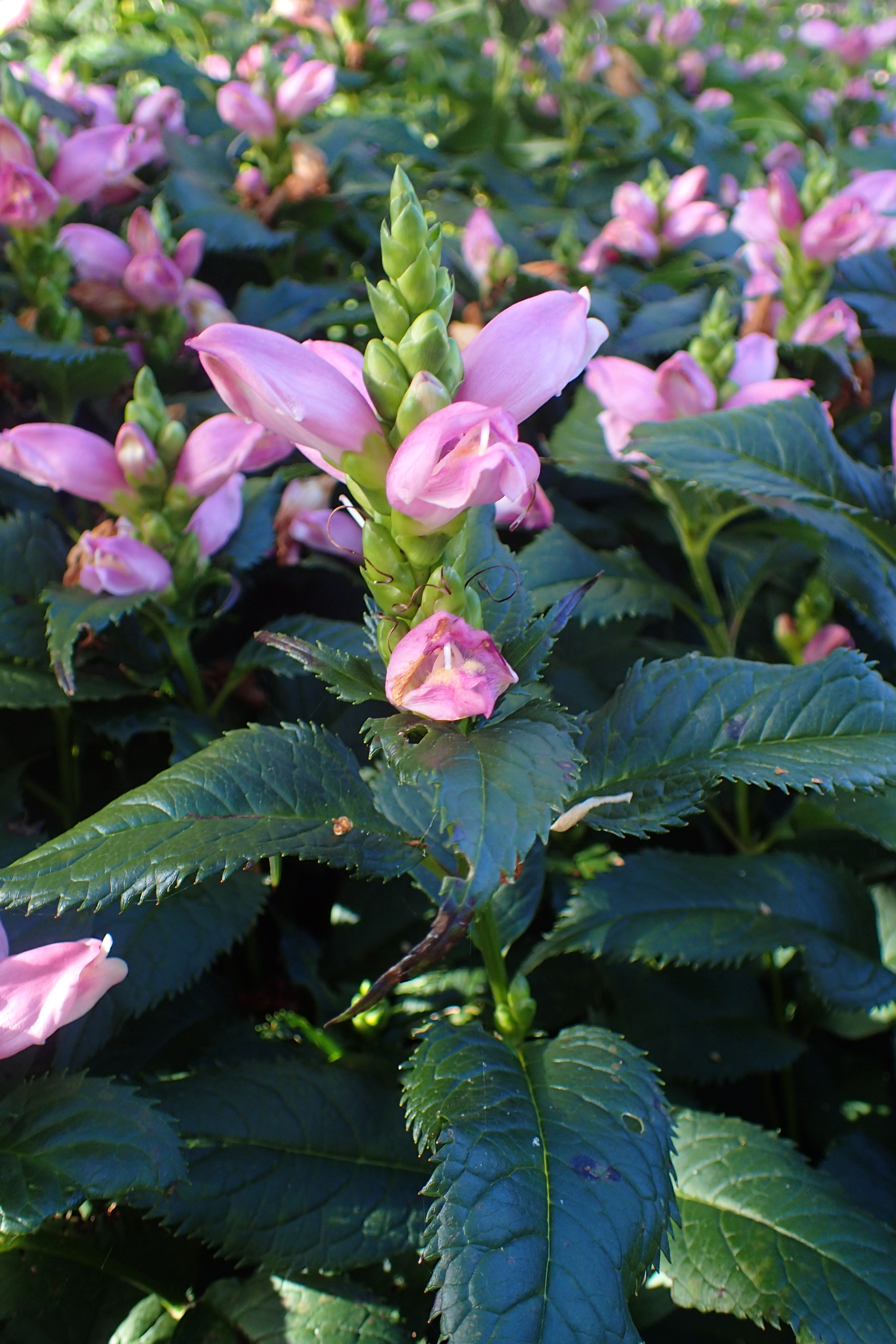
- At the Chicago Botanic Garden
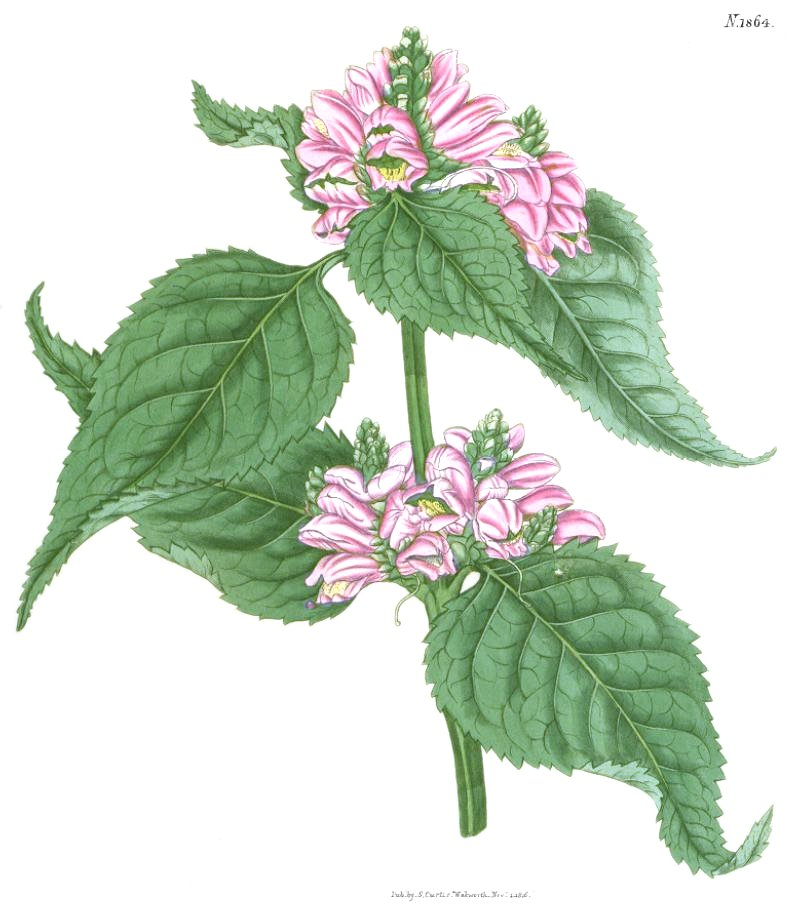
- Botanical illustration

Scientific classification
- Kingdom: Plantae
- Clade: Tracheophytes
- Clade: Angiosperms
- Clade: Eudicots
- Clade: Asterids
- Order: Lamiales
- Family: Plantaginaceae
- Genus: Chelone
- Species: C. lyonii

Binomial name
- Chelone lyonii Pursh

Synonyms
- Chelone latifolia Muhl. ex Elliott; Chelone lyonii f. latifolia (Muhl. ex Elliott) Pennell & Wherry; Chelone major Sims

= Chelone lyonii =

Species of flowering plant

Chelone lyonii, the pink turtlehead or Lyon's shell flower, is a species of flowering plant in the family Plantaginaceae. It is native to wet areas of the southern Appalachian Mountains of the United States. A deer-tolerant perennial, it is hardy in USDA zones 3 through 8, and is recommended for shady and wet situations, although it can handle full sun. The unimproved species and a number of cultivars are commercially available, including 'Hot Lips' and 'Pink Temptation'. Its cultivar 'Armitpp02' is sold under the trade designation Tiny Tortuga.
