= Ferdinand Faivre =

French sculptor

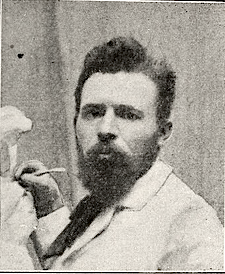

Ferdinand Faivre (1860–1937) was a French sculptor whose work is often characterised by the Art Nouveau style.

== Life and work ==
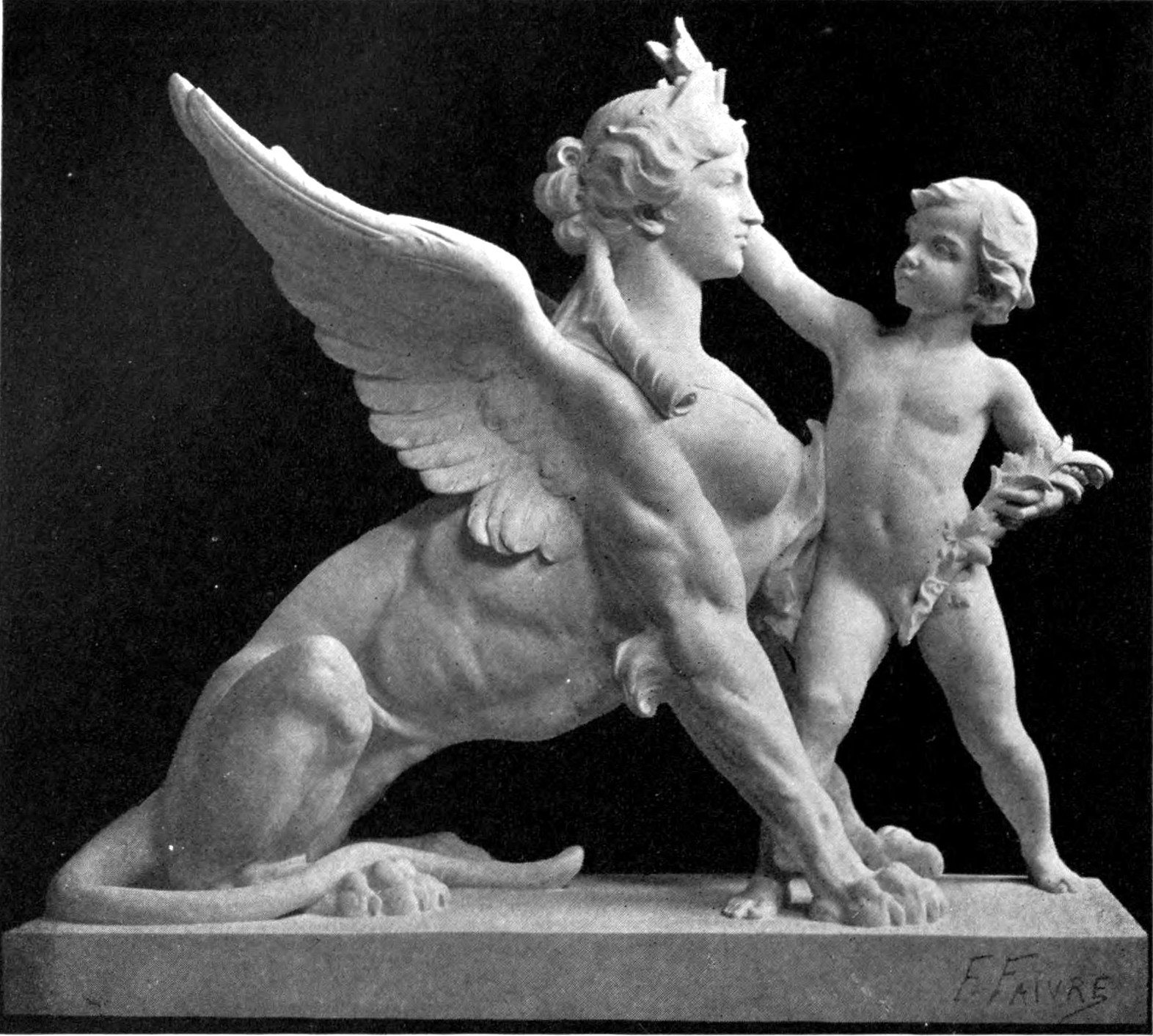
"The Riddle" (L'Enigme), a marble statuette exhibited in 1905

Marie Antoine Ferdinand Faivre was born in Marseille on 8 October 1860 and died on 19 August 1937. He studied sculpture at the Ecole des Beaux Arts in Paris under P.J.Cavelier, Louis-Ernest Barrias and André Allar, and frequently exhibited his work at the Salon des Artistes Français between 1882 and 1924, winning several awards. His work spanned designs for busts, statuettes and bas relief panels, for which he obtained many public commissions. These included decorative groups for the Zurich Bank, for the Cairo Museum, the facade of the Royal Automobile Club in London and many buildings in Paris; among the latter was a figure of Abundance for the Ritz and the 1906 bas reliefs of the seasons for Madame Hériot's town-house. His native Marseilles has little of his work except for a Baroque Virgin and Child at the corner of the Rue Fontange and the Rue Blanqui.

Among the influences on him at the start of the 20th century was Art Nouveau, as can be seen in the sinuous lines of his 1900 gilt-bronze jardinière, modelled with nudes and mermaids emerging from waves, or of the marble statue of Jean de la Fontaine's "The cat changed into a woman" of 1906 that he later cast in bronze. There is also the motif of the Sphinx which was a popular subject for the Symboliste generation. In the field of the applied arts, many of his designs were executed for the Sèvres and Émile Muller potteries, and for the fine art bronze founders Victor Thiébaut, Ferdinand Barbedienne and Siot-Decauville. He was later involved in the restoration of the Château de Versailles.
