= Aesop's Fables =

Collection of fables credited to Aesop

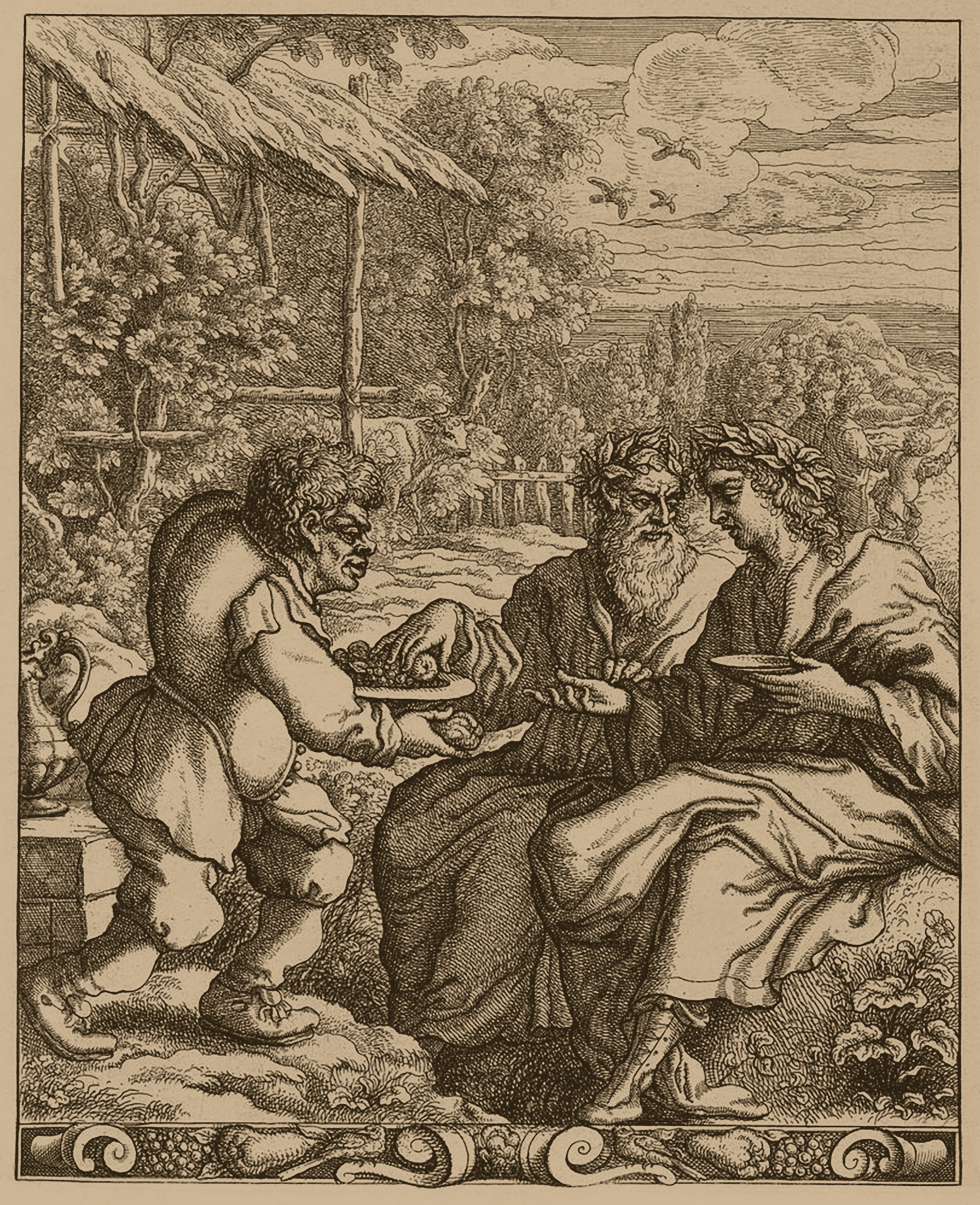
Aesop (left) as depicted by Francis Barlow in the 1687 edition of Aesop's Fables with His Life

Aesop's Fables, or the Aesopica, is a collection of fables credited to Aesop, a slave and storyteller who lived in ancient Greece between 620 and 564 BCE. Of varied and unclear origins, the stories associated with his name have descended to modern times through several sources and continue to be reinterpreted in different verbal registers and in popular as well as artistic media.

The fables were part of oral tradition and were not collected until about three centuries after Aesop's death. By that time, a variety of other stories, jokes and proverbs were being ascribed to him, although some of that material was from sources earlier than him or came from beyond the Greek cultural sphere. The process of inclusion has continued until the present, with some of the fables unrecorded before the Late Middle Ages and others arriving from outside Europe. The process is continuous, and new stories are still being added to the Aesop corpus, even when they are demonstrably more recent work and sometimes from known authors.

Manuscripts in Latin and Greek were important avenues of transmission, although poetical treatments in European vernaculars eventually formed another. On the arrival of printing, collections of Aesop's fables were among the earliest books in a variety of languages. Through the means of later collections, and translations or adaptations of them, Aesop's reputation as a fabulist was transmitted throughout the world.

Initially, the fables were addressed to adults and covered religious, social and political themes. They were also put to use as ethical guides and from the Renaissance onwards were particularly used for the education of children. Their ethical dimension was reinforced in the adult world through depiction in sculpture, painting and other illustrative means, as well as adaptation to drama and song. In addition, there have been reinterpretations of the meaning of fables and changes in emphasis over time.

== Fictions that point to the truth ==
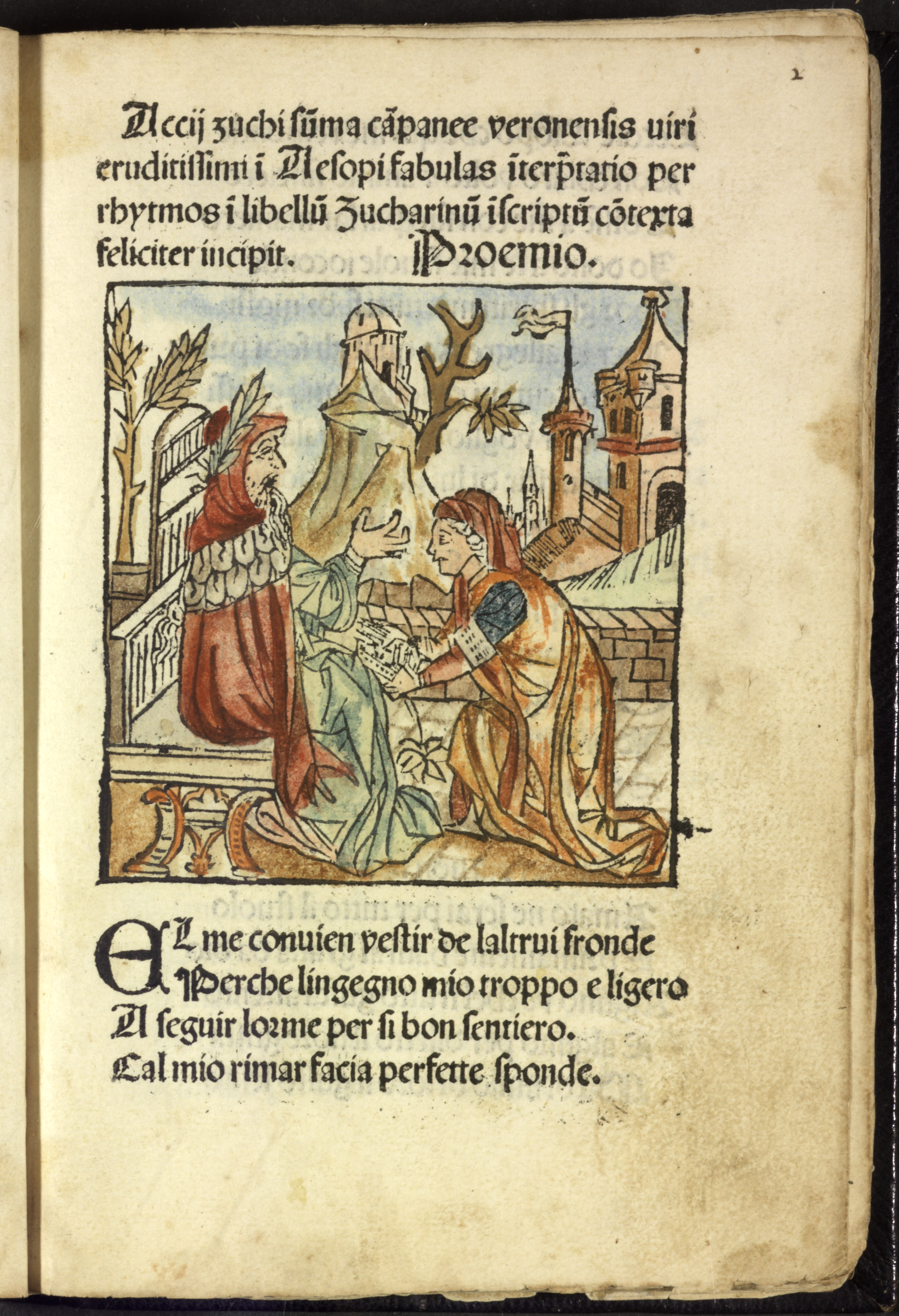
The beginning of 1485 Italian edition of Aesopus Moralisatus

=== Fable as a genre ===
Apollonius of Tyana, a 1st-century CE philosopher, is recorded as having said about Aesop:

like those who dine well off the plainest dishes, he made use of humble incidents to teach great truths, and after serving up a story, he adds to it the advice to do a thing or not to do it. Then, too, he was really more attached to truth than the poets are; for the latter do violence to their own stories to make them probable; but he, by announcing a story which everyone knows not to be true, told the truth by the very fact that he did not claim to be relating real events.

Earlier still, the Greek historian Herodotus mentioned in passing that "Aesop the fable writer" (Αἰσώπου τοῦ λογοποιοῦ; Aisṓpou toû logopoioû) was a slave who lived in Ancient Greece during the 5th century BCE. Among references in other writers, Aristophanes, in his comedy The Wasps, represented the protagonist Philocleon as having learnt the "absurdities" of Aesop from conversation at banquets; Plato wrote in Phaedo that Socrates whiled away his time in prison turning some of Aesop's fables "which he knew" into verses. Nonetheless, for two main reasons – because numerous morals within Aesop's attributed fables contradict each other, and because ancient accounts of Aesop's life contradict each other – the modern view is that Aesop was not the originator of all those fables attributed to him. Instead, any fable tended to be ascribed to the name of Aesop if there was no known alternative literary source.

In Classical times there were various theorists who tried to differentiate these fables from other kinds of narration. They had to be short and unaffected; in addition, they are fictitious, useful to life and true to nature. In them could be found talking animals and plants, although humans interacting only with humans figure in a few. Typically they might begin with a contextual introduction, followed by the story, often with the moral underlined at the end. Setting the context was often necessary as a guide to the story's interpretation, as in the case of the political meaning of The Frogs Who Desired a King and The Frogs and the Sun.

Sometimes the titles given later to the fables have become proverbial, as in the case of The Goose that Laid the Golden Eggs or The Town Mouse and the Country Mouse. In fact some fables, such as The Young Man and the Swallow, appear to have been invented as illustrations of already existing proverbs. One theorist, indeed, went so far as to define fables as extended proverbs. In this they have an aetiological function, explaining the origins of certain things like, in another context, why the ant is a mean, thieving creature or how the tortoise got its shell. Other fables, also verging on this function, are outright jokes, as in the case of The Old Woman and the Doctor, aimed at greedy practitioners of medicine.

=== Origins ===
The contradictions between fables already mentioned and alternative versions of much the same fable, as in the case of The Woodcutter and the Trees, are best explained by the ascription to Aesop of all examples of the genre. Some are demonstrably of West Asian origin, others have analogues further to the East. Modern scholarship reveals fables and proverbs of Aesopic form existing in both ancient Sumer and Akkad, as early as the third millennium BCE. Aesop's fables and the Indian tradition, as represented by the Buddhist Jataka tales and the Hindu Panchatantra, share about a dozen tales in common, although often widely differing in detail. There is some debate over whether the Greeks learned these fables from Indian storytellers or the other way, or if the influences were mutual.

Loeb editor Ben E. Perry took the extreme position in his book Babrius and Phaedrus (1965) that:

in the entire Greek tradition there is not, so far as I can see, a single fable that can be said to come either directly or indirectly from an Indian source; but many fables or fable-motifs that first appear in Greek or Near Eastern literature are found later in the Panchatantra and other Indian story-books, including the Buddhist Jatakas.

Although Aesop and the Buddha were near contemporaries, the stories of neither were recorded in writing until some centuries after their death. Few disinterested scholars would now be prepared to make so absolute a stand as Perry about their origin in view of the conflicting and still emerging evidence.

== Translation and transmission ==
=== Greek versions ===
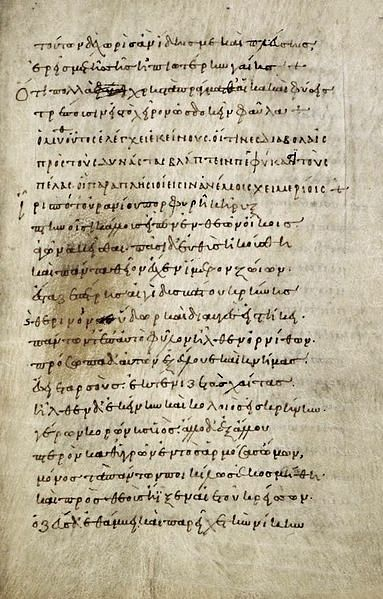
A Greek manuscript of the fables of Babrius

When and how the fables arrived in and travelled from ancient Greece remains uncertain. Some cannot be dated any earlier than Babrius and Phaedrus, several centuries after Aesop, and yet others even later. The earliest mentioned collection was by Demetrius of Phalerum, an Athenian orator and statesman of the 4th century BCE, who compiled the fables into a set of ten books for the use of orators. A follower of Aristotle, he simply catalogued all the fables that earlier Greek writers had used in isolation as exempla, putting them into prose. At least it was evidence of what was attributed to Aesop by others; but this may have included any ascription to him from the oral tradition in the way of animal fables, fictitious anecdotes, etiological or satirical myths, possibly even any proverb or joke, that these writers transmitted. It is more a proof of the power of Aesop's name to attract such stories to it than evidence of his actual authorship. In any case, although the work of Demetrius was mentioned frequently for the next twelve centuries, and was considered the official Aesop, no copy now survives. Present-day collections evolved from the later Greek version of Babrius, of which there now exists an incomplete manuscript of some 160 fables in choliambic verse. Current opinion is that he lived in the 1st century CE. The version of 55 fables in choliambic tetrameters by the 9th-century Ignatius the Deacon is also worth mentioning for its early attribution of tales from Oriental sources to Aesop.

Further light is thrown on the entry of Oriental stories into the Aesopic canon by their appearance in Jewish sources such as the Talmud and in Midrashic literature. There is a comparative list of these on the Jewish Encyclopedia website of which twelve resemble those that are common to both Greek and Indian sources, six are parallel to those only in Indian sources, and six others in Greek only. Where similar fables exist in Greece, India, and in the Talmud, the Talmudic form approaches more nearly the Indian. Thus, the fable "The Wolf and the Crane" is told in India of a lion and another bird. When Joshua ben Hananiah told that fable to the Jews, to prevent their rebelling against Rome and once more putting their heads into the lion's jaws (Gen. R. lxiv.), he shows familiarity with some form derived from India.

=== Latin versions ===
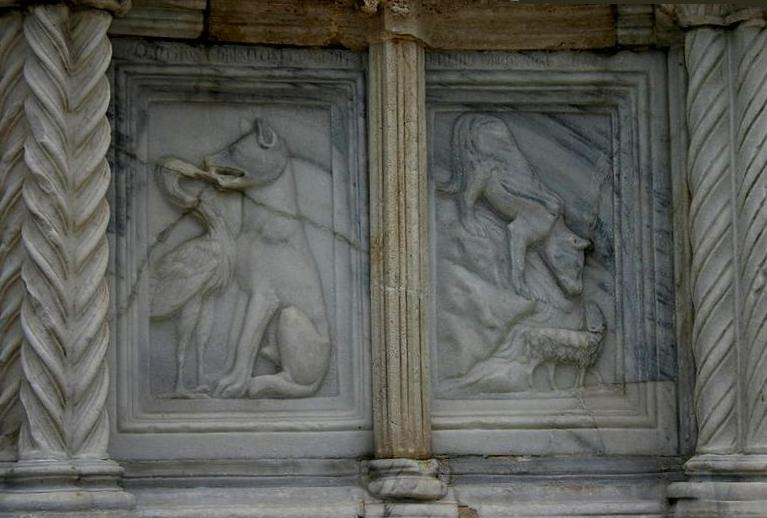
A detail of the 13th-century Fontana Maggiore in Perugia, Italy, with the fables of The Wolf and the Crane and The Wolf and the Lamb

The first extensive translation of Aesop into Latin iambic trimeters was performed by Phaedrus, a freedman of Augustus in the 1st century CE, although at least one fable had already been translated by the poet Ennius two centuries before, and others are referred to in the work of Horace. The rhetorician Aphthonius of Antioch wrote a technical treatise on, and converted into Latin prose, some forty of these fables in 315. It is notable as illustrating contemporary and later usage of fables in rhetorical practice. Teachers of philosophy and rhetoric often set the fables of Aesop as an exercise for their scholars, inviting them not only to discuss the moral of the tale, but also to practise style and the rules of grammar by making new versions of their own. A little later the poet Ausonius handed down some of these fables in verse, which the writer Julianus Titianus translated into prose, and in the early 5th century Avianus put 42 of these fables into Latin elegiacs.

The largest, oldest known and most influential of the prose versions of Phaedrus bears the name of an otherwise unknown fabulist named Romulus. It contains 83 fables, dates from the 10th century and seems to have been based on an earlier prose version which, under the name of "Aesop" and addressed to one Rufus, may have been written in the Carolingian period or even earlier. The collection became the source from which, during the second half of the Middle Ages, almost all the collections of Latin fables in prose and verse were wholly or partially drawn. A version of the first three books of Romulus in elegiac verse, possibly made around the 12th century, was one of the most highly influential texts in medieval Europe. Referred to variously (among other titles) as the verse Romulus or elegiac Romulus, and ascribed to Gualterus Anglicus, it was a common Latin teaching text and was popular well into the Renaissance. Another version of Romulus in Latin elegiacs was made by Alexander Neckam, born at St Albans in 1157.

Interpretive "translations" of the elegiac Romulus were very common in Europe in the Middle Ages. Among the earliest was one in the 11th century by Ademar of Chabannes, which includes some new material. This was followed by a prose collection of parables by the Cistercian preacher Odo of Cheriton around 1200 where the fables (many of which are not Aesopic) are given a strong medieval and clerical tinge. This interpretive tendency, and the inclusion of yet more non-Aesopic material, was to grow as versions in the various European vernaculars began to appear in the following centuries.

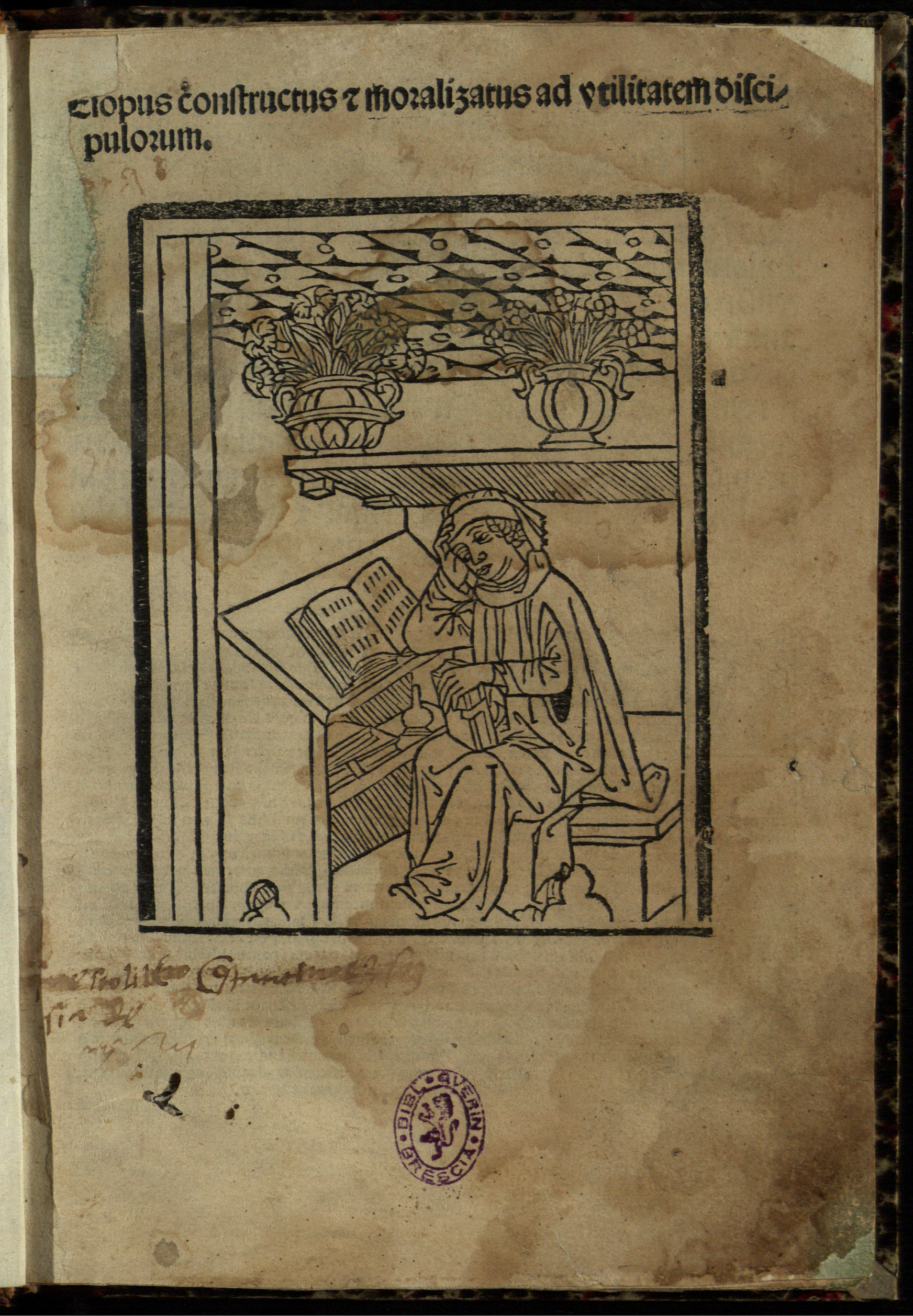
Aesopus constructus etc., 1495 edition with metrical version of Fabulae Lib. I–IV by Anonymus Neveleti

With the revival of literary Latin during the Renaissance, authors began compiling collections of fables in which those traditionally by Aesop and those from other sources appeared side by side. One of the earliest was by Lorenzo Bevilaqua, also known as Laurentius Abstemius, who wrote 197 fables, the first hundred of which were published as Hecatomythium in 1495. Little by Aesop was included. At the most, some traditional fables are adapted and reinterpreted: The Lion and the Mouse is continued and given a new ending (fable 52); The Oak and the Reed becomes "The Elm and the Willow" (53); The Ant and the Grasshopper is adapted as "The Gnat and the Bee" (94) with the difference that the gnat offers to teach music to the bee's children. There are also Mediaeval tales such as The Mice in Council (195) and stories created to support popular proverbs such as 'Still Waters Run Deep' (5) and 'A woman, an ass and a walnut tree' (65), where the latter refers back to Aesop's fable of The Walnut Tree. Most of the fables in Hecatomythium were later translated in the second half of Roger L'Estrange's Fables of Aesop and other eminent mythologists (1692); some also appeared among the 102 in H. Clarke's Latin reader, Select fables of Aesop: with an English translation (1787), of which there were both English and American editions.

There were later three notable collections of fables in verse, among which the most influential was Gabriele Faerno's Centum Fabulae (1564). The majority of the hundred fables there are Aesop's but there are also humorous tales such as The drowned woman and her husband (41) and The miller, his son and the donkey (100). In the same year that Faerno was published in Italy, Hieronymus Osius brought out a collection of 294 fables titled Fabulae Aesopi carmine elegiaco redditae in Germany. This too contained some from elsewhere, such as The Dog in the Manger (67). Then in 1604 the Austrian Pantaleon Weiss, known as Pantaleon Candidus, published Centum et Quinquaginta Fabulae. The 152 poems there were grouped by subject, with sometimes more than one devoted to the same fable, although presenting alternative versions of it, as in the case of The Hawk and the Nightingale (133–5). It also includes the earliest instance of The Lion, the Bear and the Fox (60) in a language other than Greek.

Another voluminous collection of fables in Latin verse was Anthony Alsop's Fabularum Aesopicarum Delectus (Oxford 1698). The bulk of the 237 fables there are prefaced by the text in Greek, while there are also a handful in Hebrew and in Arabic; the final fables, only attested from Latin sources, are without other versions. For the most part the poems are confined to a lean telling of the fable without drawing a moral.

== Aesop in other languages ==
=== Europe ===
For many centuries the main transmission of Aesop's fables across Europe remained in Latin or else orally in various vernaculars, where they mixed with folk tales derived from other sources. This mixing is often apparent in early vernacular collections of fables in mediaeval times.

- Ysopet, an adaptation of some of the fables into Old French octosyllabic couplets, was written by Marie de France in the 12th century. The morals with which she closes each fable reflect the feudal situation of her time.
- In the 13th century the Jewish author Berechiah ha-Nakdan wrote Mishlei Shualim, a collection of 103 'Fox Fables' in Hebrew rhymed prose. This included many animal tales passing under the name of Aesop, as well as several more derived from Marie de France and others. Berechiah's work adds a layer of Biblical quotations and allusions to the tales, adapting them as a way to teach Jewish ethics. The first printed edition appeared in Mantua in 1557.
- Äsop, an adaptation into Middle Low German verse of 125 Romulus fables, was written by Gerhard von Minden around 1370.
- Chwedlau Odo ("Odo's Tales") is a 14th-century Welsh version of the animal fables in Odo of Cheriton's Parabolae, not all of which are of Aesopic origin. Many show sympathy for the poor and oppressed, with often sharp criticisms of high-ranking church officials.
- Eustache Deschamps included several of Aesop's fables among his moral ballades, written in Mediaeval French towards the end of the 14th century, in one of which there is mention of what 'Aesop tells in his book' (Ysoppe dit en son livre et raconte). In most, the telling of the fable precedes the drawing of a moral in terms of contemporary behaviour, but two comment on this with only contextual reference to fables not recounted in the text.
- Isopes Fabules was written in Middle English rhyme royal stanzas by the monk John Lydgate towards the start of the 15th century. Seven tales are included and heavy emphasis is laid on the moral lessons to be learned from them.
- The Morall Fabillis of Esope the Phrygian was written in Middle Scots iambic pentameters by Robert Henryson about 1480. In the accepted text it consists of thirteen versions of fables, seven modelled on stories from "Aesop" expanded from the Latin Romulus manuscripts.

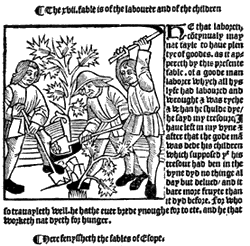
The fable of the farmer and his sons from Caxton's edition, 1484

The main impetus behind the translation of large collections of fables attributed to Aesop and translated into European languages came from an early printed publication in Germany. There had been many small selections in various languages during the Middle Ages but the first attempt at an exhaustive edition was made by Heinrich Steinhöwel in his Esopus, published c. 1476. This contained both Latin versions and German translations and also included a translation of Rinuccio da Castiglione (or d'Arezzo)'s version from the Greek of a life of Aesop (1448). Some 156 fables appear, collected from Romulus, Avianus and other sources, accompanied by a commentarial preface and moralising conclusion, and 205 woodcuts. Translations or versions based on Steinhöwel's book followed shortly in Italian (1479), French (1480), English (the Caxton edition of 1484) and Czech in about 1488. These were many times reprinted before the start of the 16th century. The Spanish version of 1489, La vida del Ysopet con sus fabulas hystoriadas was equally successful and often reprinted in both the Old and New World through three centuries.

Some fables were later treated creatively in collections of their own by authors in such a way that they became associated with their names rather than Aesop's. The most celebrated were La Fontaine's Fables, published in French during the later 17th century. Inspired by the brevity and simplicity of Aesop's, those in the first six books were heavily dependent on traditional Aesopic material; fables in the next six were more diffuse and diverse in origin. At the start of the 19th century, some of the fables were adapted into Russian, and often reinterpreted, by the fabulist Ivan Krylov. In most cases, but not all, these were dependent on La Fontaine's versions.

=== Asia and America ===
Translations into Asian languages at a very early date derive originally from Greek sources. These include the so-called Fables of Syntipas, a compilation of Aesopic fables in Syriac, dating from the 9/11th centuries. Included there were several other tales of possibly West Asian origin. In Central Asia there was a 10th-century collection of the fables in Uighur.

After the Middle Ages, fables largely deriving from Latin sources were passed on by Europeans as part of their colonial or missionary enterprises. 47 fables were translated into the Nahuatl language in the late 16th century under the title In zazanilli in Esopo. The work of a native translator, it adapted the stories to fit the Mexican environment, incorporating Aztec concepts and rituals and making them rhetorically more subtle than their Latin source.

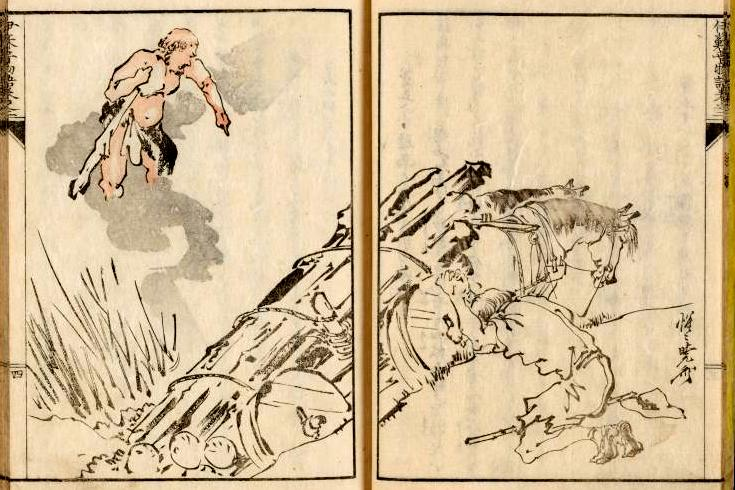
A Japanese woodblock print illustrates the moral of Hercules and the Wagoner.

Portuguese missionaries who arrived in Japan at the end of the 16th century introduced the fables to Japan by translating the Latin into Japanese and printing it in latin letters. The title was Esopo no Fabulas and dates to 1593. It was soon followed by a fuller translation into a three-volume kanazōshi entitled Isopo Monogatari (伊曾保 物語). This was the sole Western work to survive after the expulsion of Westerners from Japan, since by that time the figure of Aesop had been acculturated and presented as if he were Japanese. Coloured woodblock editions of individual fables were made by Kawanabe Kyosai in the 19th century.

The first translations of Aesop's Fables into the Chinese languages were made at the start of the 17th century, the first substantial collection being of 38 conveyed orally by the Jesuit missionary Nicolas Trigault and written down by a Chinese academic named Zhang Geng (Chinese: 張賡; pinyin: Zhāng Gēng) in 1625. This was followed two centuries later by Yishi Yuyan 《意拾喻言》 (Esop's Fables: written in Chinese by the Learned Mun Mooy Seen-Shang, and compiled in their present form with a free and a literal translation) in 1840 by Robert Thom and apparently based on the version by Roger L'Estrange. This work was initially very popular until someone realised the fables were anti-authoritarian and the book was banned for a while. A little later, however, in the foreign concession in Shanghai, A. B. Cabaniss brought out a transliterated translation in Shanghai dialect, Yisuopu yu yan (伊娑菩喻言, 1856). There have also been 20th century translations by Zhou Zuoren and others.

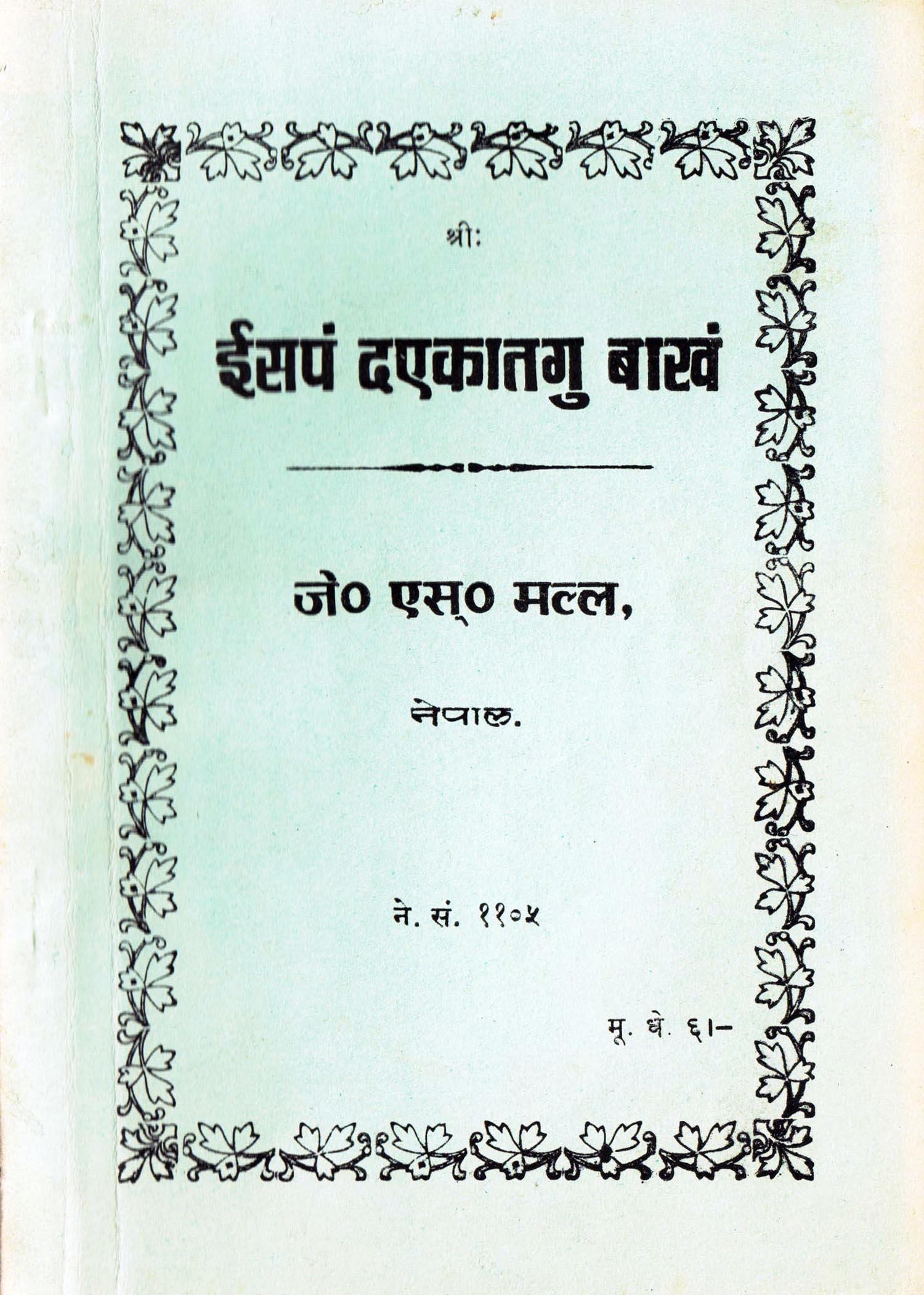
The Nepalese Iisapan Daekaatagu Bakhan

Translations into the languages of South Asia began at the very start of the 19th century. The Oriental Fabulist (1803) contained roman script versions in Bengali, Hindi and Urdu. Adaptations followed in Marathi (1806) and Bengali (1816), and then complete collections in Hindi (1837), Kannada (1840), Urdu (1850), Tamil (1853) and Sindhi (1854).

In Burma, which had its own ethical folk tradition based on the Buddhist Jataka Tales, the joint Pali and Burmese language translation of Aesop's fables was published in 1880 from Rangoon by the American Missionary Press. Outside the British Raj, Jagat Sundar Malla's translation into the Newar language of Nepal was published in 1915. Further to the west, the Afghani academic Hafiz Sahar's translation of some 250 of Aesop's Fables into Persian was first published in 1972 under the name Luqman Hakim.

=== Africa ===
The South African writer Sibusiso Nyembezi translated some of Aesop's fables into Zulu in a series of books he prepared for school students in the 1960s. However, with the aim of preserving Zulu cultural heritage, he substituted animals better known in their areas in some of these fables.

== Versions in regional languages ==
=== Minority expression ===
The 18th to 19th centuries saw a vast quantity of fables in verse being written in all European languages. Regional languages and dialects in the Romance area made use of versions adapted particularly from La Fontaine's recreations of ancient material. One of the earliest publications in France was the anonymous Fables Causides en Bers Gascouns (Selected fables in Gascon verse, Bayonne, 1776), which contained 106. Also in the vanguard was Jean-Baptiste Foucaud's Quelques fables choisies de La Fontaine en patois limousin (109) in the Occitan Limousin dialect, originally with 39 fables, and Fables et contes en vers patois by August Tandon, also published in the first decade of the 19th century in the neighbouring dialect of Montpellier. The last of these were very free recreations, with the occasional appeal directly to the original Maistre Ézôpa. A later commentator noted that while the author could sometimes embroider his theme, at others he concentrated the sense to an Aesopean brevity.

Many translations were made into languages contiguous to or within the French borders. Ipui onak (1805) was the first translation of 50 fables of Aesop by the writer Bizenta Mogel Elgezabal into the Basque language spoken on the Spanish side of the Pyrenees. It was followed in mid-century by two translations on the French side: 50 fables in J-B. Archu's Choix de Fables de La Fontaine, traduites en vers basques (1848) and 150 in Fableac edo aleguiac Lafontenetaric berechiz hartuac (Bayonne, 1852) by Abbé Martin Goyhetche (1791–1859). Versions in Breton were written by Pierre Désiré de Goësbriand (1784–1853) in 1836 and Yves Louis Marie Combeau (1799–1870) between 1836 and 1838. The turn of Provençal came in 1859 with Li Boutoun de guèto, poésies patoises by Antoine Bigot (1825–1897), followed by several other collections of fables in the Nîmes dialect between 1881 and 1891. Alsatian dialect versions of La Fontaine appeared in 1879 after the region was ceded away following the Franco-Prussian War. At the end of the following century, Brother Denis-Joseph Sibler (1920–2002) published a collection of adaptations (first recorded in 1983) that has gone through several impressions since 1995. The use of Corsican came later. Natale Rochicchioli (1911–2002) was particularly well known for his very free adaptations of La Fontaine, of which he made recordings as well as publishing his Favule di Natale in the 1970s.

During the 19th century renaissance of Belgian dialect literature in Walloon, several authors adapted versions of the fables to the racy speech (and subject matter) of Liège. They included Charles Duvivier (in 1842); Joseph Lamaye (1845); and the team of Jean-Joseph Dehin and François Bailleux, who between them covered all of La Fontaine's books I–VI, (Fåves da Lafontaine mettowes è ligeois, 1850–56). Adaptations into other regional dialects were made by Charles Letellier (Mons, 1842) and Charles Wérotte (Namur, 1844); much later, Léon Bernus published some hundred imitations of La Fontaine in the dialect of Charleroi (1872); he was followed during the 1880s by Joseph Dufrane, writing in the Borinage dialect under the pen-name Bosquètia. In the 20th century there has been a selection of fifty fables in the Condroz dialect by Joseph Houziaux (1946), to mention only the most prolific in an ongoing surge of adaptation.

The motive behind the later activity across these areas was to assert regional specificity against a growing centralism and the encroachment of the language of the capital on what had until then been predominantly monoglot areas. Surveying its literary manifestations, commentators have noted that the point of departure of the individual tales is not as important as what they become in the process. Even in the hands of less skilled dialect adaptations, La Fontaine's polished versions of the fables are returned to the folkloristic roots by which they often came to him in the first places. But many of the gifted regional authors were well aware of what they were doing in their work. In fitting the narration of the story to their local idiom, in appealing to the folk proverbs derived from such tales, and in adapting the story to local conditions and circumstances, the fables were so transposed as to go beyond bare equivalence, becoming independent works in their own right. Thus Emile Ruben claimed of the linguistic transmutations in Jean Foucaud's collection of fables that, "not content with translating, he has created a new work". In a similar way, the critic Maurice Piron described the Walloon versions of François Bailleux as "masterpieces of original imitation", and this is echoed in the claim that in Natale Rocchiccioli's free Corsican versions too there is "more creation than adaptation".

In the 20th century there were also translations into regional dialects of English. These include the few examples in Addison Hibbard's Aesop in Negro Dialect (American Speech, 1926) and the 26 in Robert Stephen's Fables of Aesop in Scots Verse (Peterhead, Scotland, 1987), translated into the Aberdeenshire dialect. Glasgow University has also been responsible for R.W. Smith's modernised dialect translation of Robert Henryson's The Morall Fabillis of Esope the Phrygian (1999, see above). The University of Illinois likewise included dialect translations by Norman Shapiro in its Creole echoes: the francophone poetry of nineteenth-century Louisiana (2004, see below).

=== Creole ===
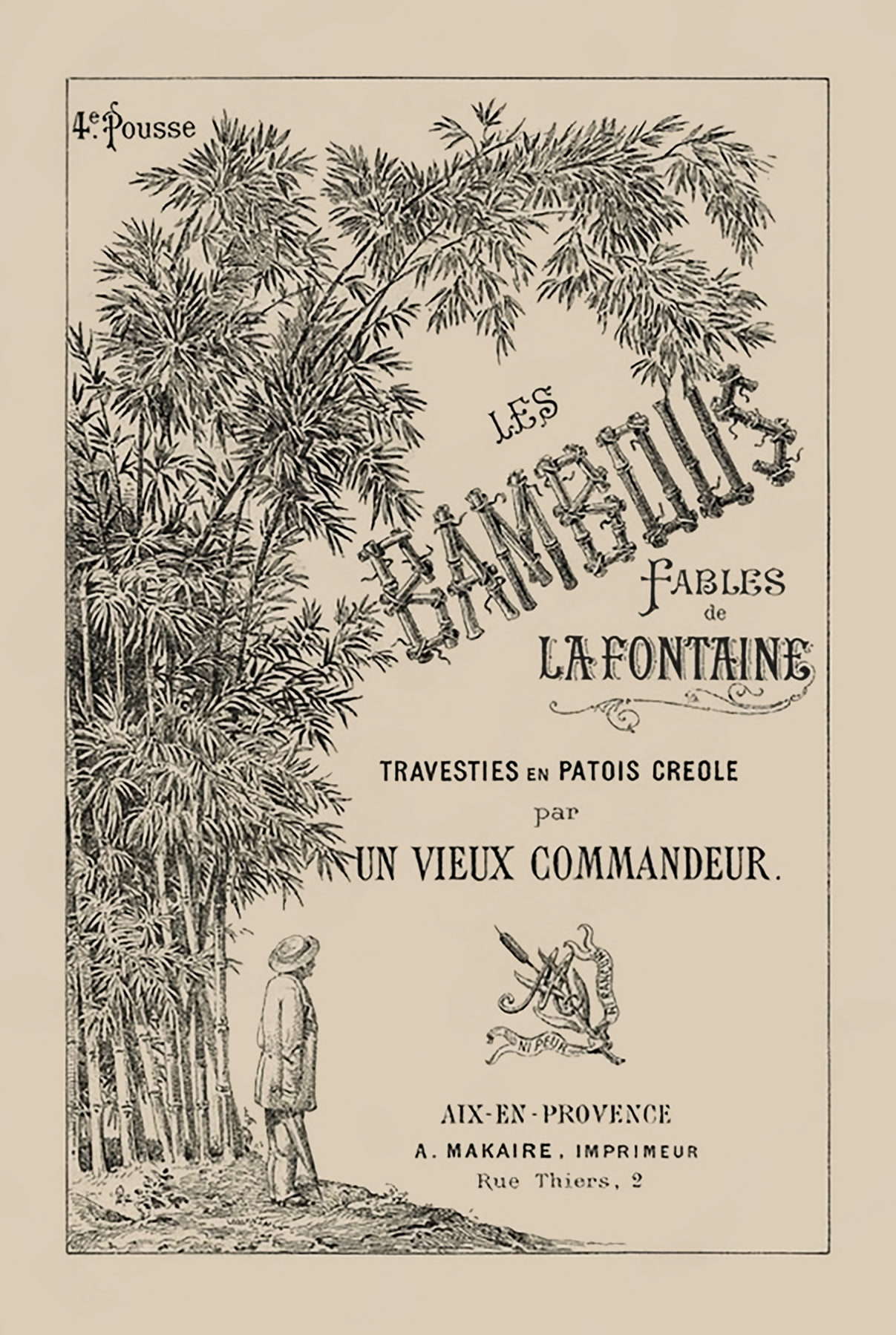
Cover of the 1885 French edition of Les Bambous by François-Achille Marbot

French-based creole languages saw a flowering of such adaptations from the middle of the 19th century onward – initially as part of the colonialist project but later as an assertion of love for and pride in the dialect. A version of La Fontaine's fables in the dialect of Martinique was made by François-Achille Marbot (1817–1866) in Les Bambous, Fables de la Fontaine travesties en patois créole (Port Royal, 1846) which had lasting success. As well as two later editions in Martinique, there were two more published in France in 1870 and 1885 and others in the 20th century. Later dialect fables by Paul Baudot (1801–1870) from neighbouring Guadeloupe owed nothing to La Fontaine, but in 1869 some translated examples did appear in a grammar of Trinidadian French creole written by John Jacob Thomas. Then the start of the new century saw the publication of Georges Sylvain's Cric? Crac! Fables de la Fontaine racontées par un montagnard haïtien et transcrites en vers créoles (La Fontaine's fables told by a Haiti highlander and written in creole verse, 1901).

On the South American mainland, Alfred de Saint-Quentin published a selection of fables freely adapted from La Fontaine into Guyanese creole in 1872. This was among a collection of poems and stories (with facing translations) in a book that also included a short history of the territory and an essay on creole grammar. On the other side of the Caribbean, Jules Choppin (1830–1914) was adapting La Fontaine to the Louisiana slave creole at the end of the 19th century in versions that are still appreciated. The New Orleans author Edgar Grima (1847–1939) also adapted La Fontaine into both standard French and into dialect.

Versions in the French creole of the islands in the Indian Ocean began somewhat earlier than in the Caribbean. Louis Héry (1801–1856) emigrated from Brittany to Réunion in 1820. Having become a schoolmaster, he adapted some of La Fontaine's fables into the local dialect in Fables créoles dédiées aux dames de l'île Bourbon (Creole fables for island women). This was published in 1829 and went through three editions. In addition 49 fables of La Fontaine were adapted to the Seychelles dialect around 1900 by Rodolphine Young (1860–1932) but these remained unpublished until 1983. Jean-Louis Robert's recent translation of Babrius into Réunion creole (2007) adds a further motive for such adaptation. Fables began as an expression of the slave culture and their background is in the simplicity of agrarian life. Creole transmits this experience with greater purity than the urbane language of the slave-owner. More recently still there has been Ezop Pou Zanfan Lekol (2017), free adaptations of 125 fables into Mauritian Creole by Dev Virahsawmy, accompanied by English texts drawn from The Aesop for Children (1919).

=== Slang ===
Fables belong essentially to the oral tradition; they survive by being remembered and then retold in one's own words. When they are written down, particularly in the dominant language of instruction, they lose something of their essence. A strategy for reclaiming them is therefore to exploit the gap between the written and the spoken language. One of those who did this in English was Sir Roger L'Estrange, who translated the fables into the racy urban slang of his day and further underlined their purpose by including in his collection many of the subversive Latin fables of Laurentius Abstemius. In France the fable tradition had already been renewed in the 17th century by La Fontaine's influential reinterpretations of Aesop and others. In the centuries that followed there were further reinterpretations through the medium of regional languages, which to those at the centre were regarded as little better than slang. Eventually, however, the demotic tongue of the cities themselves began to be appreciated as a literary medium.

One of the earliest examples of these urban slang translations was the series of individual fables contained in a single folded sheet, appearing under the title of Les Fables de Gibbs in 1929. Others written during the period were eventually anthologised as Fables de La Fontaine en argot (Étoile sur Rhône, 1989). This followed the genre's growth in popularity after World War II. Two short selections of fables by Bernard Gelval about 1945 were succeeded by two selections of 15 fables each by 'Marcus' (Paris, 1947. Reprinted in 1958 and 2006), Api Condret's Recueil des fables en argot (Paris, 1951) and Géo Sandry (1897–1975) and Jean Kolb's Fables en argot (Paris, 1950/60). The majority of such printings were privately produced leaflets and pamphlets, often sold by entertainers at their performances, and are difficult to date. Some of these poems then entered the repertoire of noted performers such as Boby Forest and Yves Deniaud, of which recordings were made. In the south of France, Georges Goudon published numerous folded sheets of fables in the post-war period. Described as monologues, they use Lyon slang and the Mediterranean Lingua Franca known as Sabir. Slang versions by others continue to be produced in various parts of France, both in printed and recorded form.

== Children ==
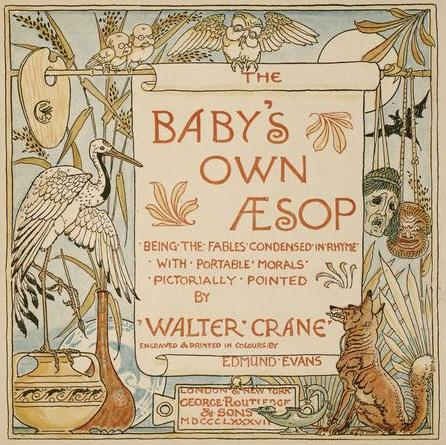
Title page of Baby’s Own Aesop by Walter Crane, 1887

The first printed version of Aesop's Fables in English was published on 26 March 1484, by William Caxton. Many others, in prose and verse, followed over the centuries. In the 20th century Ben E. Perry edited the Aesopic fables of Babrius and Phaedrus for the Loeb Classical Library and compiled a numbered index by type in 1952. Olivia and Robert Temple's Penguin edition is titled The Complete Fables by Aesop (1998) but in fact many from Babrius, Phaedrus and other major ancient sources have been omitted. More recently, in 2002 a translation by Laura Gibbs titled Aesop's Fables was published by Oxford World's Classics. This book includes 359 and has selections from all the major Greek and Latin sources.

Until the 18th century the fables were largely put to adult use by teachers, preachers, speech-makers and moralists. It was the philosopher John Locke who first seems to have advocated targeting children as a special audience in Some Thoughts Concerning Education (1693). Aesop's fables in his opinion are:

apt to delight and entertain a child ... yet afford useful reflection to a grown man. And if his memory retain them all his life after, he will not repent to find them there, amongst his manly thoughts and serious business. If his Aesop has pictures in it, it will entertain him much better, and encourage him to read when it carries the increase of knowledge with it. For such visible objects children hear talked of in vain, and without any satisfaction, whilst they have no ideas of them; those ideas being not to be had from sounds, but from the things themselves, or their pictures.

That young people are a special target for the fables was not a particularly new idea and a number of ingenious schemes for catering to that audience had already been put into practice in Europe. The Centum Fabulae of Gabriele Faerno was commissioned by Pope Pius IV in the 16th century 'so that children might learn, at the same time and from the same book, both moral and linguistic purity'. When King Louis XIV of France wanted to instruct his six-year-old son, he incorporated the series of hydraulic statues representing 38 chosen fables in the labyrinth of Versailles in the 1670s. In this he had been advised by Charles Perrault, who was later to translate Faerno's widely published Latin poems into French verse and so bring them to a wider audience. Then in the 1730s appeared the eight volumes of Nouvelles Poésies Spirituelles et Morales sur les plus beaux airs, the first six of which incorporated a section of fables specifically aimed at children. In this the fables of La Fontaine were rewritten to fit popular airs of the day and arranged for simple performance. The preface to this work comments that 'we consider ourselves happy if, in giving them an attraction to useful lessons which are suited to their age, we have given them an aversion to the profane songs which are often put into their mouths and which only serve to corrupt their innocence.' The work was popular and reprinted into the following century.

In Great Britain various authors began to develop this new market in the 18th century, giving a brief outline of the story and what was usually a longer commentary on its moral and practical meaning. The first of such works is Reverend Samuel Croxall's Fables of Aesop and Others, newly done into English with an Application to each Fable. First published in 1722, with engravings for each fable by Elisha Kirkall, it was continually reprinted into the second half of the 19th century. Another popular collection was John Newbery's Fables in Verse for the Improvement of the Young and the Old, facetiously attributed to Abraham Aesop Esquire, which was to see ten editions after its first publication in 1757. Robert Dodsley's three-volume Select Fables of Esop and other Fabulists is distinguished for several reasons. First that it was printed in Birmingham by John Baskerville in 1761; second that it appealed to children by having the animals speak in character, the Lion in regal style, the Owl with 'pomp of phrase'; thirdly because it gathers into three sections fables from ancient sources, those that are more recent (including some borrowed from Jean de la Fontaine), and new stories of his own invention.

Thomas Bewick's editions from Newcastle upon Tyne are equally distinguished for the quality of his woodcuts. The first of those under his name was the Select Fables in Three Parts published in 1784. This was followed in 1818 by The Fables of Aesop and Others. The work is divided into three sections: the first has some of Dodsley's fables prefaced by a short prose moral; the second has 'Fables with Reflections', in which each story is followed by a prose and a verse moral and then a lengthy prose reflection; the third, 'Fables in Verse', includes fables from other sources in poems by several unnamed authors; in these the moral is incorporated into the body of the poem.

In the early 19th century authors turned to writing verse specifically for children and included fables in their output. One of the most popular was the writer of nonsense verse, Richard Scrafton Sharpe (died 1852), whose Old Friends in a New Dress: familiar fables in verse first appeared in 1807 and went through five steadily augmented editions until 1837. Jefferys Taylor's Aesop in Rhyme, with some originals, first published in 1820, was as popular and also went through several editions. The versions are lively but Taylor takes considerable liberties with the story line. Both authors were alive to the over serious nature of the 18th century collections and tried to remedy this. Sharpe in particular discussed the dilemma they presented and recommended a way round it, tilting at the same time at the format in Croxall's fable collection:

It has been the accustomed method in printing fables to divide the moral from the subject; and children, whose minds are alive to the entertainment of an amusing story, too often turn from one fable to another, rather than peruse the less interesting lines that come under the term "Application". It is with this conviction that the author of the present selection has endeavoured to interweave the moral with the subject, that the story shall not be obtained without the benefit arising from it; and that amusement and instruction may go hand in hand.

—

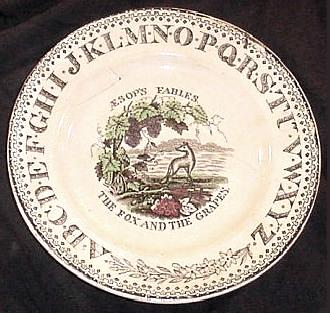
Brownhills alphabet plate, Aesop's Fables series, The Fox and the Grapes c. 1880

Sharpe's limerick versions of Aesop's fables appeared in 1887. This was in a hand-produced Arts and Crafts Movement edition, The Baby's Own Aesop: being the fables condensed in rhyme with portable morals pictorially pointed by Walter Crane.

Some later prose editions were particularly notable for their illustrations. Among these was Aesop's fables: a new version, chiefly from original sources (1848) by Thomas James, 'with more than one hundred illustrations designed by John Tenniel'. Tenniel himself did not think highly of his work there and took the opportunity to redraw some in the revised edition of 1884, which also used pictures by Ernest Griset and Harrison Weir. Once the technology was in place for coloured reproductions, illustrations became ever more attractive. Notable early 20th century editions include V.S. Vernon Jones' new translation of the fables accompanied by the pictures of Arthur Rackham (London, 1912) and in the US Aesop for Children (Chicago, 1919), illustrated by Milo Winter.

The illustrations from Croxall's editions were an early inspiration for other artefacts aimed at children. In the 18th century they appear on tableware from the Chelsea, Wedgwood and Fenton potteries, for example. 19th century examples with a definitely educational aim include the fable series used on the alphabet plates issued in great numbers from the Brownhills Pottery in Staffordshire. Fables were used equally early in the design of tiles to surround the nursery fireplace. The latter were even more popular in the 19th century when there were specially designed series from Mintons, Minton-Hollins and Maw & Co. In France too, well-known illustrations of La Fontaine's fables were often used on china.

== Religious themes ==
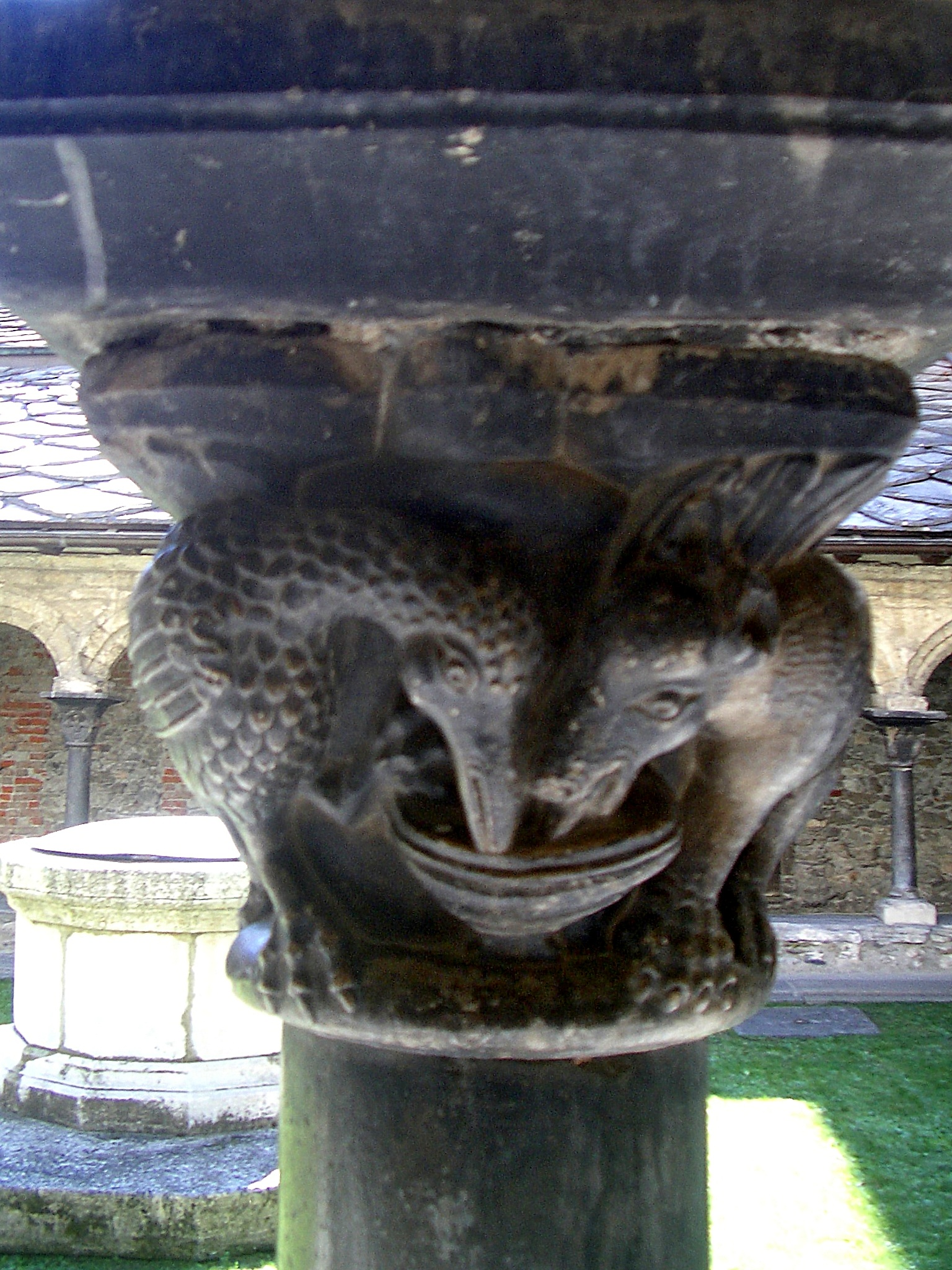
12th-century pillar, cloister of the Collegiate church of Saint Ursus, Aosta: the Fox and the Stork.

In Classical times there was an overlap between fable and myth, especially where they had an aetiological function. Among those are two which deal with the difference between humans and animals. According to the first, humans are distinguished by their rationality. But in those cases where they have a bestial mentality, the explanation is that at creation animals were found to outnumber humans and some were therefore modified in shape but retained their animal souls.

Such early philosophical speculation was also extended to the ethical problems connected with divine justice. For example, it was perceived as disproportionate for an evil man to be punished by dying in a shipwreck when it involved many other innocent people. The god Hermes explained this to an objector by the human analogy of a man bitten by an ant and in consequence stamping on all those about his feet. Again, it was asked why the consequences of an evil deed did not follow immediately it was committed. Hermes was involved here too, since he records men's acts on potsherds and takes them to Zeus piled in a box. The god of justice, however, goes through them in reverse order and the penalty may therefore be delayed. However, where the fault is perceived as an act of defiance, as happens in the fable of Horkos, retribution arrives swiftly.

Some fables may express open scepticism, as in the story of the man marketing a statue of Hermes who boasted of its effectiveness. Asked why he was disposing of such an asset, the huckster explains that the god takes his time in granting favours while he himself needs immediate cash. In another example, a farmer whose mattock has been stolen goes to a temple to see if the culprit can be found by divination. On his arrival he hears an announcement asking for information about a robbery at the temple and concludes that a god who cannot look after his own must be useless. But the contrary position, against reliance on religious ritual, was taken in fables like Hercules and the Wagoner that illustrate the proverb "god helps those who help themselves". The story was also to become a favourite centuries later in Protestant England, where one commentator took the extreme position that to neglect the necessity of self-help is "blasphemy" and that it is "a great sin for a man to fail in his trade or occupation by running often to prayers".

As the fables moved out of the Greek-speaking world and were adapted to different times and religions, it is notable how radically some fables were reinterpreted. Thus one of the fables collected under the title of the Lion's share and originally directed against tyranny became in the hands of Rumi a parable of oneness with the God of Islam and obedience to divine authority. In the Jewish 'fox fables' of Berechiah ha-Nakdan, the humorous account of the hares and the frogs was made the occasion to recommend trust in God, while Christian reinterpretation of animal symbolism in Mediaeval times turned The Wolf and the Crane into a parable of the rescue of the sinner's soul from Hell.

In Mediaeval times too, fables were collected for use in sermons, of which Odo of Cheriton's Parobolae is just one example. At the start of the Reformation, Martin Luther followed his example in the work now known as the Coburg Fables. Another source of Christianized fables was in the emblem books of the 16th–17th centuries. In Georgette de Montenay's Emblemes ou devises chrestiennes (1571), for example, the fable of The Oak and the Reed was depicted in the context of the lines from the Magnificat, "He hath put down the mighty from their seats and exalted them of low degree" (Luke 1.52, AV).

Once the fables were perceived as primarily for the instruction of children, a new generation of Christian writers began putting their own construction on them, often at odds with their original interpretation. An extreme example occurs in a compilation called Christian Fables from the Victorian era, where The North Wind and the Sun is referred to Biblical passages in which religion is compared to a cloak. Therefore, says the author, one should beware of abandoning one's beliefs under the sun of prosperity. Demonstrably, the essence of fables is their adaptability. Beginning two and a half millennia ago with aetiological solutions to philosophical problems, fresh religious applications were continuing into the present.

== Dramatised fables ==
The success of La Fontaine's fables in France started a European fashion for creating plays around them. The originator was Edmé Boursault, with his five-act verse drama Les Fables d'Esope (1690), later retitled Esope à la ville (Aesop in town). Such was its popularity that a rival theatre produced Eustache Le Noble's Arlaquin-Esope in the following year. Boursault then wrote a sequel, Esope à la cour (Aesop at court), a heroic comedy that was held up by the censors and not produced until after his death in 1701. Other 18th-century imitations included Jean-Antoine du Cerceau's Esope au collège (1715), where being put in charge of a school gives the fabulist ample opportunity to tell his stories, and Charles-Étienne Pesselier's Esope au Parnasse (1739), a one-act piece in verse.

Esope à la ville was written in French alexandrine couplets and depicted a physically ugly Aesop acting as adviser to Learchus, governor of Cyzicus under King Croesus, and using his fables as satirical comments on those seeking his favour or to solve romantic problems. One of the problems is personal to Aesop, since he is betrothed to the governor's daughter, who detests him and has a young admirer with whom she is in love. There is very little action, the play serving as a platform for the recitation of free verse fables at frequent intervals. These include The Fox and the Weasel, The Fox and the Mask, The Belly and the Other Members, the Town Mouse and the Country Mouse, the Fox and the Crow, the Crab and her Daughter, The Frog and the Ox, the Cook and the Swan, The Wolf and the Lamb, The Mountain in Labour, and The Man with two Mistresses. Two others – The Nightingale, The Lark and the Butterfly – appear original to the author, while a third, The Doves and the Vulture, is in fact an adapted version of The Frogs and the Sun.

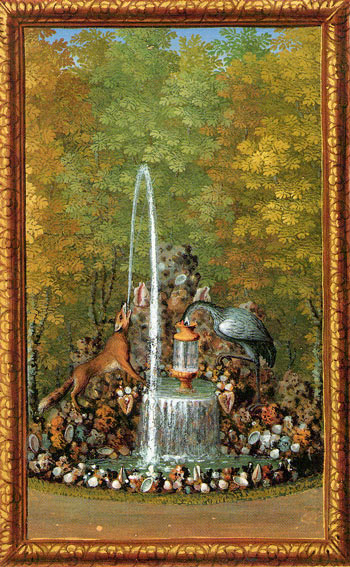
Dramatisation of a different sort: the former statues of "The Fox and the Crane" in the labyrinth of Versailles.

Esope à la cour is more of a moral satire, most scenes being set pieces for the application of fables to moral problems, but to supply romantic interest Aesop's mistress Rhodope is introduced. Among the sixteen fables included, only four derive from La Fontaine – The Heron and the Fish, the Lion and the Mouse, the Dove and the Ant, the Sick Lion – while a fifth borrows a moral from another of his but alters the details, and a sixth has as apologue a maxim of François de La Rochefoucauld. After a modest few performances, the piece later grew in popularity and remained in the repertory until 1817. Boursault's play was also influential in Italy and twice translated. It appeared from Bologna in 1719 under the title L'Esopo in Corte, translated by Antonio Zaniboni, and as Le Favole di Esopa alla Corte from Venice in 1747, translated by Gasparo Gozzi. The same translator was responsible for a version of Esope à la ville (Esopo in città, Venice, 1748); then in 1798 there was an anonymous Venetian three-act adaptation, Le Favole di Esopa, ossia Esopo in città. In England the play was adapted under the title Aesop by John Vanbrugh and first performed at the Theatre Royal, Drury Lane in London in 1697, remaining popular for the next twenty years.

In the 20th century individual fables by Aesop began to be adapted to animated cartoons, most notably in France and the United States. Cartoonist Paul Terry began his own series, called Aesop's Film Fables, in 1921 but by the time this was taken over by Van Beuren Studios in 1928 the story lines had little connection with any fable of Aesop's. In the early 1960s, animator Jay Ward created a television series of short cartoons called Aesop and Son which were first aired as part of The Rocky and Bullwinkle Show. Actual fables were spoofed to result in a pun based on the original moral. Two fables are also featured in the 1971 TV movie Aesop's Fables in the US. Here Aesop is a black story teller who relates two turtle fables, The Tortoise and the Eagle and the Tortoise and the Hare to a couple of children who wander into an enchanted grove. The fables themselves are shown as cartoons.

Between 1989 and 1991, fifty Aesop-based fables were reinterpreted on French television as fr:Les Fables géométriques and later issued on DVD. These featured a cartoon in which the characters appeared as an assembly of animated geometric shapes, accompanied by Pierre Perret's slang versions of La Fontaine's original poem. In 1983 there was an extended manga version of the fables made in Japan, Isoppu monogatari, and there has also been a Chinese television series for children based on the stories.

There have also been several dramatic productions for children based on elements of Aesop's life and including the telling of some fables, although most were written as purely local entertainments. Among these was Canadian writer Robertson Davies' A Masque of Aesop (1952), which was set at his trial in Delphi and allows the defendant to tell the fables The Belly and the Members, The Town Mouse and the Country Mouse and The Cock and the Jewel while challenging prevailing social attitudes.

== Musical treatments ==
While musical settings of La Fontaine's Fables began appearing in France within a few decades of their publication, it was not until the 19th century that composers began to take their inspiration directly from Aesop. One of the earliest was Charles Valentin Alkan's Le festin d'Ésope ("Aesop's Feast", 1857), a set of piano variations in which each is said to depict a different animal or scene from Aesop's fables. In Victorian England there were several piano arrangements of fables versified (with no particular skill) by their composers. 1847 saw the anonymous Selection of Aesop's Fables Versified and Set to Music with Symphonies and Accompaniments for the Piano Forte, which contained 28 fables. It was followed in that same year by Olivia Buckley Dussek's selection, illustrated by Thomas Onwhyn. Twelve were also set by W. Langton Williams (c. 1832–1896) in his Aesop's Fables, versified & arranged for the piano forte (London, 1870s), the jocular wording of which was strongly deprecated by The Musical Times.

More were to follow in the 20th century, with seven settings in Mabel Wood Hill's Aesop's Fables Interpreted Through Music (New York, 1920), with the fable's moral at the head of each piece. Many of these works were specifically aimed at young people. They also included Edward Hughes' Songs from Aesop's fables for children's voices and piano (1965) and Arwel Hughes's similarly titled work for unison voices. More recently, the American composer Robert J. Bradshaw (b.1970) dedicated his 3rd Symphony (2005) to the fables with a programme note explaining that the work's purpose "is to excite young musicians and audiences to take an interest in art music". Five more fables set for choir are featured in Bob Chilcott's Aesop's Fables (2008).

Werner Egk's early settings in Germany were aimed at children too. His Der Löwe und die Maus (The Lion and the Mouse 1931) was a singspiel drama for small orchestra and children's choir; aimed at 12- to 14-year-olds, it was built on an improvisation by the composer's own children. He followed this with Der Fuchs und der Rabe (The Fox and the Crow) in 1932. Hans Poser's Die Fabeln des Äsop (O 28, 1956) was set for accompanied men's chorus and uses Martin Luther's translation of six. Others who have set German texts for choir include Herbert Callhoff (1963) and Andre Asriel (1972).

The commonest approach in building a musical bridge to children has involved using a narrator with musical backing. Following the example of Sergei Prokoviev in "Peter and the Wolf" (1936), Vincent Persichetti set six for narrator and orchestra in his Fables (O 23 1943). Richard Maltz also composed his Aesop's Fables (1993) to introduce the instruments of the orchestra to elementary students and to teach them about the elements of music, and Daniel Dorff's widely performed 3 Fun Fables (1996) has contrasting instruments interpreting characters: in "The Fox and the Crow" it is trumpet and contrabass; in "The Dog and Its Reflection" it is trombone and violin, harp and percussion; in "The Tortoise and the Hare" it is contrabassoon and clarinet. Others simply adapt the narrator's voice to a musical backing. They include Scott Watson's Aesop's Fables and Anthony Plog's set of five for narrator, horn and piano (1989).

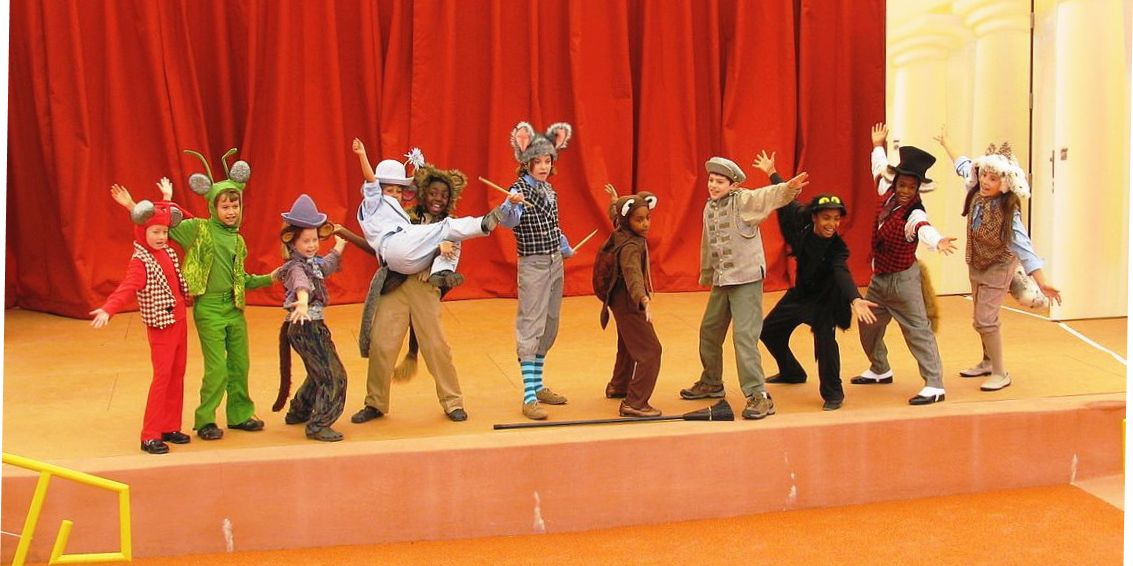
Finale of an American performance of Aesop's Fables

A different strategy is to adapt the telling to popular musical genres. Australian musician David P Shortland chose ten fables for his recording Aesop Go HipHop (2012), where the stories are given a hip hop narration and the moral is underlined in a lyrical chorus. The American William Russo's approach to popularising his Aesop's Fables (1971) was to make of it a rock opera. This incorporates nine, each only introduced by the narrator before the music and characters take over. Instead of following the wording of one of the more standard fable collections, as other composers do, the performer speaks in character. Thus in "The Crow and the Fox" the bird introduces himself with, "Ahm not as pretty as mah friends and I can't sing so good, but, uh, I can steal food pretty goddam good!" Other composers who have created operas for children have been Martin Kalmanoff in Aesop the fabulous fabulist (1969), David Ahlstom in his one-act Aesop's Fables (1986), and David Edgar Walther with his set of four "short operatic dramas", some of which were performed in 2009 and 2010. There have also been local ballet treatments of the fables for children in the US by such companies as Berkshire Ballet and Nashville Ballet.

A musical, Aesop's Fables by British playwright Peter Terson, first produced in 1983, was performed by the Isango Portobello company, directed by Mark Dornford-May at the Fugard Theatre in Cape Town, South Africa, in 2010. The play tells the story of the black slave Aesop, who learns that freedom is earned and kept through being responsible. His teachers are the animal characters he meets on his journeys. The fables they suggest include the Tortoise and the Hare, the Lion and the Goat, the Wolf and the Crane, the Frogs Who Desired a King and three others, brought to life through a musical score featuring mostly marimbas, vocals and percussion. A colourful treatment was Brian Seward's Aesop's Fabulous Fables (2009) in Singapore, which mixes a typical musical with Chinese dramatic techniques.

Use of other languages elsewhere in the world have included a setting of four Latin texts in the Czech composer Ilja Hurník's Ezop for mixed choir and orchestra (1964) and the setting of two as a Greek opera by Giorgos Sioras (b. 1952) in 1998. And in 2010 Lefteris Kordis launched his 'Aesop Project', a setting of seven fables which mixed traditional East Mediterranean and Western Classical musical textures, combined with elements of jazz. After an English recitation by male narrator, a female singer's rendition of the Greek wording was accompanied by an octet.

== Select fables ==
=== Titles A–F ===
- Aesop and the Ferryman
- The Ant and the Grasshopper
- The Ape and the Dolphin
- The Ape and the Fox
- The Ass and his Masters
- The Ass and the Pig
- The Ass Carrying an Image
- The Ass in the Lion's Skin
- The Astrologer who Fell into a Well
- The Bald Man and the Fly
- The Bear and the Travelers
- The Beaver
- The Belly and the Other Members
- The Bird-catcher and the Blackbird
- The Bird in Borrowed Feathers
- The Boy Who Cried Wolf
- The Bulls and the Lion
- The Cat and the Mice
- The Crab and the Fox
- The Cock and the Jewel
- The Cock, the Dog and the Fox
- The Crow and the Pitcher
- The Crow and the Sheep
- The Crow and the Snake
- The Deer without a Heart
- The Dog and Its Reflection
- The Dog and the Sheep
- The Dog and the Wolf
- The Dogs and the Lion's Skin
- The Dove and the Ant
- The Eagle and the Beetle
- The Eagle and the Fox
- The Eagle Wounded by an Arrow
- Elpis
- The Farmer and his Sons
- The Farmer and the Sea
- The Farmer and the Stork
- The Farmer and the Viper
- The Fir and the Bramble
- The Fisherman and his Flute
- The Fisherman and the Little Fish
- The Fly and the Ant
- The Fly in the Soup
- The Fowler and the Snake
- The Fox and the Crow
- The Fox and the Grapes
- The Fox and the Lion
- The Fox and the Mask
- The Fox and the Sick Lion
- The Fox and the Stork
- The Fox and the Weasel
- The Fox and the Woodman
- The Fox, the Flies and the Hedgehog
- The Frightened Hares
- The Frog and the Fox
- The Frog and the Mouse
- The Frog and the Ox
- The Frogs and the Sun
- The Frogs Who Desired a King
- The Fuller and the Charcoal Burner

=== Titles G–O ===
- The Goat and the Vine
- The Goose that Laid the Golden Eggs
- The Hare in flight
- Hercules and the Wagoner
- The Honest Woodcutter
- Horkos, the God of Oaths
- The Horse and the Donkey
- The Horse that Lost its Liberty
- The Impertinent Insect
- The Jar of Blessings
- The Kite and the Doves
- The Lion and the Mouse
- The Lion Grown Old
- The Lion in Love
- The Lion's Share
- The Lion, the Bear and the Fox
- The Lion, the Boar and the Vultures
- The Man and the Lion
- The Man with Two Mistresses
- The Mischievous Dog
- The Miser and his Gold
- Momus Criticizes the Creations of the Gods
- The Moon and her Mother
- The Mountain in Labour
- The Mouse and the Oyster
- The North Wind and the Sun
- The Oak and the Reed
- The Old Man and Death
- The Old Man and his Sons
- The Old Man and the Ass
- The Old Woman and the Doctor
- The Old Woman and the Wine-jar
- The Oxen and the Creaking Cart

=== Titles R–Z ===
- The Rivers and the Sea
- The Rose and the Amaranth
- The Satyr and the Traveller
- The Shepherd and the Sea
- The Shipwrecked Man and the Sea
- The Sick Kite
- The Snake and the Crab
- The Snake and the Farmer
- The Snake in the Thorn Bush
- The Stag and the Vine
- The Statue of Hermes
- The Swan and the Goose
- The Tortoise and the Birds
- The Tortoise and the Hare
- The Town Mouse and the Country Mouse
- The Travellers and the Plane Tree
- The Trees and the Bramble
- The Trumpeter Taken Captive
- The Two Pots
- The Walnut Tree
- War and his Bride
- Washing the Ethiopian white
- The Weasel and Aphrodite
- The Wolf and the Crane
- The Wolf and the Lamb
- The Wolf and the Shepherds
- The Woodcutter and the Trees
- The Young Man and the Swallow
- Zeus and the Tortoise

== Fables wrongly attributed to Aesop ==
- An Ass eating Thistles
- The Bear and the Bees
- The Bear and the Gardener
- Belling the Cat (also known as The Mice in Council)
- The Blind Man and the Lame
- The Boy and the Filberts
- Chanticleer and the Fox
- The Dog in the Manger
- The Drowned Woman and her Husband
- The Eel and the Snake
- The Elm and the Vine
- The Fox and the Cat
- The Gourd and the Palm-tree
- The Hawk and the Nightingale
- The Hare and many friends
- The Hedgehog and the Snake
- The Heron and the Fish
- Jumping from the frying pan into the fire
- The Milkmaid and her Pail
- The Miller, his Son and the Donkey
- The Monkey and the Cat
- The Priest and the Wolf
- The Scorpion and the Frog
- The Shepherd and the Lion
- Still waters run deep
- The Vultures and the Pigeons
- The Wolf in Sheep's Clothing
