= The Priest and the Wolf =

Ancient fable

The Priest and the Wolf is an ancient fable of West Asian origin that was included in collections of Aesop's Fables in mediaeval Europe. It illustrates how even education cannot change one's basic nature and tells how a priest tries to teach a wolf to read.

== The fable's journey ==
There is a mere reference to what was already an established fable in the West Asian Story of Ahiqar. Not enough remains of the earlier Aramaic papyrus dating from about 500 BCE, but the story is contained in the next oldest version in Syriac and repeated in still later Arabic, Armenian and Slavonic adaptations. Ahiqar has been betrayed by his nephew Nadan, who asks for a second chance once his behaviour has been exposed. Ahiqar replies with a series of parables indicating that what is bred in the bone will not leave the flesh, including mention of how 'they brought the wolf to the house of the scribe: the master said to him 'Aleph, Beth'; the wolf said 'Kid, Lamb'. Later versions of the fable make it clear that when the master tries to teach the wolf the Semitic alphabet, of which Aleph and Beth are the first two letters, it replaces them with the similar-sounding names of the animals it likes to eat.

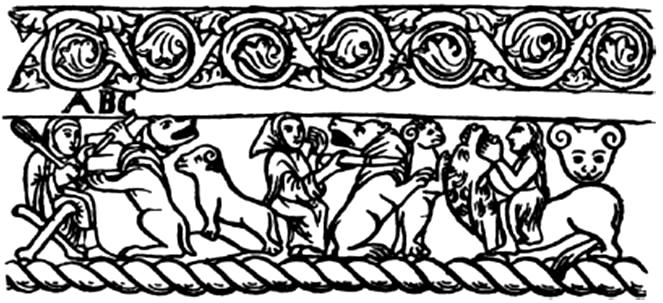
The wolf learning its ABC on a capital in the minster of Freiburg in Breisgau, c. 1150

If there ever was a Greek equivalent to this fable attributed to Aesop, it has not survived. However, it reappears in Mediaeval Europe as a very popular story, not simply in literary texts but in church architecture. There is a bare mention in a Papal bull of 1096: "A wolf was put to learning letters, but when the master said 'A', the wolf answered 'lamb' (agnellum)", where again the beast's obsession with food is reflected in his choice of an animal beginning with A. Soon after, versions began to appear in fable collections along with many of Aesopic origin. They include the Anglo Latin Romulus, where it is titled De presbyterio et vulpo (The priest and the wolf); the Anglo French Marie de France, which follows this collection in drawing the moral that 'the mouth will betray where the heart is'; and the Latin fables of Odo of Cheriton. The story was also incorporated as an episode in Nivardus of Ghent's beast epic, Ysengrimus (V. 540–560) and a mediaeval German legend collected by Jacob Grimm, "Der Wolf in der Schuole".

The story was equally popular as an illustration in manuscripts and as a motif in church architecture. A chronological listing of the sculpted images suggests a geographical movement from 12th century Italy northwards to France, Switzerland and Germany.
