= The Boy and the Filberts =

Fable

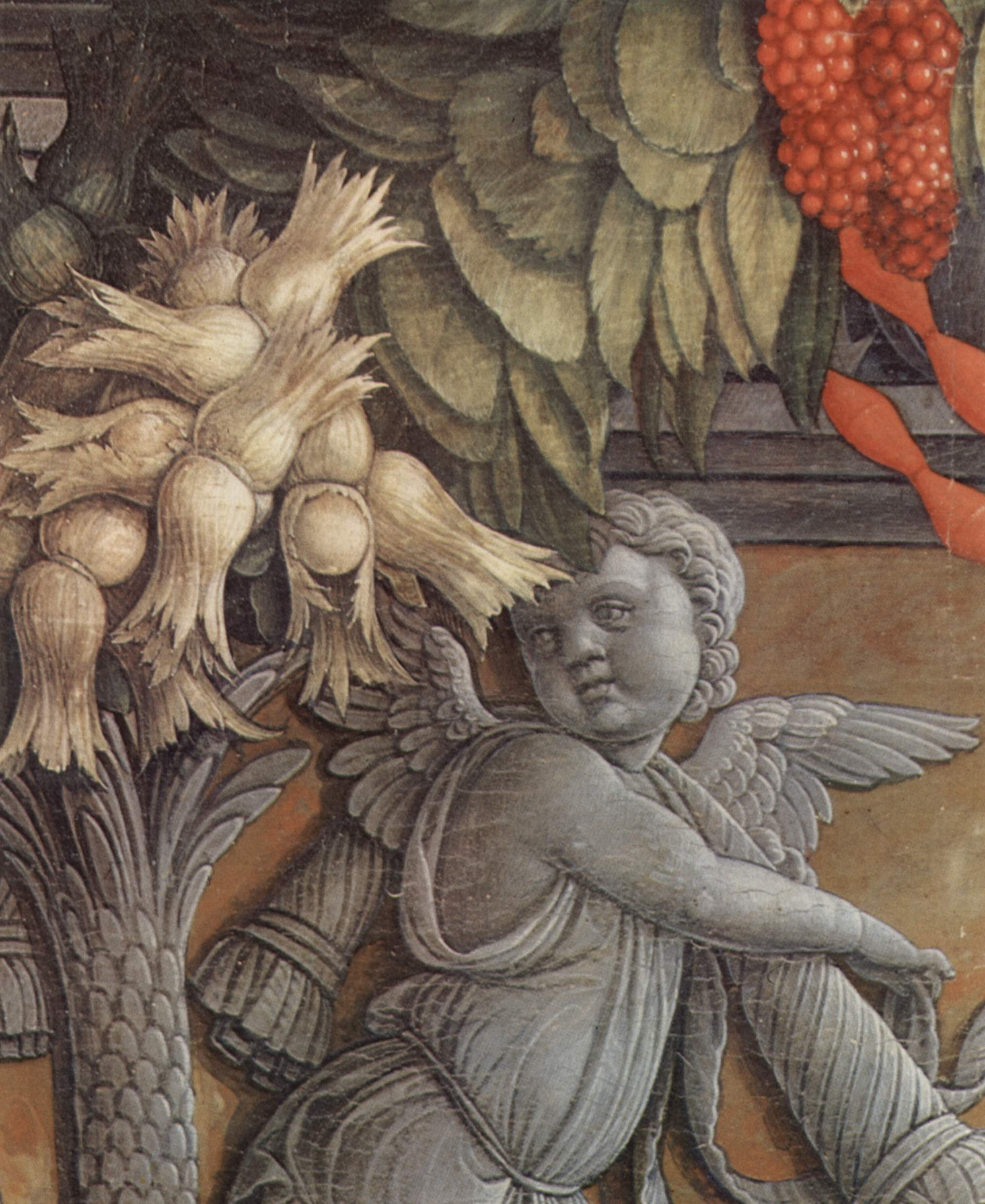
Mantegna's painting of a boy and hazelnuts

The Boy and the Filberts is a fable related to greed and appears as Aarne-Thompson type 68A. The story is credited to Aesop but there is no evidence to support this. It is not included in either the Perry Index or in Laura Gibbs' inclusive collection (2002).

== The story ==
The Greek Stoic philosopher Epictetus briefly mentioned the fable in his Discourses as an analogy of man's getting less as a result of believing he needs more. The earliest English appearance of the story is in a translation of Antoine Houdar de la Motte's One Hundred New Court Fables (1721), where it is credited to Epictetus and illustrates the proposition that one should 'be contented with the middle state'. A boy puts his hand into a pitcher of figs and filberts and grasps so many that he cannot withdraw his fist through the narrow opening. When he bursts into tears of frustration, a bystander advises him to take only half the quantity.

The story was given further currency by appearing in Robert Dodsley's Select fables of Esop and other fabulists (1765) with the moral that 'the surest way to gain our ends is to moderate our desires'. It was retold in verse in Old Friends in a New Dress, a popular collection written specially for children by Richard Scrafton Sharpe, originally published in 1807. The moral drawn there is that learning comes only with application - 'True wisdom is not learned at once'. The fable was attributed to Aesop in later 19th century collections and also found its way to the United States.

The tale resembles the traditional story of how to catch a monkey. Idries Shah recounts the fable as a teaching story in his Tales of the Dervishes, where cherries in a jar are used to trap the animal. The emphasis in this tale is on the irony and economy of the trap: "The monkey was free, but he was captured. The hunter had used the cherry and the bottle, but he still had them." Shah credits the story to Khwaja Ali Ramitani, who died in 1306.

English accounts of a similar practice began to circulate in Victorian times. It involved placing some food in a coconut or other container which would then trap the animal, since it would not unclench its fist. From this tradition originates the modern idiom of 'a monkey trap', used of a clever trap of any sort that owes its success to the ineptitude or gullibility of the victim. It also underlies the Brazilian proverb Macaco velho não mete a mão em cumbuca (An old monkey will not stick his hand into a jar), with the meaning that an experienced hand cannot be bamboozled.
