= The Crab and the Fox =

Aesop's fable

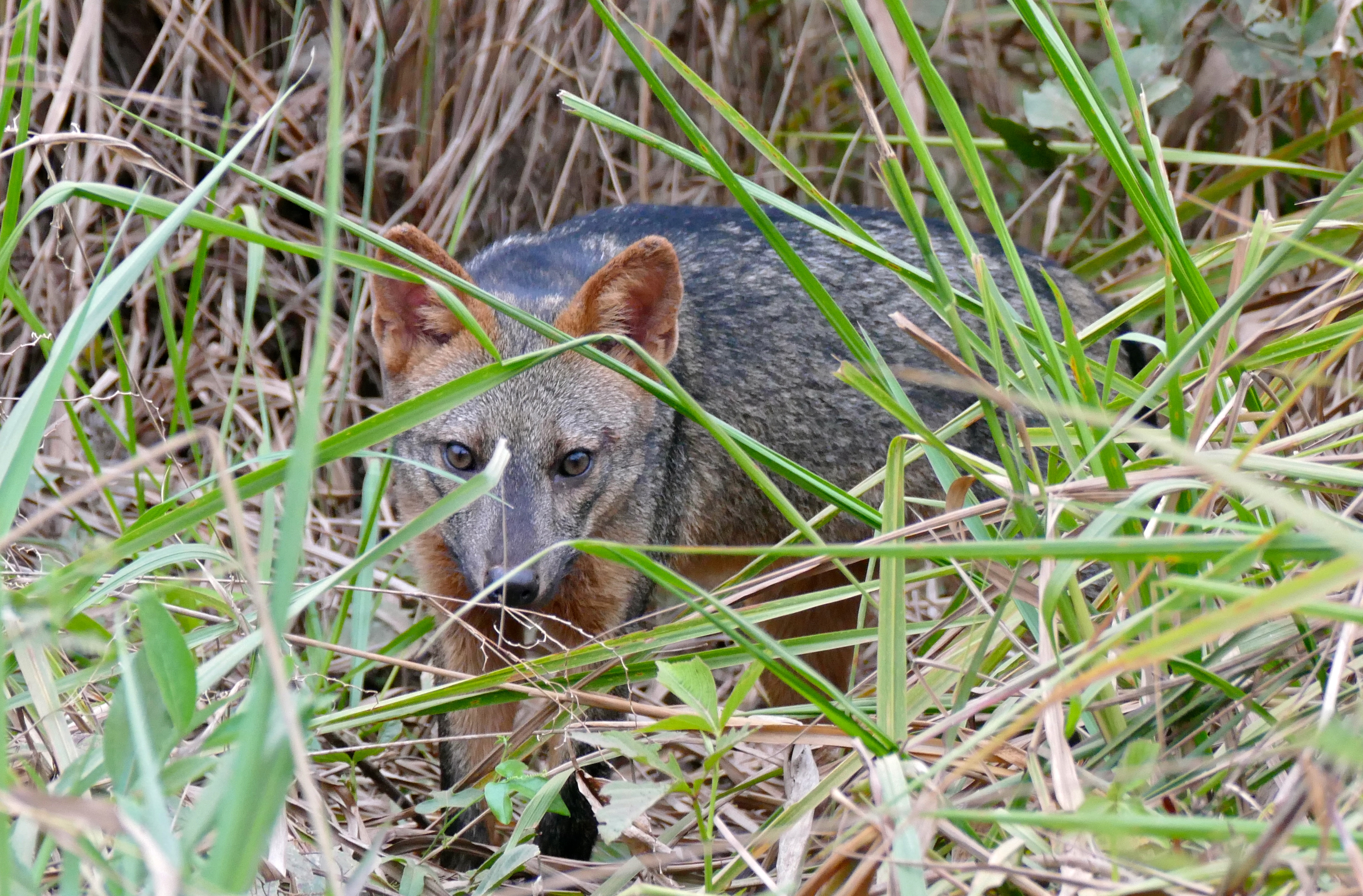
A crab-eating fox

The tale of the crab and the fox is of Greek origin and is counted as one of Aesop's fables; it is numbered 116 in the Perry Index. The moral is that one comes to grief through not sticking to one's allotted role in life

== The fable ==
The Greek version of the story (Καρκῖνος καὶ Ἀλώπηξ) is pithily told and concerns a crab that abandons the seashore and crawls into a neighbouring meadow where it is eaten by a fox. The comment there is that "this fable shows that people are bound to fail when they abandon their familiar pursuits and take up a business they know nothing about".

The fable appeared in the Medici manuscript in the 15th century and later among those recorded by Roger L'Estrange (1692). In Victorian times the story appeared in George Fyler Townsend's new translation with the moral "Contentment with our lot is an element of happiness".

== Natural history ==
Crabs are not a natural food for foxes but anciently they were confused with crayfish and there is a freshwater species of crayfish that is eaten by foxes in the Balkan Danube region. There is in addition a South American Crab-eating Fox about which Aesop could not have known.
