= The Young Man and the Swallow =

Fable by Aesop

The young man and the swallow (which also has the Victorian title of "The spendthrift and the swallow") is one of Aesop's Fables and is numbered 169 in the Perry Index. It is associated with the ancient proverb 'One swallow doesn't make a summer'.

== The fable ==
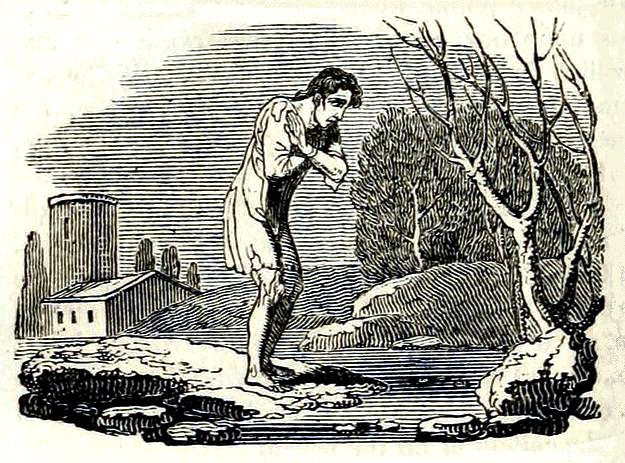
A woodcut from the 1814 edition of Samuel Croxall's The Fables of Aesop

The story appears only in Greek sources in ancient times and may have been invented to explain the proverb 'One swallow does not make a spring' (μία γὰρ χελιδὼν ἔαρ οὐ ποιεῖ), which is recorded in Aristotle's Nicomachean Ethics (I.1098a18). Other instances of where fables appear to derive from proverbs include The Mountain in Labour, recorded by Phaedrus, and Jumping from the frying pan into the fire by Laurentius Abstemius.

The fable is about a young man who spends all his money on gambling and luxurious living until he has only a cloak to keep off the weather. Seeing an unusually early swallow fly by, the man concludes that spring has come and sells his cloak so as to use the proceeds to mend his fortune with a last bet. Not only does he lose his money but cold weather closes in again. Finding the swallow frozen to death, the young man blames it for deceiving him. In later versions this takes place on the bank of a frozen brook and the young man also dies of cold.

Although the fable was translated into Latin prose during the 15th century, it was not included in European vernacular collections of the time but begins to be recorded in the 16th. Poetic versions are included in French in Les Fables d'Esope Phrygien, mises en Ryme Francoise (1542) and in Latin by Hieronymus Osius (1564). In England the fable does not appear in collections before the 17th century, but the proverb, in the form 'One swallow does not make a summer', is recorded a century earlier. Erasmus includes its Latin version in his Adagia and the proverb is common throughout Europe.
