= The Fox and the Weasel =

Aesop's fable

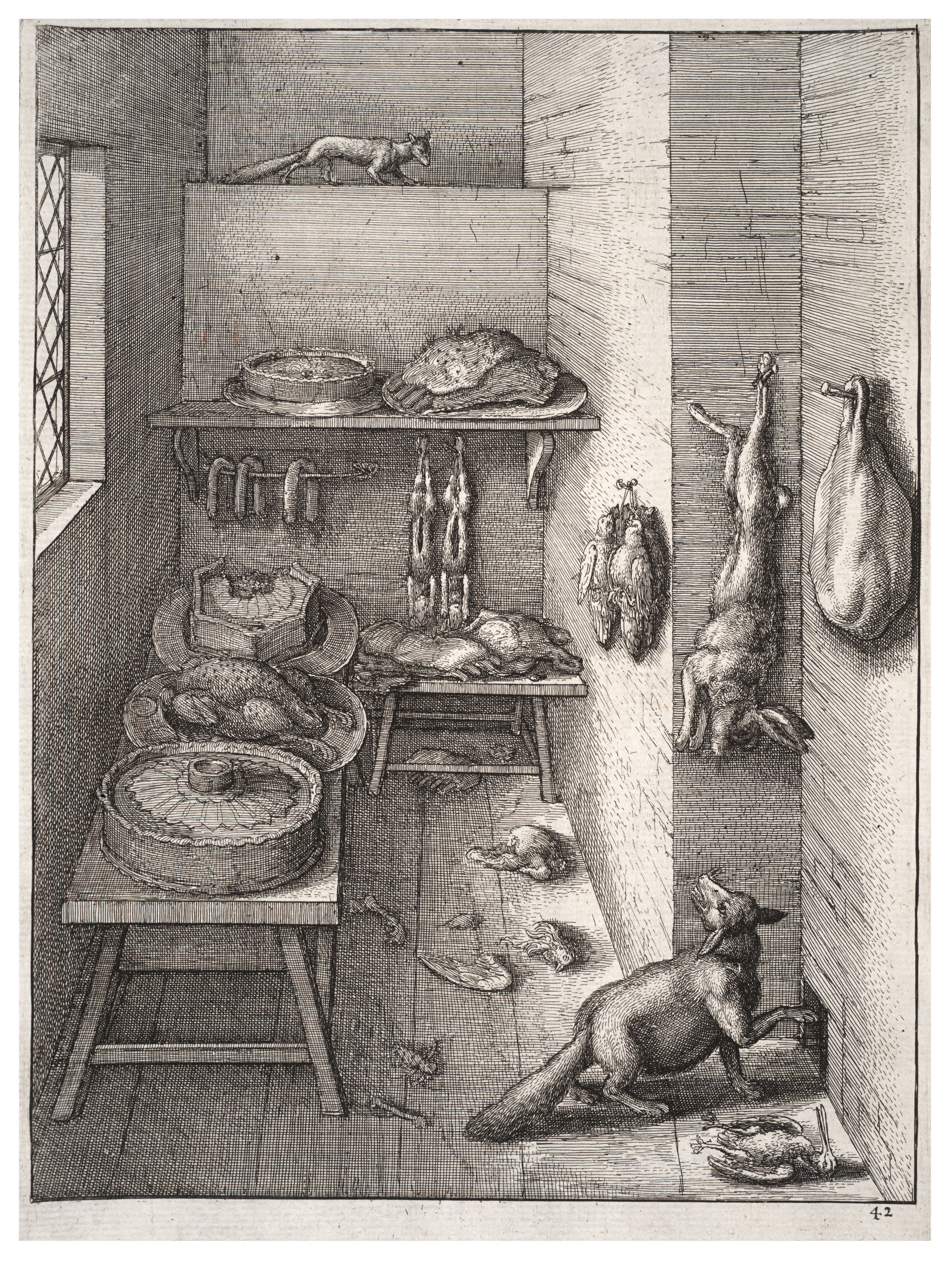
Wenceslas Hollar's illustration of the Latin story

The Fox and the Weasel is a title used to cover a complex of fables in which a number of other animals figure in a story with the same basic situation involving the unfortunate effects of greed. Of Greek origin, it is counted as one of Aesop's Fables and is numbered 24 in the Perry Index.

== Versions ==
In Greek versions of the story, a lean and hungry fox finds food left by shepherds in the hollow of a tree but is unable to get out again because it has eaten so much. Another fox hears its cries of distress and advises it that it will have to remain there until it becomes as thin as when it entered. Because there were no Latin sources, the fable remained unknown to other European countries until the revival of Greek learning in the Renaissance.

The Greek story spread both eastwards and westwards. It reappears in the Babylonian Talmud as a story about a single fox that can only enter a vineyard through a small hole in the fence and has to starve itself to manage this. Once inside, it gorges itself but then cannot get out until it is as thin as when it entered. The sage Geniba recounts this in a meditation on the text "As a man came out of his mother's womb naked, so shall he go forth as he came" (Ecclesiastes 5:15). As in the tale, one can take nothing of the world's goods into death.

A different version of the Greek story was known in Rome, although no fable collection in which it figured has survived. However, it was perpetuated in one of Horace's poetical epistles to Maecenas (I.7, lines 29–35):

Once it chanced that a pinched little fox had crept through a narrow chink into a bin of corn and, when well fed, was trying with stuffed stomach to get out again, but in vain. To him quoth a weasel hard by: "If you wish to escape from there, you must go back lean through the narrow gap which you entered when lean."

It was this version which was to influence most of those that came later, although there are a variety of them, depending on the country where they are told. But, as in the context of Horace's poem, all teach the lesson of moderating one's ambitions since superfluity only brings trouble.

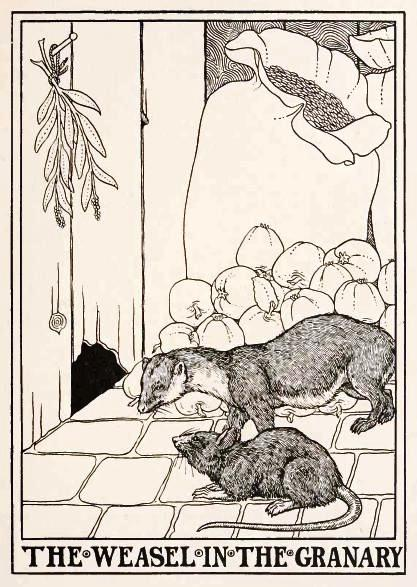
Percy Billinghurst's 1900 illustration of the La Fontaine version

One of the earliest appearances in English sources was in John Ogilby's editions of Aesop's fables in which a fox becomes trapped in a larder and is advised by a weasel that is also present there. In Sir Roger L'Estrange's retelling only a few decades later, the fox is trapped in a hen-roost and receives the advice from a weasel that is passing outside. Samuel Croxall tells his moralised story of 'a little starveling, thin-gutted rogue of a mouse' who, rather more plausibly than Horace's fox, creeps into a corn basket and attracts a weasel with its cries for help when it cannot get out. More or less the same story was told at the start of the following century by Brooke Boothby in verse and Thomas Bewick in prose.

In French versions it is a weasel that becomes trapped in a granary. In La Fontaine's Fables, the advice to slim is given by a rat within the building while in Edmé Boursault's drama Esope à la ville the advice comes from a passing fox. The English playwright John Vanbrugh based his comedy of Aesop on the latter (1697) but unaccountably makes yet another animal the protagonist. His Aesop relates that a famished goat squeezes into a well-stocked barn and realises without any intermediary that fasting is its only chance of getting back out. Nevertheless, Boursault's version was sufficiently known in England as to figure five years later in Thomas Yalden's pamphlet of political verses, Aesop at Court.

== Adaptations ==
In 1518 the Italian poet Ludovico Ariosto began a series of satires in imitation of Horace. The first of these adapted the Epistle to Maecenas but related a rather different tale in which an ass finds its way through a cracked wall to a stack of corn and is counselled by a mouse when it cannot get out.

In England the story was adapted by A. A. Milne as the second chapter in his Winnie-the-Pooh (1926) 'in which Pooh goes visiting and gets into a tight place'. In this case, the bear overindulges in honey and condensed milk while visiting Rabbit and becomes stuck when trying to exit the burrow. It takes a week of starvation before he can be extricated.
