= The Frightened Hares =

Aesop's fable

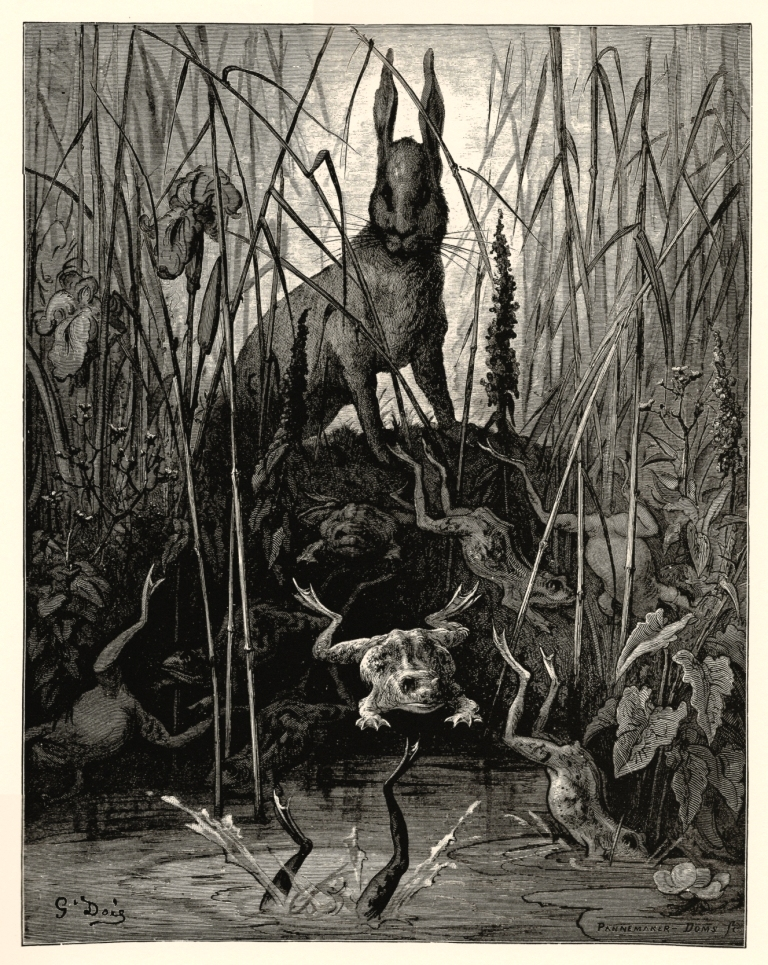
Gustave Doré's print of La Fontaine's fable, 1867

Hares are proverbially timid and a number of fables have been based on this behaviour. The best known, often titled "The Hares and the Frogs", appears among Aesop's Fables and is numbered 138 in the Perry Index. As well as having an Asian analogue, there have been variant versions over the centuries.

== Stampeding before doom ==
The oldest form of a fable involving a stampede started by a hare appears in the form of a cumulative tale known in the Buddhist scriptures as the Duddubha Jataka (332). On hearing the sound of a falling fruit, a hare sets all the other animals fleeing in the belief that the earth was collapsing. There the story is associated with the Indian idiom 'the sound the hare heard', meaning an impossibility. A much later Western equivalent is the folk tale of Henny Penny, where the associated idiom is 'the sky is falling'.

In the Aesopic fable of "The Hares and the Frogs" the stampede is more limited. There are several versions in both Greek and Latin. In some the hares are set in motion by the sound of wind in the leaves; in others they call a meeting in which they come to the conclusion that their lives are so perpetually under threat that they may as well fling themselves into the river. As they are dashing towards it, however, they disturb the frogs on the bank who all leap into the water. Seeing this, a more thoughtful hare calls off the decision to kill themselves; if there are some creatures who can be frightened by hares, then their own lot cannot be as bad as they imagined.

In the story retold about 1190 in Marie de France's Ysopet, the hares have decided to move to another land but halt when they see frogs leaping into a pond to escape them and come to the conclusion that "never will they find a kingdom, or come to a place on this earth, where everyone may live without fear, work or sorrow". The Jewish version of Marie's near contemporary, Berechiah ha-Nakdan, makes the band of emigrants terrified even of the croaking of frogs at night before deciding to return home.

Two Neo-Latin poems are dedicated to the fable by Hieronymus Osius in his collection of 1564. In the first of these, he draws a parallel with human suffering and remarks that no-one really wishes to die; in the shorter poem that follows, the conclusion is that learning to overcome our fears is part of growing up. Eduard de Dene's Dutch version of the tale makes an emblematic appearance under the title "A stout heart is the remedy for fear", where it is given a religious interpretation. The illustrator of that book was Marcus Gheeraerts the Elder, who eventually fled to England. His woodcut of the subject was to be reproduced there as a trencher, about the edge of which the gist of its moral is epitomised as needing to fear destruction of the soul rather than of the body. A century later, in 1668, the Classical story was told with stylish panache of a single hare in La Fontaine's Fables (II.14).

During mediaeval times, some commentaries on the fable underlined the necessity of remaining philosophically contented. This theme was also taken up when the fable was included in Robert Dodsley's collection and subsequently reprinted in Thomas Bewick's illustrated edition of The Fables of Aesop in 1818. There it ends with the verse reflection,

The miseries of half mankind unknown,
Fools vainly think no sorrows like their own;
But view the world and you will learn to bear
Misfortunes well, since all men have their share.

The same conclusion, that one should commiserate with the sufferings of others, was also the conclusion of the Neo-Latin retelling by Pantaleon Candidus at the start of the 17th century.

== In the arts ==
Under the Latin title of Lepores et ranae a Czech translation by Pavel Jurkovic was set by Ilja Hurník as the final piece in his Ezop for mixed choir and orchestra (1964); and under the title "The Rabbits and the Frogs" the story was set by Howard J. Buss as the fifth item in his "Fables from Aesop" (2002).
