= Antoine Bigot =

French writer, poet, and translator

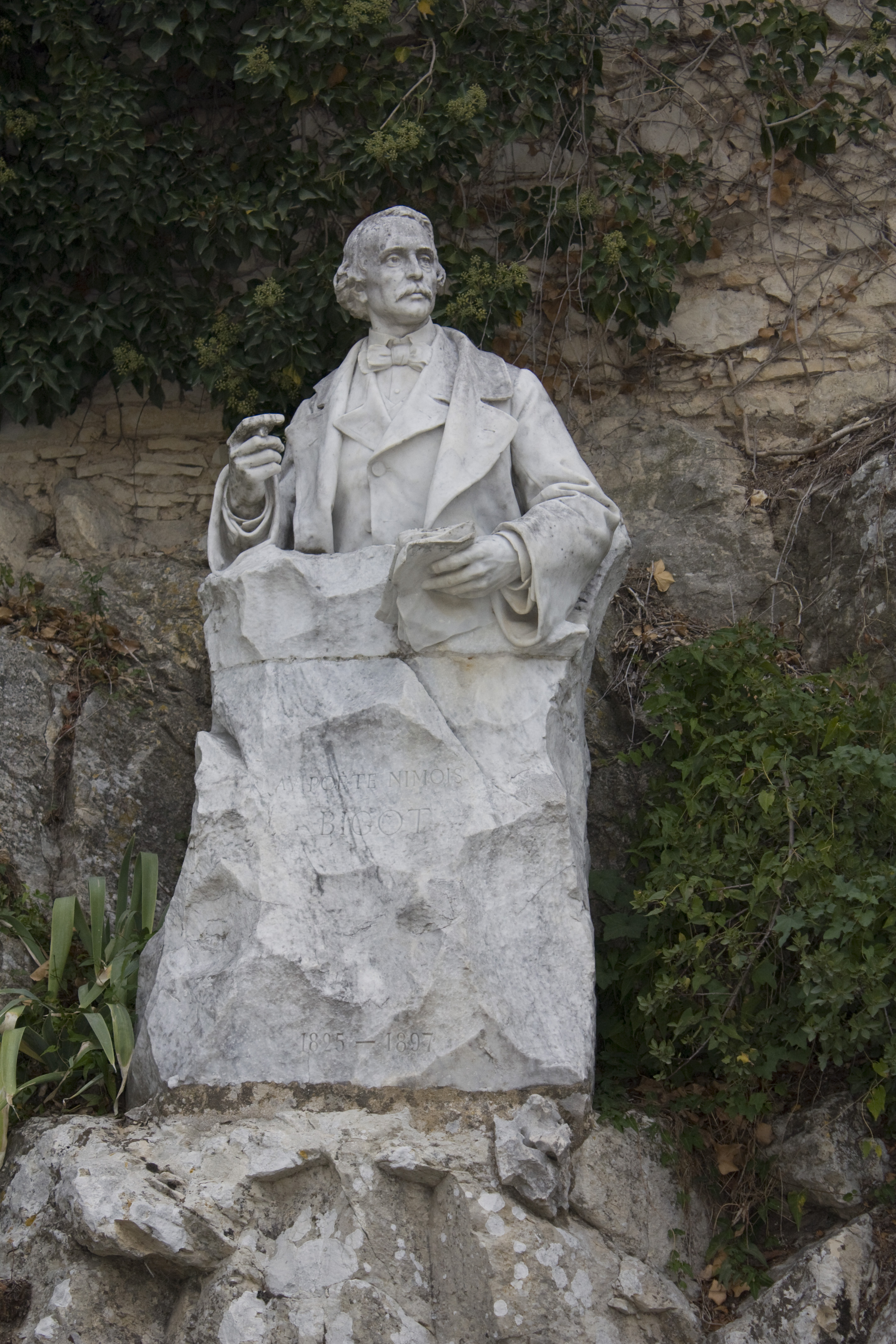

Antoine Hippolyte Bigot (French: [ɑ̃twan ipɔlit biɡo]; February 27, 1825 – January 7, 1897), was a French writer, poet, and translator in the Nîmes Provençal dialect of Occitan.

== Biography ==
Born in Nîmes into a Protestant family, Antoine Bigot was able to be educated and therefore escape the manual farm labor so prevalent at that time and was intended to learn a trade. In 1850, he met Jean Reboul and later Louis Roumieux, with whom he launched a literary career. In 1854, Frédéric Mistral and his friends founded the Provençal Occitan writers' association Félibrige and Bigot was invited to join. He wanted to praise his city (Nîmes) in his own language, his "impure dialect that is disappearing". In 1861, he became a corresponding member of the Academy of Nîmes and a full member in 1864. In 1865, he was a member of the Consistory of the Reformed Church. He died at his home on Rue Cart in Nîmes on January 7, 1897, and was buried in the Protestant cemetery in Nîmes, leaving behind a reputation as a poet. In 1903, due to the influence of his friend and successor Jean Mejean, a bust of Bigot was erected near the statue of Jean Reboul at the bottom of the grand staircase of the Jardins de la Fontaine. Gaston Doumergue, the government minister and fellow Protestant, was present at the ceremony. Bigot (Protestant and Republican) has often been seen as opposed (legitimately or not) to Reboul (Catholic and Royalist).

== Works ==
- Li Bourgadieiro, poésies patoises, by A. Bigot and L. Roumieux (1853)
- Li Griséto, poésies patoises (1854)
- Li Boutoun de guèto, poésies patoises, by A. Bigot. Fables imitées de La Fontaine (1859)
- Les Rêves du foyer, poésies (1860)
- Li Bourgadieiro, poésies patoises (1863; 1962; 1998)
- Recueil de fables patoises nouvelles (1881)
- Li Fieuyo toumbado, poésies patoises et fables nouvelles (2nd edition, augmented by new fables, 1890)
- Li Flou d'armas, poésies et fables patoises (1891)
- Les Rêves du foyer, œuvres posthumes de A. Bigot. Poésies patoises et françaises inédites (1899)
- Œuvres complètes. Poésies languedociennes et françaises. Li Bourgadiéiro. Li Fueio toumbado. Li Flou d'Ermas (précédées d'une épître en vers languedociens de Jean Reboul). Obro Poustumo. Les Rêves du foyer (précédés d'un avant-propos). Œuvres posthumes (1907; 1924; 1997)
- Fablas de Bigot : 23 fables illustrées avec leur traduction française (1991)
- Fablas de Bigot : 20 nouvelles fables illustrées avec leur traduction française (1993)
