= Eustache Le Noble =

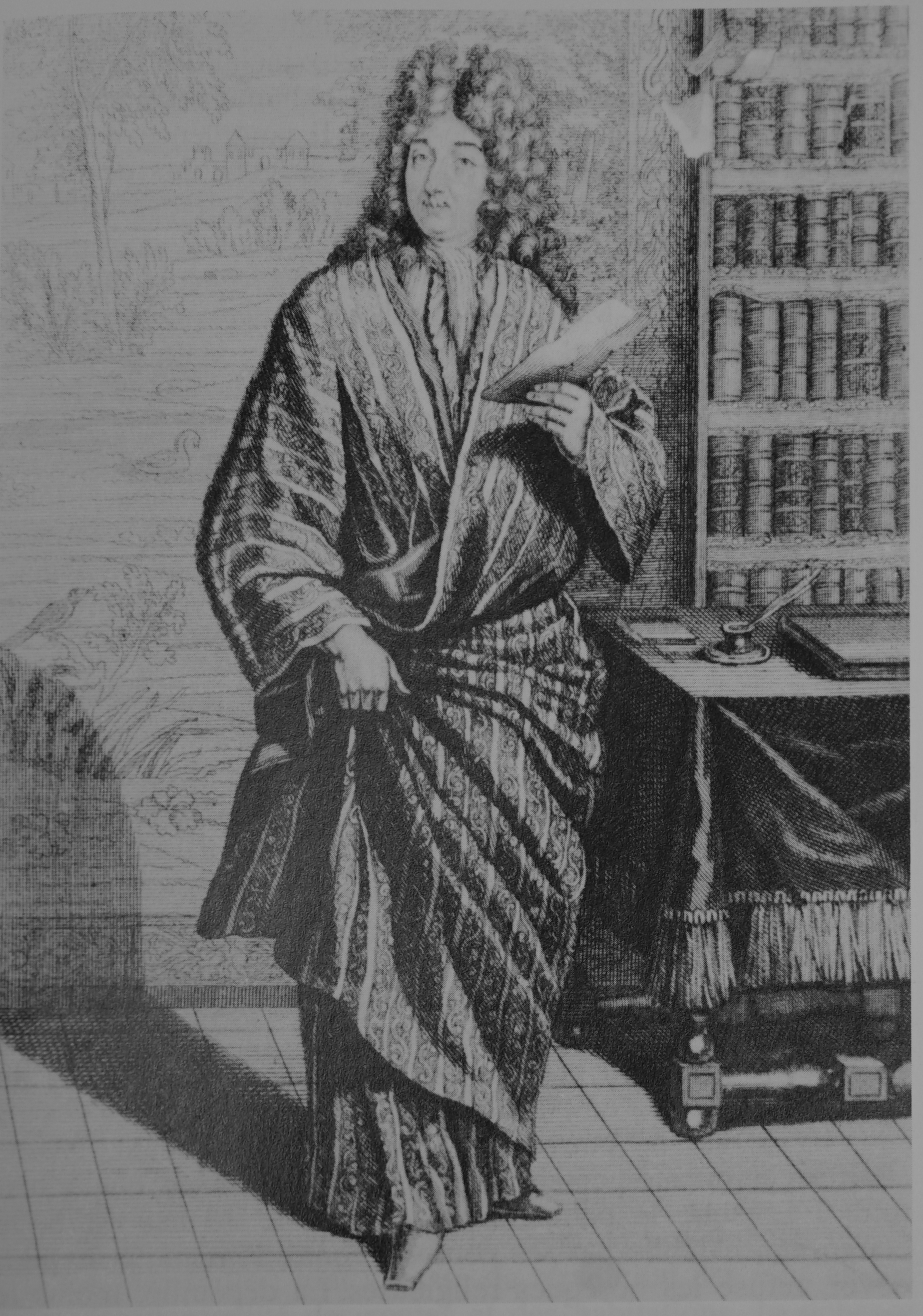
Eustache le noble 08584.jpg

Robert Le Noble (Troyes, 1643 – Paris, 31 January 1711) was a 17th-century French playwright and writer.

An attorney General at the Parlement of Metz, Le Noble led a dissipated life and after he had been condemned for having manufactured false acts, he was jailed at the Conciergerie where he fell in love with Gabrielle Perreau, la Belle Épicière, who was also imprisoned.

== Biography ==
Having found a way to get away with her, in order to make a living, he published satirical dialogues about the time topics, in which Bayle found "infinite wit and reading." The prose is clear, incisive, and frequently cut with verses which are not without merit.

Le Noble's complete works were published in Paris, 1718, 20 vol. in-12. Le Gage touché, Ildegerte, reyne de Norvège, Zulima and La Fausse Comtesse d’Isamberg have been reprinted by Éditions Slatkine in 1980.

== Sources ==
- Gustave Vapereau, Dictionnaire universel des littératures, Paris, Hachette, 1876, p. 1227
