= Romulus (fabulist) =

Legendary author

Romulus is the author, now considered a legendary figure, of versions of Aesop's Fables in Latin. These were passed down in Western Europe, and became important school texts, for early education. Romulus is supposed to have lived in the 5th century.

The Romulus of medieval tradition therefore represents a number of traditional attributions of Latin manuscripts of beast fables. These are based on prose adaptations of Phaedrus (1st century AD). The Romulus texts make up the bulk of the medieval 'Aesop'.

Scholars identify several strands of manuscripts:

- The Romulus Ordinarius (Romulus Vulgaris), 83 tales known in a 9th-century text;
- The Romulus of Vienna;
- The Romulus of Nilant, 45 fables, published in 1709 by Johan Frederik Nilant (Jean-Frédéric Nilant).

These prose works gave rise to versifications: the Novus Aesopus of Alexander Neckam, the verse Romulus often attributed to Gualterus Anglicus (Romulus of Nevelet). Further adaptation and expansion from those works built up the medieval Aesop tradition.

The Esope of Adémar de Chabannes (67 fables) is now considered to derive from the Romulus Ordinarius.

The Romulus Roberti (22 fables) is taken from the Anglo-Latin Romulus, with the four first tales from Marie de France.
