= Maurice Piron =

Belgian academic and philologist

Maurice Piron (born 23 March 1914 in Liège; died 24 February 1986) was a Belgian academic and philologist.
