= Sibusiso Nyembezi =

South African writer (1919–2000)

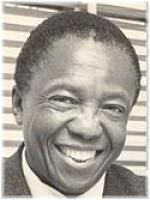
Portrait of Cyril Lincoln Sibusiso Nyembezi

Cyril Lincoln Sibusiso Nyembezi (1919–2000) was a South African writer known as a Zulu novelist, poet, scholar, teacher and editor. Inkinsela yase Mgungundlovu was made into a television series because of the popularity of the novel.

== Bibliography ==
Novels

- Mntanami! Mntanami! Lincroft books (first printing in 1950 and later entitled Ushicilelo lwesithathu in third printing, 1965)
- Ubudoda abukhulelwa (1953) Shuter and Shooter
- Inkinsela yase Mgungundlovu (1961) Shuter and Shooter

Poetry

- Imisebe yelanga (1963) Afrikaanse Pers Boekhandel
- Amahlunga aluhlaza (1963) Shuter and Shooter

Folklore

- Zulu Proverbs Johannesburg: University of the Witwatersrand
- Izibongo zamakhosi Pietermaritzburg: Shuter and Shooter.(1958)
- Inqolobane yesizwe (1966) (with Otty Ezrom Nxumalo). Pietermaritzburg: Shuter and Shooter

Translation

- Cry, The Beloved Country, by Alan Paton, translated into Zulu as Lafa elihle kakhulu (1958), Pietermaritzburg: Shuter and Shooter

Zulu language studies

- Uhlelo lwesiZulu (1956) Pietermaritzburg: Shuter and Shooter
- Learn Zulu (1958) Pietermaritzburg: Shuter and Shooter
- Compact Zulu Dictionary. London: Dent.(Isizulu)

== Relevant literature ==
- Mtumane, Zilibele and Rachel Tengetile Antones-Dlamini. "Mzobe’s choice of proverbs to convey broken love in the poem, "Isoka", in Sibusiso Nyembezi’s Amahlungu Aluhlaza." International Journal of Social Science Research and Review 5,10: 397-407. (2022).
