= Thomas Onwhyn =

Thomas Onwhyn (c.1811 – 21 January 1886) was an English artist, illustrator, engraver, satirist, and cartoonist. He also published an illustrated pirate edition of The Pickwick Papers in 1837 under the pen-name of "Samuel Weller", after Dickens's character in the book. He may have also used other pseudonyms including Peter Paul Palette. He also published tourist guides to various parts of England and Wales.

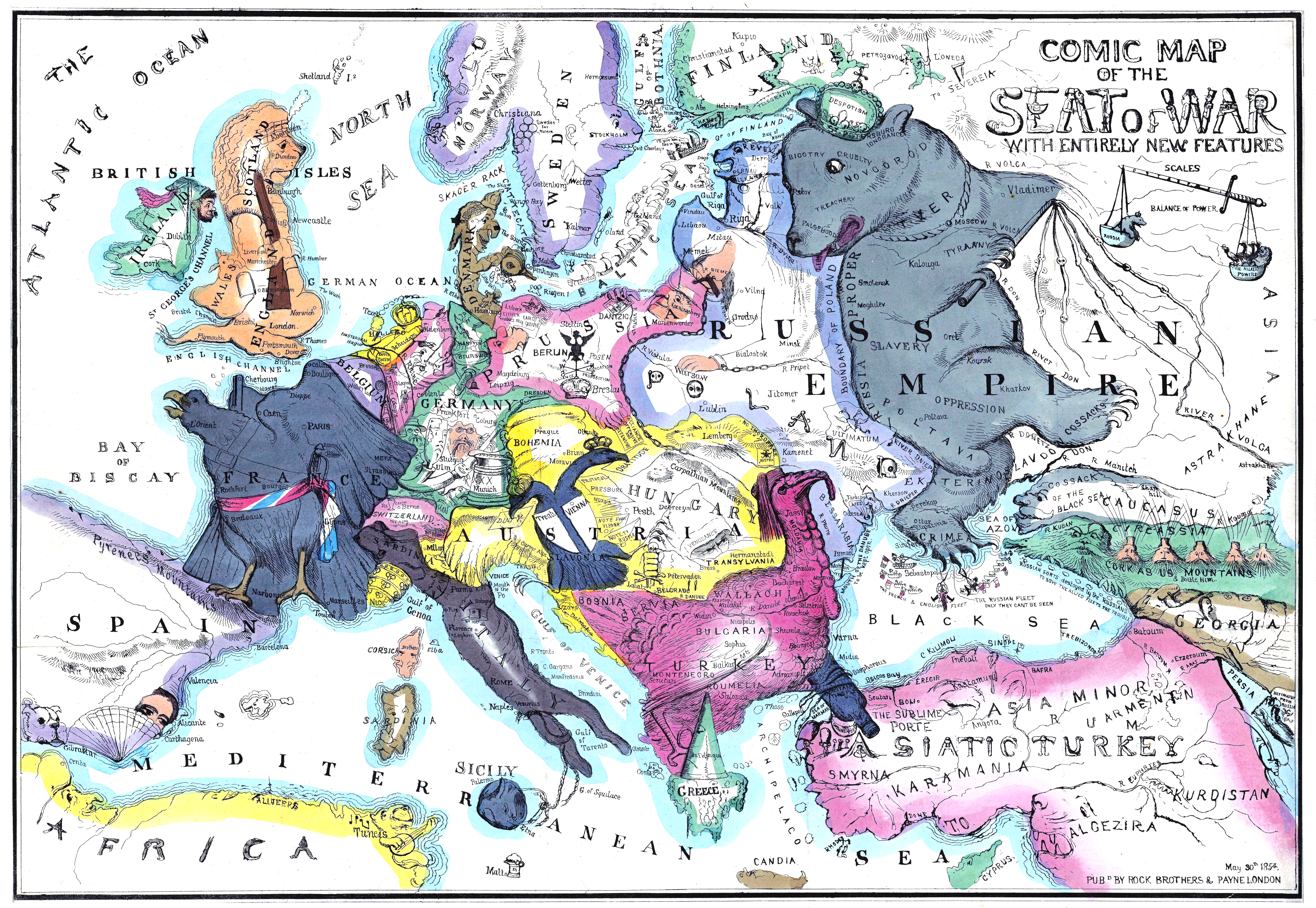
Comic Map of the Seat of War with Entirely New Features, a cartoon map by Onwhyn (1854). This map was translated into several other European languages.

Thomas was born in Clarkenwell where his father Joseph was a bookseller, printer, publisher, and newsagent on Catherine Street, Strand, while his mother Fanny was an accomplished artist who drew portraits of stage actors of the period although as an artist she was often credited as "Mr F. Onwhyn". The Lancet was in its early years published by Joseph Onwhyn. The date of birth of Thomas is unknown and the year of birth varies across sources with some giving it as 1813 or 1814 and there is no documented record other than his death certificate in which the age indicated would suggest that he was born in 1811. He was the oldest of several siblings. Thomas trained as an artist, illustrator and engraver and was active from 1836 to 1861. His younger brother Frederick died in a lunatic asylum at Stoke Newington on 31 May 1867 and some biographies confound this to state that Joseph "suffered a mental breakdown after taking on the publication of the satirical magazine The Owl".

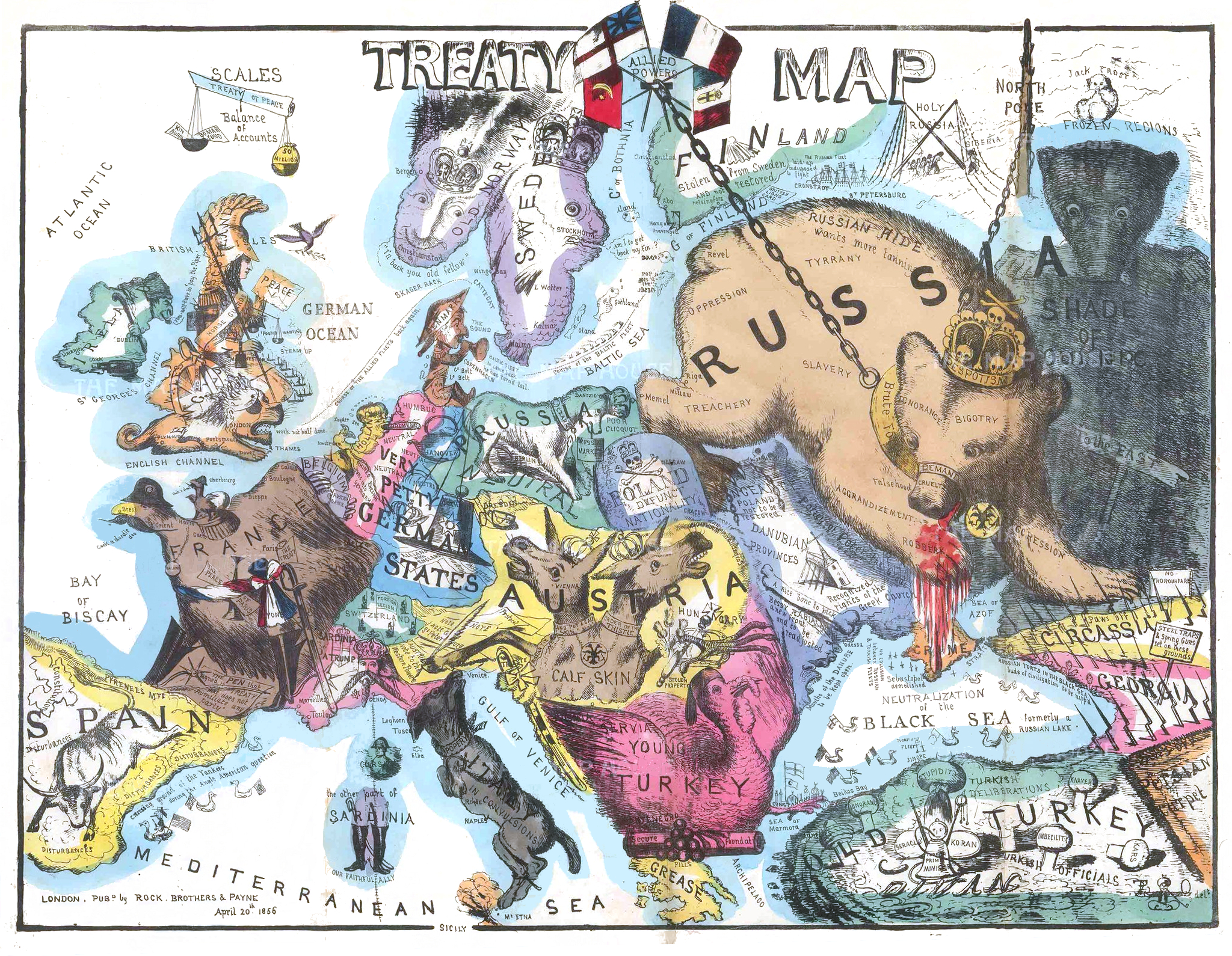
Treaty Map (1856)

Onwhyn contributed to a number of publications including The Age, Bell’s Life in London and Sporting Chronicle, The Penny Satirist, The Satirist, or, The Censor of the Times, and The English Gentleman. He also contributed to The Punch where some of his illustrations carry the initials O.T. or T.O.Onwhyn illustrated an edition of the Pickwick Papers under the pseudonym Samuel Weller. He also illustrated an edition from Grattan of Nicholas Nickleby (1839) which Dickens referred to in a letter of 13 July 1838 commenting on ‘the singular Vileness of the Illustrations’ (Letters of Charles Dickens, 1.414).

Onwhyn married Marian in 1866 and they had sons Thomas and Herbert.
