= Talking donkey =

A talking donkey is a type of talking animal; in this case, the animal is a donkey. Examples include:

== Characters ==
- Baba Looey, a character in the animated television series The Quick Draw McGraw Show
- Benjamin (Animal Farm), a character in the novel Animal Farm
- Candlewick (character), a character in the novel The Adventures of Pinocchio
- Donkey (Shrek), a character in the Shrek franchise
- Donkey Hodie, a character in the television series Mister Rogers' Neighborhood
- Eeyore, a character in the book series Winnie-the-Pooh
- Holly Dolly, a fictional singer
- Nick Bottom, a character in the play A Midsummer Night's Dream
- Puzzle (Narnia), a character in the novel series The Chronicles of Narnia
- Wise Donkey, a character in the book series Oz

== Legendary creatures ==
- Balaam's donkey, a donkey in the Bible
- Brag (folklore), a goblin in English folklore

== Works ==
- "An ass eating thistles", a fable in Aesop's Fables
- "The Ass and his Masters", a fable in Aesop's Fables
- "The Ass and the Pig", a fable in Aesop's Fables
- "The Ass Carrying an Image", a fable in Aesop's Fables
- "The Ass in the Lion's Skin", a fable in Aesop's Fables
- "The Donkey" (fairy tale), a fairy tale in Grimms' Fairy Tales
- "The Donkey's Head", a Jewish-Tunisian folktale
- The Golden Ass, a 2nd century novel by Apuleius
- "The Horse and the Donkey", a fable in Aesop's Fables
- "Der Kuckuck und der Esel", an 1835 song by August Heinrich Hoffmann and Carl Friedrich Zelter
- "The Lion Grown Old", a fable in Aesop's Fables
- Nestor, the Long-Eared Christmas Donkey, a 1977 Japanese-American animated film
- "The Old Man and the Ass", a fable in Aesop's Fables
- Sylvester and the Magic Pebble, a 1969 book by William Steig
- "Town Musicians of Bremen", a fairy tale in Grimms' Fairy Tales
- Trotro, a French animated television series
- "The Wishing-Table, the Gold-Ass, and the Cudgel in the Sack", a fairy tale in Grimms' Fairy Tales

== See also ==
- Cultural references to donkeys
- List of fictional ungulates
- Talking animals in fiction
