= La Fontaine's Fables =

Collection of fables by Jean de La Fontaine

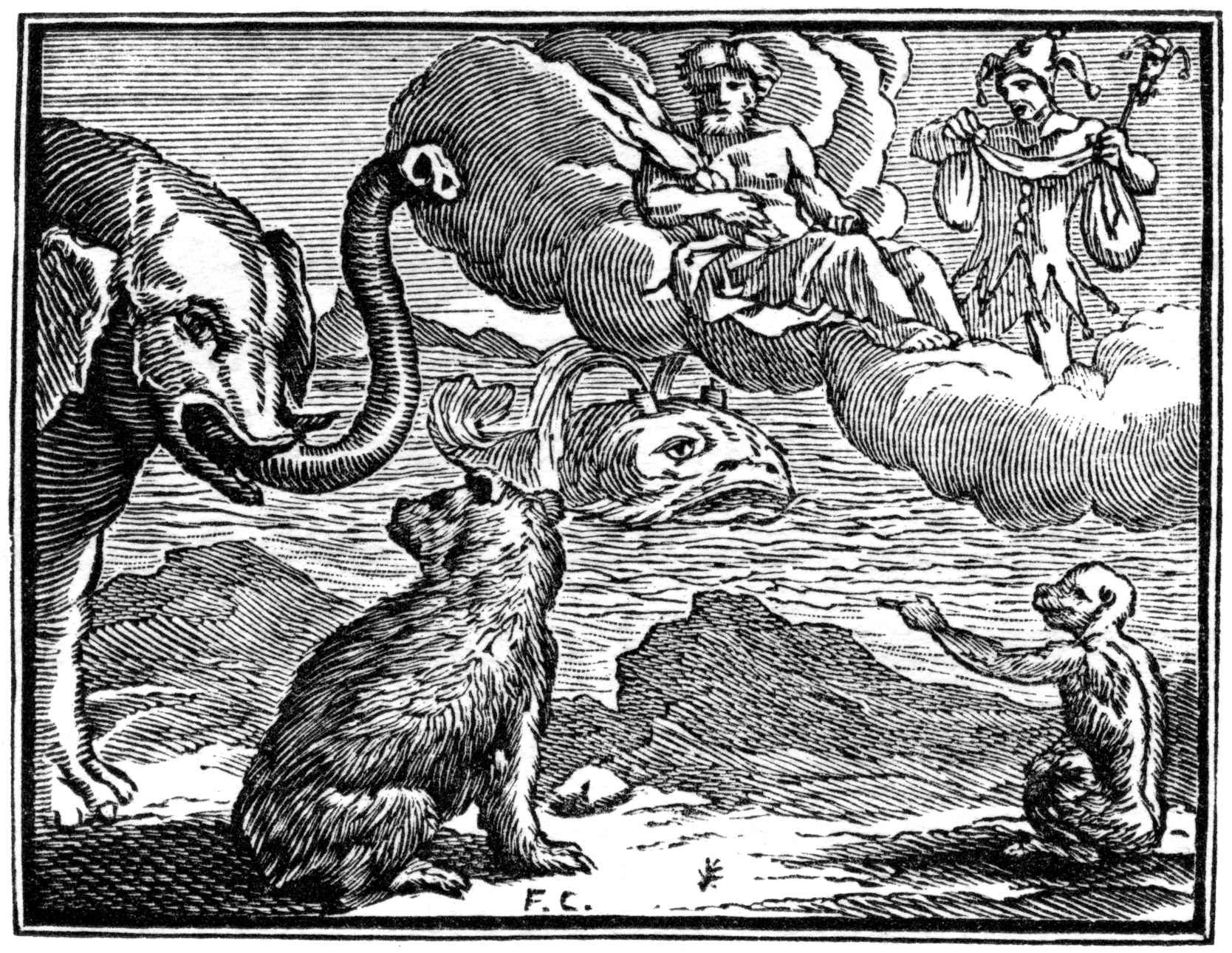
A picture by François Chauveau, illustrator of the original edition of the Fables

Jean de La Fontaine collected fables from a wide variety of sources, both Western and Eastern, and adapted them into French free verse. They were issued under the general title of Fables in several volumes from 1668 to 1694 and are considered classics of French literature. Humorous, nuanced and ironical, they were originally aimed at adults but then entered the educational system and were required learning for school children.

== Composition history ==
Divided into 12 books, there are 239 of the Fables, varying in length from a few lines to some hundred, those written later being as a rule longer than those written earlier.

The first collection of Fables Choisies had appeared March 31, 1668, dividing 124 fables into six books over its two volumes. They were dedicated to "Monseigneur" Louis, le Grand Dauphin, the six-year-old son of Louis XIV of France and his queen consort Maria Theresa of Spain. By this time, La Fontaine was 47 and known to readers chiefly as the author of Contes, lively stories in verse, grazing and sometimes transgressing the bounds of contemporary moral standards. The Fables, in contrast, were completely in compliance with these standards.

Eight new fables published in 1671 would eventually take their place in books 7–9 of the second collection. Books 7 and 8 appeared in 1678, while 9-11 appeared in 1679, the whole 87 fables being dedicated to the king's mistress, Madame de Montespan. Between 1682 and 1685 a few fables were published dealing with people in antiquity, such as "The Matron of Ephesus" and "Philemon and Baucis". Then book 12 appeared as a separate volume in 1694, containing 29 fables dedicated to the king's 12-year-old grandson, Louis, Duke of Burgundy.

== Plot sources ==
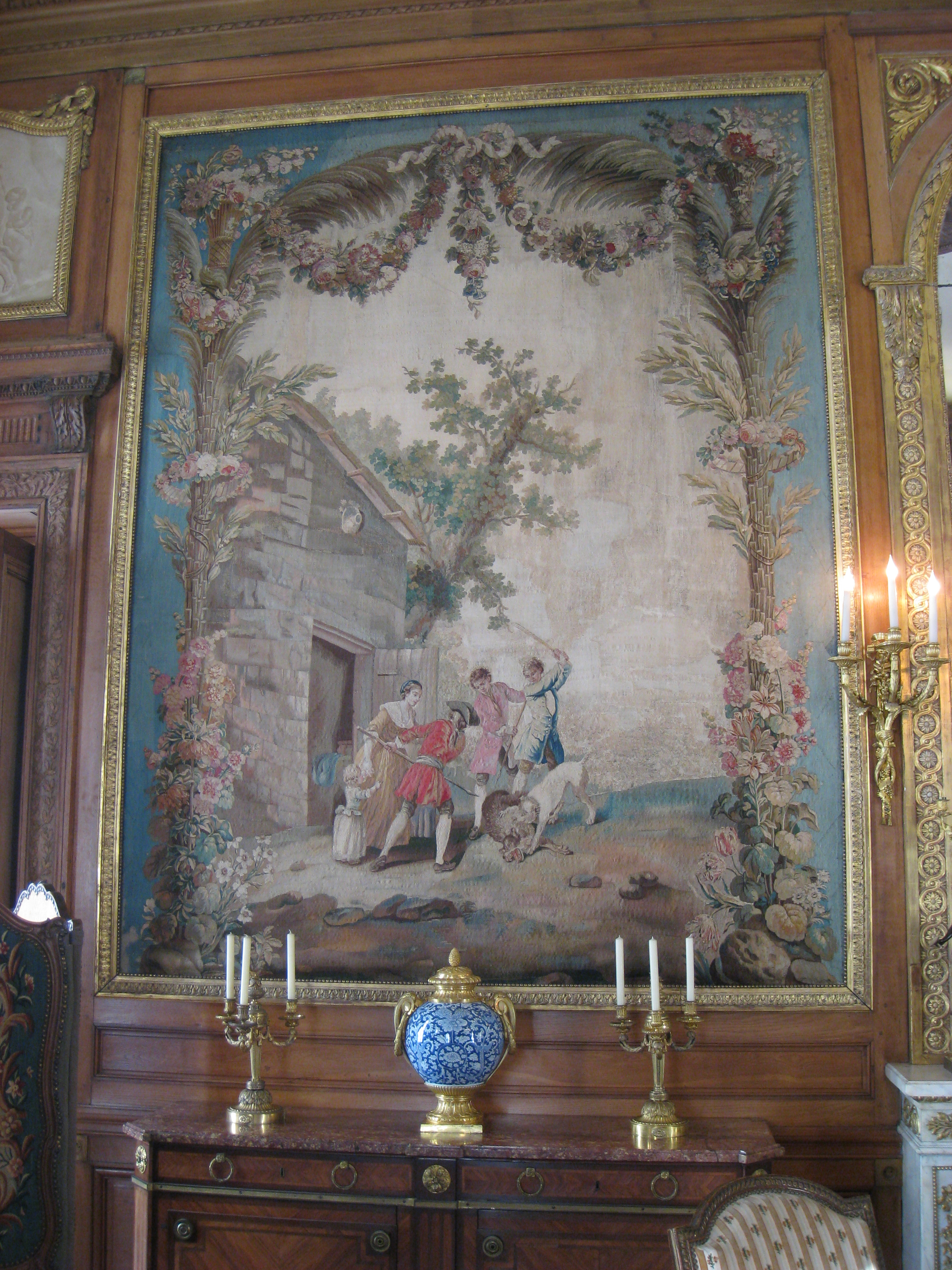
An Aubusson tapestry from the 18th century illustrating "The Lion in Love"

The first six books, collected in 1668, were in the main adapted from the classical fabulists Aesop, Babrius and Phaedrus. In these, La Fontaine adhered to the path of his predecessors with some closeness; but in the later collections he allowed himself far more liberty and in the later books there is a wider range of sources.

In the later books, the so-called Indian Bidpai is drawn upon for oriental fables that had come to the French through translations from Persian. The most likely source for La Fontaine was the pseudonymous version by Gilbert Gaulmin (1585–1665) under the title The book of Enlightenment or the Conduct of Kings (French: Le Livre des lumières ou la Conduite des Roys, composée par le sage Pilpay Indien, traduite en français par David Sahid, d’Ispahan, ville capitale de Perse; 1644). Another translation by Father Pierre Poussines appeared in 1666 with the Latin title Specimen sapientiae Indorum veterum (A sample of ancient Indian wisdom). With a genealogy going back to the Indian Panchatantra, they were then attributed to Bidpai (Pilpay), who is given more than his fair due by La Fontaine in the preface to his second collection of Fables: "I must acknowledge that I owe the greatest part to Pilpay, the Indian sage." (French: Je dirai par reconnaissance que j’en dois la plus grande partie à Pilpay sage indien.) His sources are in fact much more diverse and by no means mainly oriental; of 89 fables, no more than twenty are found in Bidpai's collection.

Avienus and Horace are also drawn upon in the later books along with the earlier French writers Rabelais, Clément Marot, Mathurin Régnier and Bonaventure des Périers. Boccaccio, Ariosto, Tasso and Machiavelli's comedies were also sources. Contemporary happenings, too, were occasionally turned to account, as for instance an accident at the funeral of M. de Boufflers (vii, II). No fable, so far as appears, is of La Fontaine's invention, and La Fontaine had many predecessors in the genre, especially in the beast fable.

== Content ==
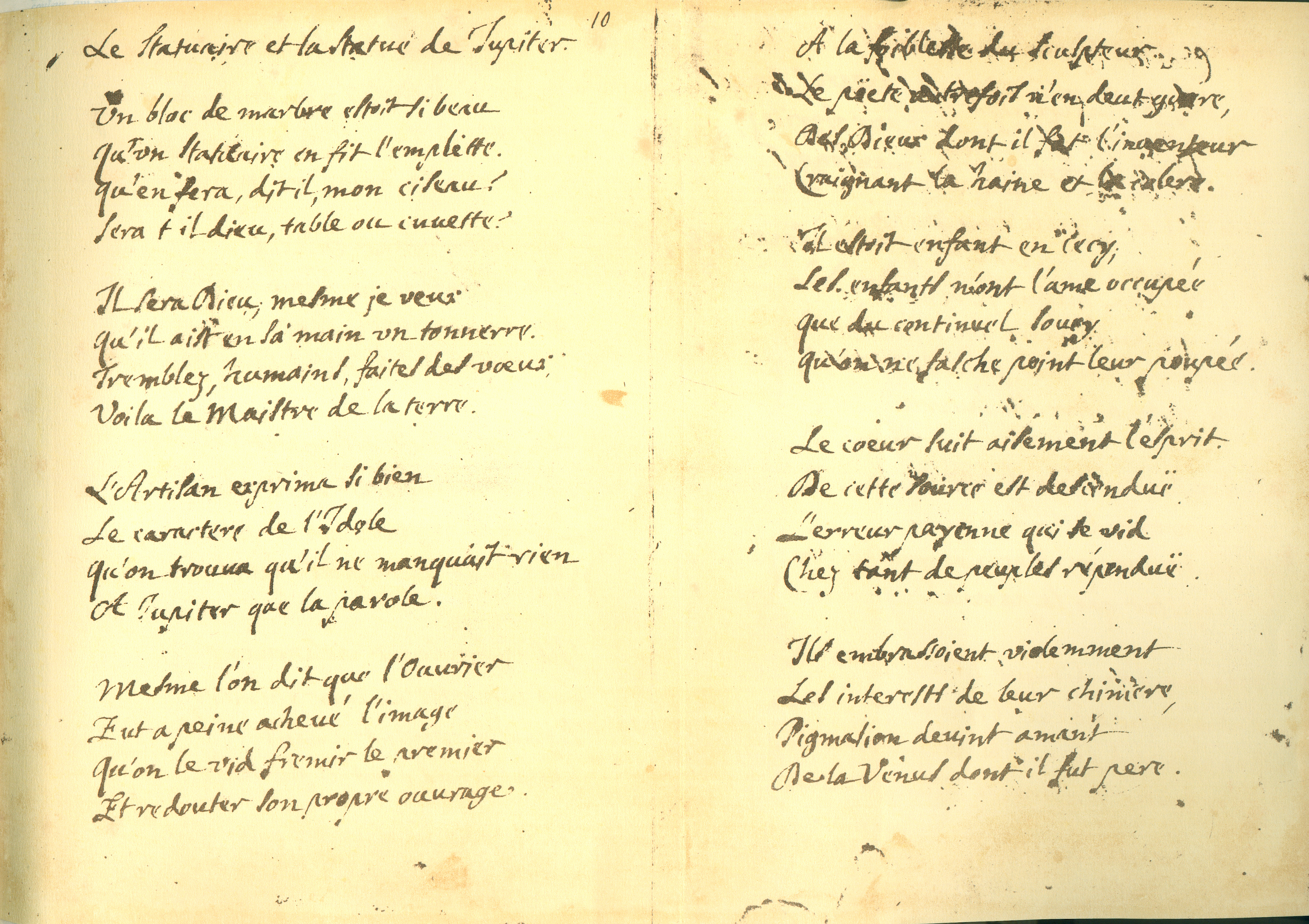
Facsimile of the manuscript of "The Sculptor and the Statue of Jupiter"

The subject of each of the Fables is often common property of many ages and ethnicities. What gives La Fontaine's Fables their rare distinction is the freshness in narration, the deftness of touch, the unconstrained suppleness of metrical structure, the unfailing humor of the pointed moral, the consummate art of their apparent artlessness. Keen insight into the foibles of human nature is found throughout, but in the later books ingenuity is employed to make the fable cover, yet convey, social doctrines and sympathies more democratic than the age would have tolerated in unmasked expression. Almost from the start, the Fables entered French literary consciousness to a greater degree than any other classic of its literature. For generations many of these little apologues have been read, committed to memory, recited, paraphrased, by every French school child. Countless phrases from them are current idioms, and familiarity with them is assumed.

"La Fontaine's Fables", wrote Madame de Sévigné, "are like a basket of strawberries. You begin by selecting the largest and best, but, little by little, you eat first one, then another, till at last the basket is empty". Silvestre de Sacy has commented that they supply delights to three different ages: the child rejoices in the freshness and vividness of the story, the eager student of literature in the consummate art with which it is told, the experienced man of the world in the subtle reflections on character and life which it conveys. Reception to the moral aspect has generally been positive, with exceptions such as Rousseau and Lamartine. The book has become a standard French reader both at home and abroad.

Lamartine, who preferred classic regularity in verse, could find in the Fables only "limping, disjointed, unequal verses, without symmetry either to the ear or on the page". But the poets of the Romantic School Hugo, Musset, Gautier and their fellows, found in the popular favor these verses had attained an incentive to undertake an emancipation of French prosody which they in large measure achieved.

== Reaching children ==
When he first wrote his Fables, La Fontaine had a sophisticated audience in mind. Nevertheless, the Fables were regarded as providing an excellent education in morals for children, and the first edition was dedicated to the six-year-old Dauphin. Following La Fontaine's example, his translator Charles Denis dedicated his Select Fables (1754) to the sixteen-year-old heir to the English throne. The 18th century was particularly distinguished for the number of fabulists in all languages and for the special cultivation of young people as a target audience. In the 1730s eight volumes of Nouvelles Poésies Spirituelles et Morales sur les plus beaux airs were published, the first six of which incorporated a section of fables aimed at children. These contained fables of La Fontaine rewritten to fit popular airs of the day and arranged for simple performance. The preface to this work announces that its aim is specifically to "give them an attraction to useful lessons which are suited to their age [and] an aversion to the profane songs which are often put into their mouths and which only serve to corrupt their innocence".

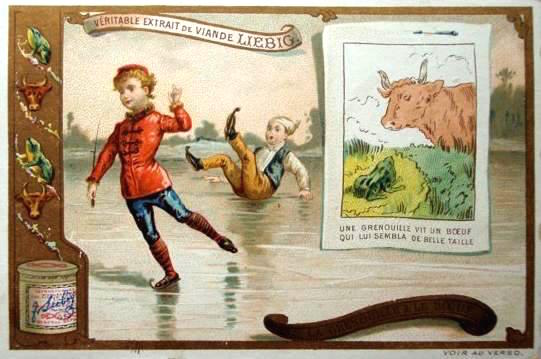
The practical lesson of "The frog that wanted to be as big as an ox" on a 19th-century trade card

This was in the context of getting the young people of the family to perform at social gatherings. Eventually the fables were learned by heart for such entertainments and afterwards they were adopted by the education system, not least as linguistic models as well. Reinforcing the work were illustrated editions, trade cards issued with chocolate and meat extract products, postcards with the picture on one side and the poem on the other, and illustrated chinaware. There have also been television series based on the fables. In Canada there was the 1958 Fables of La Fontaine series and in France Les Fables géométriques between 1989–91.

In England the bulk of children's writing concentrated on Aesop's fables rather than La Fontaine's adaptations. The boundary lines began to be blurred in compilations that mixed Aesop's fables with those from other sources. The middle section of "Modern Fables" in Robert Dodsley's Select Fables of Esop and other fabulists (1764) contains many from La Fontaine. These are in prose but Charles Denis' earlier collection was in verse and several authors writing poems specifically for children in the early 19th century also included versions of La Fontaine. Although there had been earlier complete translations in verse at the start of that century, the most popular was Elizur Wright's The Fables of La Fontaine, first published in Boston in 1841 with prints by Grandville. This went through several editions, both in the United States and in Britain. Other children's editions, in both prose and verse, were published in the 20th century.

== Individual fables ==
The following fables have individual articles devoted to them:

- The Acorn and the Pumpkin (Le gland et la citrouille, IX.4)
- The Animals Sick of the Plague (Les animaux malades de la peste, VII.1)
- The Ant and the Grasshopper (La cigale et la fourmi, I.1)
- The Ape and the Dolphin (Le singe et le dauphin, IV.7)
- The Ass and his Masters (L'âne et ses maîtres, VI.11)
- The Ass Carrying Relics (L'âne portant des reliques, V.14)
- The Ass in the Lion's Skin (L’âne vêtu de la peau du lion, V.21)
- The Astrologer who Fell into a Well (L'astrologue qui se laisse tomber dans un puits, II.13)
- The Bear and the Gardener (L'ours et l'amateur des jardins, VIII.10)
- The Bear and the Travelers (L’ours et les deux compagnons, V.20)
- The Belly and the Members (Les membres et l'estomac, III.2)
- The Bird Wounded by an Arrow (L'oiseau blessé d'une flèche, II.6)
- The Cat and the Mice (Le chat et un vieux rat, III.18)
- The Weasel and Aphrodite (La chatte métamorphosée en femme, II.18)
- The coach and the fly (Le coche et la mouche, VII.9)
- The Cobbler and the Financier (Le savetier et le financier, VIII.2)
- The Cock, the Dog and the Fox (Le coq et le renard, II.15)
- The Cock and the Jewel (Le coq et la perle, I.20)
- The Old Man and Death (La Mort et le bûcheron, I.16)
- The Dog and Its Reflection (Le chien qui lâche sa proie pour l'ombre, VI.17)
- The Dog and the Wolf (Le loup et le chien, I.5)
- The dog who carries his master’s dinner round his neck (Le chien qui porte à son cou le dîner de son maître, VIII.7)
- The Dove and the Ant (La colombe et la fourmi, II.12)
- The drowned woman and her husband (La femme noyée, III.16)
- The Eagle and the Beetle (L'Escarbot et l'aigle, II.8)
- The Two Pots (Le pot de terre et le pot de fer, V.2)
- The Farmer and his Sons, (Le laboureur et ses enfants, V.9)
- The Farmer and the Viper (Le villageois et le serpent, VI.13)
- The Fisherman and his Flute (Les poissons et le berger qui joue de la flûte, X.11)
- The fisherman and the little fish (Le petit poisson et le pêcheur, V.3)
- The Fly and the Ant (La mouche et la fourmi, IV.3)
- The Forest and the Woodcutter (La forêt et le bûcheron, X11.16)
- The Fox and the Mask (Le renard et le buste, IV.14)
- The Fox and the Crow (Le corbeau et le renard, I.2)
- The Fox and the Grapes (Le renard et les raisins, III.11)
- The Fox and the Sick Lion (Le lion malade et le renard, VI.14)
- The Fox, the Flies and the Hedgehog, (Le renard, les mouche et le hérisson, XII.13)
- The Frog and the Mouse (La grenouille et le rat, IV.11)
- The Frogs and the Sun (Le soleil et les grenouilles, VI.12, XII.24)
- The Fox and the Stork (Le renard et la cigogne, I.18)
- The Frog and the Ox (La grenouille qui veut se faire aussi grosse que le boeuf, I.3)
- The Frogs Who Desired a King (Les grenouilles qui demandent un roi, III.4)
- The Girl (La Fille, VII.5), see under The Heron and the Fish
- The Goose that Laid the Golden Eggs (La Poule aux oeufs d'or, V.13)
- The Hawk and the Nightingale (Le milan et le rossignol, IX.17)
- The Heron and the Fish, (Le Héron, VII.4)
- The Honest Woodcutter (Le bûcheron et Mercure, V.1)
- The Horse and the Donkey (Le cheval et l'âne, VI.16)
- The Horse that Lost its Liberty (Le cheval s'étant voulu venger du cerf, IV.13)
- The Bird in Borrowed Feathers (Le geai paré des plumes du paon, IV.9)
- The Lion, the Bear and the Fox (Les voleurs et l’âne, I.13)
- The Lion and the Mouse (Le lion et le rat, II.11)
- The Lion Grown Old, (Le lion devenu vieux, III.14)
- The Lion in Love (Le lion amoureux, IV.1)
- The Lion's Share (La génisse, la chèvre et le brebis en société avec le lion, I.6)
- The Man and the Lion (Le lion abattu par l'homme, III.10)
- The man and the wooden idol (L'homme et l'idole de bois, IV.8)
- The Man who Runs after Fortune (L'homme qui court après la fortune et l'homme qui l'attend dans son lit, VII.12)
- The Man with two Mistresses (L'homme entre deux âges et ses deux maîtresses, I.17)
- The Mice in Council (Conseil tenu par les rats, II.2)
- The Milkmaid and Her Pail (La laitière et le pot au lait, VII.10)
- The miller, his son and the donkey (Le meunier, son fils, et l’âne, III.1)
- The Miser and his Gold (L'avare qui a perdu son trésor, IV.20)
- The Monkey and the Cat (Le singe et le chat, IX.17)
- The Mountain in Labour (La montagne qui accouche, V.10)
- The Mouse and the Oyster (Le rat et l'huître, VIII.9)
- The Mouse Turned into a Maid (La souris métamorphosée en fille, IX.7)
- The Oak and the Reed (Le chêne et le roseau, I.22)
- The Old Cat and the Young Mouse (Le vieux chat et la jeune souris, XII.5)
- The Old Man and his Sons (Le vieillard et ses fils, IV.18)
- The Old Man and the Ass (Le vieillard et l'âne, VI.8)
- The North Wind and the Sun (Phébus et Borée, VI.3)
- The Shepherd and the Sea (Le Berger et la Mer, IV.2)
- Still Waters Run Deep (Le torrent et la rivière, VIII.23)
- The Stag and the Vine (Le cerf et la vigne, V.15)
- The Swan and the Goose (Le cygne et le cuisinier, III.12)
- The Tortoise and the Birds (La tortue et les deux canards, X.3)
- The Tortoise and the Hare (Le lièvre et la tortue, VI.10)
- The Town Mouse and the Country Mouse (Le rat de ville et le rat des champs, I.9)
- The Miser and his Gold (Le trésor et les deux hommes, IX.15)
- The Two Pigeons (Les deux pigeons, IX.2)
- The Vultures and the Pigeons (Les vautours et les pigeons, VII.8)
- The Fox and the Weasel (La belette entrée dans un grenier, III.17)
- The Wagoner Mired (Le charretier embourbé, VI.18)
- The Wolf and the Crane (Le loup et la cigogne, III.9)
- The Wolf and the Lamb (Le loup et l’agneau, I.10)
- The Wolf and the Shepherds (Le loup et les bergers, X.5)
- The Wolf in Sheep's Clothing (Le loup devenu berger, III.3)
- The Women and the Secret (Les femmes et le secret, VIII.6)
- The Young Widow (La jeune veuve, VI.21)
