= The Fly and the Ant =

Aesop's Fable

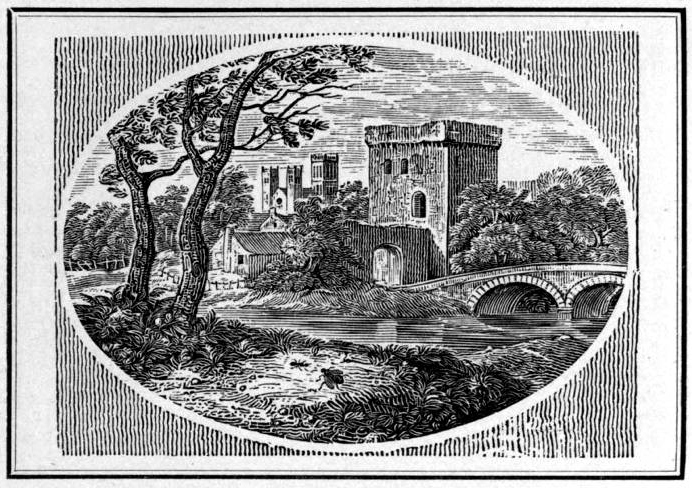
Thomas Bewick's woodcut illustrating the fable, 1818

The Fly and the Ant is one of Aesop's Fables that appears in the form of a debate between the two insects. It is numbered 521 in the Perry Index.

== A question of precedence ==
In the fable as recounted by Phaedrus, the fly claims precedence since it tastes sacrifices even before the gods, and in the human sphere perches on crowned heads and makes free with any woman. The ant argues that taking liberties without a prior invitation proves nothing. Working for the common good is the true measure of worth, not vainglory, and winter will be the final arbiter. On account of the ant's boast of its industry and anticipation of winter, it has been argued that their debate is a derivative of the fable of the ant and the grasshopper.

In some retellings, it is the ant's reply that the fly perches on dung equally with places of prominence that is stressed. This is so in Odo of Cheriton's ecclesiastical interpretation, in Roger L'Estrange's racy version and William Somervile's clash between a courtier and his country cousin. William Caxton used the story to censure those who praise themselves, while pride is the target of the neo-Latin poem based on the fable by Hieronymus Osius. In La Fontaine's Fables the ant's provident industry is highlighted, as it is in the contemporary collection illustrated by Francis Barlow as well as in the prose reflections of Samuel Croxall and Thomas Bewick. In Ivan Krylov's variant "The Fly and the Bee", the bee tries to point out that the fly is despised and constantly driven out, to which the fly replies it cares not, since it can always fly back in.
