= The Dog and the Wolf =

Aesop's fable

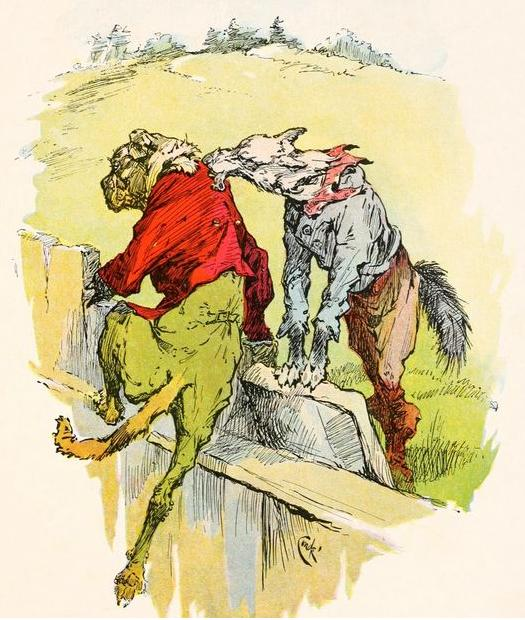
An illustration of the fable by J.M.Condé, 1905

The Dog and the Wolf is one of Aesop's Fables, numbered 346 in the Perry Index. It has been popular since antiquity as an object lesson of how freedom should not be exchanged for comfort or financial gain. An alternative fable with the same moral concerning different animals is less well known.

== Freedom is sweet ==
A famished wolf meets a well-fed dog and compliments him on his sleek appearance. The dog describes his life of ease and invites the wolf to join him. As they go on their way, the wolf asks why the fur about the dog's neck is worn away. He replies that it is merely caused by the collar he has to wear at home. The wolf then leaves him, declaring that a full belly is poor compensation for lack of liberty.

That the fable dates from before Aesop's time is suggested by a single line surviving from a poem by Archilochos in which the question is asked 'what has caused the scruff of his neck to become so worn'. It is conjectured that this refers to some early version of the fable, which is well attested in later Greek sources, including the collection of Babrius, as well as in the Latin collection of Phaedrus. The fable was also well known in the Middle Ages, was included in William Caxton's collection, and was made the subject of a Neo-Latin poem by Hieronymus Osius. In William Somervile's retelling, the moral is lengthened into a panegyric of Britain's sturdy independence. The "application" in Thomas Bewick's The Fables of Aesop (1818), however, observes more cautiously that "liberty in a state of society does not consist in doing whatsoever we please" and therefore "a certain portion of individual liberty must be given up for the good of the whole".

The story was also made the subject of one of La Fontaine's Fables (Le loup et le chien, I.5), in which Master Wolf, on learning the forfeit necessary, "took to its heels and is running yet". In modern times the text has been set for piano and high voice by the French composer Isabelle Aboulker.

== The wild animal and the beast of burden ==
A fragmentary proverbial saying attributed to Ahiqar occurs in an Aramaic document dating from the 6th century BCE: A man one day said to the onager (wild ass), "Let me ride upon thee, and I will maintain thee ..." Said the wild ass, "Keep thy maintenance and thy fodder and let me not see thy riding." Since the onager is an Asian animal, it suggests that this region may have been the origin of the alternative fable recorded as 183 in the Perry Index. In this the wild ass at first congratulates a grazing pack-animal's sleek condition but eventually is grateful for his own freedom after seeing the other being driven along beneath a load. A later 'Christianised' version is now numbered as the independent fable 411 in the Perry Index. There the onager jeers at a donkey, only to be eaten by a lion since it is not guarded by a human.
