= The Lion in Love (fable) =

Aesop's fable

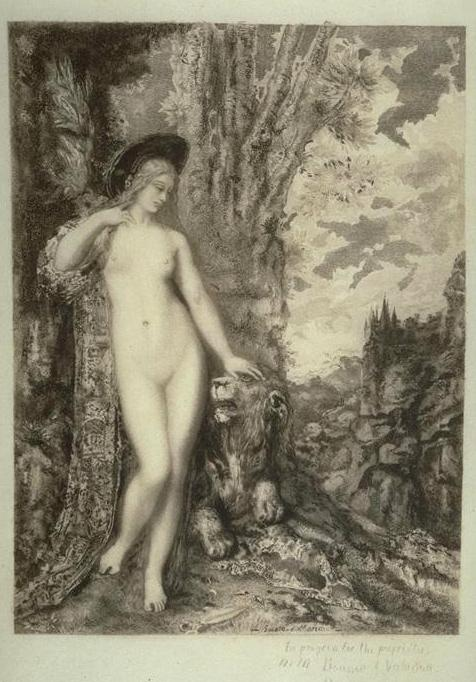
An etching by Félix Bracquemond after Gustave Moreau, 1886

The Lion in Love is a cautionary tale of Greek origin which was counted among Aesop's Fables and is numbered 140 in the Perry Index. Its present title is a translation of the one given by Jean de la Fontaine after he retold it in his fables. Since then it has been treated frequently by artists. It has also acquired idiomatic force and as such has been used as the title of several literary works.

== The fable and its interpretation ==
A lion falls in love with a peasant's daughter and asks the father's permission to marry her. Unwilling to refuse outright, the man sets the condition that the animal should first have its claws clipped and its teeth filed. When the lion complies, the man clubs it to death, or in milder accounts simply drives it away, since it now can no longer defend itself.

Though the story was included in early collections of Aesop's fables, including those of Babrius and Aphthonius of Antioch, its earliest relation is as part of a war leader's speech in the 1st century BCE Bibliotheca historica of Diodorus Siculus, where it is described without ascription as an "old story". Significantly, the fable is interpreted there as a warning against ever letting down one's guard where an enemy is concerned and Aphthonius too comments that "If you follow the advice of your enemies, you will run into danger".

By the time the fable reappeared in Europe after the Renaissance it was being reinterpreted as a caution against being led astray by passion. The Neo-Latin poem Leo procus of Hieronymus Osius ends with the reflection "By love the cleverest, sometimes, / are led astray, the strongest tamed". A century later, Francis Barlow's illustration of what he titles Leo Amatorius is summed up in the couplet "Love asailes with powerfull charmes, / and both our Prudence and our strength disarmes". La Fontaine titled his poem Le lion amoureux and ended with the sentiment "O love, O love, mastered by you, / prudence we well may bid adieu" (IV.1).

One of the factors influencing this interpretation was the development of the Renaissance emblem associated with the Latin sentiment Amor vincit omnia (Love conquers all). In a medal struck in 1444, Pisanello pictures a lion fawning on winged Cupid. This was reprised in the Emblemata amatoria (1607/8) of Daniël Heinsius as a Cupid astride a rampant lion, accompanied in one edition by a poem in French in which Love boasts that "the lion is conquered by my taming arrow". The interpretation is that even the fiercest nature can be tamed by love, but the reference to a lion inevitably brings to mind the well known instance of his fatal subjection to love in the fable. In illustrations during the following centuries, the lion fawns on his lady love in the same attitude as in Pisanello's medal, as for instance on the plate from the La Fontaine series of Keller & Guerin at the Luneville potteries.

== The fable in the arts ==
Illustrations of the fable were rare before the 19th century. In the 18th, it was the subject of an Aubusson tapestry to a design of Jean-Baptiste Oudry, and in England it was painted during the 1790s by James Northcote.

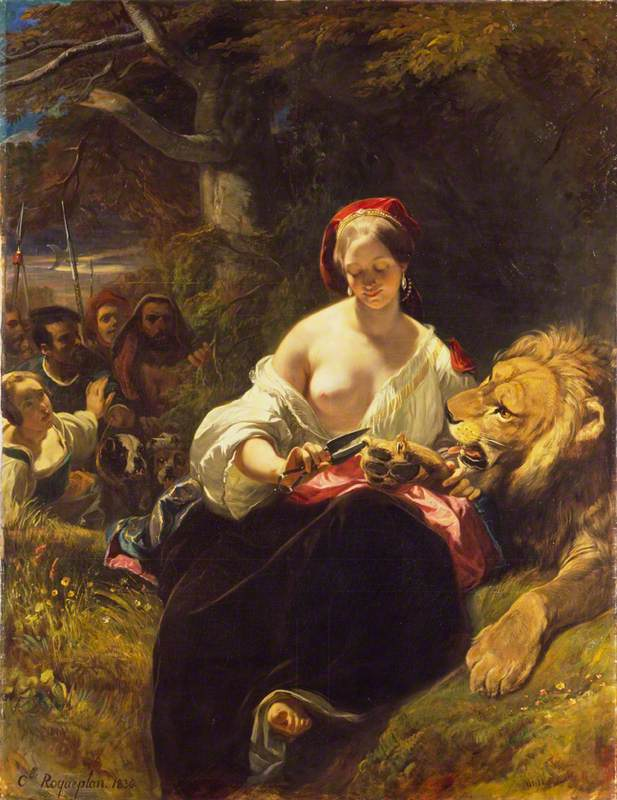
Camille Roqueplan's dark interpretation of the fable in the Wallace Collection

It was not until the 19th century that artists confronted the questionable morality of the human actors in the fable and treated the woman as more than a passive bystander. The change in attitude is evident in Camille Roqueplan's painting of 1836 which makes the lion's love-object the one who clips its claws (see left), a detail absent from the text. Its iconography is reminiscent of the story of Delilah's betrayal of Samson and especially those paintings in which Samson's head rests on her lap while she crops his hair and attackers lurk in the background. Another treatment of the theme is the 1851 statue by Guillaume Geefs in the Royal Museums of Fine Arts of Belgium, although in this case the lady is sitting on the lion's back as she works with her scissors.

The subject also lends itself to satirical interpretation and was chosen for this purpose by the Japanese caricaturist Kawanabe Kyōsai for his Isoho Monogotari series (1870–80). More recently Diane Victor has used it in her lithograph "The lion who loved the lady" (2011) to comment on the relationship between China and Africa. In other depictions too, as in paintings by Gustave Moreau, Adolphe Weisz (1838 – after 1900) and Henri Courcelles-Dumont (1856–1918), the woman flaunts her naked body in a show of power over the beast.

There were other sculptural treatments of the fable, including the statue by Hippolyte Maindron in the Parc de Blossac, Poitiers, erected in 1883, although the original plaster model was shown at the 1869 Salon. Smaller replicas of Geefs' statue were made for sale after it appeared at The Great Exhibition and the Exposition Universelle (1855), and in 1885 Mintons issued a similar Parian ware figure of its own. Spode had already used an illustration of the fable on its Aesop series of table china, dating from 1830, and from 1900 the Zanesville Tile Company reproduced the Walter Crane illustration from Baby's Own Aesop (1887) on its product.

In the world of music, the fable was twice made the subject of a ballet under its French title. Karol Rathaus' version (Op. 42b) was first performed by the Ballet Russe in 1937 and in 1942 Francis Poulenc made it an episode in his ballet suite Les Animaux modèles (FP 111). It is also one of the 'short operas' in Ned Rorem's Fables (1971).

== Idioms ==
The title of the fable, both in English and French, was eventually to have an almost idiomatic force in reference to the pacification by love of the dominant male nature. As such it was given to two paintings which showed a soldier helping a young woman with her needlework. Abraham Solomon's, exhibited at the Royal Academy summer exhibition of 1858, depicted a grey-haired warrior in uniform trying to thread the needle of a lady seated beside him on a sofa, while the one by Emile Pierre Metzmacher (1815–1905), exhibited at the Exposition Universelle (1889), was a period piece in which a younger soldier tries his hand at tapestry.

In literature the title was used for depiction of the emotional relationships of social lions. The novella by Frédéric Soulié (1839) is a comedy of manners that depicts the unequal love of a well-born dandy and its tragic outcome. Eugène Scribe's contemporary light-hearted comedy of 1840 is set in England, where a lord falls in love with his servant and, after attempting seduction and force, agrees to marry her. The verse drama by François Ponsard, first staged in 1866, was set in 1796, in the period following the Reign of Terror in France. A hero of the armies of the Revolution falls in love with a Royalist aristocrat whose father is plotting against the Republic and there is a struggle between duty and love on both sides. Its subtle dynamics encompass far more than 'trimming the hero's claws and filing his teeth', as a contemporary reviewer noted. Later examples of the title's use in English include the play by Shelagh Delaney (1960), about the marriage between a frustrated man and an aggressive woman, and a romance by Elizabeth Lapthorne (2004).

The method for pacifying the lion also gave rise in the 19th century to the allied English idioms of 'to draw someone's teeth' and 'to cut, clip or pare someone's claws'. Their association with the fable is demonstrated by both being used together in a news report of 1831. Both have the meaning of rendering someone harmless.
