= The Old Man and the Ass =

Aesop's fable

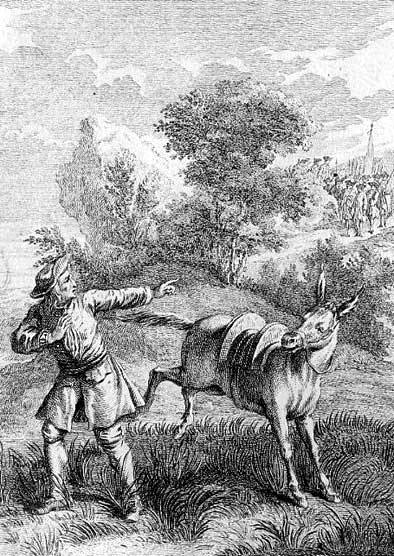
Jean-Baptiste Oudry's illustration of La Fontaine's fable

The Old Man and the Ass began as a fable with a political theme. Appearing among Aesop's Fables, it is numbered 476 in the Perry Index.

== Variations and interpretations ==
The fable as recorded by Phaedrus concerns an old man who tells his ass to fly with him on the approach of an army. The ass asks if they are liable to double his load and on being assured not, replies that, since his lot is to be a beast of burden, he is indifferent who is his owner. Phaedrus comments on the story that "When there is a change in government, nothing changes for the poor folk except their master's name." Much the same conclusion is drawn in Hieronymus Osius's Neo-Latin poem, Asinus et vitulus (the ass and the herdboy).

The story later appeared in La Fontaine's Fables as Le vieillard et l'âne (VI.8). Here the ass has been turned into a meadow and prefers to continue grazing rather than flee. Its conclusion is that, whoever is owner, "Our master is our enemy" (Notre ennemi, c'est notre maître). This was translated into English by Charles Dennis in his Select Fables (1754) and later by John Matthews, where he likened the situation to partitioned Poland.

Laurentius Abstemius wrote a variant fable that appeared in his Hecatomythium (1490). There it is a calf and an ass who discuss what to do in face of an advancing army. The calf is advised to run away since its life would be at stake, but in the ass' case "servants need not fear a change in masters, so long as they are no worse than the previous one". This seems to reference as well the changes for the worse in the story of The Ass and his Masters.
