= The Shepherd and the Sea =

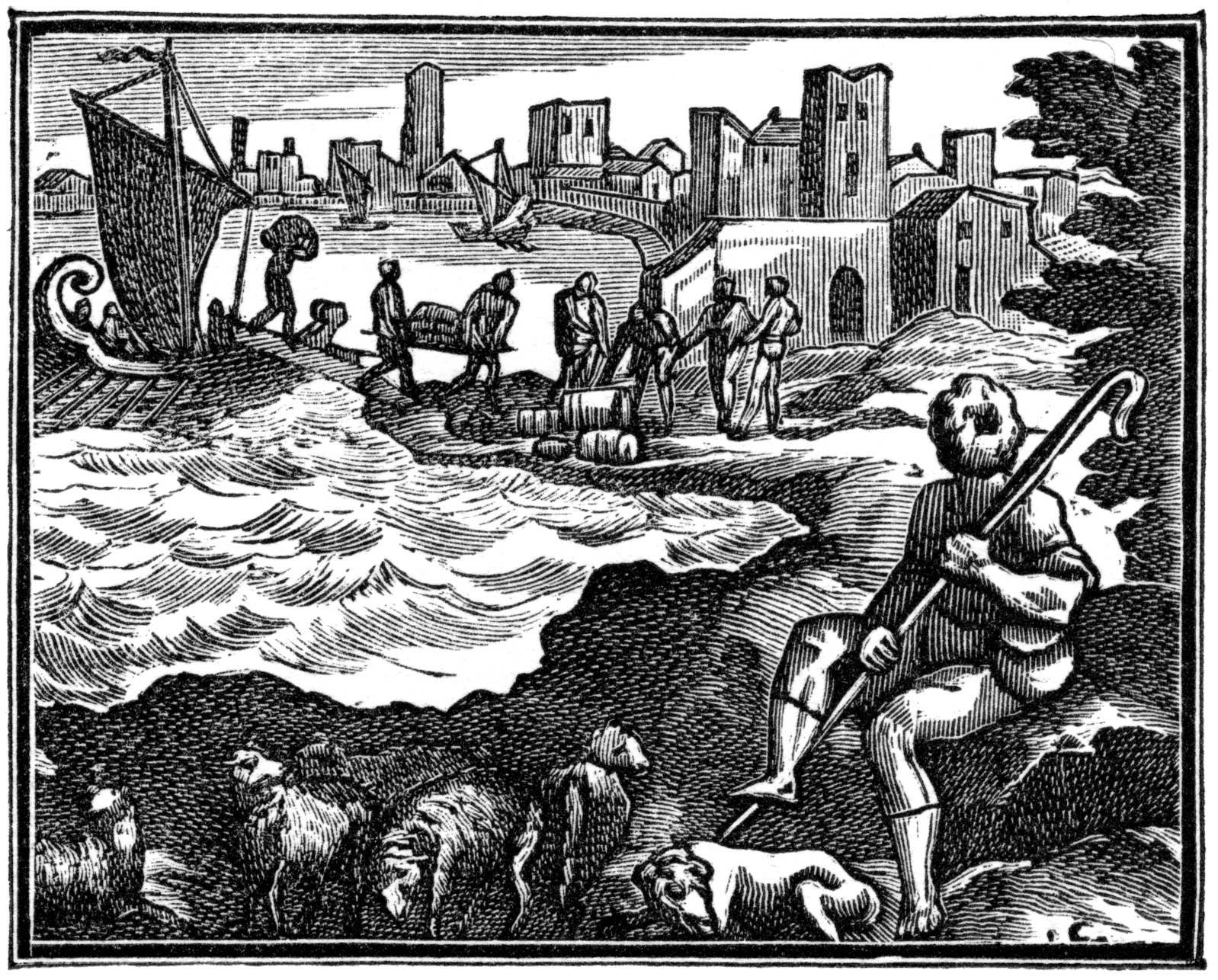
Woodcut by François Chauveau from an early edition of the Fables mises en vers par M. de la Fontaine

The Shepherd and the Sea, alternatively known as The Sicilian and the Sea and The Shepherd Turned Merchant, is a fable of Greek origin ascribed to Aesop and is numbered 207 in the Perry Index. It is a tale of unhappy experience frequently told to illustrate proverbial wisdom.

== Proverbial wisdom ==
A shepherd lives contentedly with his small, secure possessions until the sight of freighted ships on the sea tempts him to sell his flock and take up trading. The cargo is lost in a shipwreck, or in some accounts is thrown overboard to lighten the ship during a storm, and on his return he must herd another's flock until he can afford one of his own again. The fable's moral is to be satisfied with one's station in life and not to speculate on an uncertain future.

The Greek version of the fable was still known in the 15th century and was illustrated by a two-part coloured illumination in the Medici Manuscript. In the version preserved by Babrius there was a variation which had become proverbial. What the shepherd turned merchant had wanted to trade in was dates. On shore once more and coming across someone admiring the calm sea, he blurted out that the real reason for its quiescence was its desire for more dates – or figs in other versions. In his Adagia, Erasmus glosses the expression Siculus mare (Σικελὸς θάλασσαν) as deriving from a similar story told of a Sicilian trader.

The fable was versified as Le Berger et la Mer by Jean de La Fontaine in his first collection of fables (IV.2), published in 1668. In this he devotes twenty rhyming lines to the narration of the story and a further eleven to drawing out the moral in the plain speech of proverbial lore. In the course of this La Fontaine counsels that Un sou, quand il est assuré, vaut mieux que cinq en espérance: a small coin in your grasp is better worth than five in future. Much the same thing reappears at the close of his The Fisherman and the Little Fish: Un tiens vaut mieux que deux tu l'auras (One 'here you are' is better than two 'you shall haves').

There is an echo here too of the landsman's scepticism of the maritime trader that goes back to the dramatist Menander: that it is sufficient to live poor on land rather than wealthy at sea (satius est pauperem in terra vivere quam divitem navigare). Therefore we should beware of extravagant hopes since, La Fontaine continues with equal idiomatic scepticism, la mer promet des monts et merveilles (the sea promises mountains and marvels) but the plundering wind is on its way.

== Versions in English ==
In English there were prose narrations in the fable collections of Roger L'Estrange (1692), Samuel Croxall (1722) and Thomas Bewick (1818). In each of these the fable was titled "The Shepherd Turned Merchant" and was accompanied by a lengthy commentary. For L'Estrange, happiness comes from contentment with one's condition; for Croxall it is wise to bear this in mind, but from the experience of disappointment "Bought wit is best" – a variation on the proverbial "wit once bought, is worth twice taught." For Bewick, however, such "experience will convince them when it is too late", which is the burden of other Classical proverbs. Brooke Boothby tells the same story pithily in verse, in his fable collection of 1809, in order to illustrate his opening proposition,

Fair-weather sailors, keep at home,
For be assur'd the storm will come.

Another English poetic version was given the new title "The Shepherd and the Calm" by Anne Finch, Countess of Winchilsea when it appeared in her Poems on several Occasions (1713). In this she follows La Fontaine in placing the fable in the tradition of pastoral poetry. Where the French poet refers to his shepherd as a type of "Coridon or Tirsis", characters in Virgil's Eclogue 7,, Anne Finch's Corydon is the herdsman of Idyll IV of Theocritus and the suitor of Phyllis, with whom his name is coupled in such earlier English poems as Nicholas Breton's "A Pastoral Of Phyllis And Corydon" and another by Sir Charles Sedley, 5th Baronet.. At the end of the poem the "Shepherd-swain" prefers certainty "in the obscurest Vale" to the false promise of the sea.

In the following century, George Fyler Townsend preferred the title "The Shepherd and the Sea" for his translation of Aesop.

== Artistic heritage ==
Most illustrations from books from the 16th century onwards picture the shepherd surrounded by his flock and looking out to sea from a headland. There were two 19th-century paintings of the subject by French artists. Lancelot-Théodore Turpin de Crissé's Le Berger et la Mer (1827) shows the naked herder of ancient times, seated on a rock and playing a pipe while his flock scrambles about the seaside cliffs. In Constant Troyon's 1840 painting of the subject, the shepherd has his back to his foraging animals as he crosses a wind-blown headland. Other well-known artists depicted the fable as part of a series dedicated to those of La Fontaine. They include Gustave Moreau's 1881 watercolour and Marc Chagall's coloured etching of 1952.

Two artistic interpretations of the fable take their start from La Fontaine's line that originally the shepherd was content to be "un voisin d'Amphitrite", a neighbour of the sea goddess, and thus a dweller on the seashore. In summing up the story in the second half of the poem, La Fontaine warns that we should "close our ears to the plea/ of ambition and the sea." Taking a lead from this, the caricaturist Grandville pictured the now wary shepherd rejecting the renewed appeal of a mermaid and turning his back on a prospect of ships under sail (see the Gallery). Later on, in 1900, the Symbolist painter fr:Victor Brugairolles pictured the shepherd as a supplicant on the shore, kneeling with hands raised before the naked goddess.

There was also a setting for voice and piano by Jacques Offenbach in which Le Berger et la Mer appeared as the first of his Six Fables de La Fontaine (1842).

== Gallery ==
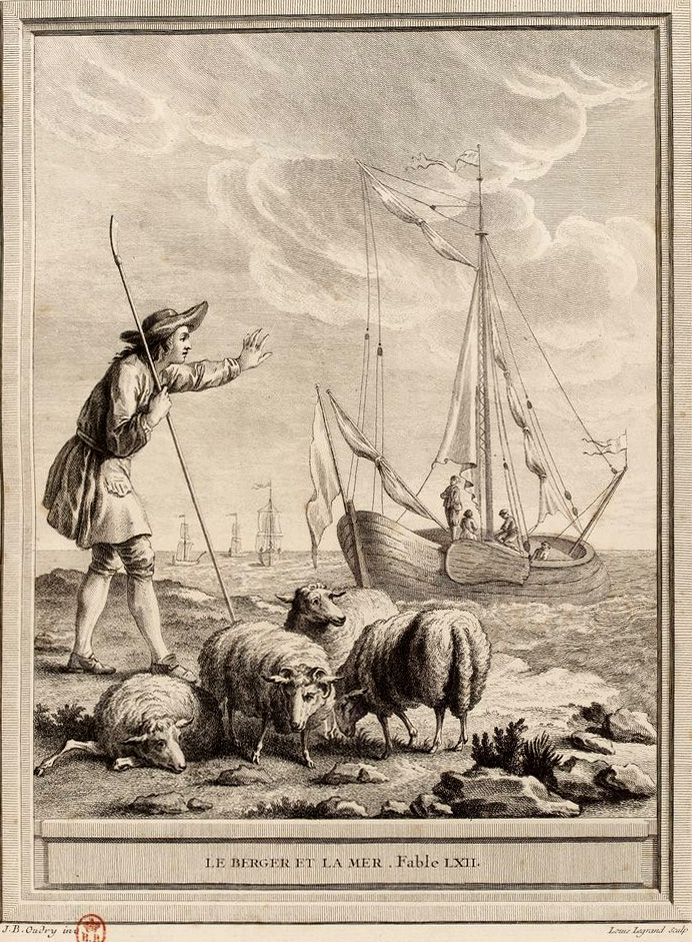
Woodcut after the design of Jean-Baptiste Oudry, 1775-9

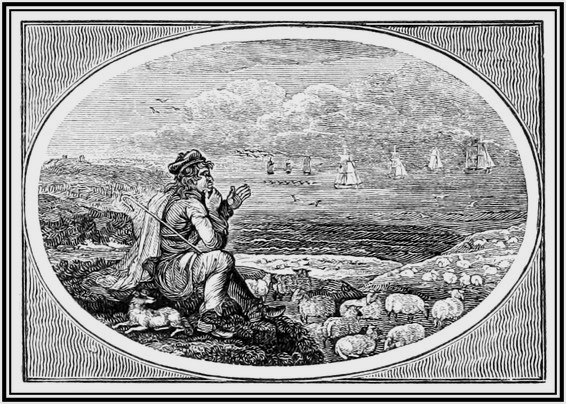
Woodcut frontispiece by Thomas Bewick from The Fables of Aesop (Newcastle, 1818)

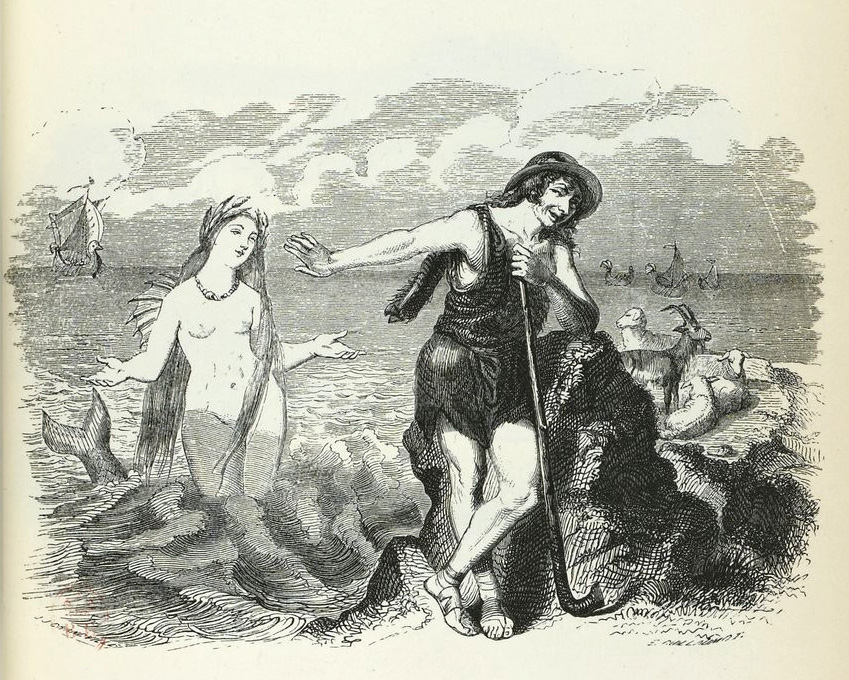
Grandville's drawing of the shepherd rejecting the sea goddess (c. 1838-40)

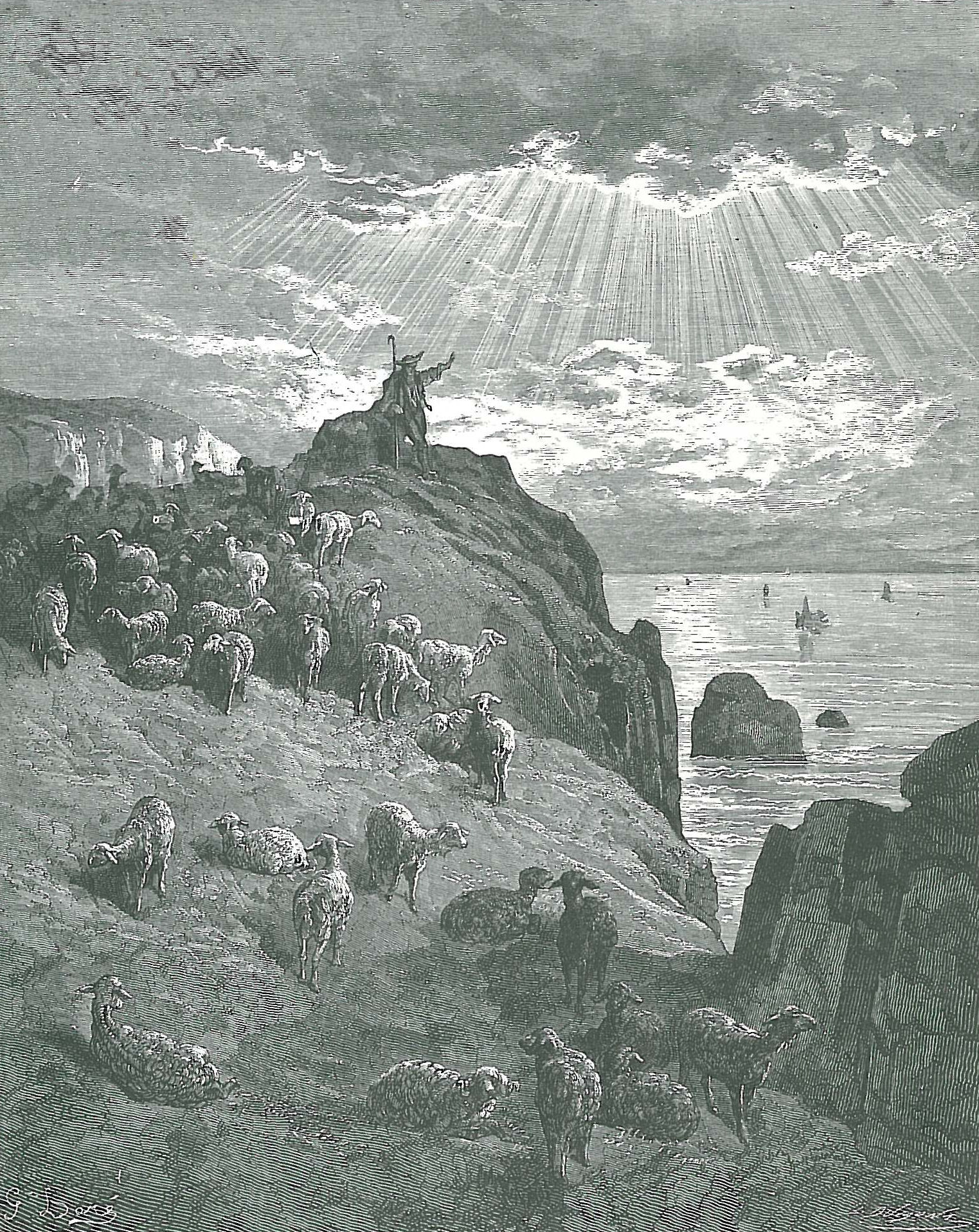
Woodcut by Gustave Doré, 1867

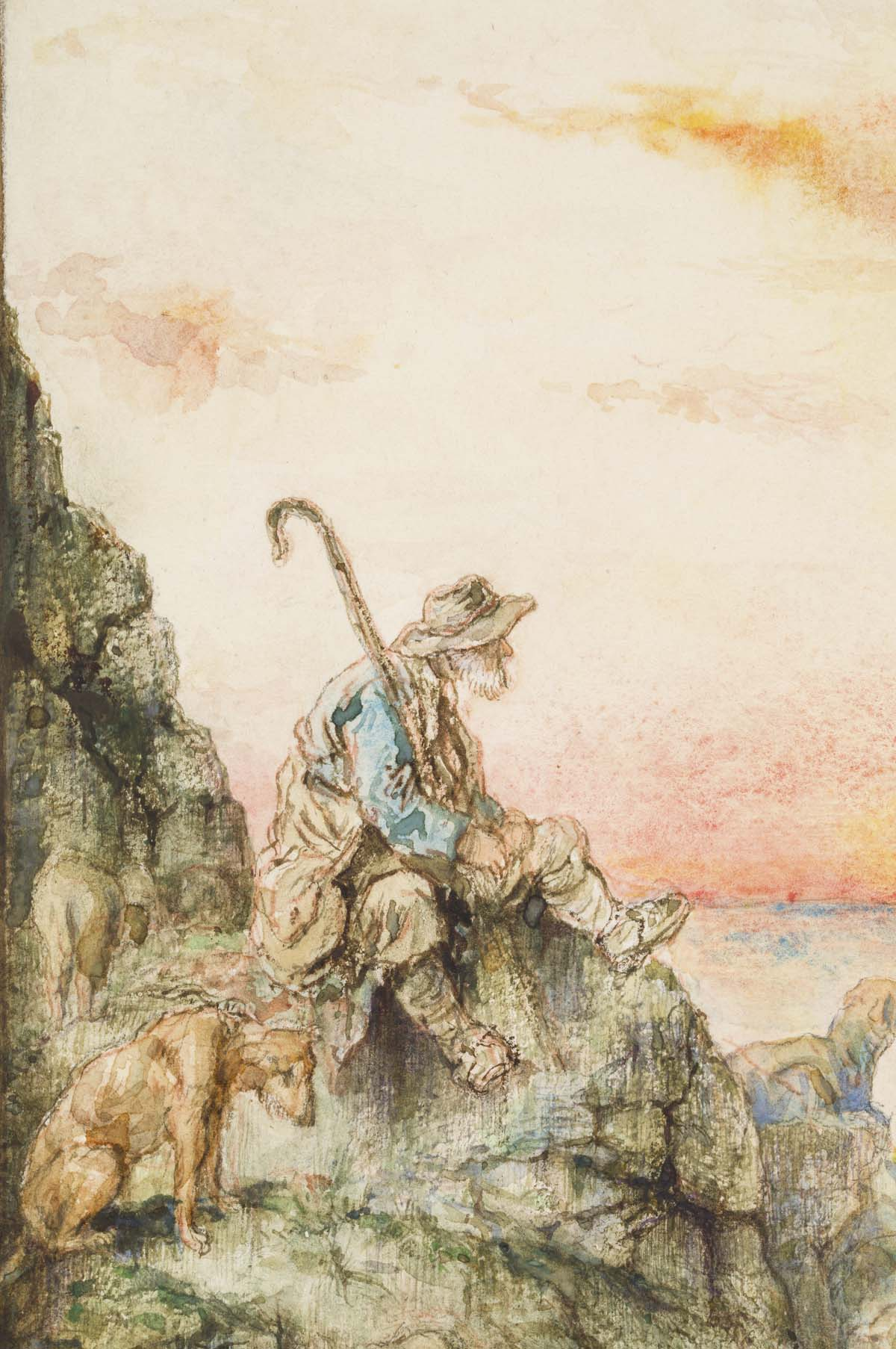
Watercolour by Gustave Moreau, 1881
