= The Hawk and the Nightingale =

Fable

The Hawk and the Nightingale is one of the earliest fables recorded in Greek and there have been many variations on the story since Classical times. The original version is numbered 4 in the Perry Index and the later Aesop version, sometimes going under the title "The Hawk, the Nightingale and the Birdcatcher", is numbered 567. The stories began as a reflection on the arbitrary use of power and eventually shifted to being a lesson in the wise use of resources.

== The Fables ==
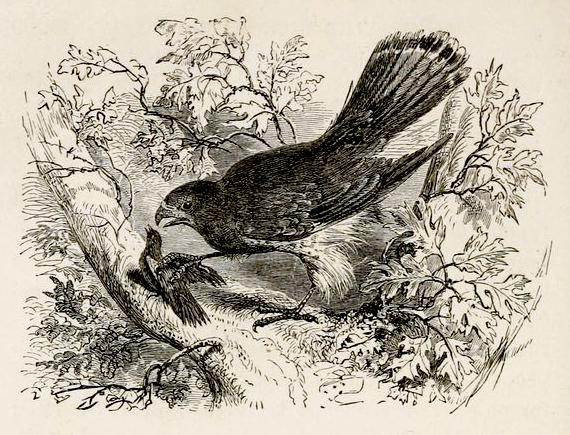
Henry Walker Herrick's illustration of a mid-Victorian edition of Croxall's The Fables of Aesop, Fable LXIV

The original fable appeared in Hesiod's poem Works and Days, vv. 202-12, a work dating from some seven centuries before the Common Era and thus long before Aesop's traditional dates. It is used to illustrate Hesiod's account of man's fall from the Golden Age of innocence to the corrupted Age of Iron. As an example of its violent and arbitrary character, the story is told of a hawk that seizes a nightingale; when the songbird cries in pain, the hawk addresses it: 'Miserable thing, why do you cry out? One far stronger than you now holds you fast, and you must go wherever I take you. And if I please I will make my meal of you, or else let you go. He is a fool who tries to withstand the stronger, for he does not get the mastery and suffers pain besides his shame.'

The fable later ascribed to Aesop is not recorded in any surviving Classical document but began to appear in the early Middle Ages. Some versions extend the picture of violence by having the bird of prey attack the nightingale's nestlings. It agrees to spare them if the nightingale will sing to it, but since the mother bird is consumed with grief, her song sounds forced and shrill. The disappointed hawk then kills one of the chicks but is in turn captured by a fowler. In Renaissance times a number of Neo-Latin authors record alternative versions of the fable with quite different interpretations. They include Laurentius Abstemius' Accipiter et Luscinia cantum pollicens in the late 15th century, Hieronymus Osius' poem De Accipitre et Luscinia (1574) and three poems by Pantaleon Candidus in his 150 Fabulae (1604).

In these fables, the nightgale offers to reward the hawk for its clemency by singing to it. But the hawk answers pragmatically that 'I prefer that you soothe my stomach, for I can live without your songs, but I cannot live without food.' This is the version that La Fontaine transformed into Le milan et le rossignol (the kite and nightingale, Fables IX.17), which ends on the common proverb 'An empty stomach has no ear'. The bird had offered a song based on Classical myth for being spared, a reward that the kite rejects as inedible. The episode makes of the fable as much a statement against the intangibility of art as a lesson in practicality. The proverb dates from Classical times, being noted by Erasmus in his Adagia as originating in Plutarch's "Life of Cato". The same point of view underlies other fables of Aesop dealing with the tyrannical use of power, such as The Wolf and the Lamb, in which sophistry is rejected in the face of hunger.

Still another of Aesop's fables, The fisherman and the little fish, draws much the same conclusion as later European variants of "The Hawk and the Nightingale". The little fish pleads with the angler who has caught it to wait until it is more fully grown, but he prefers not to let go of what he has in hope of some uncertain future gain. By the Middle Ages that sentiment had been encapsulated in the proverb 'A bird in the hand is worth two in the woods', which is translated in a 13th-century Latin work dealing with current proverbs. Other versions have 'ten in the wood', 'three in the sky' and 'two in the bush'. The conclusion of "The fisherman and the little fish" then appears to have been transferred to "The Hawk and the Nightingale" as if it were illustrating the popular proverb with its references to birds.

It is for this reason that Roger L'Estrange closes his rendering of Abstemius' fable by quoting the proverb, where Abstemius had only remarked that useful things are to be preferred to pleasant ones. In this he was followed by the Victorian editor George Fyler Townsend. The sentiment is stated more generally also at the end of the first of Pantaleon's poetic meditations on the fable (133). There the hawk's reply to the nightingale's plea to let it go in preference for larger prey, since it is too small to satisfy the hawk's appetite, echoes Plutarch's comment in the course of quite another anecdote: 'He is a fool who leaves things close at hand to follow what is out of reach'. The shift of focus, from the predator's conduct towards its victim in the original telling to its reason for rejecting the victim's appeal for mercy in the later version, radically alters the fable's interpretation. Where the reader's sympathy for the nightingale was appealed to by Hesiod, it is now the hawk whose behaviour is approved, even by so liberal a commentator as Samuel Croxall. For, in his opinion, They who neglect the Opportunity of reaping a small Advantage in Hopes they shall obtain a better, are far from acting upon a reasonable and well advised Foundation.

The condemnation of arbitrary power originally implicit in the fable was not entirely lost, however. Illustrations of La Fontaine's more nuanced telling by Carle Vernet and Auguste Delierre (1829-1890) underline the violence of the scene. At the centre of a calm and beautiful landscape, the bird of prey rips up the tiny songbird's breast. The Russian fabulist Ivan Krylov carries that violence over into his adaptation of the story as "The cat and the nightingale". There the cat captures a nightingale in what it claims is a friendly spirit and begs to hear its famous song. When the bird gives only a shrill cry of distress, the cat devours it, bones and all. Written in 1824, the story satirised the strict literary censorship of the time in Russia.

It is the threatening nature of the dialogue between the two birds that is featured by Howard J. Buss in his suite of "Sonic Fables: Lessons from Aesop" for five brass and percussionist (1991).
