= The dog who carries his master's dinner round his neck =

1678 fable by La Fontaine

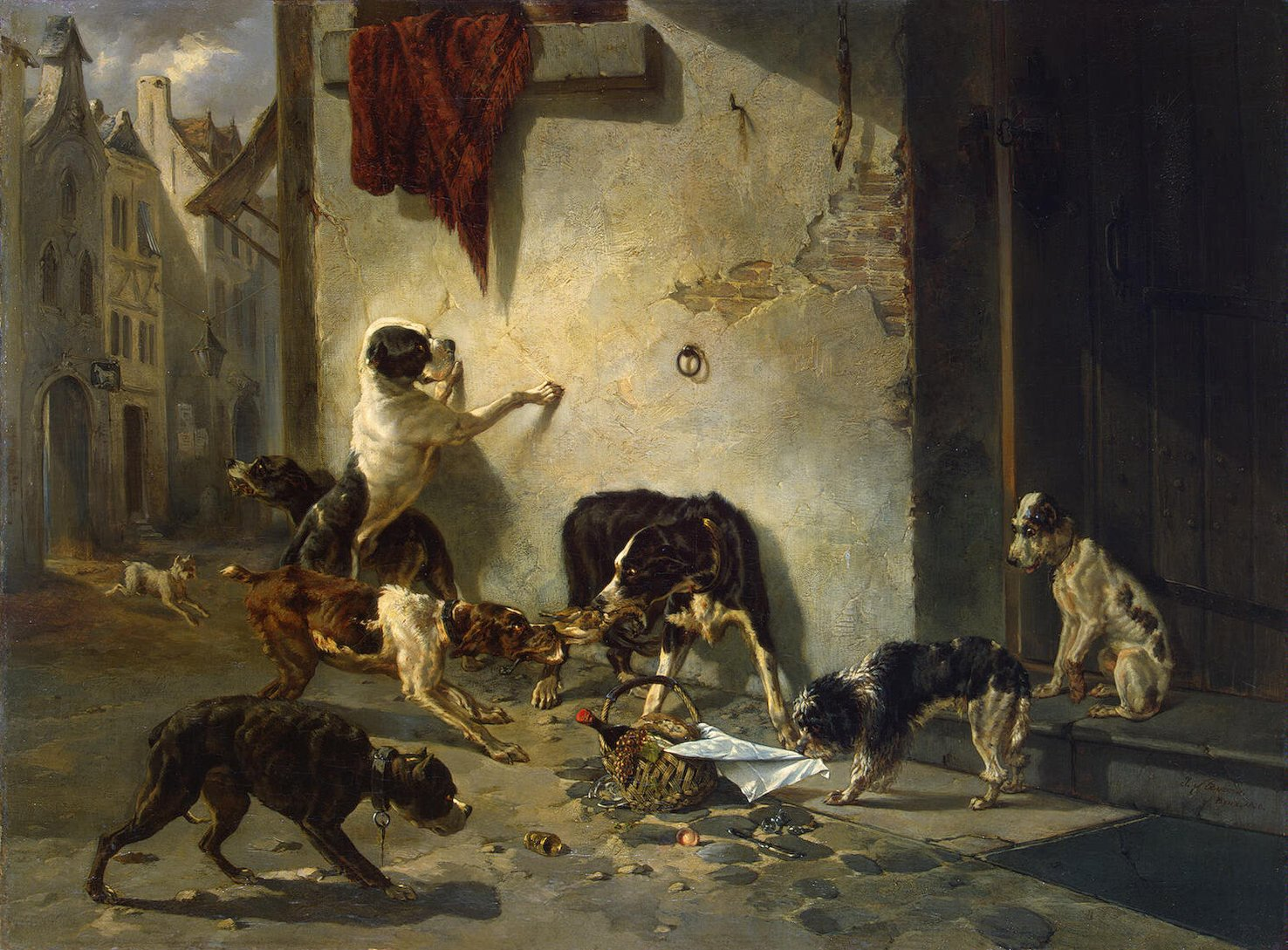
An 1846 painting of the fable by Joseph Stevens

The dog who carries his master’s dinner round his neck is one of La Fontaine's Fables (VIII/7) published in 1678. A story of relatively recent origin then, it was directed against city authorities who defrauded the public funds.

== The fable ==
The fable concerns a dog who has been taught to control its appetite when delivering its master’s dinner while he is at work. It defends its load when attacked by another dog but, when other dogs join the fight, proposes that they share in the spoil and seizes a large piece for itself. La Fontaine’s opening four lines muse on the difficulty humans have in restraining their instincts before he proceeds to an example of an animal who has been so trained and only breaks down when forced by circumstances. He then draws a parallel with the behaviour of those charged with administering public funds.

One French commentator has found a similar story in the Latin fable from Jacques Regnier’s Apologi Phaedrii ex Ludicris (Beaune, 1643), Coqui canis et alii canes (The cook’s dog and the other dogs), in which fidelity is overcome by bad example. However, La Fontaine’s immediate source seems to have been Louis de Puget (1629-1709), whom he got to know during a visit to Lyon. De Puget had versified the story in French as a criticism of the public authorities in his town and showed it to La Fontaine, who took it up and gave it a wider application.

There have been two oil paintings based on La Fontaine’s fable. His illustrator Jean-Baptiste Oudry gave the title to a 1751 depiction of a dog fight in the countryside; in the plate later used in the illustrated edition of the fables, other dogs can be seen racing along the path from the town in the distance. The other painting was made in 1846 by the Belgian dog painter Joseph Stevens (1819–92) and is now in the Hermitage Museum.
