= The Lion Grown Old =

Aesop's fable

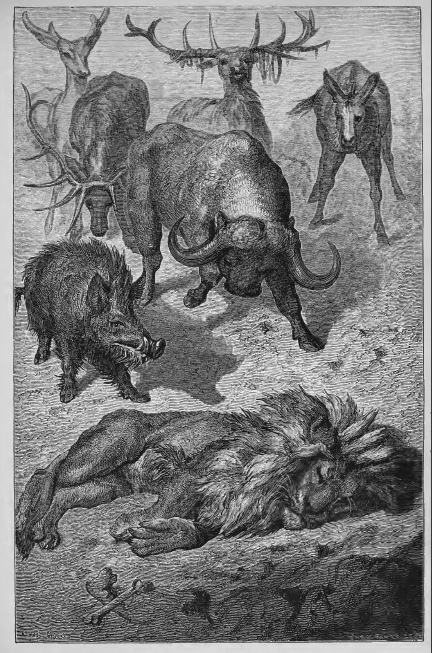
Ernest Griset's illustration of Aesop's fable from 1869

"The Lion Grown Old" is counted among Aesop's Fables and is numbered 481 in the Perry Index. It is used in illustration of the insults given those who have fallen from power and has a similar moral to the fable of The dogs and the lion's skin. Parallel proverbs of similar meaning were later associated with it.

== The fable ==
In the fable as Phaedrus tells it, after the lion had grown old and feeble, a boar and a bull took their revenge for past attacks by injuring him. But when a donkey joins in and kicks him, the lion laments that suffering insult from such a base creature is like a second death. Different animals figure in later accounts. For Marie de France in the 12th century, the bull that gores the lion and the ass that kicks him are joined by a fox that bites at his ears. In her version too, it is not simply that they take advantage of his loss of kingly power but that some of his courtiers have now forgotten past favours. In La Fontaine's 1668 version the attacks come from a horse, a wolf and a bull, as well as the ass, but it ends with exactly the same sentiment as in Phaedrus. La Fontaine's choice of animals is influenced by a tag drawn from Horace, a frequent source for him. Used of the natural instinct of self defence, the Latin Dente lupus, cornu taurus petit (the wolf attacks with his teeth, the bull with his horns, Satires II.1.55) had become proverbial.

The Neo-Latin poem "Leo Senex" by Hieronymus Osius shifted the emphasis to the pain that a formerly powerful human feels now that he cannot protect himself, leaving the cautionary story as no more than a metaphor. William Caxton urged the necessity of humility in his retelling, while tempering tyranny is counselled by other English authors, including Francis Barlow (1667), Roger L'Estrange (1692) and Samuel Croxall (1722).

The English versions of La Fontaine's fable which began to appear from early in the 18th century were also individual interpretations. That in Bernard de Mandeville's Aesop Dress'd (1704) is largely an elegant paraphrase and ends with a clever pun. Charles Denis (Select Fables, 1754) translates the title as "The Old Lion", adds an ape and a fox to the attackers and ends on a new moral, summed up in the line "be good as you are great". The moral stanza added by John Matthews (London 1820) is given a topical twist by being applied to the conduct of politicians and pamphleteers during the madness of King George III. Of Ivan Krylov's two Russian versions of the fable published in 1825, "The Aged Lion" was faithful to La Fontaine's. The second, "The Fox and the Ass", was more of an adaptation: there the Ass boasts of his deed in conversation with a Fox afterwards and the moral drawn at the end is that the most lowly and sycophantic people will be the first to settle scores once the tables are turned.

More modern reinterpretations of La Fontaine's fable have included Ladislas Starevich's film using animated puppets (1932) and several musical settings: by Louis Lacombe as part of his 15 melodies (op. 72, 1875); by Florent Schmitt in his Fables sans morales (Op. 130, 1954); and by Isabelle Aboulker in Les Fables Enchantées (2004). In 1926, Marc Chagall began his series of gouache illustrations of La Fontaine's fables, commissioned by Ambroise Vollard. In that devoted to Le lion devenu vieux, the lion is stretched out at the base, gazing wide-eyed at the viewer while the bull charges, the horse turns its back as it prepares to kick, and the wolf leers at the scene from one side. The colouring is characterised over-all by ochres and browny reds, but toward the top the capering ass is painted blue and lights up the canvas.

== Proverbs ==
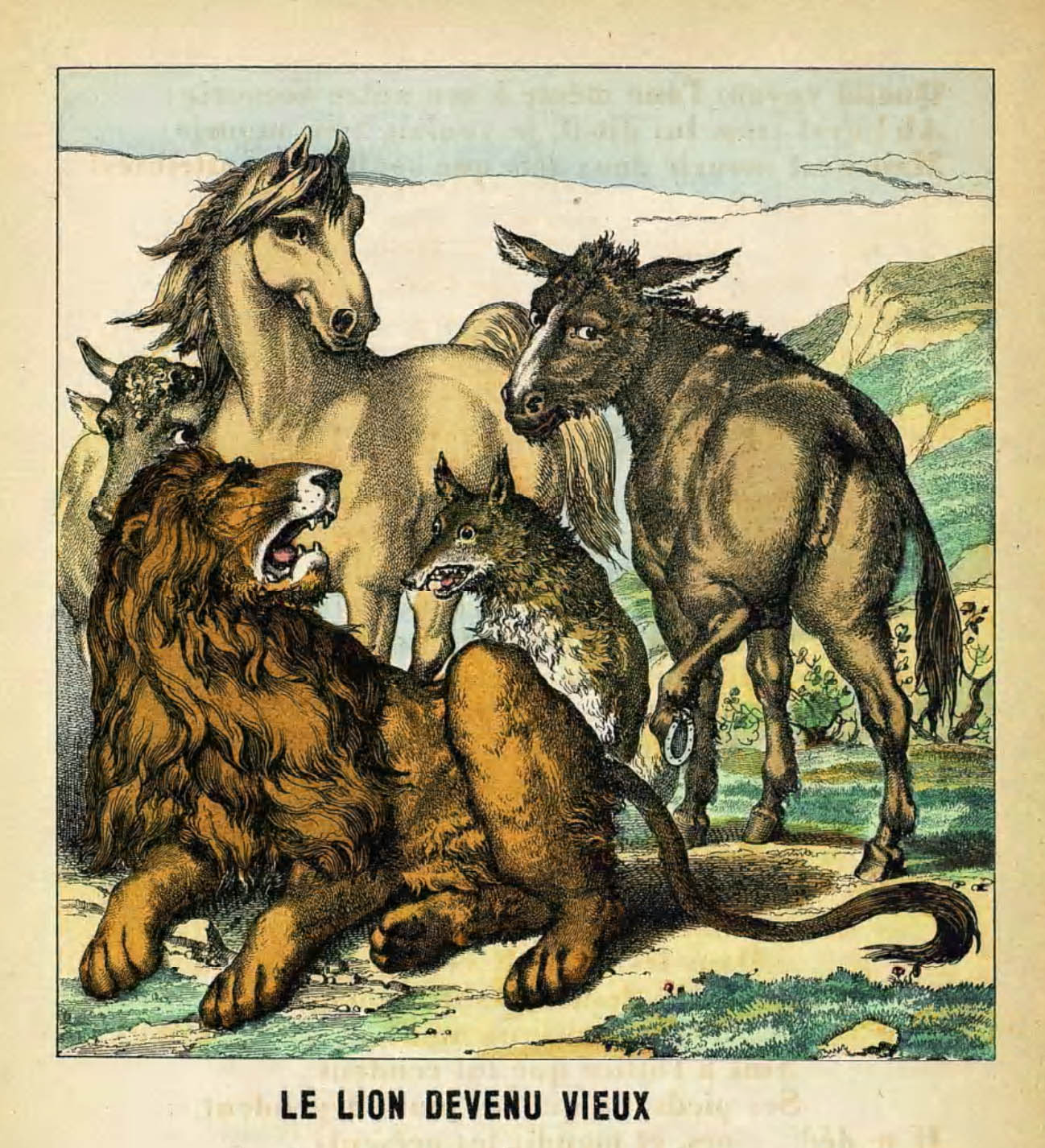
Charles Pinot's illustration of La Fontaine's fable, 1860

The line from Horace inserted by La Fontaine into his Le lion devenu vieux was far from the only Latin proverb associated with the fable. The meaning of two more parallel the fable's moral that those who lose power must suffer from those they had tyrannised previously. One concerns the false valour of tearing the beard of a dead lion (barbam vellere mortuo leoni) that reappears, among other places, as an insult in Shakespeare's play King John (2.i):

You are the hare of whom the proverb goes,
Whose valour plucks dead lions by the beard.

The other proverb also concerned the hare, traditionally the most timorous of beasts, and spread to the rest of Europe from an epigram in the suspect version of the Greek Anthology edited by Maximus Planudes. In this the defeated Hector recalls that even a hare will leap on a dead lion in a line that was later imitated by Andrea Alciato in the poem accompanying his emblem on the futility of wrestling with the dead.

The same proverb was later adapted into a fable by Pieter de la Court in his Sinryke Fabulen (Amsterdam, 1685). His version is prefaced by the Latin equivalent, mortuo leone et lepores insultant, and tells how a selection of animals take their revenge on the dead beast, including wolves, bears, foxes and apes. Finally a hare leaps on the corpse and tears at the beard. While this fable retains scarcely a detail from those of Phaedrus or La Fontaine, its dependence on them is unmistakable.

The popularity of La Fontaine's fables gave rise to still more proverbs that alluded to them, most notably in this case, le coup de pied de l'âne. There were even dialect equivalents such as the Picard L'caup d' pied du baudet, which is glossed in the dictionary that records it as a cowardly insult to someone from whom one has nothing to fear. But the fable's title itself eventually came to be used proverbially, for example as the title of a novel by Ernest Feydeau (Paris 1872) and a historical play by Jean Schlumberger (Paris, 1924). Poetically it appeared as a refrain in a ballade by Alexandre Marie, a mourning of lost powers that has more or less the same theme as Starevich's film. Similarly the fallen Baron Haussmann justified himself in the poem Confessions d'un lion devenu vieux (Paris 1888).
