= The Bear and the Gardener =

Fable

The Bear and the Gardener is a fable originating in the ancient Indian text Panchatantra that warns against making foolish friendships. There are several variant versions, both literary and oral, across the world and its folk elements are classed as Aarne-Thompson-Uther type 1586. The La Fontaine version has been taken as demonstrating various philosophical lessons.

== The Fable ==
The story was introduced to western readers in La Fontaine's Fables (VIII.10). Though L'Ours et l'amateur des jardins is sometimes translated as "The bear and the amateur gardener", the true meaning is 'the garden lover'. It relates how a solitary gardener encounters a lonely bear and they decide to become companions. One of the bear's duties is to keep the flies off his friend when he takes a nap. Unable to drive off a persistent fly, the bear seizes a paving stone to crush it and kills the gardener as well. La Fontaine is considered to have been illustrating the Stoic precept that there should be measure in everything, including the making of friends. In terms of practical philosophy, the story also illustrates the important distinction that the bear fails to realise between the immediate good, in this case keeping the flies off a friend, and the ultimate good of safeguarding his welfare.

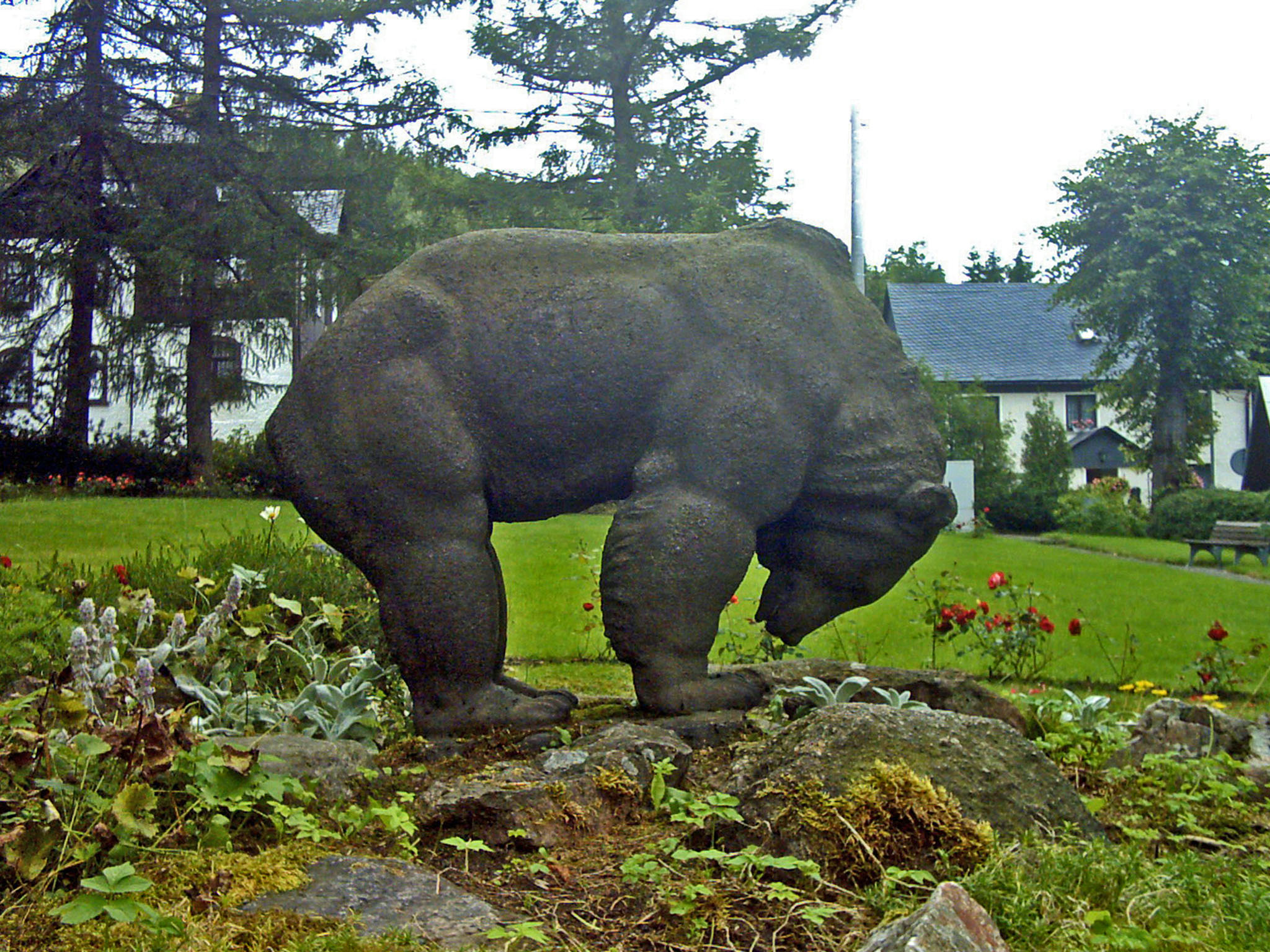
A garden bear

Several lines occurring in the poem are taken as its morals. Midway there is the statement 'In my opinion it's a golden rule/Better be lonely than be with a fool', which the rest of the story bears out. The summing up at the end carries the commentary given by eastern authors that it is better to have a wise enemy than a foolish friend.

The story gained currency in England from the 18th century on through translations or imitations of La Fontaine. One of its earliest appearances was in Robert Dodsley's Select fables of Esop and other fabulists (1764), where it is given the title "The Hermit and the Bear" and provided with the moral "The random zeal of inconsiderate friends is often as hurtful as the wrath of enemies". In this version a hermit has done the bear a good turn; later still this was identified with taking a thorn from its paw, drawing on the story of Androcles and the Lion. Serving the hermit afterwards out of gratitude, the bear only strikes him in the face when driving off a fly, and the two then part. It was this milder version that was taken up in early 19th century rhyming editions for children. Among them are Mary Anne Davis' Fables in Verse: by Aesop, La Fontaine, and others, first published about 1818, and Jefferys Taylor's Aesop in Rhyme (1820). Later in the century the origin of the story was forgotten in England and it was taken as one of Aesop's Fables.

== Variants ==
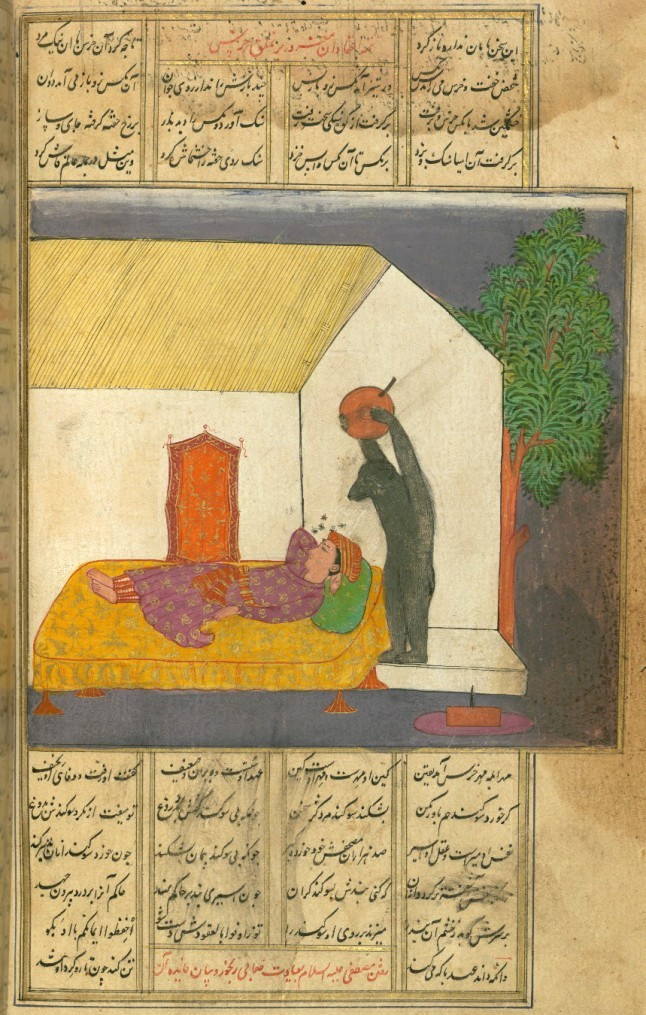
A 1663 Indian miniature of the story from Rumi's Mas̱navī. (Walters Art Museum)

La Fontaine found his fable in a translation of the Bidpai stories, in which the characters are indeed a bear and a gardener. A variant appeared in Rumi's 13th century poem, the Masnavi, which tells the story of a kind man who rescued a bear from a serpent. The animal then devoted itself to its saviour's service and killed him in the manner related.

The story ultimately derives from India, where there are two older versions with different characters. The one from the Panchatantra involves the pet monkey of a king who strikes at the gnat with a sword and causes his master's death. In the Masaka Jataka from the Buddhist scriptures it is a carpenter's foolish son who strikes at a fly on his father's head with an axe. In the former the moral is given as 'Do not choose a fool as a friend', while in the latter it is that 'an enemy with sense is better than a friend without it', which is the sentiment on which La Fontaine closes his fable.

There are yet more variants in the oral tradition. One Pakistani source concerns "The Seven Wise Men of Buneyr", who share at least one exploit with the Wise Men of Gotham; imported into it is the episode of causing injury by trying to drive off flies, in this case from an old woman whom one of them knocks over with the stone he throws in doing so. In Europe the story is of a fool who breaks a magistrate's nose with a cudgel in taking vengeance on a fly. In Italy this is told of Giufà, in Austria of Foolish Hans. A similar episode also occurs at the start of Giovanni Francesco Straparola's tale of Fortunio in Facetious Nights (13.4), written about 1550. That particular collection contains the first instance of several other European folk tales, besides this one.

== Paintings and prints ==
Because of the fable's existence in Eastern sources, it has been a particularly popular subject in Muslim miniatures from the East. Most often they depict the bear with the stone raised in its paws, as in the manuscript copy of the Masnavi dating from 1663 in the Walters Art Museum (see above), and another illustration from Persia dating from a little later. A watercolour in Lucknow style, painted by Sital Das round about 1780 and now in the British Library, shows the bear contemplating the gardener after it has killed him. Yet another Indian miniature of the fable was among those commissioned from the Punjabi artist Imam Bakhsh Lahori in 1837 by a French enthusiast of fables. Now in the Musée Jean de la Fontaine, it shows the bear in an ornamental garden.

Several Western artists have illustrated La Fontaine's fable of "The Bear and the Gardener", including those like Jean-Baptiste Oudry and Gustave Doré who were responsible for entire editions of La Fontaine's work. On the other hand, Jean-Charles Cazin's 1892 oil painting of L'ours et l'amateur des jardins dispenses with the bear altogether. It is a pure landscape showing a southern farm with the ancient gardener slumbering in the foreground. An etching of this was made by Edmond-Jules Pennequin in 1901. Other series that include the fable are the innovative water colours that Gustave Moreau painted in 1886 and the coloured etchings by Marc Chagall (1951) of which L'ours et l'amateur des jardins is number 83. Finally Yves Alix (1890–1969) produced a lithograph of the fable for a de luxe edition of 20 Fables (1966) incorporating the work of as many modernist artists. During the 19th century, the artist Ernest Griset was one of the many artists who illustrated La Fontaine's fables, and it was his design for this fable that appeared on the 1977 Burundi set of postage stamps with the theme of children's stories, but under the title of L'Ermite et l'Ours.

== Idioms ==
The fable has given to the French language the idiom le pavé de l'ours (the bear's paving stone) and to German Bärendienst (a bear's service), both used for doing somebody or something a disservice or bad turn and sometimes for any ill-considered action with an unfortunate result. The Danish and Norwegian word bjørnetjeneste (bear-service) has similar meanings and the idiom also appears in other European languages.
