= The Ass and his Masters =

Aesop's fable

An illustration of the moral that 'the grass is always greener on the other side of the fence'

The Ass and his Masters is a fable that has also gone by the alternative titles The ass and the gardener and Jupiter and the ass. Included among Aesop's Fables, it is numbered 179 in the Perry Index.

== The fable ==
The fable only appears in Greek sources in classical times. In it, an ass in the employ of a gardener complains to the king of the gods that he is not fed adequately and asks for a change of master. He is transferred to a potter and prays for another change because the loads are so heavy. Now he passes to a tanner and regrets leaving his first employer. At a time when slavery was common, the fable was applied to the dissatisfaction felt by slaves.

In Renaissance times two Neo-Latin poets contributed to making the story better known. Gabriele Faerno as Asinus dominus mutans, with the moral that a change of master only brings worse; and Hieronymus Osius as Asinus et olitor (The ass and the gardener, the title by which it was known in Greece), with the comment that habitual dissatisfaction always brings a desire for change. Jean de la Fontaine also added the story to his Fables as L'ane et ses maitres (The ass and his masters, VI.11) with the even harsher comment that providence has better things to do than listen to those who are never satisfied.

In Britain the fable was generally known under the title "The ass and Jupiter" and appears as such in the verse paraphrase of John Ogilby; in the prose collections of Samuel Croxall and Thomas Bewick; and the poetical version of Brooke Boothby. The Dutch painter Dirck Stoop also made an etching of the fable under that title in 1655.

== Change is never for the better ==
Laurentius Abstemius told a different version of the fable in his Hecatomythium (1490). In this the ass, tired of cold and only straw to eat, pines for the end of winter. In spring there is so much work that he wishes for summer, and then for autumn, under the burdens each season brings him, and in the end 'his last Prayer is for Winter again; and that he may but take up his Rest where he began his Complaint'.

Phaedrus, who was a freed slave, did not record the fable about the discontented ass, but a similar moral appears at the end of his version of The Frogs Who Desired a King. The citizens of Athens are grumbling at their new ruler and Aesop advises them, after he has told the fable, 'hoc sustinete, maius ne veniat, malum (hang on to your present evil, lest it become worse).

Some quite different stories exist with much the same moral as this, retaining certain aspects of the story-line of "The Ass and his Masters". These include a succession of three changes, each worse than before, followed by prayer for the preservation of the last.

An early Tudor jest book records a later Classical anecdote. In this an old lady prays for the continued well-being of the tyrant Dionysius I of Syracuse. On being asked by him why, she replies,

Whan I was a mayde, we had a tyran raignynge ouer us, whose death I greatly desyred; whan he was slayne, there succided an other yet more cruell than he, out of whose gouernance to be also deliuered I thought it a hygh benifyte. The thyrde is thy selfe, that haste begon to raygne ouer vs more importunately than either of the other two. Thus, fearynge leest, whan thou arte gone, a worse shuld succede and reigne ouer vs, I praye God dayly to preserue the in helthe.

The story had earlier appeared in Thomas Aquinas' De Regimine Principum, in the context of a discussion of the drawbacks of resisting tyranny.

Slightly earlier in the Middle Ages, Odo of Cheriton had drawn a similar lesson from a monastic situation. His light-hearted story concerns monks who pray for the death of their abbot. The first had given them three courses at a meal but not enough to satisfy their hunger; after his death he is succeeded by an abbot who allows them only two courses, and then on his death by one who allows only a single course. One of the monks then prays for the long life of this abbot for fear that they might starve altogether under a successor.
