= The Heron and the Fish =

Ancient fable

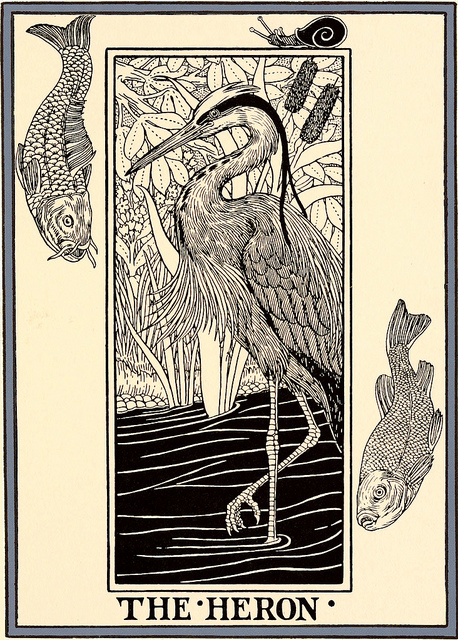
Percy Billinghurst's illustration in 100 Fables of La Fontaine (London 1899)

The Heron and the Fish is a situational fable constructed to illustrate the moral that one should not be over-fastidious in making choices since, as the ancient proverb proposes, 'He that will not when he may, when he will he shall have nay'. Of ancient but uncertain origin, it gained popularity after appearing among La Fontaine's Fables.

== Origin and variations ==
The first occurrence of the fable about the fastidious heron occurs in a late Mediaeval manuscript of Latin prose fables called Opusculum fabularum (little collection of fables), which claims to have rendered them from the Greek. A heron stands by the waterside one morning, surrounded by a rich choice of fish which it ignores since it is not ready to eat. During the afternoon it rejects humbler types of fish as unworthy, hoping for better pickings but, by evening, is so hungry that it settles for a snail.

The Italian fabulist Laurentius Abstemius seems to have imitated the theme in his story of the Fowler and the Chaffinch (De aucupe et fringilla), included in his Hecatomythium as fable 39. A bird-catcher who has waited all day, hoping for a larger catch, comes away in the end with no more than a chaffinch. Roger L'Estrange included a translation of it in his 1692 fable collection, drawing the moral that Men are so greedy after what's to come, which is uncertain, that they slip present Opportunities, which are never to be recovered.

The fable of the heron was given popularity in France at a slightly earlier date than in England by being included in the second edition of La Fontaine's Fables, (VII.4). There it is given a certain intertextuality when the heron's 'disdainful choice' is compared to that of the town mouse visiting his country cousin in the tale of The Town Mouse and the Country Mouse. La Fontaine is referring to Horace's version of that fable, but then proposes to give a human example of the situation he describes and proceeds straight away to tell the fable of a fastidious beauty (VII.5) who turns down all suitors when she is young and has to take what she can get after her looks fade.

In the 18th century there was an English imitation of La Fontaine's fable of the heron in Rowland Rugeley's "The Heron: a fable for young maids". But it was often the later application to human conduct that was preferred by La Fontaine's imitators. Charles Denis gave that a lively recreation as "The Old Maid" who eventually married her footman in his Selected Fables (1754). The same situation was adapted as "The Dainty Spinster" by Ivan Krylov in 1806 and later included among his fables.

== A question of authorship ==
The fable of the heron is not ascribed to any author in the Opusculum fabularum, although it appears there among others reckoned as Aesop's. It was La Fontaine who was responsible for changing the utilitarian lesson of seizing the opportunity while it is there to an examination of the heron's motives for passing it up. The bird is too fussy and full of self-regard. These qualities were emphasised when the fable first appeared in English during the 19th century as a translation of La Fontaine's version.

However, a French version of the fable was put into the mouth of Aesop by Edmé Boursault in his play Esope à la Cour at the start of the 18th century, although the telling is placed in the context of making a marriage choice, following La Fontaine. When the story appears in the American Aesop for Children (1919), it is still clearly La Fontaine's fable that is being retold. But by the time the fable reappears in Arin Murphy-Hiscock's Birds, A Spiritual Field Guide (2012), she asserts there that it is "one of Aesop's fables [and] tells of a heron that strolled next to a river in shadow, watching for food. It passed up several small fish and ended up going hungry when the fish moved to cooler water, out of the heron's reach". The telling too has travelled some distance away from the lakeside heron described in the Opusculum fabularum.

Other versions for children claim Aesop as original author and spin out the detail of the original pithy fable. They include Tony Payne's "The Heron and the Fish" (UK 1993), Graham Percy's "The Heron and the Fish" (UK 2009), and Gwen Petreman's "The Blue Heron". However, the fable is not included as Aesop's in the Perry Index.

== Artistic interpretations ==
Several artists from the 17th century onwards have provided woodcuts for the whole run of La Fontaine's fables, most of which go little beyond illustrating the bird standing beside the water. The most original was J.J.Grandville's transposition of the characters into contemporary terms. The heron is on the left, gazing askance at the fish which impertinently peep at him from the shallows. To the right, the old maid of La Fontaine's parallel fable hangs on the arm of a bloated individual. To drive the lesson home, the slug soon to be devoured crawls through the grass at the feet of both. There was also an English set of illustrations of La Fontaine's fables issued on the Staffordshire pottery of Brown, Westhead & Moore in 1880 which included an attractive design of the fable under the title "The Proud Heron".

Two 19th-century painters provided oil panels now in the collection of the Musée Jean de La Fontaine. Both represent the bird standing by the waterside. Léon Rousseau's was part of a set painted in 1853, while that of Louis-Emile Villa (1836–1900) is undated. In the 20th century, the fable was the subject of one of Jean Vernon's medallions. The heron faces right and looks down from the bank at fishes swimming in the water. It is faced by a smaller figure on the right that is about to swallow a snail.

There have also been musical interpretations. Maurice Thiriet included it as the first piece in his Trois fables de La Fontaine for a capella children's voices, and in 2014 Eric Saint-Marc set it for women's choir, piano and string quartet. In addition it was included in Annie Sellem's ballet project Les fables à la Fontaine (2004), where it was choreographed by Satchie Noro and included among the four segments in the film version directed by Marie-Hélène Rebois.
