= Der Kuckuck und der Esel =

German children's song

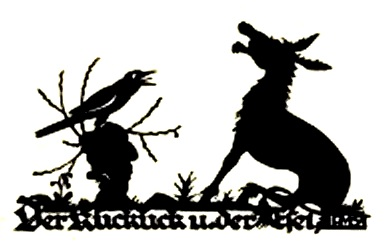
Der Kuckuck und der Esel, silhouette, early 20th century

Der Kuckuck und der Esel (The cuckoo and the donkey) is a well known old German children's song from the early 19th century. Its text was written by Hoffmann von Fallersleben in 1835, the melody had already been composed by Carl Friedrich Zelter in 1810. The song is about a singing contest between a cuckoo and a donkey.

== Content ==
The song is about a cuckoo and a donkey, who both argue about their singing talents. Both are selfish and both can't accept the other's singing talents.

== Text ==
Der Kuckuck und der Esel,
die hatten großen Streit,
wer wohl am besten sänge
zur schönen Maienzeit.

Der Kuckuck sprach: "Das kann ich!"
und hub gleich an zu schrei'n.
"Ich aber kann es besser!"
fiel gleich der Esel ein.

Das klang so schön und lieblich,
so schön von fern und nah;
sie sangen alle beide
"Kuckuck, Kuckuck, i-a, i-a!"

The cuckoo and the donkey,
they had a dreadful fight:
which one would sing the sweetest
when lovely May arrived.

The cuckoo said: "I can do it!"
and carried out his song.
"But I can do it better!"
the donkey brayed along.

How sweet and how melodious,
it sounded wide and far:
they were singing both together
"Goo-koo, Goo-koo, ee-ah, ee-ah!"

== Background ==
There is an ironic tone hidden between the lines, showing that both combatants are anything but talented: The cuckoo hits the notes perfectly, but can only sing memorized, monotone strophes. The donkey is loud and resonant, but he never hits any recognisable note: the singing contest is carried out by two bad singers. This makes the song "Der Kuckuck und der Esel" some sort of satire.

The song itself is some sort of pun to a well known poem named "Lob des hohen Verstandes" (Praise of the high mind), published in the book Des Knaben Wunderhorn (The boy's magic horn) by Clemens Brentano and Achim von Arnim between 1805 and 1808. In this poem a nightingale wages a singing contest with a cuckoo. Unfortunately, the tournament judge is a donkey, who announces the cuckoo as the winner. The reason for the odd decision is the lack of knowledge by the donkey for music and musical talents: the donkey says that the cuckoo was the better singer, for this bird sings simple, well-memorized strophes. The nightingale instead loses the contest because her singing was too complicated, confusing and elusive for the donkey's mind.
