= The Frogs Who Desired a King =

Aesop's fable

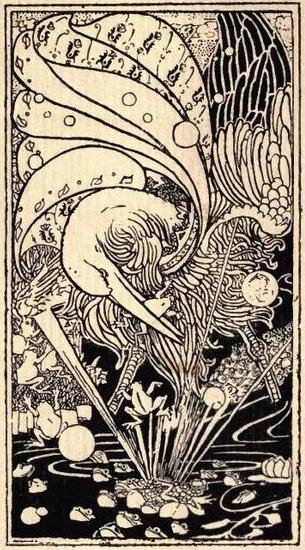
An Art Nouveau illustration by Charles Robinson from an 1895 edition

The Frogs Who Desired a King is one of Aesop's Fables and numbered 44 in the Perry Index. Throughout its history, the story has been given a political application.

== The fable ==
According to the earliest source, Phaedrus, the story concerns a group of frogs who called on the great god Zeus to send them a king. He threw down a log, which fell in their pond with a loud splash and terrified them. Eventually one of the frogs peeped above the water and, seeing that it was no longer moving, soon all hopped upon it and made fun of their king.

Then the frogs made a second request for a real king and were sent down a water snake that started eating them. Once more the frogs appealed to Zeus, but this time he replied that they must face the consequences of their request.

In later variations of the story, the water snake is often replaced with a stork or heron.

== Commentary, analysis and depiction ==
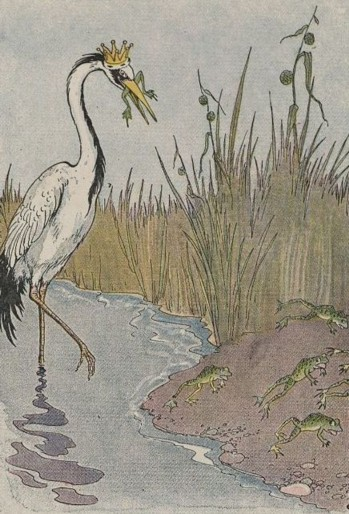
The Frogs Who Desired a King, illustrated by Milo Winter in a 1919 Aesop anthology

The original context of the story, as related by Phaedrus, makes it clear that people feel the need of laws but are impatient of personal restraint. His closing advice is to be content for fear of worse. By the time of William Caxton, who published the first version in English, the lesson drawn is that 'he that hath liberty ought to kepe it wel, for nothyng is better than liberty'. In his version, it is a heron rather than a snake that is sent as king. A later commentator, the English Royalist Roger L'Estrange, sums up the situation thus: "The mob are uneasy without a ruler. They are as restless with one; and oftner they shift, the worse they are: so that Government or no Government, a King of God's making or of the Peoples, or none at all, the Multitude are never to be satisfied."

Yet another view was expressed by German theologian Martin Luther in his "On Governmental Authority" (1523). There he speaks of the scarcity of good rulers, taking this lack as a punishment for human wickedness. He then alludes to this fable to illustrate how humanity deserves the rulers it gets: 'frogs must have their storks.' The author Christoff Mürer has a similar sentiment in his emblem book XL emblemata miscella nova (1620). Under the title Freheit there is a verse that warns that those who do not appreciate freedom are sent a tyrant by divine will.

The story was one of the 39 Aesop's fables chosen by Louis XIV of France for the labyrinth of Versailles, a hedge maze of hydraulic statues created for him in 1669 in the Gardens of Versailles, at the suggestion of Charles Perrault. It is likely he was aware of its interpretation in favour of contentment with the status quo. Jean de la Fontaine's fable of Les grenouilles qui desirent un roi (III.4) follows the Phaedrus version fairly closely and repeats the conclusion there. In setting the scene, however, he pictures the frogs as 'tiring of their democratic state', taking in 1668 much the same sardonic stance as Roger L'Estrange would do in 1692. La Fontaine was writing shortly after the restoration of the monarchy in England following a period of republican government; L'Estrange made his comment three years after a revolution had overthrown the restored regime and installed another.

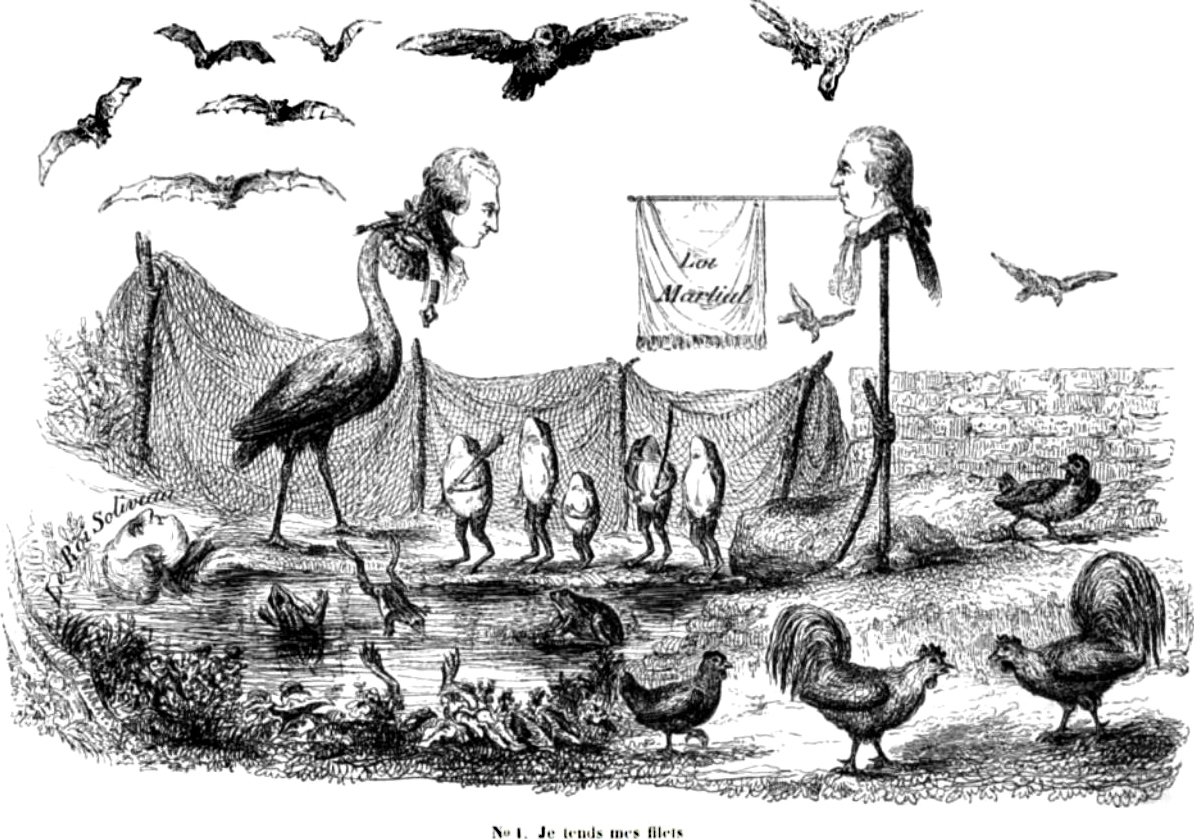
Le Roi Soliveau

As soon as the French had their own experience of regime-change, illustrators began to express their feelings through this fable too. A cartoon dating from 1791 and titled Le roi soliveau, ou les grenouilles qui demandent un roi (King Log, or the frogs demand a king) wryly portrays those responsible for the Champ de Mars massacre. In the following century, the caricaturist Grandville turned to illustrating La Fontaine's fables after a censorship law made life difficult for him. There it is a recognisably imperial stork who struts through the water wearing a laurel crown, cheered on one side by sycophantic supporters and causing havoc on the other. Ernest Griset, the son of French political refugees from yet another change of regime, followed the same example. His horrific picture of a gruesome skeletal stork seated on a bank and swallowing his prey appeared in an 1869 edition of Aesop's fables. It is his comment on the Second French Empire that had driven his parents into exile.

The gloom of 19th-century illustrators was mitigated by a more light-hearted touch in the following century. In the 1912 edition of Aesop's Fables, Arthur Rackham chose to picture the carefree frogs at play on their King Log, a much rarer subject among illustrators. But the French artist Benjamin Rabier, having already illustrated a collection of La Fontaine's fables, subverted the whole subject in a later picture, Le Toboggan ('The sleigh-run', 1925). In this, the stork too has become a willing plaything of the frogs as they gleefully hop onto his back and use his bill as a water-slide.

== Literary allusions ==
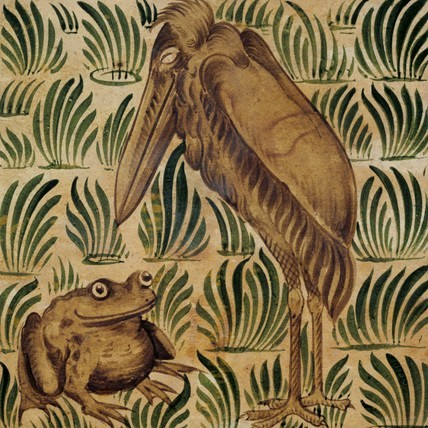
A tile design by William de Morgan, 1872 (Victoria & Albert Museum)

The majority of literary allusions to the fable have contrasted the passivity of King Log with the energetic policy of King Stork, but it was pressed into the service of political commentary in the title "King Stork and King Log: at the dawn of a new reign", a study of Russia written in 1895 by the political assassin Sergey Stepnyak-Kravchinsky, using the pen-name S. Stepniak. The book contrasts the policy of the reactionary Tsar Alexander III with the likely policy under Nicholas II, who had only just succeeded to the throne.

As well as a later passing reference in the title of Alyse Gregory's feminist novel King Log and Lady Lea (1929), the fable was also reinterpreted in one of Margaret Atwood's four short fictions in a 2005 issue of the magazine Daedalus. Entitled "King Log in Exile", it features the deposed king musing on his ineffective reign, gradually illustrating that his inertia hid not harmlessness but a corrupt selfishness.

Two modern poetical references are dismissive. Thom Gunn alludes to the fable in the opening stanzas of his poem "The Court Revolt". The situation described is a conspiracy in which many courtiers connive out of sheer boredom: 'King stork was welcome to replace a log'. New Zealand poet James K. Baxter, on the other hand, expresses a preference in his epigram Election 1960:

A democratic people have elected
King Log, King Stork, King Log, King Stork again.

Because I like a wide and silent pond
I voted Log. That party was defeated.

W. H. Auden recreated the fable at some length in verse as part of the three "Moralities" he wrote for the German composer Hans Werner Henze to set for orchestra and children's chorus in 1967. The theme of all three is the wrong choices made by people who do not sufficiently appreciate their good fortune when they have it. The first poem of the set follows the creatures' fall, from a state of innocence when In the first age the frogs dwelt at peace, into dissatisfaction, foolishness and disaster. Two centuries earlier, the German poet Gotthold Ephraim Lessing had given the theme an even darker reinterpretation in his "The Water Snake" (Die Wasserschlange). Taking its beginning from the Phaedrus version, the poem relates how a frog asks the snake why it is devouring his kind. 'Because you have invited me to,' is the reply; but when the frog denies this, the snake declares that it will therefore eat the frog because he has not. Part of a set of variations on Aesopic themes, this appears as the last in Gary Bachlund's setting of five fables by Lessing (Fünf Fabelen, 2008).

Earlier musical settings included one by Louis-Nicolas Clérambault of words based on La Fontaine's fable (1730s) and Louis Lacombe's setting of La Fontaine's own words (Op. 72) for four men's voices as part of his 15 fables de La Fontaine (1875). It also figures as the third of Maurice Thiriet's Trois fables de La Fontaine for four children singing a cappella.

== Films ==
In 1922, Polish animator Ladislas Starevich produced in Paris a stop-motion animated film based on the tale, entitled Les Grenouilles qui demandent un roi (aka Frogland). One of the earliest animated films to act as political commentary, he used the fable as a means to criticize the situation that was developing back home.

The final episode of the BBC series I, Claudius (1976), following the frequent allusions in Robert Graves' source novel Claudius the God, was titled "Old King Log". In it the aging emperor refers to himself as such, to the confusion of his advisors.
