= Gilbert Gaulmin =

French sholar and poet (1585-1665)

Gilbert Gaulmin was a French magistrate, scholar, and orientalist. He was born in Moulins in 1585 and died in Paris on December 8, 1665.

== Biography ==
Gaulmain was born in Moulins. After the death of his first wife, he went to Paris and was made an attorney (avocat général) in the Great Council in 1625. He was put in the Bastille prison for a while due to charges of libertinism under Cardinal Richelieu, an imprisonment that was commuted to exile in Dijon through the intervention of the prince of Condé. He was not able to return to Paris until after the death of the cardinal. During the Fronde, he was loyal to Cardinal Mazarin and was named intendant of Nivernais in 1649. He was then made a Master of Requests (and head of this group), then Conseiller d'État.

A common witticism resulted from a marriage that he wanted to enter into when he was over sixty years old: his vicar having refused to solemnize the marriage, Gaulmin himself declared that the young girl would become his wife; following this, the phrase “Gaulmin marriage” (“mariage à la Gaulmine”) was used.

He had an exceptional gift for languages and mastered Latin and Greek very early; in his edition of Rhodanthe et Dosiclès, he included a Greek poem that he wrote when he was 16 years old. In 1615, his friend Jacques-Philippe de Maussac, in dedicating his De lapidum virtutibus to Gaulmin, called him a “pentaglot,” knowing, besides Latin and Greek, Hebrew, Arabic, and Turkish. In 1639, Scottish mathematician James Hume, comparing Gaulmin to Pico della Mirandola, praised him for also knowing Persian and Armenian. In 1648, Balthazar Gerbier also credited him with the knowledge of Italian and Spanish. He learned Arabic first with Étienne Hubert, royal physician and professor of Arabic at the Collège de France, and then under Gabriel Sionita, a Maronite who arrived in Paris in 1614 and who succeeded Hubert. Gaulmin was taught Hebrew by a converted Jewish man, Philippe d'Aquin, who in 1610 was named a professor of Hebrew at the Collège de France. A letter from Nicolas-Claude Fabri de Peiresc, dated 1635, indicates that Gaulmin had at his service “Hazard, student from Lebanon” (“le sieur Hazard, estudiant au mont Liban”), the last name also spelled “Hazand,” “Hazaed,” or “Hazaid”; the name of the author indicated in the translation of the Livre des lumières (“David Sahid of Ispahan, capital city of Persia) is doubtless that of this man.

Gaulmin was part of a circle of learned orientalists of the time, passionate about the study of languages and the collection of manuscripts. Around 1650, he owned a library of oriental books estimated at a price of 20,000 crowns, which he agreed to sell, at the instigation of Isaac Vossius, to Christina, Queen of Sweden (but not much is known about the transaction; the books, in any case, soon returned to France).

As for Gaulmin’s thought, René Pintard cites the judgment of Charles de Saint-Évremond: “He had, concerning religion, ideas quite different from ordinary sentiments”; it is notably his audacious exegesis of biblical texts, “quite disconcerting for the theologians of his time,” that led him to his time in the Bastille. However, François Secret, in an article in the Revue de l'histoire des religions, analyzes him not a “libertine” in the sense of an atheist, but as a Christian Kabbalist (like his contemporary Jacques Gaffarel.

== Works ==
The main editions of texts, with Latin translation, that are owed to Gaulmin are De operatione dæmonum, attributed to Michael Psellos (1615); Les amours d'Ismène et d'Isménias, by Eustathios Makrembolites (1617); Les amours de Rhodanthe et de Dosiclès, by Theodore Prodromos (1625); and the De vita et morte Mosis, an anonymous Hebrew text (1629). But Gaulmin’s most famous publication is the Livre des lumières en la conduite des rois composé par le sage Pilpay (1644), dedicated to chancellor Pierre Séguier by “David Sahid of Ispahan,” a translation in French of a Persian edition of the Panchatantra (or Book of Kalîla and Dimna), which popularized the “Fables of Pilpay” in France.
