= The Horse and the Donkey =

One of Aesop's Fables

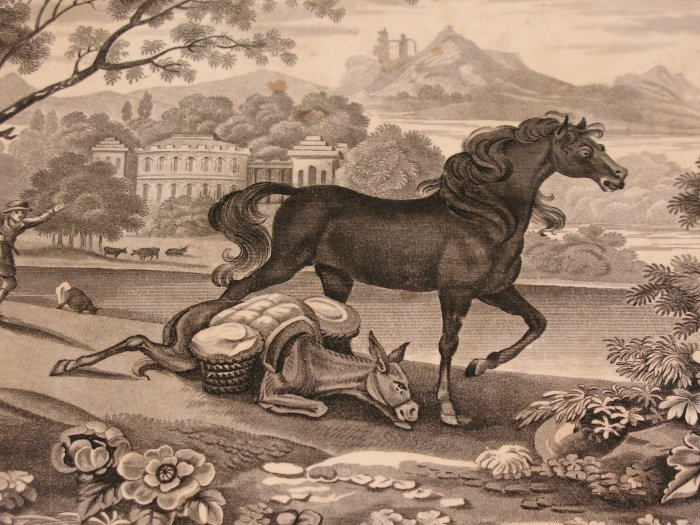
The fable illustrated on an 1830s pottery platter

The Horse and the Donkey is one of a number of ancient animal fables that illustrate the importance of helping others and the consequences of neglecting that duty.

== Versions of the fable ==
The fable is a variant of stories recorded since antiquity of which there is scarcely one version that concerns the same pair of animals. It is included as one of Aesop's Fables and numbered 181 in the Perry Index, and other Greek sources also pair a donkey and a mule, while the story is told of an ox and a donkey in the Mediaeval Latin version of Ademar of Chabannes. In the former the overburdened donkey asks its companion for help in carrying its load and dies when this is refused; the other is then forced to carry not only the original load but the dead animal's skin as well. In Ademar's story the two animals are yoked together but the ass refuses to pull its weight; after the ox dies of the strain, the ass is forced to continue pulling and also dies.

There are references to the fable in two other texts six centuries apart. The Aramaic collection of wise sayings by Ahiqar, dating from 500 BCE, mentions that "An ass which leaves its load and does not carry it shall take a load from its companion and take the burden which is not its [own with its own] and shall be made to bear a camel's load". The historian Plutarch has a version with an ox and a camel feature where "as the ox said to his fellow-servant the camel, when he refused to ease him of his burthen, It won't be long before you carry my burthen and me too: which fell out to be true, when the ox died".

The fable does not appear in William Caxton's collection of Aesop's Fables although it does in later English compilations. La Fontaine's Fables further popularised the story as "The Horse and the Ass". This begins with the moral that, in Classical versions, is usually put into the mouth of the remaining animal:

In this world each should another aid,
For if one neighbour dies, it's on your back
His burden surely shall be laid.
