= The Ass in the Lion's Skin =

Fable

The Ass in the Lion's Skin is one of Aesop's Fables, of which there are two distinct versions. There are also several Eastern variants, and the story's interpretation varies accordingly.

== Fables ==
Arthur Rackham illustration, 1912

Of the two Greek versions of this story, the one catalogued as number 188 in the Perry Index concerns an ass that puts on a lion's skin, and amuses himself by terrifying all the foolish animals. At last coming upon a fox, he tries to frighten him also, but the fox no sooner hears the sound of his voice than he exclaims, "I might possibly have been frightened myself, if I had not heard your bray." The moral of the story is often quoted as, clothes may disguise a fool, but his words will give him away. It is this version that appears as Fable 56 in the collection by Babrius.

The second version is listed as number 358 in the Perry Index. In this the ass puts on the skin in order to be able to graze undisturbed in the fields, but he is given away by his ears and is chastised. In addition to the Greek versions, there is a Latin version by Avianus, dating from the later fifth century. This version was adapted by William Caxton, with the moral cautioning against presumption. Literary allusions to this fable have been frequent since classical times and into the Renaissance, such as in William Shakespeare's King John. La Fontaine's Fable 5.21 (1668) also follows this version. The moral La Fontaine draws is not to trust to appearances, because clothes do not make the man.

== Folk motifs and proverbial use ==
In India, the same situation appears in Buddhist scriptures as the Sihacamma Jataka. Here the ass's master puts the lion's skin over his beast, and turns it loose to feed in the grain fields during his travels. The village watchmen are usually too terrified to do anything, but finally one of them raises the villagers. When they chase the ass, it begins to bray, betraying its true identity, and is then beaten to death. A related tale, the Sihakottukha Jataka, plays on the motif of being given away by one's voice. In this story, a lion sires a son on a she-jackal. The child resembles his father, but has a jackal's howl, and is therefore advised to remain silent. A common European variant on this theme appears in the Ladino Sephardic proverb, asno callado, por sabio contado: "a silent ass is considered wise." An English equivalent is "a fool is not known until he opens his mouth." A similar Biblical proverb is “Even a fool is counted wise when he holds his peace; When he shuts his lips, he is considered perceptive.”

The story and its variants are alluded to idiomatically in various languages. In Latin it is leonis exuviae super asinum. In Mandarin Chinese it is "羊質虎皮" (pronunciation:yang(2) zhi(4) hu(3) pi(2)), "a goat in a tiger's skin." In the Chinese story, a goat disguises itself as a lion, but continues to eat grass as usual. When it spies a wolf, instinct takes over and the goat takes to its heels.

== Later allusions ==
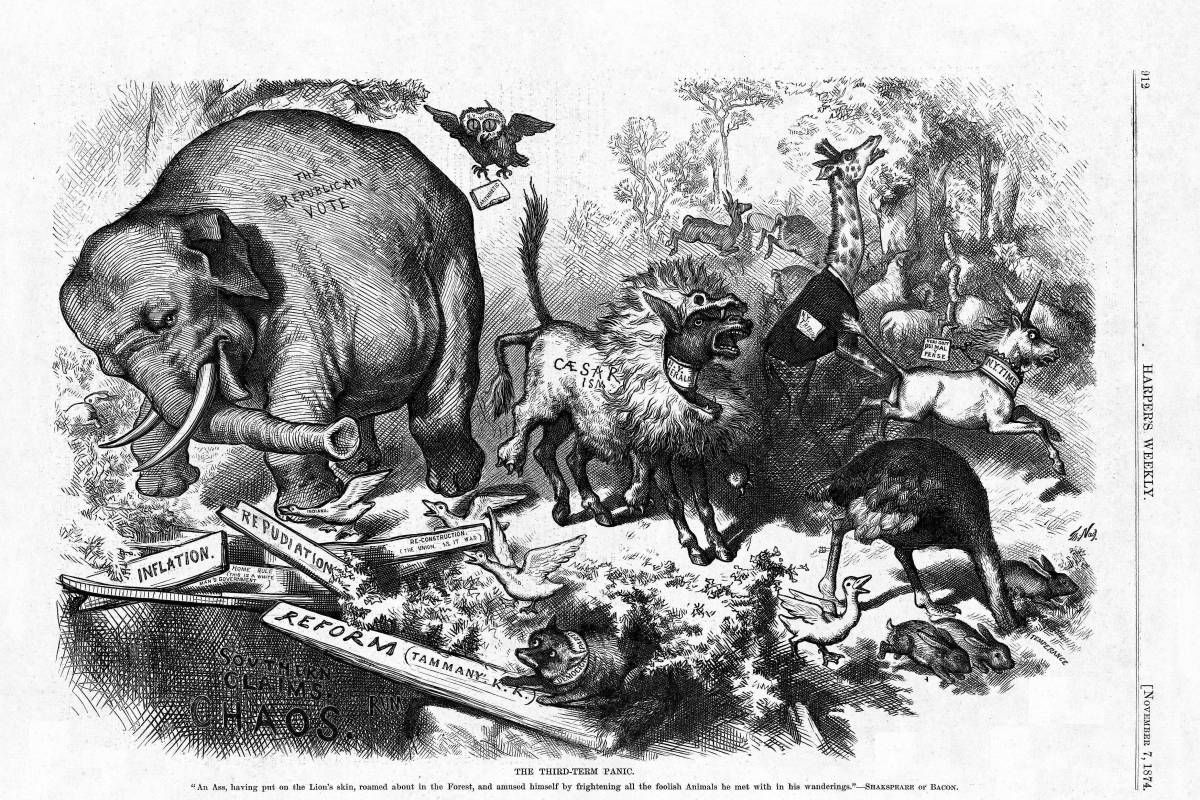
Thomas Nast's cartoon "Third Term Panic"

"The Ass in the Lion's Skin" was one of the several Aesop's fables put to use by American political cartoonist Thomas Nast, when it was rumoured in 1874 that Republican president Ulysses S. Grant intended to stand for election for an unprecedented third term in 1876. At the same time, there was a false report that animals had escaped from the Central Park Zoo, and were roaming the streets of New York. Nast combined the two items in a cartoon for the November 7 edition of Harpers Weekly. Titled "Third Term Panic", it depicts a donkey in a lion's skin, labelled "Caesarism", and scattering other animals that stand for various interests.

In the twentieth century, C. S. Lewis put the fable to use in the final volume of The Chronicles of Narnia. A donkey is tricked into wearing a lion's skin so as to deceive the simple-minded into believing that Aslan the lion has returned. Kathryn Lindskoog identifies the Avianus version as the source of this episode.
