= The Fisherman and the Little Fish =

Aesop's fable

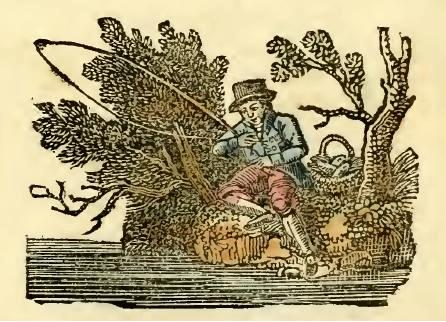
An illustration of the fable from an Irish edition of 1821

The Fisherman and the Little Fish is one of Aesop's fables. It is numbered 18 in the Perry Index. Babrius records it in Greek and Avianus in Latin. The story concerns a small fry caught by a fisherman (or "angler") that begs for its life on account of its size and suggests that waiting until it is larger would make it a more filling meal. The fisherman refuses, giving as his reason that every little amount helps and that it is stupid to give up a present advantage for an uncertain future gain. The fable was given further currency in La Fontaine's Fables (V. 3).

The popularity of the fable in England was eventually overtaken by the similar story "The Hawk and the Nightingale", which had the advantage of being reinforced by the proverb "A bird in the hand is worth two in the bush". La Fontaine had no such proverb in French to which to appeal and ends on the reflection that one possession is better than two promises (Un 'tiens' vaut mieux que deux 'tu l'auras'). However, his English translator Charles Denis adapts the line to the circumstances and renders it as "A fish in the pan is worth two in the pond", while in his verse retelling in the following century, Guy Wetmore Carryl concludes that "a trout on a plate/ Beats several in the aquarium".

== Artistic interpretations ==
English illustrations in books have almost invariably pictured an angler sitting on the river bank and peering at the fish. The same theme is found on tiles and china from the 18th and 19th centuries in both England and France. The fable was also among the miniatures commissioned from the Punjabi court painter Imam Baksh Lahori in 1837 by a French enthusiast but shows no originality of treatment.

French composers have set the text of La Fontaine's Le petit poisson et le pêcheur. They include René Falquet (1934–); Dominique Preschez (1954–), whose Trois fables en une for small orchestra and soprano (1995) includes it as the third of the set; and Alexandros Markeas (1965–) whose La Fontaine des malchanceux is for narrator, children's choir and orchestra (2005/6).
