= Odo of Cheriton =

English preacher and fabulist

Odo of Cheriton (1180/1190 – 1246/47) was an English preacher and fabulist who spent a considerable time studying in Paris and then lecturing in the south of France and in northern Spain.

== Life and background ==
Odo belonged to a Norman family which had settled in Kent and were named from their manor at Cheriton. He, however, was brought up at the family's new manor on the other side of the county in Farningham. His father William had been a crusader with Richard Coeur de Lion and then added to the family's fortunes as a supporter of King John. His son Odo studied at the University of Paris, where he had gained the degree of Master (Magister) by 1211, after which he was granted custody of the church at Cheriton. There is uncertainty whether his degree was in theology, but by the end of the decade he was describing himself as Doctor Ecclesiae (doctor of the church) when his popular sermons on the Sunday Gospels were completed in 1219. There is evidence that many of these were preached in France. He also seems familiar with the dangers of going on pilgrimage, giving advice there on drugged drinks, dishonest hosts, avaricious Hospitallers, robbers and hostile villagers.

During the next few years Odo visited the south of France and also lectured at the short-lived university in Palencia. After it closed, he moved to the University of Salamanca. In 1233 he returned to England, having inherited his father's widely dispersed estates. On one of the documents concerning property from this period appears Odo's seal, an impress of St Odo of Cluny seated at a desk beneath a canopy with a star in the right-hand corner above, in reference to his namesake, after whom his grandfather was also named. Following his death in 1246/7 he was buried in Rochester Cathedral and his brother Waleran inherited his lands.

== Works ==
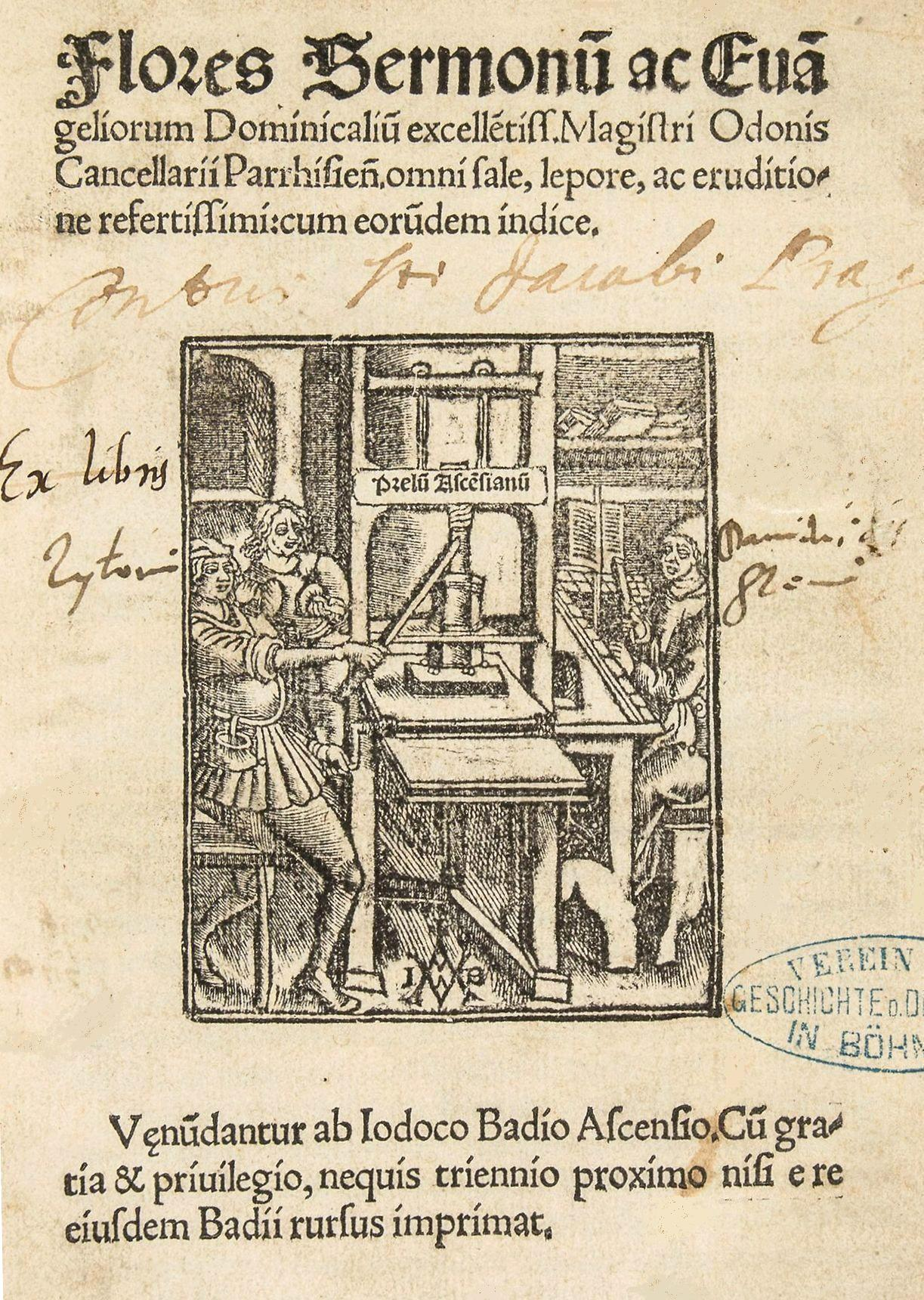
The only printed edition of Odo's sermons, Paris 1520

Beside the 64 sermons on the Sunday Gospels, of which extracts were published under the title Flores Sermonum ac Evangeliorum Dominicalium in Paris in 1520, Odo had composed early treatises on the Lord's Prayer and the Passion. In 1224 he compiled another collection of sermons (Sermones Dominicales in Epistolas), many of which were preached in Spain, where he was also credited with an exposition of the Song of Songs (1226/7). About the same time he compiled a further set of sermons on Feast Days (Sermones de Festis). His final religious work, written about 1235, after his return to England, was a handbook for priests on penitence.

The work for which Odo is best known, however, was a collection of moralized fables and anecdotes, sometimes titled Parabolæ from the opening words of the prologue (Aperiam in parabolis os meum), which was evidently designed for preachers. Though partly composed of commonly known adaptations and extracts, it shows originality of interpretation and the moralisations are full of pungent denunciations of the prevalent vices of clergy and laity. The collection contains some 117 fables and variants, twenty-six of them from Aesop's Fables, others taken from the Roman writers Seneca, Ovid and Juvenal, from the Bible and from English folktales, as well as from his Mediaeval near-contemporaries Petrus Alphonsi, Jacques de Vitry and Stephen of Bourbon. It exists in numerous manuscripts and the work was published by Léopold Hervieux in 1896. A thirteenth-century French version is extant, as is a 14th-century Welsh version called Chwedlau Odo ("Odo's Tales") and an early Spanish translation.

The primary purpose of the Parabolæ was to provide examples of right and wrong conduct for use in sermons. Odo's interpretations sometimes verge on the satirical and he does not spare his own kind, condemnation of the behaviour of the Cistercians being particularly pointed. On account of this it used to be speculated that he was a member of that order himself, but there is no evidence that he ever belonged to any order. Some of the parallels drawn in his work tell no story but contain the kind of lore found in Mediaeval bestiaries. One section states baldly that "A wild colt throws himself into the water or into a pit unless he is held back by a bridle". What follows becomes a commentary on the need for discipline in order to escape the pains of Hell (Fable 56). Again, the information that the eagle trains its chicks to gaze at the sun, throwing out of the nest any who cannot manage this, is made the occasion for an exhortation to aspire to heavenly contemplation (Fable 17). It has also been observed that, in contrast to Marie de France's interest in hierarchic relations in her Ysopet, which privileges the 'noble' animals, there is a broader range of the humbler domestic creatures in Odo.

== Sources ==
- Full text of the Flores Sermonum ac Evangeliorum Domenicalium (1st printed edition, 1520) at Google (page views)
- Albert C. Friend, "Master Odo of Cheriton", Speculum (University of Chicago) Vol. 23, Oct., 1948, pp. 641–658
- John C. Jacobs, The Fables of Odo of Cheriton, Syracuse University 1985
- Joyce E. Salisbury, « Human animals of Medieval fables » in Animals in the Middle Ages, Routledge 2016, pp. 49–65
- Le favole di Oddone di Cheriton. A cura di Valentina Piro, Firenze, SISMEL · Edizioni del Galluzzo, 2023
