= Hieronymus Osius =

German Neo-Latin poet and academic

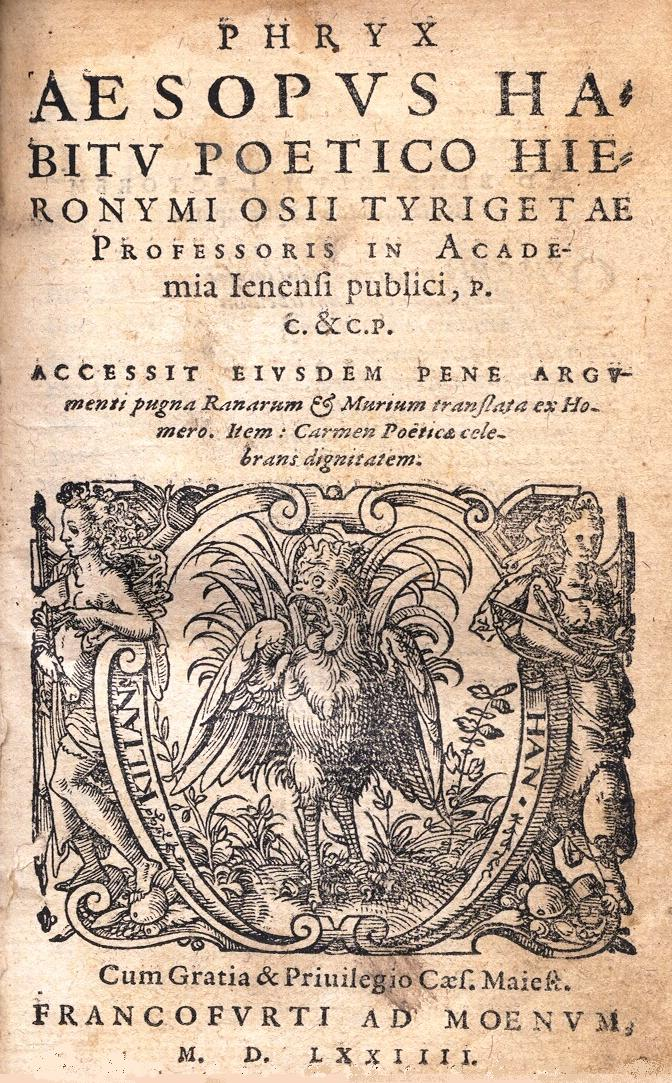
The title page of the 1574 edition of Aesop's Fables by Osius

Hieronymus Osius was a German Neo-Latin poet and academic about whom there are few biographical details. He was born about 1530 in Schlotheim and murdered in 1575 in Graz. After studying first at the university of Erfurt, he gained his master's degree from Wittenberg University in 1552 and later lectured on Poetics in the Philosophical faculty there. In 1558 he was crowned poet laureate in Copenhagen by King Christian III of Denmark. Thereafter he held teaching positions in Jena, Regensburg and Graz, identifying with Protestantism in the religious conflicts of the time. Osius was known as a pre-eminent poet whose works were frequently reprinted. They included his "Song on Christ’s Birth" (Carmen de natali Christi, 1557); an adaptation into Latin of the Homeric comic epic, the Batrachomyomachia (Pugna ranarum et murium, the battle of the frogs and mice); an epic of the Dithmarschen Peasants’ War (Historia belli Ditmarsici, 1560), which had only recently concluded and of which he also published a shorter version in German; and his collection of nearly 300 poems based on Aesop’s Fables (Fabulae Aesopi carmine elegiaco redditae, 1564).
