= Frans Hogenberg =

Flemish-German painter and engraver (1535–1590)

- Born: 1535; Mechelen
- Died: 1590 (aged 54–55); Cologne

Frans Hogenberg (1535–1590) was a Flemish-German painter, engraver, and mapmaker.

== Life ==
Hogenberg was born in Mechelen in Flanders as the son of Nicolaas Hogenberg. In 1568, he was banned from Antwerp by the Duke of Alba because he was a protestant and had printed engravings sympathizing with the Beeldenstorm. He travelled to London, where he stayed a few years before emigrating to Cologne. He is known for portraits and topographical views as well as historical allegories. He also produced scenes of contemporary historical events.

Hogenberg died in Cologne.

== Selected works ==
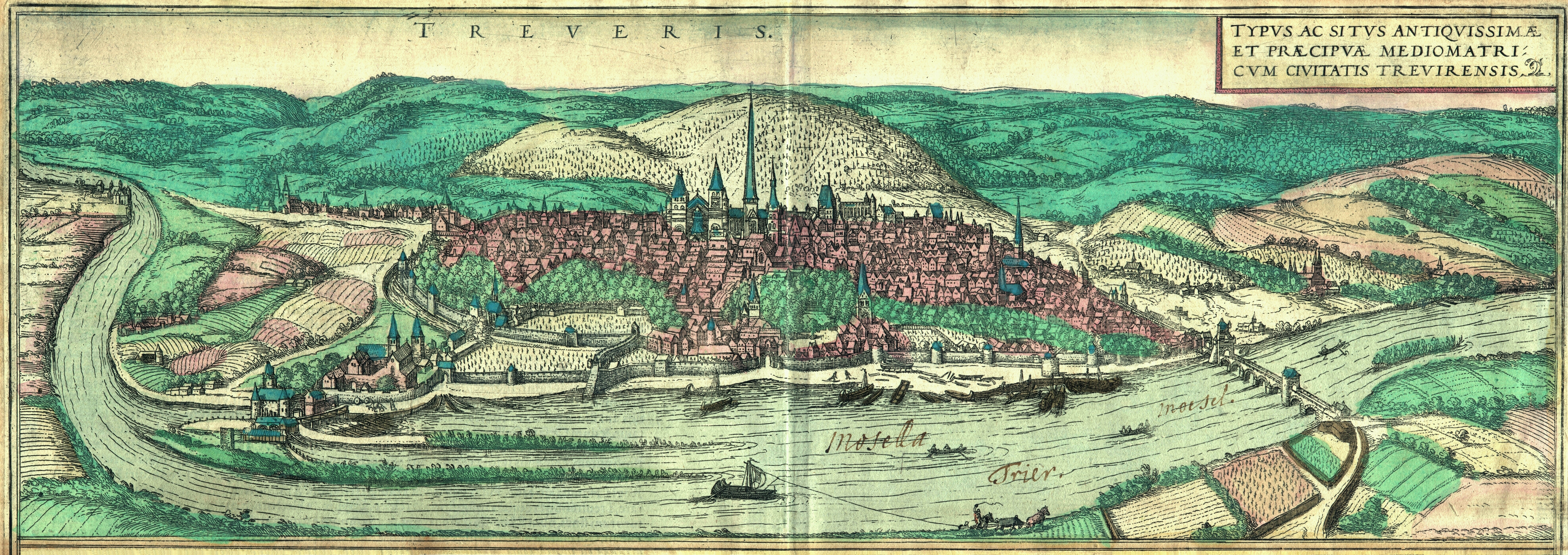
Historical view of Trier, Germany, published in Civitates Orbis Terrarum with Georg Braun

- Theatrum orbis terrarum - collaboration with Abraham Ortelius, 1565
- Civitates Orbis Terrarum - collaboration with his son Abraham and Georg Braun, 1572. This collection of maps across Europe is the most important book of town plans and views published in the 16th century. Hogenberg engraved the majority of the maps in the book and George Braun wrote the text and acquired source material for the books. There were six volumes of the book published.

== Gallery ==
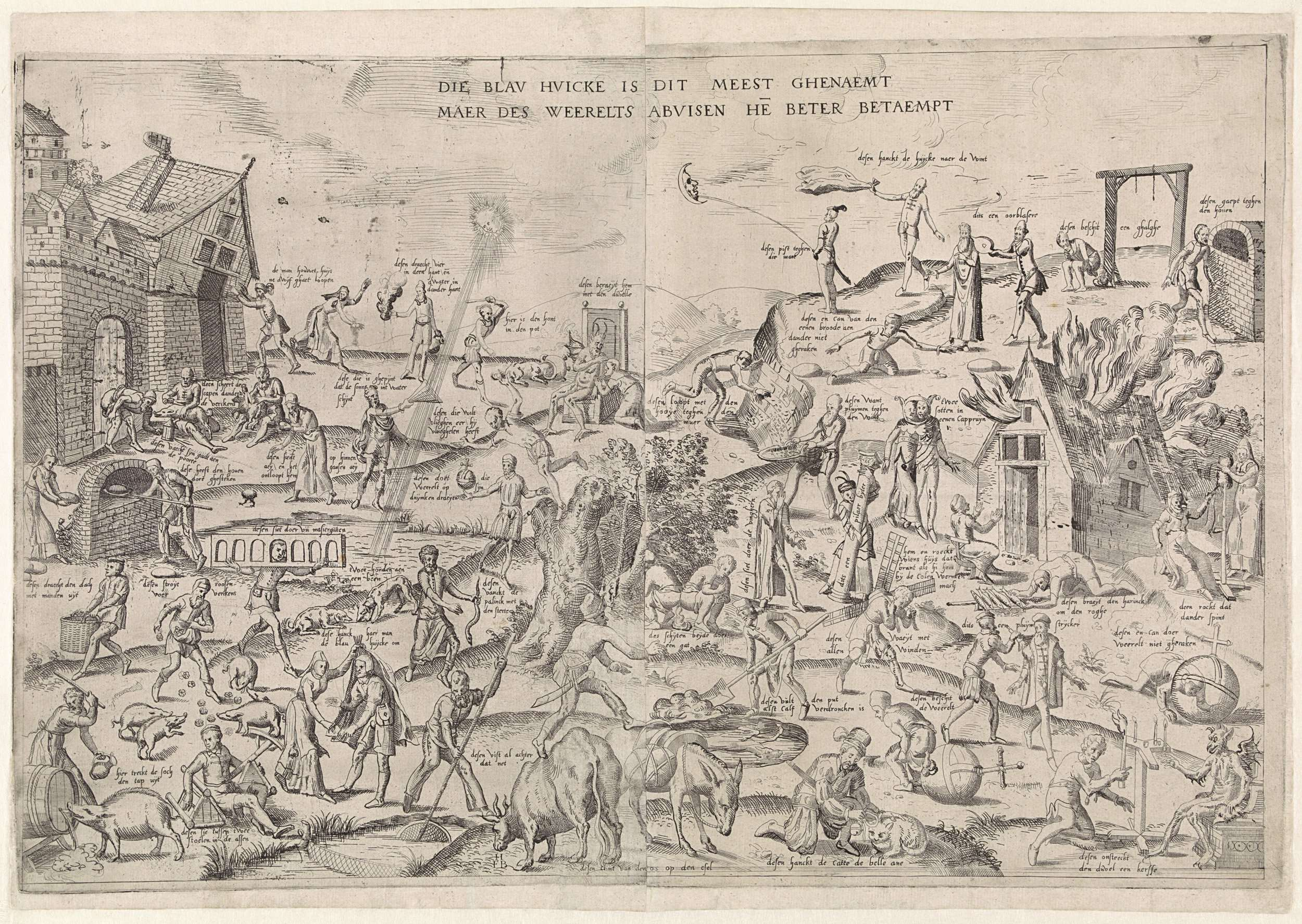
The Blue Cloak. Some say this 1558 engraving, with proverbs written above the figures, formed the basis for Breughel's Netherlandish Proverbs painting

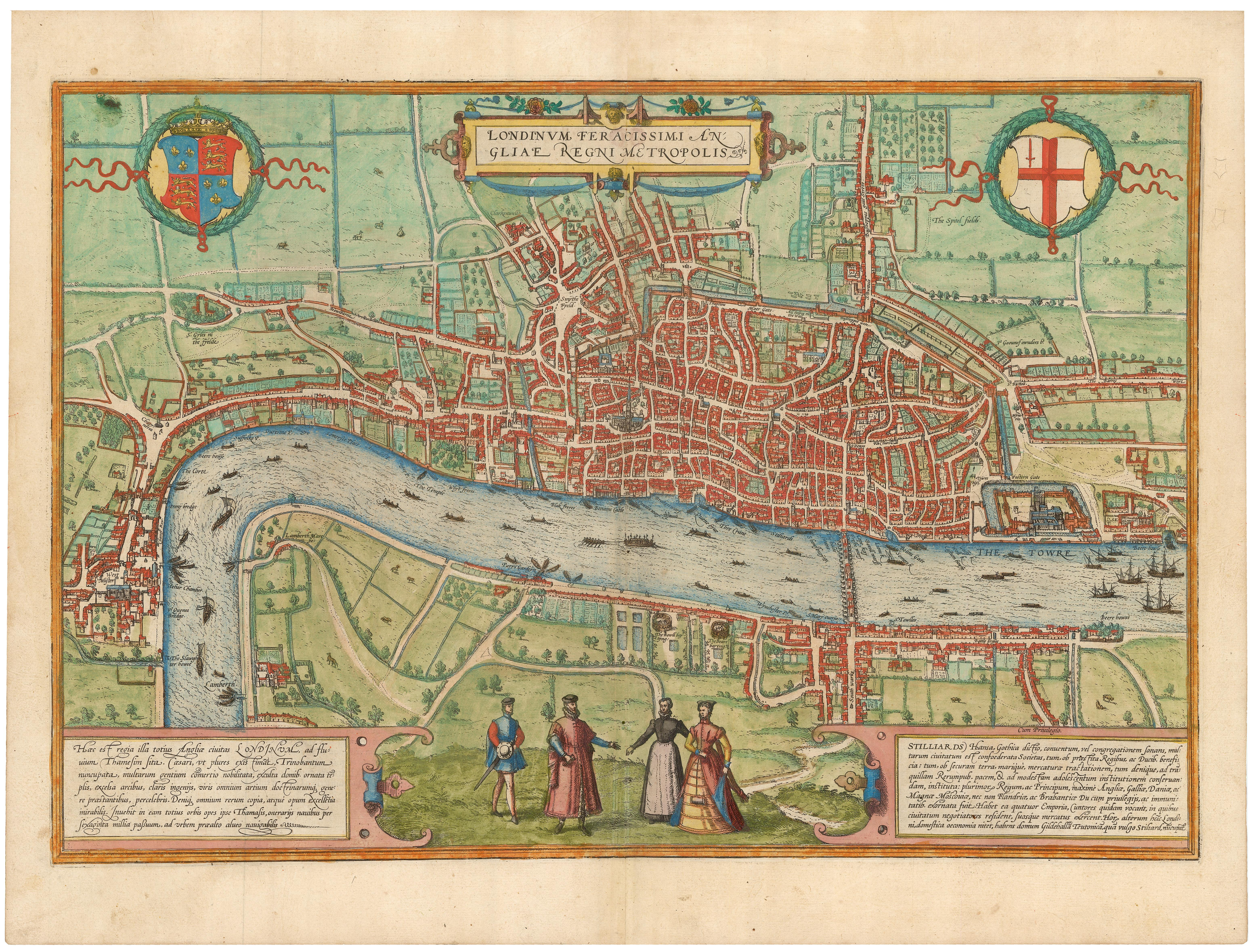
Londinum Feracissimi Angliae Regni Metropolis (1575)

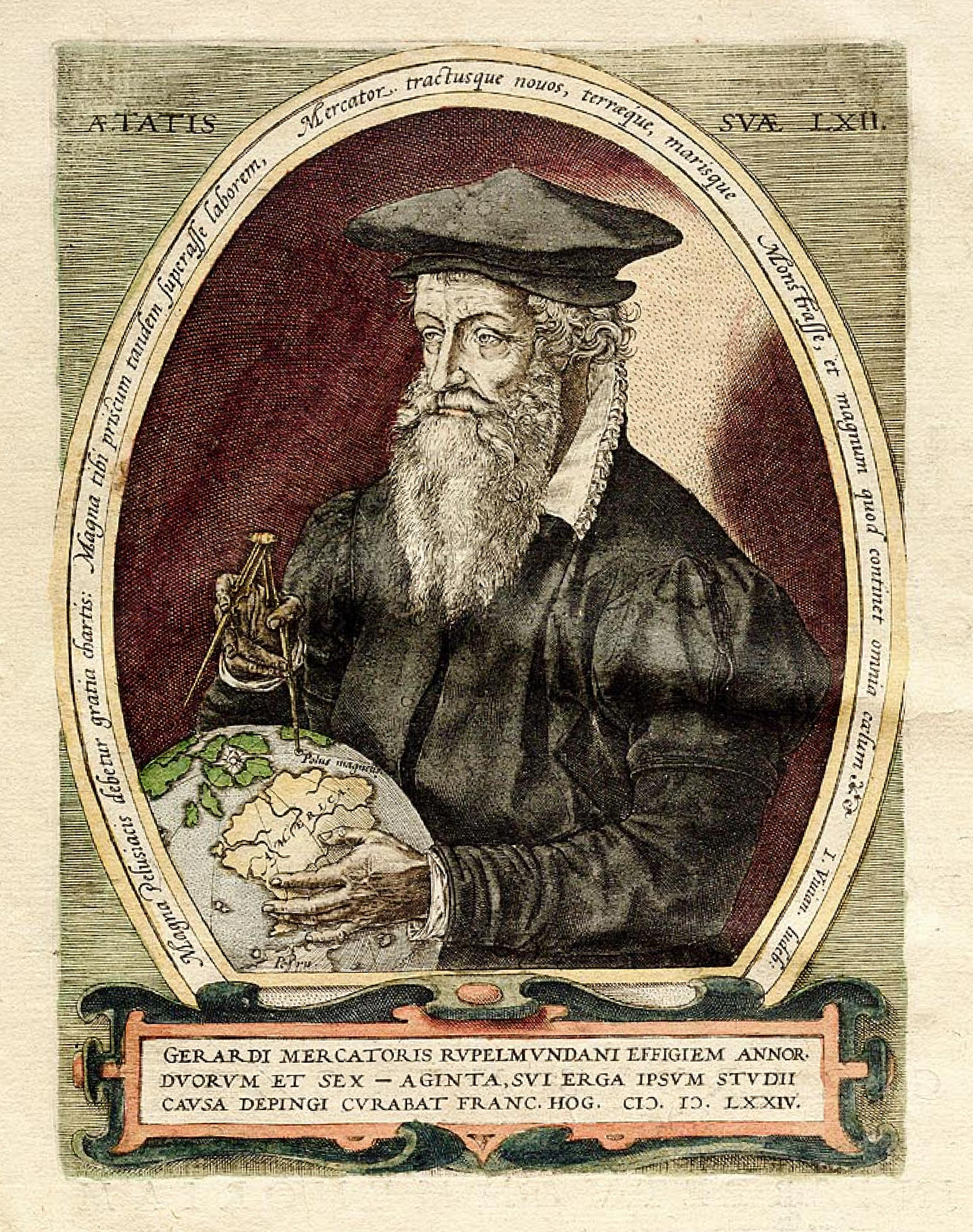
Detail: Portrait of Gerardus Mercator (1574)

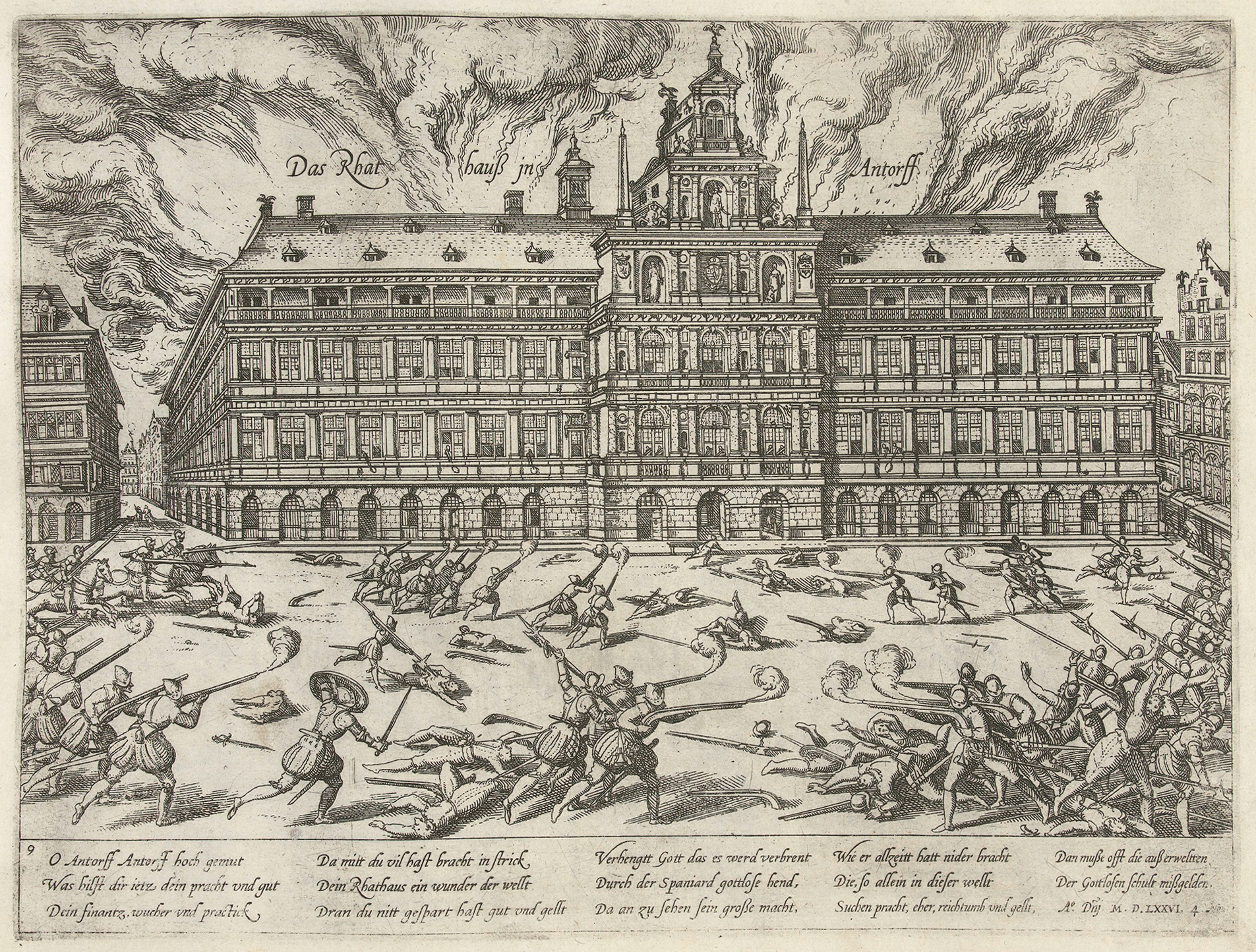
Mutinous troops of the Army of Flanders ransack the Grote Markt during the Sack of Antwerp (engraving of 1576).

== See also ==
- Junkersdorf Massacre (an incident outside Cologne that Hogenberg illustrated)
