= Aliboron =

Scientific classification
- Domain: Eukaryota
- Kingdom: Animalia
- Phylum: Arthropoda
- Class: Insecta
- Order: Coleoptera
- Suborder: Polyphaga
- Infraorder: Cucujiformia
- Family: Cerambycidae
- Tribe: Agapanthiini
- Genus: Aliboron

Genus of beetles

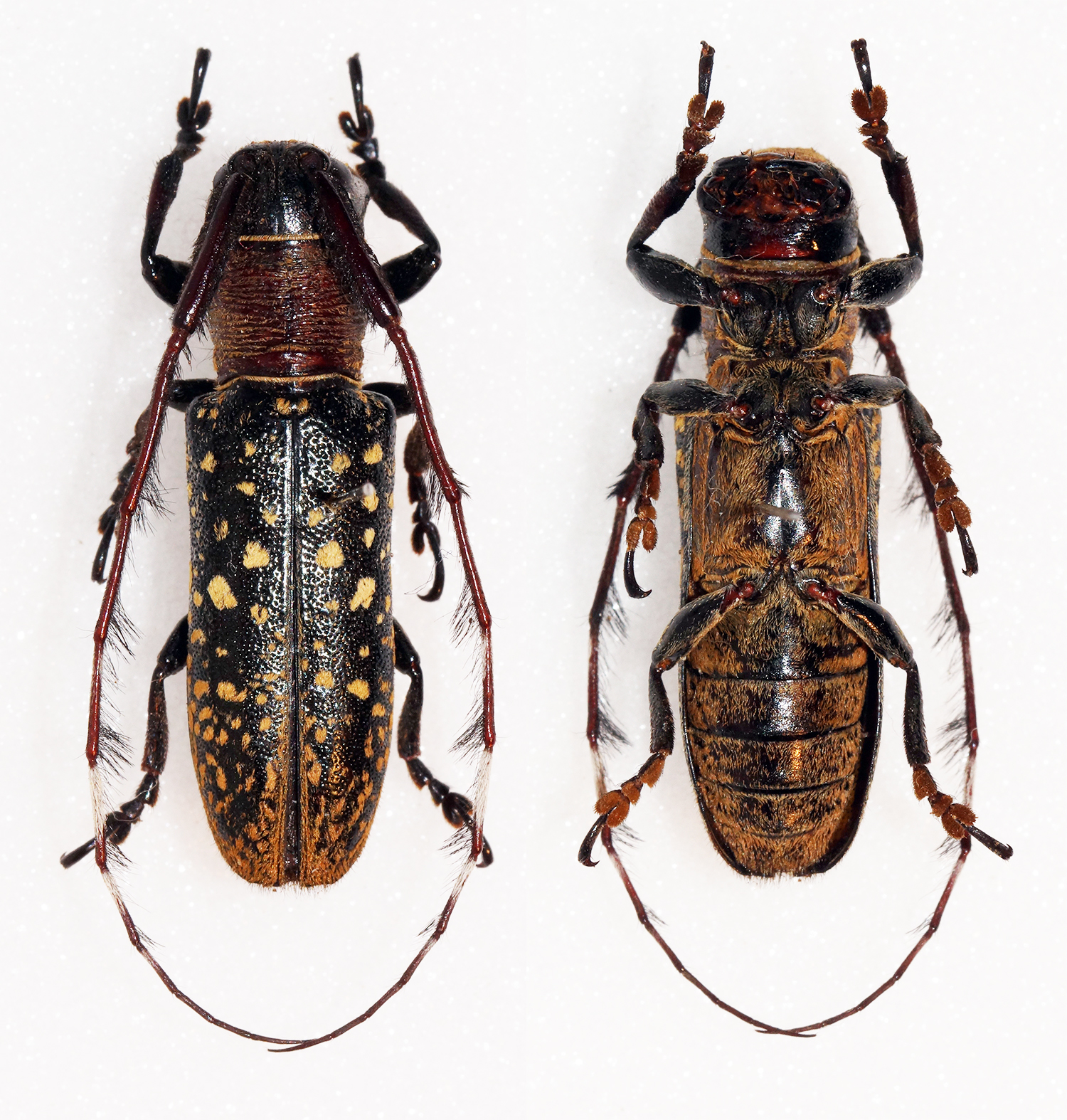

Aliboron is a genus of beetles in the family Cerambycidae, containing the following species:

- Aliboron antennatum J. Thomson, 1864
- Aliboron bukidnoni Vives, 2005
- Aliboron granulatum Breuning, 1966
- Aliboron laosense Breuning, 1968
- Aliboron wongi Hüdepohl, 1987

== Etymology ==
The genus was named by James Thomson in 1864; the type species is Aliboron antennatum.

The name Aliboron is that of the donkey in La Fontaine's fable "The thieves and the ass" (Les voleurs et l’âne, I.13); from La Fontaine the word aliboron entered French as a generic name for a donkey (compare Reynard). The name "Maistre Aliboron" for an ass has been suggested to originate from:

- black hellebore, used in medicines, thus perhaps for panaceas, and thus perhaps for (quack) doctors;
- Al-Biruni (973–1048), a Persian philosopher;
- the Latin phrase magister aliborum, "master of alibis."

In 1910, Roland Dorgelès tied a paintbrush to a donkey's tail and exhibited the resulting artwork at the Société des Artistes Indépendants under the name Boronali (an anagram of "Aliboron").
