= The Lion, the Bear and the Fox =

Aesop's fable

The Lion, the Bear and the Fox is one of Aesop's Fables that is numbered 147 in the Perry Index. There are similar story types of both eastern and western origin in which two disputants lose the object of their dispute to a third.

== Western versions and variants ==
There are ancient Greek versions of the fable, and it was included in the Medici Manuscript collection of Aesop's fables dating from the 1470s. However, its earliest appearance in another language is as number 60 in the collection of 150 fables in Latin verse by the Austrian poet Pantaleon Candidus (1604). Here, a lion and a bear simultaneously attack a fawn and fight over it until they collapse from fatigue. Then a fox that has been watching them snatches their prey and makes off with it. The moral Pantaleon draws at the end is Saepe alter alterius fruitur labribus (from the labours of others it is often another who profits). The story seems to have entered printed collections of Aesop's fables from this source. In his 1692 retelling, Sir Roger L'Estrange anglicizes the conclusion as 'Tis the Fate of all Gotham Quarrels, when Fools go together by the Ears, to have Knaves run away with the Stakes'.

Earlier European versions of this type of story feature two other animals fighting over a find or their prey, only to have a third come and steal it. One of the earliest in English is referred to briefly in Geoffrey Chaucer's The Knight's Tale (1490):

We strive as did the two hounds for the bone,
They fought all day, and yet their part was none;
There came a kite by, while that they were wrath,
And bore away the bone between them both. (CT 1177–80)

The situation was proverbial and expressed alternatively in English as "While two dogs are fighting for a bone, a third runs away with it". Its Dutch equivalent, Als twee honden vechten om een been, loopt de derde om mee heen, was among those illustrated in Pieter Bruegel the Elder's Netherlandish Proverbs (1559).

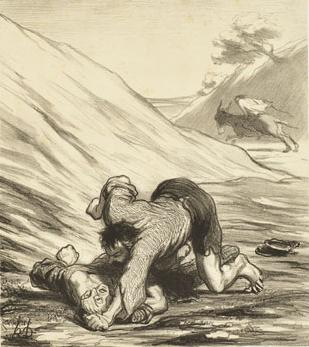
Honoré Victorin Daumier: Lithograph of La Fontaine's fable, "The Ass and the Two Thieves", 1863

La Fontaine's Fables transformed the story into Les voleurs et l'âne (I.13). There two thieves fight over the question of whether to keep or sell a stolen donkey, only to have another thief ride it off while they are doing so. La Fontaine draws a political moral, likening the dispute to a contemporary war between Hungary and Turkey over the province of Transylvania. In the Walloon dialect imitation made by François Bailleux in 1851, Lès voleûrs èt l'ågne, that author likens the dispute between the thieves to two lovers fighting over a girl while a third has his way with her.

Ambrose Bierce also reinterpreted the story in the "Old Saws with New Teeth" section of his Fantastic Fables (1899):

Two Thieves, having stolen a Piano and being unable to divide it fairly without a remainder, went to law about it and continued the contest as long as either one could steal a dollar to bribe the judge. When they could give no more an Honest Man came along and by a single small payment obtained a judgment and took the Piano home, where his daughter used it to develop her biceps muscles, becoming a famous pugiliste.

Bierce takes the hint for the conduct of his 'honest man' from Samuel Croxall's Fables of Aesop and others: translated into English with instructive applications (1722 and often reissued). The 'application' for the fable of "The Lion, the Bear and the Fox" reflects on the foolishness of applying to lawyers in disputes over property: 'When people go to law about an uncertain title, and have spent their whole estates in the contest, nothing is more common than for some little pettifogging attorney to step in, and secure it to himself.' Thomas Bewick indicates the same moral in his illustrated Select Fables of Aesop (1784). There the preface to Fable 20, titled "The Lion, the Tyger and the Fox", warns that 'The intemperate rage of clients gives the lawyer an opportunity of seizing the property in dispute'.

== Eastern variations ==
Just as the story of the dogs who lost everything while fighting over a bone became proverbial in England, the Indian proverbial equivalent is expressed as 'monkey's justice'. The story to which it refers is of two cats who fight over a piece of bread, or butter or cheese, and go before a monkey to adjudicate their shares. He cuts it into two unequal halves and has to nibble first one then the other to get them equal until the cats beg him to stop; claiming it as his fee, the monkey gobbles the remainder and leaves them nothing. A Hungarian folktale with much the same plot concerns two bears quarrelling over the division of a cheese and applying to a fox for adjudication. It was the subject of a Russian animated short in 1954 and an English language retelling in 1998.

The Indian fable involves the same distrust of lawyers as in the West and it is this parallel that is underlined in some European literary retellings. One of the earliest examples appears in Antoine Houdar de la Motte's Nouvelles Fables, an English translation of which followed in 1721. Soon after, Allan Ramsay used it as the basis for his poem in Scots dialect, "The twa cats and the cheese". The same story reappears in Alfred de Saint-Quentin's poem in Guyanese creole, Dé Chat ké Makak (The Two Cats and the Monkey) and also makes an early English appearance in Jefferys Taylor's Aesop in Rhyme.

A much earlier Indian variation on the story appears in the Buddhist scriptures as the Dabbhapuppha Jataka. Here a jackal offers to arbitrate between two otters who are quarrelling over the division of a fish they have co-operated in bringing to land. The jackal awards them the head and tail and runs off with the bulk of their catch. The moral drawn is a political one:

Just as when strife arises among men,
They seek an arbiter: he's leader then,
Their wealth decays and the king's coffers gain.

The story has obvious affinities with the fable of the Lion's Share and the similar political moral drawn from it by some commentators. It has been applied particularly to the troubles of India under the English colonial regime and later by Gandhi to the troubles arising from the partition of India in 1947.

== Artistic interpretations ==
The fable of "The Lion, the Bear and the Fox" figured as one of a series in the Copeland and Garrett period of late Spode pottery between 1830–79. The designs for these were taken from the illustrations in the 1793 edition of the Rev. Samuel Croxall's Fables of Aesop.

Honoré Daumier made an oil painting of La Fontaine's fable (c. 1858–60) which is on display in the Musée d'Orsay. It is based on a lithograph of street fighters which appeared in Le Charivari on 23 August 1845, the preliminary drawing for which is also in the same museum. The painter emphasises the fight between the thieves in the foreground, standing out against the over-all dark colouring, while in the background, hidden in the shadows, the flight of the third thief on the ass is roughly sketched in. Among other 19th century French artists who have treated the subject are François Chifflart and Paul Cézanne. The former features two thieves fighting in the lower foreground of a wide landscape, with the third galloping towards a path up the distant cliffs. Cézanne's later painting (1879/80) has a group of four thieves struggling in one corner of a dynamic seaside landscape over which loom cliffs and pines; the ass is peaceably wandering downhill towards two seated characters, one of whom is smoking.

The French fable has also been set for choir performance by Georges Moineau (b. 1914).
