= Joannes van Doetecum the Elder =

Dutch engraver

Joannes van Doetecum I
- Born: 1530; Deventer
- Died: 1605 (aged 74–75)

Joannes van Doetecum the Elder (1530 – 1605) was a Dutch engraver-cartographer known for his etched works after genre scenes by Pieter Bruegel the Elder and maps of various cities in the Netherlands.

He was born in Deventer and moved to Haarlem in 1578. He was the father of Johannes II, Peter and Baptista, and was the brother of Lucas van Doetecum, with whom he collaborated on many print series.

== Works ==
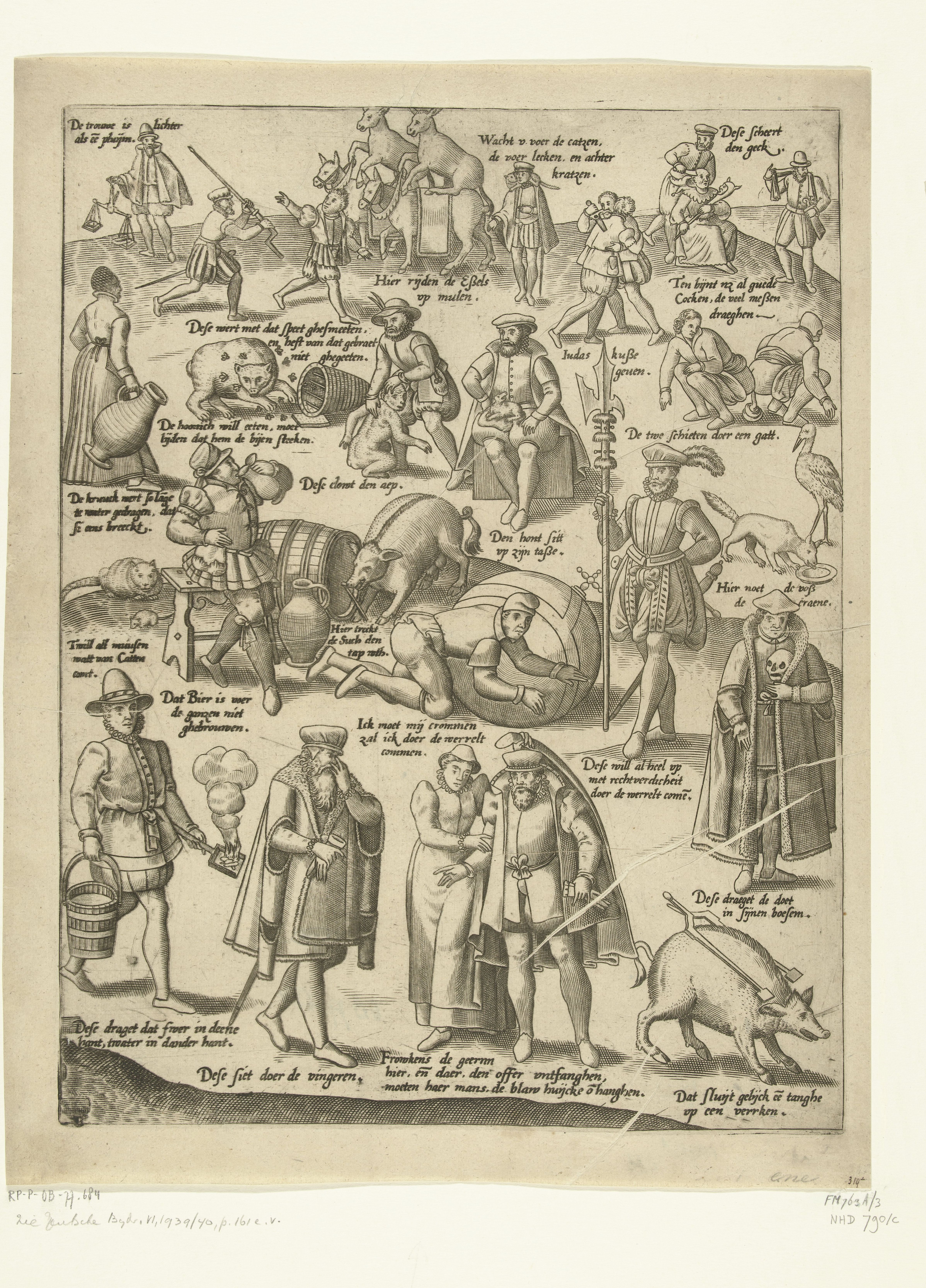
The Blue Cloak, before or after Pieter Brueghel the Elder

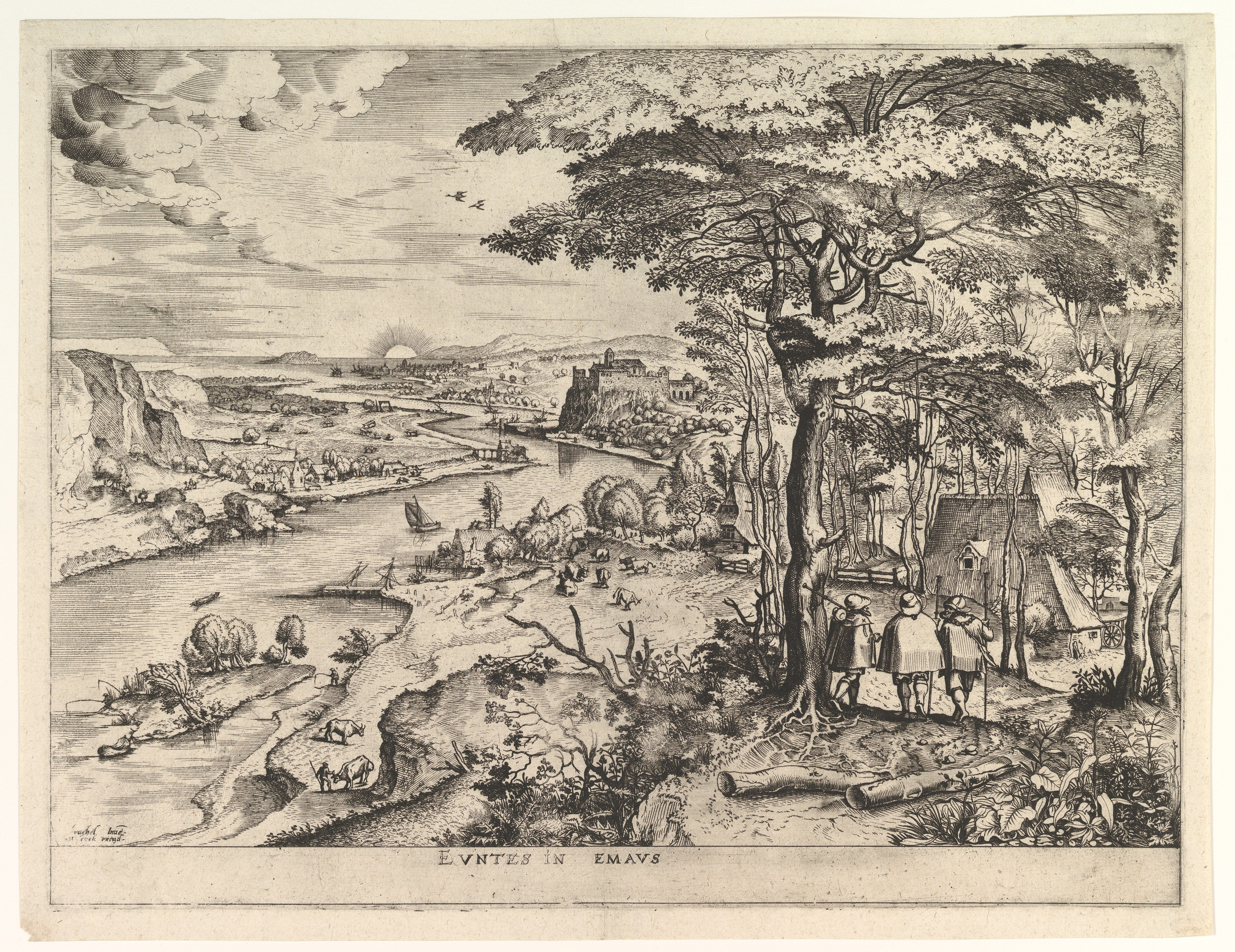
Landscape with Pilgrims at Emmaus, after Pieter Brueghel the Elder

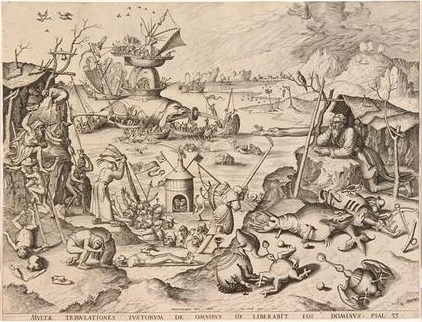
Temptation of Saint Anthony, after Jheronimus Bosch
