= Barzy-sur-Marne =

- Commune
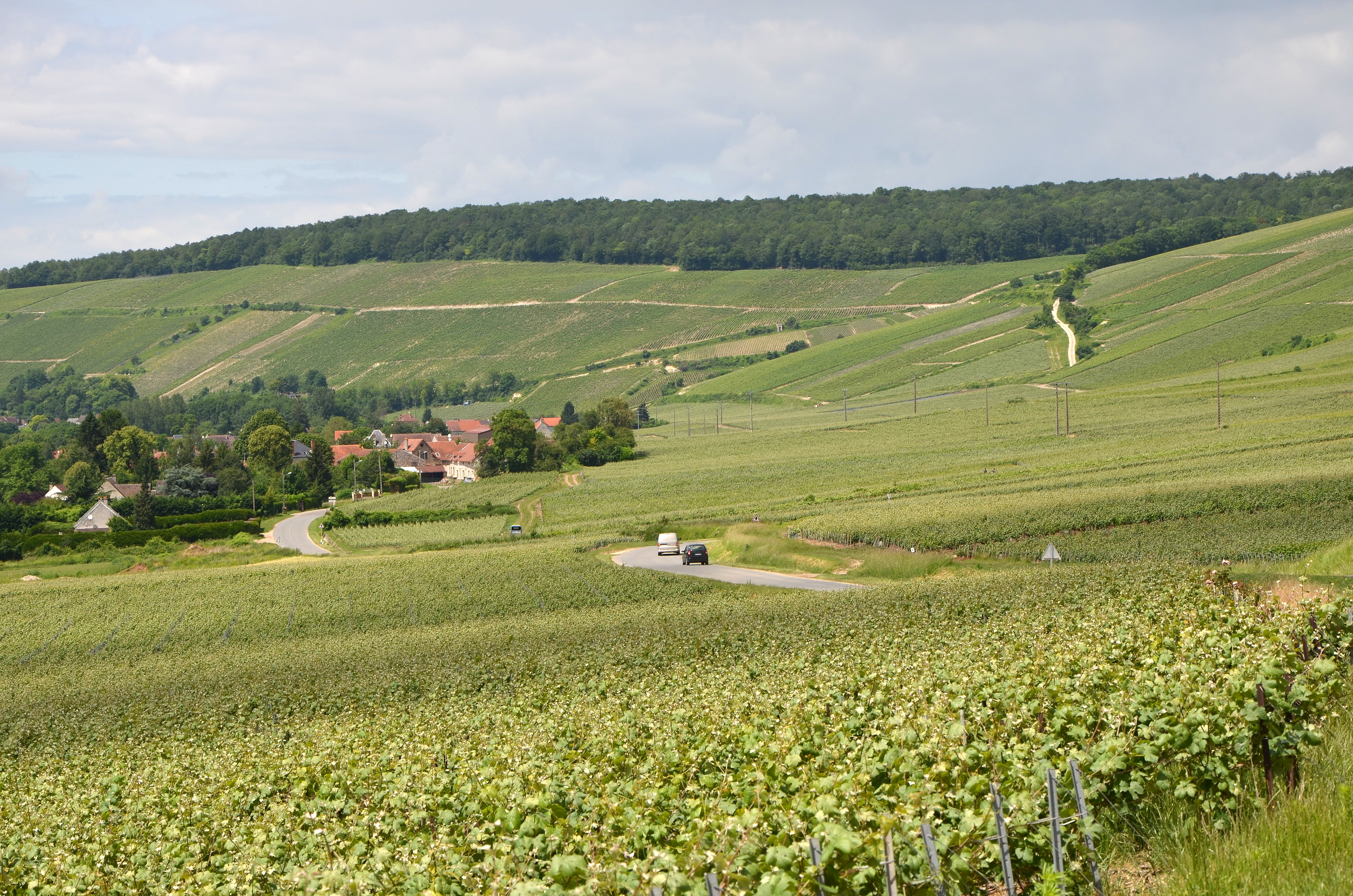
- Hamlet of Rosay
- Location of Barzy-sur-Marne
- Location within France Location within Hauts-de-France
- Coordinates: 49°04′51″N 3°33′36″E
- Country: France
- Region: Hauts-de-France
- Department: Aisne
- Arrondissement: Château-Thierry
- Canton: Essômes-sur-Marne
- Intercommunality: CA Région de Château-Thierry

Government
  - Mayor (2026–32): Thierry Solarczyk
- Area^{1}: 7.55 km^{2} (2.92 sq mi)
- Elevation: 63 m (207 ft)
- Highest elevation: 231 m (758 ft)
- Lowest elevation: 62 m (203 ft)
- Population (2023): 380
  - Density: 50/km^{2} (130/sq mi)
- Time zone: UTC+01:00 (CET)
  - Summer (DST): UTC+02:00 (CEST)
- INSEE/Postal code: 02051 /02850
- ^{1} French Land Register data, which excludes lakes, ponds, glaciers > 1 km^{2} (0.386 sq mi or 247 acres) and river estuaries.

Barzy-sur-Marne (French pronunciation: [baʁzi syʁ maʁn], literally Barzy on Marne) is a commune in the department of Aisne in the Hauts-de-France region of northern France.

== Geography ==
Barzy-sur-Marne is located some 15 km east by northeast of Château-Thierry and 35 km southwest of Rheims. It can be accessed on the D320 road from Jaulgonne in the west passing through the commune and the village curving south to Passy-sur-Marne. Apart from the village there are two hamlets: Marcilly, and Rosay both located on the D320 road. Some 70% of the commune in the north is heavily forested with the balance consisting of farmland.

The western border of the commune is formed by the Marne river which flows from the south curving west. One small stream south of the village flows into the Marne.

The commune lies within the Appellation d'origine contrôlée (AOC) zone for "Champagne of Aisne".

== History ==
In the 16th century, the people depended on the Duchess of Vendôme. The three separate hamlets composing the village had once each had a port on the Marne to transport stone.

In 1923, the capital of the commune of Barzy-sur-Marne was transferred from Barzy-sur-Marne to the hamlet of Marcilly, which became the capital of the commune. However, this transfer was done without changing the name of the commune, following the Decree of 23 October 1923.

== Population ==
Historical population
Year	Pop.	±% p.a.
1968	231	—
1975	248	+1.02%
1982	316	+3.52%
1990	359	+1.61%
1999	356	−0.09%
2007	380	+0.82%
2012	385	+0.26%
2017	384	−0.05%
2023	380	−0.17%
Source: INSEE

== Sites and Monuments ==
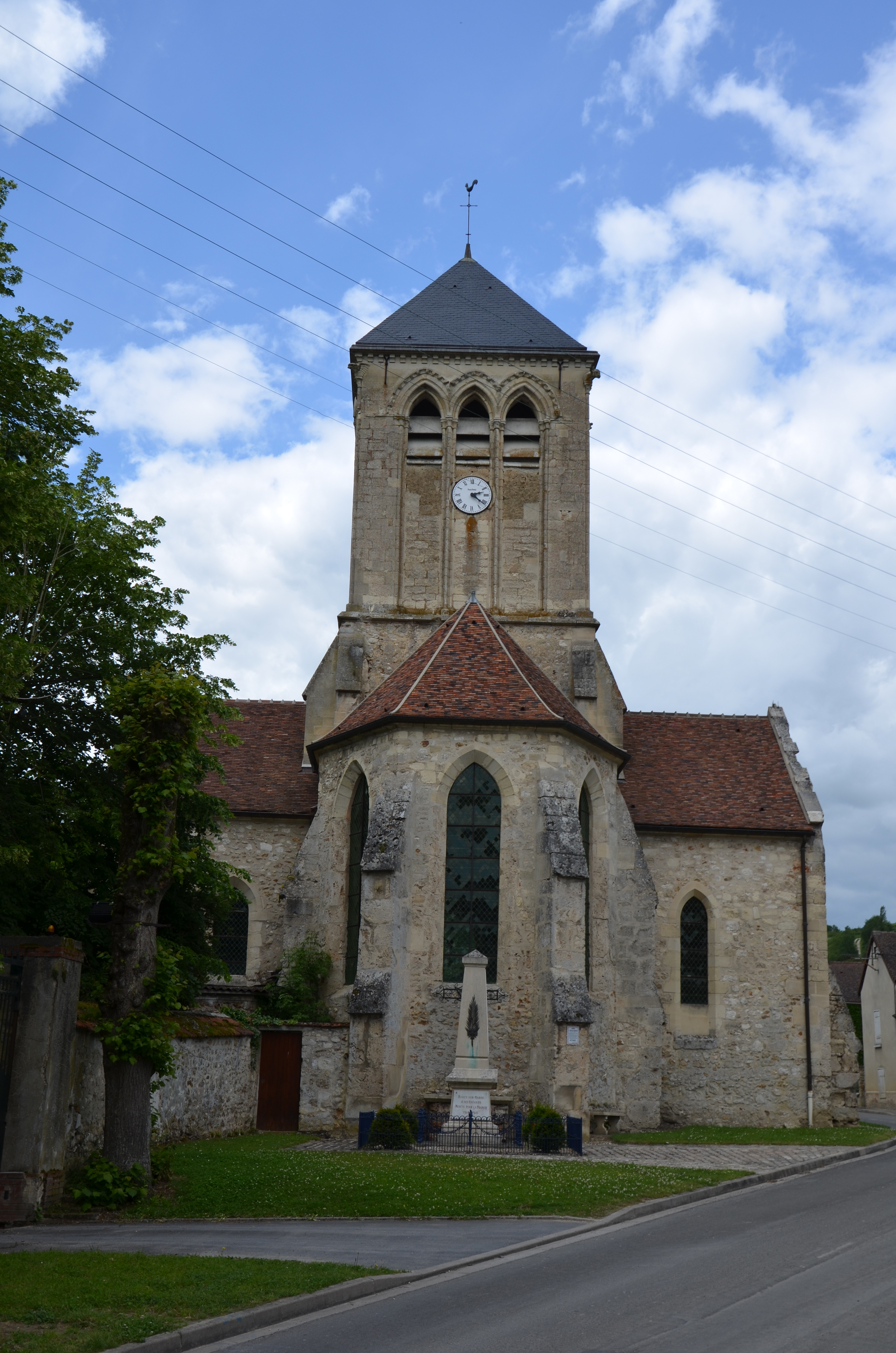
The Saint Eloi church

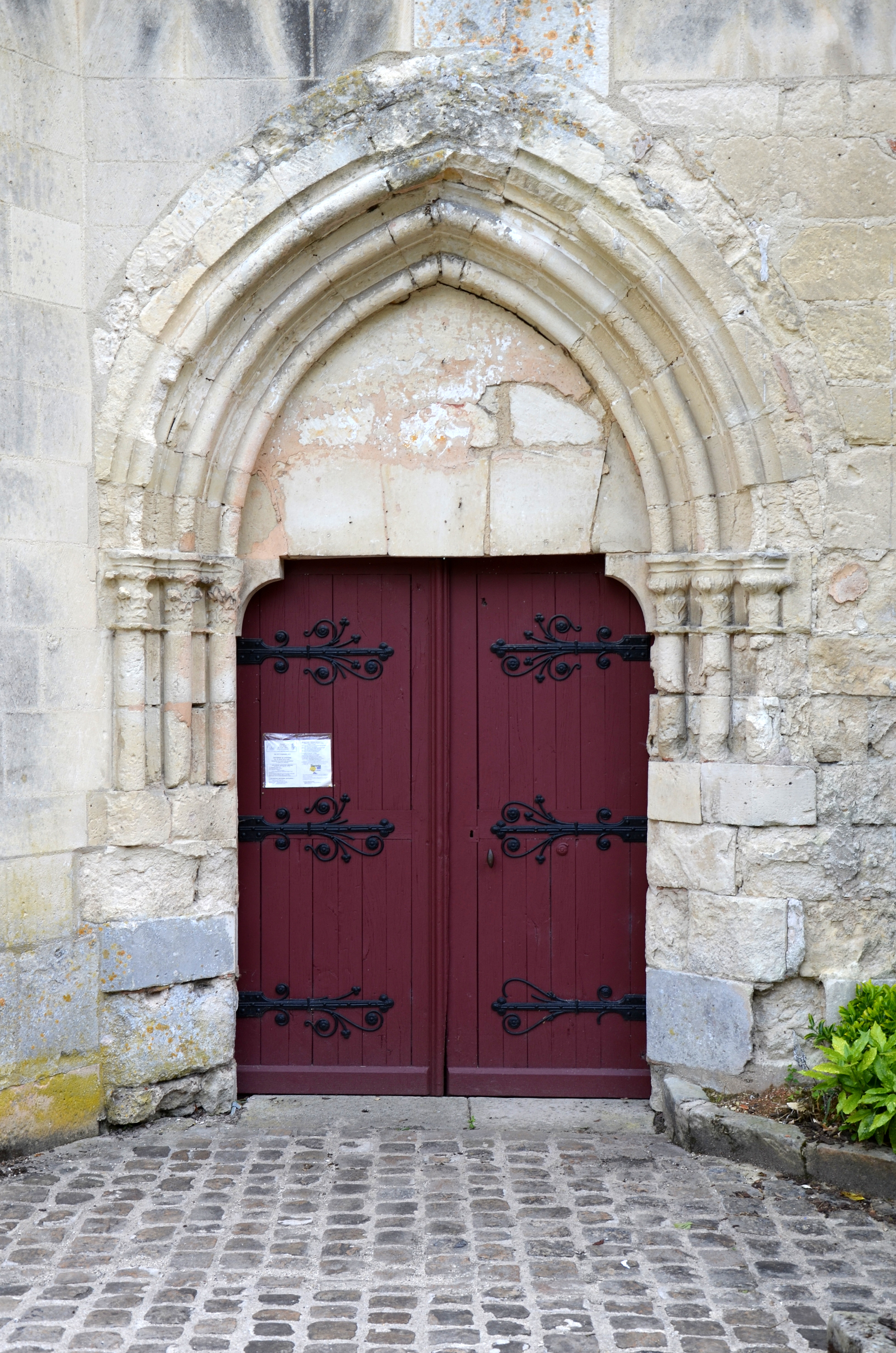
Entrance to the church

The commune has two sites that are registered as historical monuments:

- The Chateau Park at 50 Rue Saint-Eloi
- The Church of Saint Eloi (13th century)

=== Other sites of interest ===
- A Lavoir (Public laundry)
- An illustration of the fable The Fox and the Stork in the village square at Barzy-sur-Marne

== See also ==
- Communes of the Aisne department
