= Lion's share =

Idiom which refers to the major share of something

The lion's share is an idiomatic expression which now refers to the major share of something. The phrase derives from the plot of a number of fables ascribed to Aesop and is used here as their generic title. There are two main types of story, which exist in several different versions. Other fables exist in the East that feature division of prey in such a way that the divider gains the greater part - or even the whole. In English, the phrase used in the sense of nearly all only appeared at the end of the 18th century; the French equivalent, le partage du lion, is recorded from the start of that century, following La Fontaine's version of the fable.

== The Phaedrus version ==
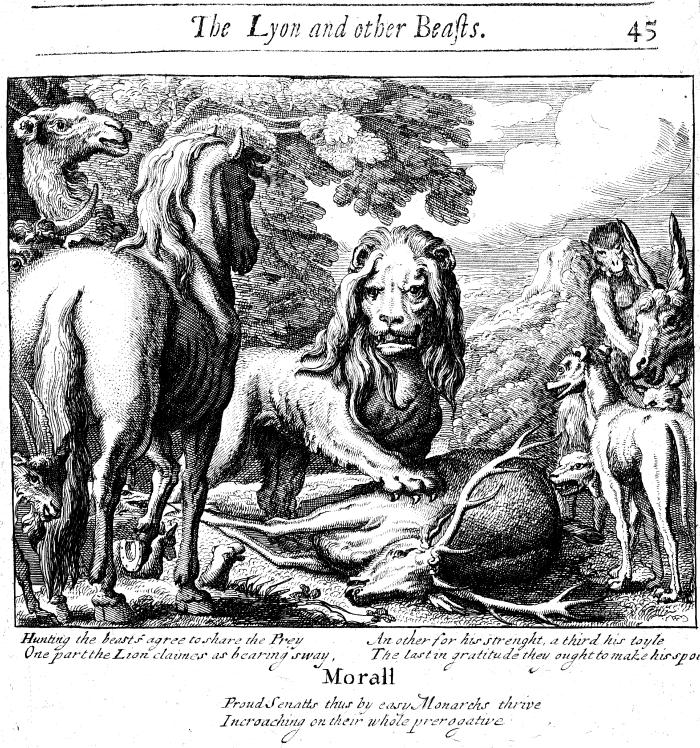
Illustration of the fable from Francis Barlow's edition of Aesop's Fables, 1687

The early Latin version of Phaedrus begins with the reflection that "Partnership with the mighty is never trustworthy". It then relates how a cow, a goat and a sheep go hunting together with a lion. When it comes to dividing the spoil, the lion says, "I take the first portion because of my title, since I am addressed as king; the second portion you will assign to me, since I'm your partner; then because I am the stronger, the third will follow me; and an accident will happen to anyone who touches the fourth." This was listed as Fable 339 in the Perry Index and was later the version followed by William Caxton in his 1484 collection of the Fables.

The number of differing variations circulating by the time of the Middle Ages is witnessed by the fact that Marie de France included two in her 12th century Ysopet. Both appear under the title "The Lion Goes Hunting" (De Leone Venante). On one occasion, she recounts, the lion is joined by officers of his court, a wild ox and a wolf, who divide the catch into three and invite their lord to apportion it. Then on another occasion, when the lion is accompanied by a goat and a sheep, the deer they take is divided into four. In both cases the lion begins by claiming portions as a legal right and retains the others with threats. In La Fontaine's Fables there is a fourfold division between a heifer, a goat and a lamb (Fables I.6). Each of these the lion retains because he is king, the strongest, the bravest, and will kill the first who touches the fourth part.

A Latin reference to Aesop's fable is found at the start of the Common Era, where the phrase societas leonina (a leonine company) was used by one Roman lawyer to describe the kind of unequal business partnership described by Aesop. The early 19th century writer Jefferys Taylor also retold the fable in terms of a commercial enterprise in his poem "The Beasts in Partnership":

This firm once existed, I'd have you to know,
Messrs Lion, Wolf, Tiger, Fox, Leopard & Co;
These in business were join'd, and of course 'twas implied,
They their stocks should unite, and the profits divide.

== The Babrius version ==
In the extended Greek telling of Babrius, it is a lion and a wild donkey who go hunting together, the first outstanding for strength, the second for speed. The lion divides their take into three, awarding himself the first because he is king of the beasts, the second because they are 'equal' partners, and suggesting that the ass runs away quickly rather than dare to touch the third. The moral Babrius draws is, "Measure yourself! Do not engage in any business or partnership with a man more powerful!"

Another version that first appeared in the Middle Ages is more cynical still. A fox joins the lion and donkey in hunting. When the donkey divides their catch into three equal portions, the angry lion kills the donkey and eats him. The fox then puts everything into one pile, leaving just a tiny bit for herself, and tells the lion to choose. When the lion asks her how she learned to share things this way, the fox replies, "From the donkey's misfortune." This variation is given a separate number (149) in the Perry Index and is the one followed by such Neo-Latin writers as Gabriele Faerno and Hieronymus Osius and in English by Geoffrey Whitney.

This alternative fable was given a different reading by the 13th century Persian poet Rumi in his Masnavi. He began by orienting the reader to interpret the fable in a spiritual sense:

Melt away your existence, as copper in the elixir, in the being of Him who fosters existence.
You have fastened both your hands tight on 'I' and 'we': all this ruin is caused by dualism.

In Rumi's telling, the lion had a wolf and a fox as hunting companions. The lion ordered the wolf to divide the catch and when it did so into three parts, tore off the wolf's head, just as the lion tore the donkey to pieces in Aesop's fable. Rumi's speciality, however, is always to offer an explanation of his actors' motives. In this case the lion explains that it is an act of grace for him to do so since the wolf did not recognise superiority when he saw it.

When the fox was tested in the same way, he did not even retain a morsel for himself, explaining (as in the Greek version) that he had learned wisdom from the wolf's fate and thanking the lion for giving him the privilege of going second. This allows Rumi to conclude that we are lucky to be living now, with the examples of past generations to guide us. Rumi's fox then worships at the feet of the lion, addressing him with the words "O king of the world" and is duly rewarded for this devotion with everything that he had resigned to the divine king.

Much the same interpretation was given to the tale by Rumi's English contemporary, Odo of Cheriton, in the Latin work known as Parabolae. For him too the lion is a symbol of God and his actions are interpreted as an expression of divine justice. Odo explains that the lion punished the wolf, as God did Adam, for the sin of disobedience. The moral of the story is to learn from this example to show reverence to God, just as the fox learned from the wolf's punishment. This reading of the fable therefore gained currency in Western Europe too, both via the preachers who used Odo's book as a source of stories for their sermons and through translations of it into French, Spanish and Welsh.

== Other related Eastern fables ==
There is a close family resemblance between fables where the lion takes all because he can and fables where an arbiter takes advantage of his powerful position, and indeed both are type 51 in the Aarne–Thompson classification system. The 10th-century Arabic Encyclopedia of the Brethren of Purity tells one such arbitration fable, said there to be of Indian origin. Here a group of foxes are sharing a dead camel. They cannot decide how to divide it among themselves and persuade a passing wolf to make a just division. At first the wolf begins to do this, but on further consideration he decides to keep the rest for himself, as he is, after all, more powerful. (In this case, however, the foxes appeal to the lion who decides in their favour and kills the wolf and returns the camel to them.)

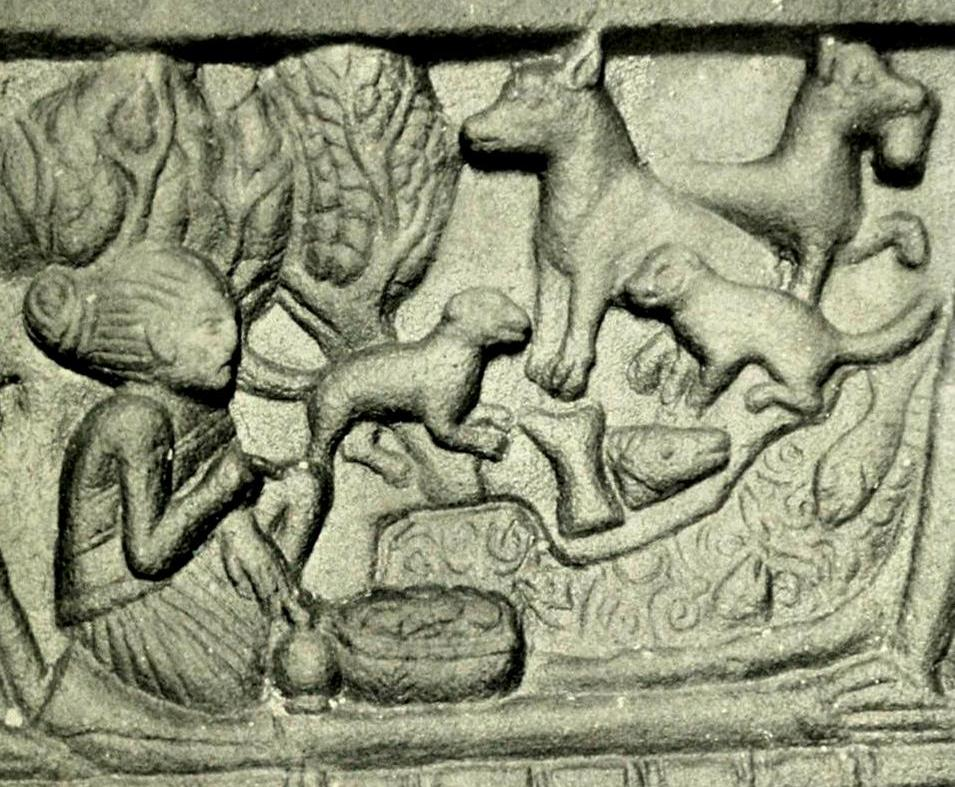
The tale of the jackal and the otters, a 2nd-century BCE Indian sculpture from the Bharhut stupa

This fable shades into an Indian variant of the story, first told as the Dabbhapuppha Jataka, which features different animals but has at its centre the same situation of an animal making an unequal division. Here a jackal offers to arbitrate between two otters who are quarrelling over a fish they have co-operated in bringing to land. The jackal awards them the head and tail and runs off with the bulk of their catch. As well as being a condemnation of the greed that leads to strife, the tale takes a sceptical view of how the powerful frame the law to suit themselves, concluding with the satirical verse:

Just as, when strife arises among men,
They seek an arbiter: he's leader then;
Their wealth decays and the king's coffers gain.

In that the tale deals with outside arbitration, however, it has certain points in common with another of Aesop's fables, The Lion, the Bear and the Fox, in which the first two beasts simultaneously attack a kid and then fight over their spoil. When they are both too exhausted to move, a fox steals their prey and leaves them to reflect, "How much better it would have been to have shared in a friendly spirit."
