= Aliboron wongi =

Scientific classification
- Domain: Eukaryota
- Kingdom: Animalia
- Phylum: Arthropoda
- Class: Insecta
- Order: Coleoptera
- Suborder: Polyphaga
- Infraorder: Cucujiformia
- Family: Cerambycidae
- Genus: Aliboron
- Species: A. wongi

Binomial name
- Aliboron wongi Hüdepohl, 1987

Species of beetle

Aliboron wongi is a species of beetle in the family Cerambycidae. It was described by Hüdepohl in 1987.
