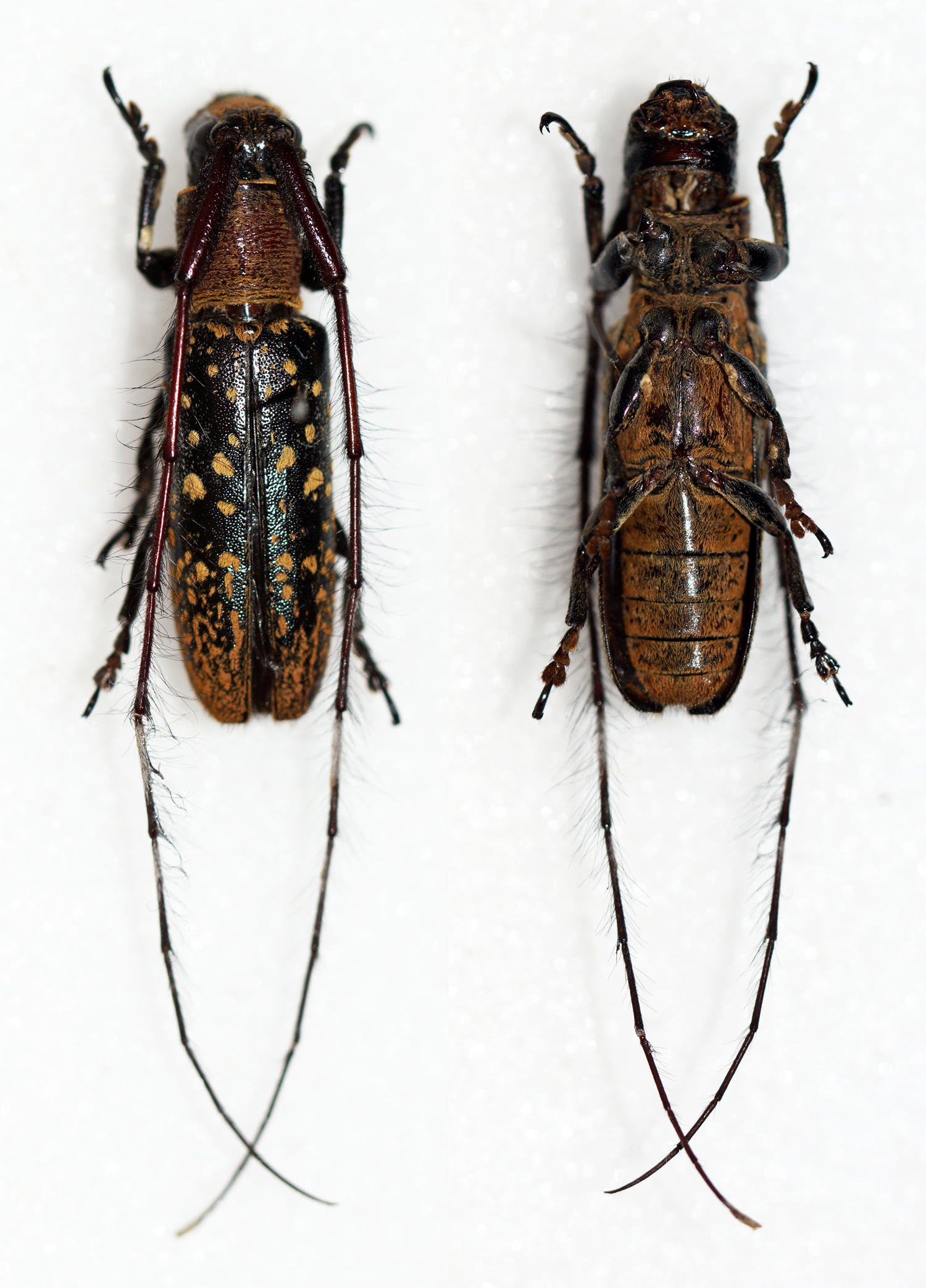

Scientific classification
- Domain: Eukaryota
- Kingdom: Animalia
- Phylum: Arthropoda
- Class: Insecta
- Order: Coleoptera
- Suborder: Polyphaga
- Infraorder: Cucujiformia
- Family: Cerambycidae
- Genus: Aliboron
- Species: A. bukidnoni

Binomial name
- Aliboron bukidnoni Vives, 2005

= Aliboron bukidnoni =

Species of beetle

Aliboron bukidnoni is a species of beetle in the family Cerambycidae. It was described by Vives in 2005.
