= The Fox and the Stork =

Fable by Aesop

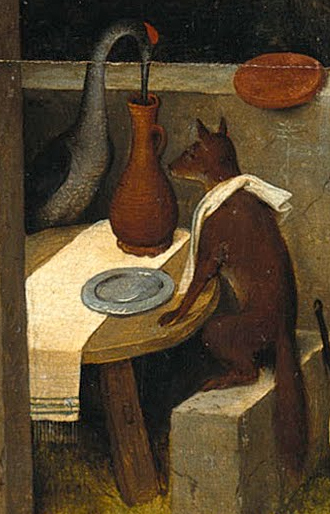
The fox and the crane dining together in Pieter Bruegel's 1559 Netherlandish Proverbs

The Fox and the Stork, also known as The Fox and the Crane, is one of Aesop's fables and is first recorded in the collection of Phaedrus. It is numbered 426 in the Perry Index.

== The fable ==
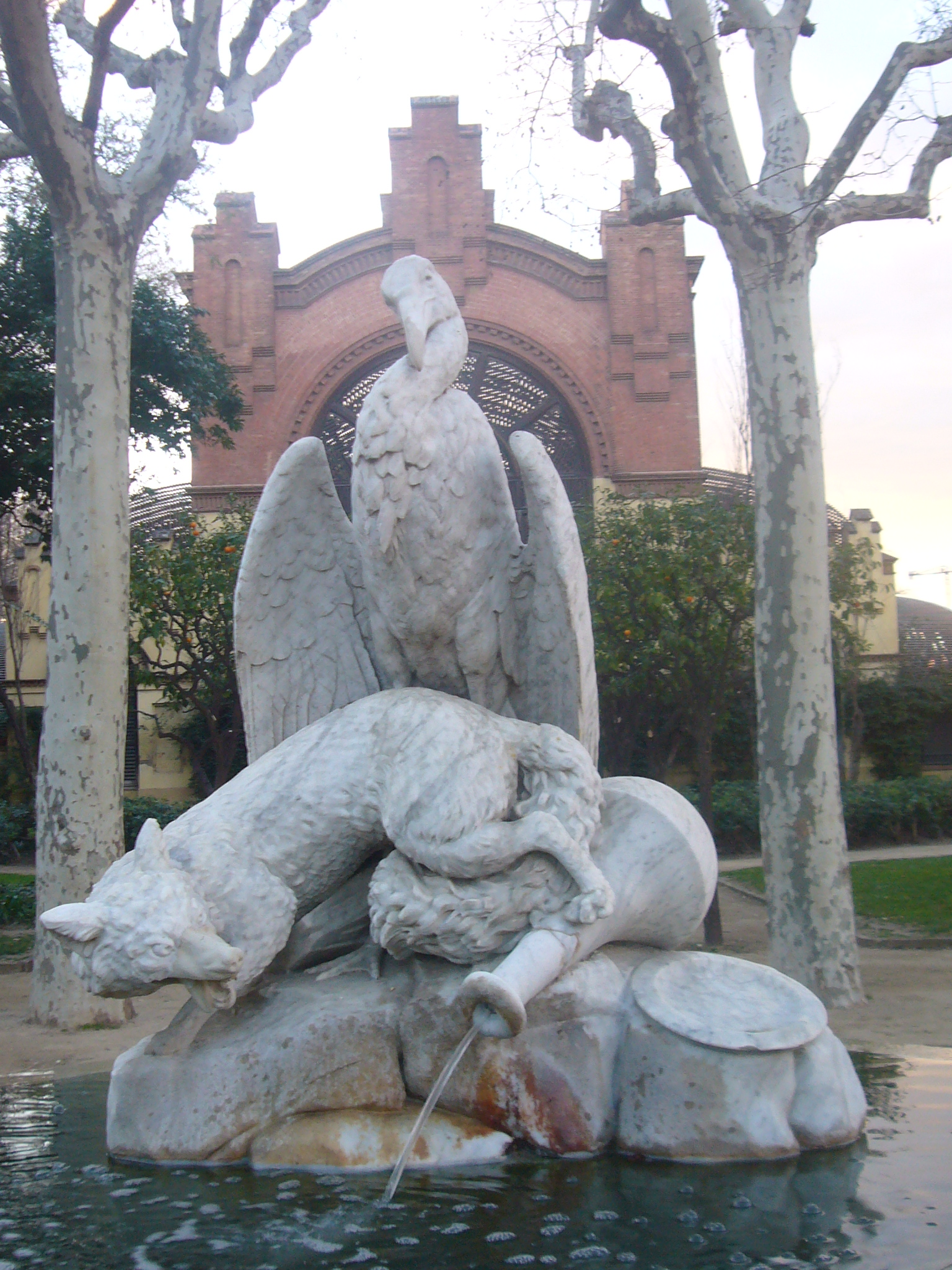
The 1884 fountain design by Catalan sculptor Eduard Batiste Alentorn in Barcelona

A fox invites a stork to eat with him and provides soup in a bowl, which the fox can lap up easily; however, the stork cannot drink it with its beak. The stork then invites the fox to a meal, which is served in a narrow-necked vessel. It is easy for the stork to access but impossible for the fox.

== In art ==
The fable has been illustrated since the Middle Ages in Europe. One of the earliest depictions is on the top of a column on the north side of the cloisters in the Collegiate church of Saint Ursus in Aosta, Italy. In the Romanesque style of the 12th century, both the fox's and the stork's tricks are shown on different sides.

One exception in the applied arts occurred when both episodes were included among the 39 hydraulic statues built for the Versailles labyrinth that was constructed for Louis XIV to further the Dauphin's education. A similar solution is provided by the suggestive sculptures in the square of Barzy-sur-Marne, where the two animals are juxtaposed at right angles and the meal is left to the viewer's imagination. A different solution was chosen by Pieter Bruegel the Elder in his depiction of Netherlandish Proverbs (1559). The saying 'The fox and the crane entertain each other' had come to mean that tricksters look out for their own advantage, so the two are pictured at the centre of the painting seated before their preferred receptacle.

The story's popularity was further assured after it appeared in La Fontaine's Fables (I.18). It then began to be applied on a number of domestic items, including buttons, firebacks, snuff graters, household china and tiles, and on wallpaper. Among the artists who have chosen it as a subject are Frans Snyders (about 1650),Jan van Kessel, senior (1661), Jean-Baptiste Oudry (1747) and his son Jacques-Charles, Hippolyte Lecomte, and Philippe Rousseau (1816–1887). It also features on the right-hand side of Gustav Klimt's "The Fable" (1883). There the fox is accompanied by two storks, one of which has a frog in its beak – in reference to the fable of The Frogs Who Desired a King. In the contemporary fountain sculpture by the Catalan Eduard Batiste Alentorn (1855–1920) in Barcelona's Parc de la Ciutadella, the frustrated fox kicks over the tall vessel, from which the fountain's water pours.

In the 20th century, Le Renard et la Cigogne figured in the series of medals illustrating La Fontaine's fables cast by Jean Vernon (1940) and Marc Chagall made it Plate 9 in his etchings of them (1952). Among European musical settings was one by Louis Lacombe (op. 72, 1875). Later it appeared as the first piece in Andre Asriel's 6 Fabeln nach Aesop (1972). In 1995 it was among the seven in Catalan translation that the composer Xavier Benguerel i Godó set for recitation with orchestral accompaniment.

The fable has also appeared on postage stamps illustrating La Fontaine's fables. These include in the 11 franc commemorative set of 1977 from Burundi; the 35 franc stamp issued by Dahomey in 1972, later overprinted as a 50 franc value for Benin; the 170 forint stamp issued as part of a set by Hungary in 1960; and a 1972 Monaco commemoration of the 350th anniversary of the fabulist's birth.

== See also ==
- The Ugly Duckling
