= Netherlandish Proverbs =

Painting by Pieter Bruegel the Elder

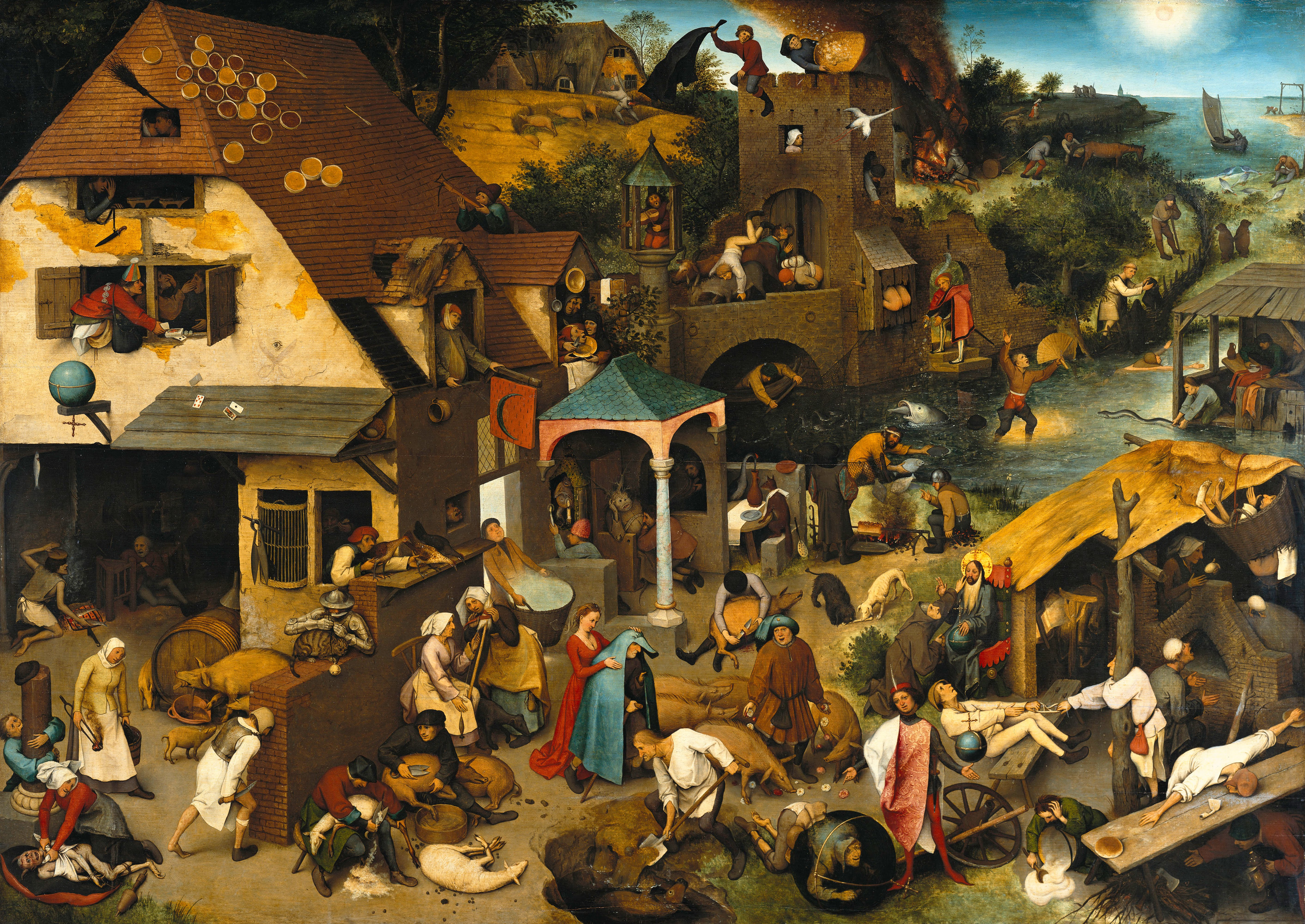
- Artist: Pieter Bruegel the Elder
- Year: 1559
- Medium: Oil-on-panel
- Dimensions: 117 cm × 163 cm (46 in × 64 in)
- Location: Gemäldegalerie, Berlin

Netherlandish Proverbs (Dutch: Nederlandse Spreekwoorden; also called Flemish Proverbs, The Blue Cloak or The Topsy Turvy World) is a 1559 oil-on-oak-panel painting by Pieter Bruegel the Elder that depicts a scene in which humans and, to a lesser extent, animals and objects, offer literal illustrations of Dutch-language proverbs and idioms.

Running themes in Bruegel's paintings that appear in Netherlandish Proverbs are the absurdity, wickedness and foolishness of humans. Its original title, The Blue Cloak or The Folly of the World, indicates that Bruegel's intent was not just to illustrate proverbs, but rather to catalogue human folly. Many of the people depicted show the characteristic blank features that Bruegel used to portray fools.

His son, Pieter Brueghel the Younger, specialised in making copies of his father's work and painted at least 16 copies of Netherlandish Proverbs. Not all versions of the painting, by father or son, show exactly the same proverbs and they also differ in other minor details. The original work by Bruegel the Elder is in the collection of the Gemäldegalerie, Berlin, with the copies in numerous other collections (see below).

== History ==
=== Context ===
Proverbs were very popular in Bruegel's time and before; a hundred years before Bruegel's painting, illustrations of proverbs had been popular in the Flemish books of hours. A number of collections were published, including Adagia, by the Dutch humanist Desiderius Erasmus. The French writer François Rabelais employed significant numbers in his novel Gargantua and Pantagruel, completed in 1564.

The Flemish artist Frans Hogenberg made an engraving illustrating 43 proverbs in around 1558, roughly the same time as Bruegel's painting. The work is very similar in composition to Bruegel's and includes certain proverbs (like the Blue Cloak) which also feature prominently in Netherlandish Proverbs. By depicting literal renditions of proverbs in a peasant setting, both artists have shown a "world turned upside down".

Bruegel himself had produced several works, mostly prints and drawings, on the subject of proverbs, including Big Fish Eat Little Fish (1556) and Twelve Proverbs (1558), but Netherlandish Proverbs is thought to have been his first large-scale painting on the theme.

== The painting ==
The painting, dated 1559, is considered the best of a series of similar paintings which at one time or another have all previously been attributed to Pieter Bruegel the Elder, has been x-rayed for its underdrawing to compare it to other versions. None of the versions have a provenance going back further than the late 19th century, but Bruegel scholars believe that the paintings are the elder Bruegel's inventions, which all make use of a life-size cartoon with the same underdrawing as that used in the Berlin version. The paintings, which are not inscribed, tease the viewer into guessing proverbs. They are based on 1558 and earlier engravings that are inscribed, in Flemish. The most notable of these regarding the paintings is by Frans Hogenberg, and it is dated 1558 and accompanied by the title Die blau huicke is dit meest ghenaemt, maer des weerelts abvisen he beter betaempt (English: Often called 'The Blue Cloak', this could better be called 'The World's Follies'). The Doetecum brothers produced a print series in 1577 called De Blauwe Huyck. Theodoor Galle also made a print, dated later, with a similar title: Dese wtbeeldinghe wort die blauw hvyck genaemt, maer deze werelts abvysen haer beter betaemt.

== Proverbs and idioms ==
Critics have praised the composition for its ordered portrayal and integrated scene. There are approximately 126 identifiable proverbs and idioms in the scene, although Bruegel may have included others which cannot be determined because of the language change. Some of those incorporated in the painting are still in popular use, for instance "Swimming against the tide", "Banging one's head against a brick wall" and "Armed to the teeth". Many more have faded from use, which makes analysis of the painting harder. "Having one's roof tiled with tarts", for example, which meant to have an abundance of everything and was an image Bruegel would later feature in his painting of the idyllic Land of Cockaigne (1567).

The Blue Cloak, the piece's original title, features in the centre of the piece and is being placed on a man by his wife, indicating that she is cuckolding him. Other proverbs indicate human foolishness. A man fills in a pond after his calf has died. Just above the central figure of the blue-cloaked man, another man carries daylight in a basket. Some of the figures seem to represent more than one figure of speech (whether this was Bruegel's intention or not is unknown), such as the man shearing a sheep in the centre bottom left of the picture. He is sitting next to a man shearing a pig, so represents the expression "One shears sheep and one shears pigs", meaning that one has the advantage over the other, but may also represent the advice "Shear them but don't skin them", meaning make the most of available assets.

=== List of proverbs and idioms featured in the painting ===
Expressions featured in the painting
	Proverb/idiom	Meaning	Area	Image
001	To be able to tie even the devil to a pillow ^{(fr)}^{(nl)}	Obstinacy overcomes everything	Lower left	
002	To be a pillar-biter ^{(fr)}^{(nl)}^{(it)}^{(lmo)}	To be a religious hypocrite	Lower left	
003	Never believe someone who carries fire in one hand and water in the other ^{(fr)}^{(nl)}	To be two-faced and to stir up trouble	Lower left	
004	To bang one's head against a brick wall ^{(fr)}^{(nl)}	To waste one's time on an impossible task	Lower left	
005	One foot shod, the other bare^{(fr)}^{(nl)}	Balance is paramount	Lower left	
006	The sow pulls the bung ^{(fr)}^{(nl)}	Negligence will be rewarded with disaster	Lower left	
007	To bell the cat ^{(fr)}^{(nl)}	To carry out a dangerous or impractical plan	Lower left	
008	To be armed to the teeth ^{(fr)}^{(nl)}^{(de)}	To be heavily armed	Lower left	
009	To put your armor on ^{(fr)}^{(nl)}	To be angry	Lower left	
010	One shears sheep, the other shears pigs ^{(fr)}^{(nl)}	One has all the advantages, the other none	Lower left	
011	Shear them but do not skin them ^{(fr)}^{(nl)}	Do not press your advantage too far	Lower left	
012	The herring does not fry here ^{(nl)}	It's not going according to plan	Lower left	
013	To fry the whole herring for the sake of the roe ^{(fr)}^{(nl)}	To do too much to achieve a little	Lower left	
014	To get the lid on the head ^{(nl)}	To end up taking responsibility	Lower left	
015	The herring hangs by its own gills ^{(fr)}^{(nl)}	You must accept responsibility for your own actions	Lower left	
016	There is more to it than (just) a single herring ^{(nl)}	There is more to it than meets the eye	Lower left	
017	What can smoke do to iron? ^{(fr)}^{(nl)}	There is no point in trying to change the unchangeable	Lower left	
018	To find the dog in the pot ^{(fr)}^{(nl)}	To arrive too late for dinner and find all the food has been eaten	Lower left (Note: The lighting makes it almost impossible to make out the dog.)	
019	To sit between two stools in the ashes ^{(fr)}^{(nl)}^{(de)}	To be indecisive	Lower left	
020	To be a hen feeler ^{(fr)}^{(nl)}	To be very miserly (feeling whether the hen is about to lay an egg before slaughtering it)	Middle left	
021	The scissors hang out there ^{(fr)}^{(nl)}	They are liable to cheat you there	Upper left	
022	To always gnaw on a single bone ^{(fr)}^{(nl)}	To continually talk about the same subject	Upper left	
023	It depends on the fall of the cards ^{(fr)}^{(nl)}	It is up to chance	Upper left	
024	The world is turned upside down ^{(fr)}^{(nl)}^{(de)}	Everything is the opposite of what it should be	Upper left	
025	Leave at least one egg in the nest ^{(fr)}^{(nl)}	Always have something in reserve	Upper left	
026	To crap on the world ^{(fr)}^{(nl)}^{(de)}	To despise everything	Upper left	
027	To lead each other by the nose ^{(fr)}^{(nl)}^{(de)}	To fool each other	Upper left	
028	The die is cast ^{(fr)}^{(nl)}^{(de)}	The decision is made	Upper left	
029	Fools get the best cards ^{(fr)}^{(nl)}	Luck can overcome intelligence	Upper left	
030	To look through one's fingers ^{(fr)}^{(nl)}	To turn a blind eye	Upper left	
031	There hangs the knife ^{(fr)}^{(nl)}	To issue a challenge	Upper left	
032	There stand the wooden shoes ^{(fr)}^{(nl)}	To wait in vain	Upper left	
033	To stick out the broom ^{(fr)}^{(nl)}	To have fun while the master is away	Upper left	
034	To marry under the broomstick ^{(fr)}^{(nl)}	To live together without marrying	Upper left	
035	To have the roof tiled with tarts ^{(fr)}^{(nl)}	To be very wealthy	Upper left	
036	To have a hole in one's roof ^{(fr)}^{(nl)}^{(de)}	To be unintelligent	Upper left	
037	An old roof needs a lot of patching up ^{(fr)}^{(nl)}	Old things need more maintenance	Upper left	
038	The roof has laths^{(fr)}^{(nl)}	There could be eavesdroppers (The walls have ears)	Middle left	
039	To have toothache behind the ears^{(fr)}^{(nl)}	To be a malingerer	Middle left	
040	To be pissing against the moon^{(fr)}^{(nl)}	To waste one's time on a futile endeavour	Middle left	
041	Here hangs the pot^{(fr)}^{(nl)}	It is the opposite of what it should be	Middle left	
042	To shoot a second bolt to find the first^{(fr)}^{(nl)}	To repeat a foolish action	Upper left	
043	To shave the fool without lather^{(fr)}^{(nl)}	To trick somebody	Middle	
044	Two fools under one hood^{(fr)}^{(nl)}	Stupidity loves company	Middle	
045	It grows out of the window^{(fr)}^{(nl)}	It cannot be concealed	Middle	
046	To play on the pillory^{(fr)}^{(nl)}	To attract attention to one's shameful acts	Upper middle	
047	When the gate is open the pigs will run into the corn^{(fr)}^{(nl)}	Disaster ensues from carelessness	Upper middle	
048	When the corn decreases the pig increases	If one person gains then another must lose	Upper middle	
049	To run like one's backside is on fire^{(fr)}^{(nl)}	To be in great distress	Upper middle	
050	He who eats fire, craps sparks	Do not be surprised at the outcome if you attempt a dangerous venture	Upper middle	
051	To hang one's cloak according to the wind^{(fr)}^{(nl)}^{(de)}	To adapt one's viewpoint to the current opinion	Upper middle	
052	To toss feathers in the wind ^{(fr)}^{(nl)}	To work fruitlessly	Upper middle	
053	To gaze at the stork^{(fr)}^{(nl)}	To waste one's time	Upper middle	
054	To try to kill two flies with one stroke^{(fr)}^{(nl)}^{(de)}	To be efficient (equivalent to today's To kill two birds with one stone)	Upper middle	
055	To fall from the ox onto the rear end of an ass^{(fr)}^{(nl)}	To fall on hard times	Upper middle	
056	To kiss the ring of the door ^{(fr)}^{(nl)}	To be obsequious	Upper middle	
057	To wipe one's backside on the door ^{(nl)}	To treat something lightly	Upper middle	
058	To go around shouldering a burden ^{(fr)} ^{(nl)}	To imagine that things are worse than they are	Upper middle	
059	One beggar pities the other standing in front of the door^{(nl)}	Being afraid for competition	Upper middle	
060	To fish behind the net ^{(fr)}^{(nl)}	To miss an opportunity	Middle	
061	Sharks eat smaller fish ^{(fr)}^{(nl)}	Anything people say will be put in perspective according to their level of importance	Middle	
062	To be unable to see the sun shine on the water^{(fr)}^{(nl)}	To be jealous of another's success	Middle	
063	It hangs like a privy over a ditch ^{(fr)}^{(nl)}	Something that is extremely obvious	Middle	
064	Anybody can see through an oak plank if there is a hole in it ^{(fr)}^{(nl)}	There is no point in stating the obvious	Middle	
065	They both crap through the same hole ^{(fr)}^{(nl)}	They are inseparable comrades	Middle	
066	To throw one's money into the water^{(fr)}^{(nl)}	To waste one's money	Middle	
067	A wall with cracks will soon collapse^{(fr)}^{(nl)}	Anything poorly managed will soon fail	Middle right	
068	To not care whose house is on fire as long as one can warm oneself at the blaze^{(fr)}^{(nl)}	To take every opportunity regardless of the consequences to others	Middle right	
069	To drag the block^{(fr)}^{(nl)}	To be deceived by a lover or to work at a pointless task	Upper right	
070	Fear makes the old woman trot^{(fr)}^{(nl)}	An unexpected event can reveal unknown qualities	Upper right	
071	Horse droppings are not figs ^{(fr)}^{(nl)}	Do not be fooled by appearances	Upper right	
072	If the blind lead the blind both will fall in the ditch^{(fr)}^{(nl)}	There is no point in being guided by others who are equally ignorant	Upper right	
073	The journey is not yet over when one can discern the church and steeple ^{(fr)}^{(nl)}	Do not give up until the task is fully complete	Upper right	
074	Everything, however finely spun, finally comes to the sun^{(nl)}	Nothing can be hidden forever	Upper right	
075	To keep one's eye on the sail^{(fr)}^{(nl)}	To stay alert, be wary	Upper right	
076	To crap on the gallows^{(fr)}^{(nl)}	To be undeterred by any penalty	Upper right	
077	Where the carcass is, there fly the crows^{(fr)}^{(nl)}	If there's something to be gained, everyone hurries in front	Upper right	
078	It is easy to sail before the wind^{(fr)}^{(nl)}	If conditions are favourable it is not difficult to achieve one's goal	Upper right	
079	Who knows why geese go barefoot?^{(fr)}^{(nl)}	There is a reason for everything, though it may not be obvious	Upper right	
080	If I am not meant to be their keeper, I will let geese be geese	Do not interfere in matters that are not your concern	Upper right	
081	To see bears dancing (Note: The exact proverb depicted is not known with certainty.)^{(fr)}^{(nl)}	To be starving	Right	
082	Wild bears prefer each other's company^{(nl)}	Peers get along better with each other than with outsiders	Right	
083	To throw one's cowl over the fence^{(fr)}^{(nl)}	To discard something without knowing whether it will be required later	Right	
084	It is ill to swim against the current^{(fr)}^{(nl)}^{(de)}	It is difficult to oppose the general opinion	Right	
085	The pitcher goes to the water until it finally breaks^{(fr)}^{(nl)}^{(de)}	Everything has its limitations	Right	
086	The broadest straps are cut from someone else's leather ^{(fr)}^{(nl)}	One is quick to another's money.	Right	
087	To hold an eel by the tail^{(fr)}^{(nl)}	To undertake a difficult task (Compare: "Catch a tiger by the tail")	Right	
088	To fall through the basket^{(fr)}^{(nl)}	To have your deception uncovered	Right	
089	To be suspended between heaven and earth^{(fr)}^{(nl)}^{(de)}	To be in an awkward situation	Right	
090	To keep the hen's egg and let the goose's egg go^{(fr)}^{(nl)}	To make a bad decision	Right	
091	To yawn against the oven^{(fr)}^{(nl)}	To attempt more than one can manage	Lower right	
092	To be barely able to reach from one loaf to another^{(fr)}^{(nl)}	To have difficulty living within budget	Lower right	
093	A hoe without a handle^{(fr)}^{(nl)}	Probably something useless (Note: The exact meaning of the proverb is not known.)	Lower right	
094	To look for the hatchet^{(fr)}^{(nl)}	To try to find an excuse	Lower right	
095	Here he is with his lantern^{(fr)}^{(nl)}	To finally have an opportunity to show a talent	Lower right	
096	A hatchet with a handle^{(fr)}^{(nl)}	Probably signifies "the whole thing"	Lower right	
097	He who has spilt his porridge cannot scrape it all up again^{(fr)}^{(nl)}	Once something is done it cannot be undone (Compare: "Don't cry over spilt milk")	Lower right	
098	To put a spoke through someone's wheel^{(fr)}^{(nl)}	To put up an obstacle, to destroy someone's plans	Lower right	
099	Love is on the side where the money bag hangs^{(fr)}^{(nl)}	Love can be bought	Lower right	
100	To pull to get the longest end^{(fr)}^{(nl)}	To attempt to get the advantage	Lower right	
101	To stand in one's own light^{(fr)}^{(de)}^{(nl)}	To behave contrarily to one's own happiness or advantage	Lower right	
102	No one looks for others in the oven who has not been in there himself^{(fr)}^{(nl)}	To imagine wickedness in others is a sign of wickedness in oneself	Lower right	
103	To have the world spinning on one's thumb^{(fr)}^{(nl)}	To have every advantage (Compare: "To have the world in the palm of your hand")	Lower right	
104	To tie a flaxen beard to the face of Christ^{(fr)}^{(nl)}	To hide deceit under a veneer of Christian piety	Lower right	
105	To have to stoop to get on in the world^{(fr)}^{(nl)}	To succeed one must be willing to make sacrifices	Lower right	
106	To cast roses before swine^{(fr)}^{(nl)}^{(de)}	To waste effort on the unworthy	Lower middle	
107	To fill the well after the calf has already drowned^{(fr)}^{(nl)}	To take action only after a disaster (Compare: "Shutting the barn door after the horse has bolted")	Lower middle	
108	To be as gentle as a lamb^{(fr)}^{(nl)}^{(de)}	Someone who is exceptionally calm or gentle	Lower middle	
109	She puts the blue cloak on her husband^{(fr)}^{(nl)}	She deceives him	Lower middle	
110	Watch out that a black dog does not come in between^{(fr)}^{(nl)}	Mind that things don't go wrong	Lower middle	
111	One winds on the distaff what the other spins^{(fr)}^{(nl)}	Both spread gossip	Lower middle	
112	To carry the day out in baskets^{(fr)}^{(nl)}^{(de)}	To waste one's time (Compare: "to carry coals to Newcastle" and "to sell sand in the desert") ^{(de)}	Middle	
113	To hold a candle to the Devil^{(fr)}^{(nl)}^{(de)}	To flatter and make friends indiscriminately ^{(de)}	Middle	
114	To confess to the Devil^{(fr)}^{(nl)}^{(de)}	To reveal secrets to one's enemy ^{(de)}	Middle	
115	The pig is stabbed through the belly^{(fr)}^{(nl)}	A foregone conclusion or what is done can not be undone	Middle	
116	Two dogs over one bone seldom agree^{(fr)}^{(nl)}	To argue over a single point	Middle	
117	When two dogs fight out who gets the bone,the third one steals it^{(fr)}^{(nl)}	To fight or argue guarantees loss.	Middle	
118	To be a skimming ladle^{(fr)}^{(nl)}	To be a parasite or sponger	Middle	
119	What is the good of a beautiful plate when there is nothing on it?^{(fr)}^{(nl)}	Beauty does not make up for substance	Middle	
120	The Fox and the Stork or The Fox and the Crane dine together^{(fr)}^{(nl)}	If you trick someone they might get back at you (Note: This proverb derives from Aesop's Fables The Fox and the Crane.)	Middle	
121	To blow in the ear^{(fr)}^{(nl)}	To spread gossip	Middle	
122	Chalk up a debt^{(fr)}^{(nl)}^{(de)}	To owe someone a favour	Middle	
123	The meat on the spit must be basted^{(fr)}^{(nl)}	Certain things need constant attention	Middle	
124	There is no turning the spit with him^{(fr)}^{(nl)}	He is uncooperative	Middle	
125	To sit on hot coals^{(fr)}^{(nl)}^{(de)}	To be impatient	Middle	
126	To catch fish without a net^{(fr)}^{(nl)}	To profit from the work of others	Middle	

== Inspiration for other paintings ==
T. E. Breitenbach's 1975 painting Proverbidioms was inspired by this Dutch painting to depict English proverbs and idioms.

A 2014 illustration from the Hong Kong magazine Passion Times illustrates dozens of Cantonese proverbs.

== In popular culture ==
The painting is featured on the album cover of Fleet Foxes' self-titled first full-length album (2008).

A pixel-art version of the painting is featured in the 2024 video game "Proverbs", developed by Mark Ffrench and published by Divide the Plunder. The game is a combined nonogram and minesweeper style puzzle played on a single massive grid, where solving smaller regions slowly reveals Bruegel's painting.

== Gallery ==
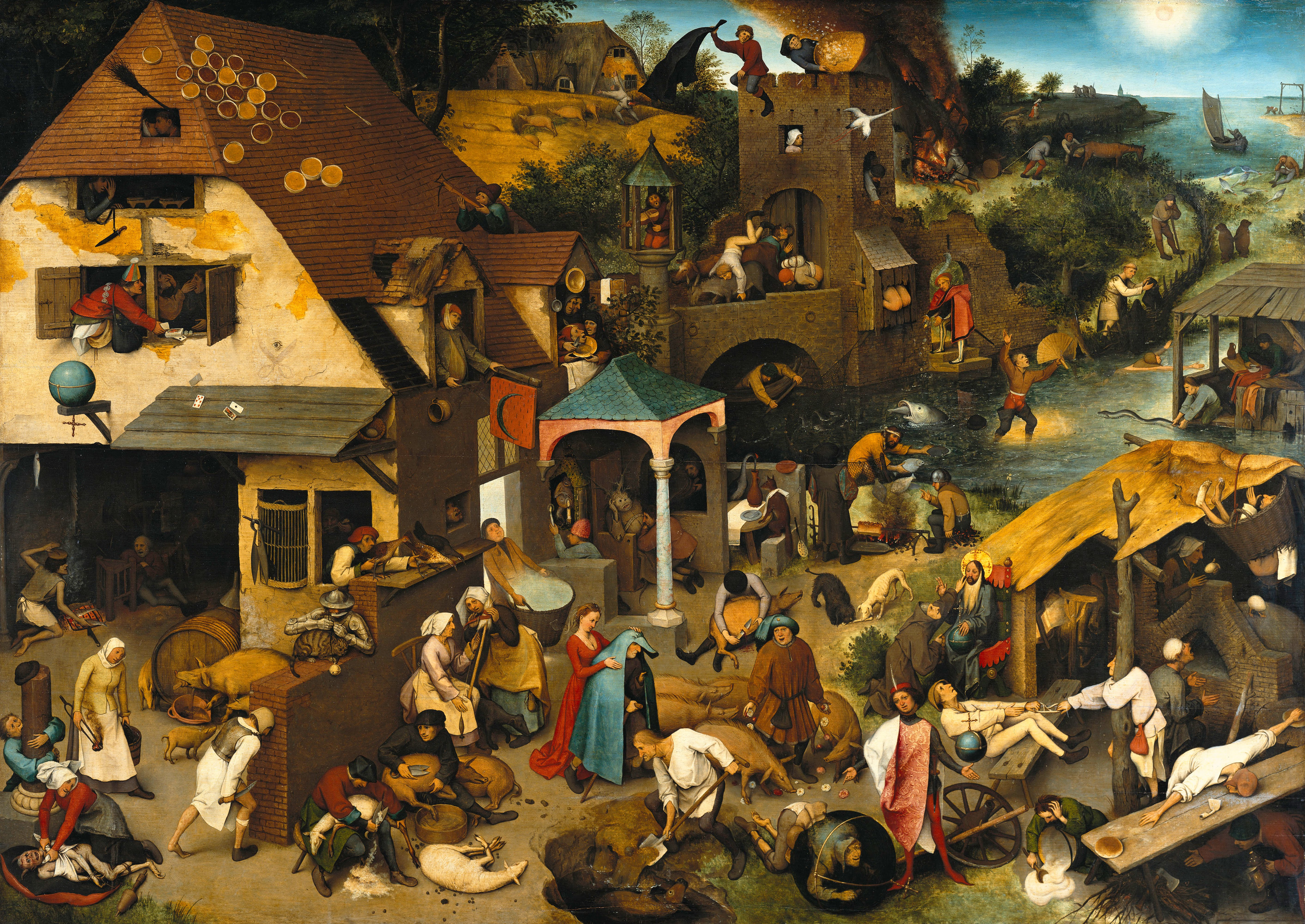
Gemäldegalerie, Berlin

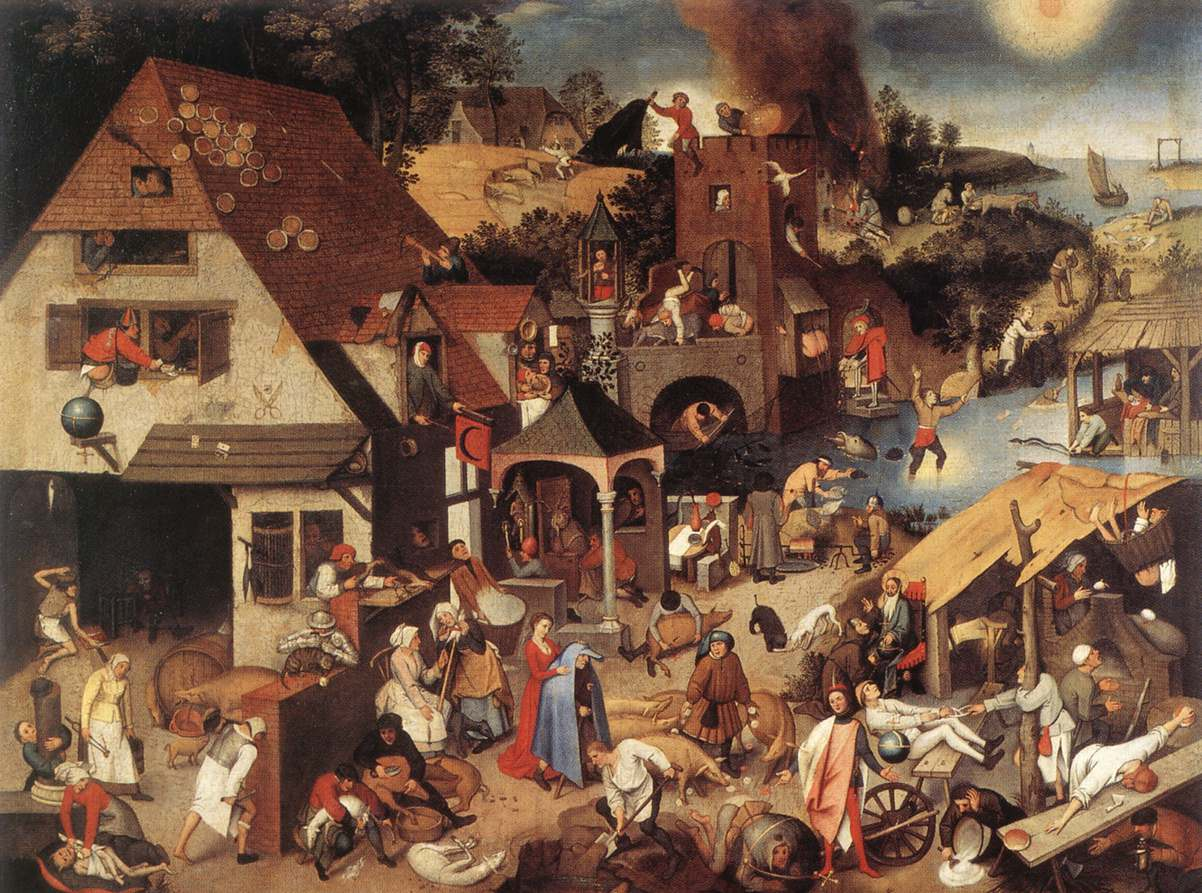
Rockox House, Antwerp

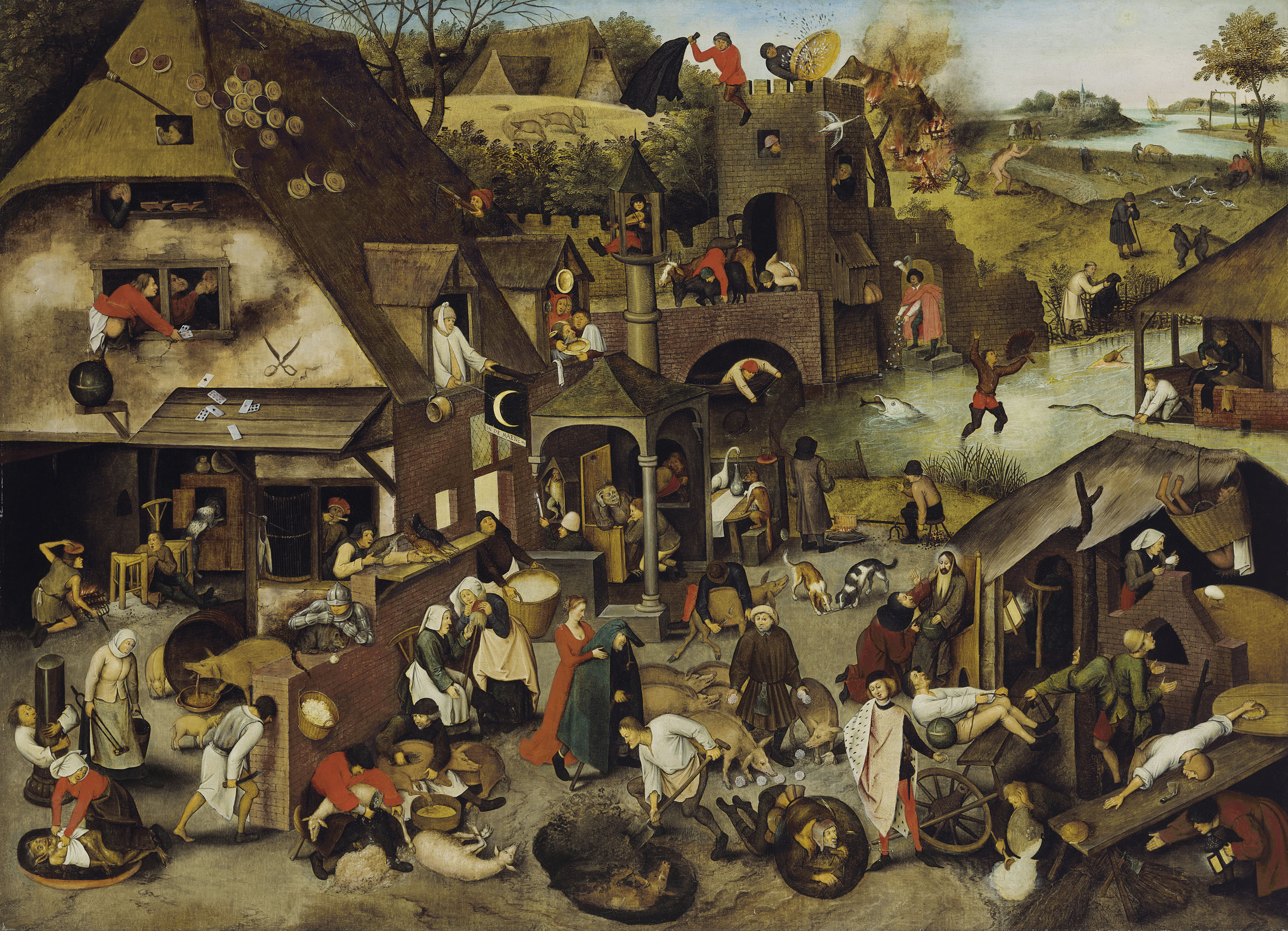
Private collection

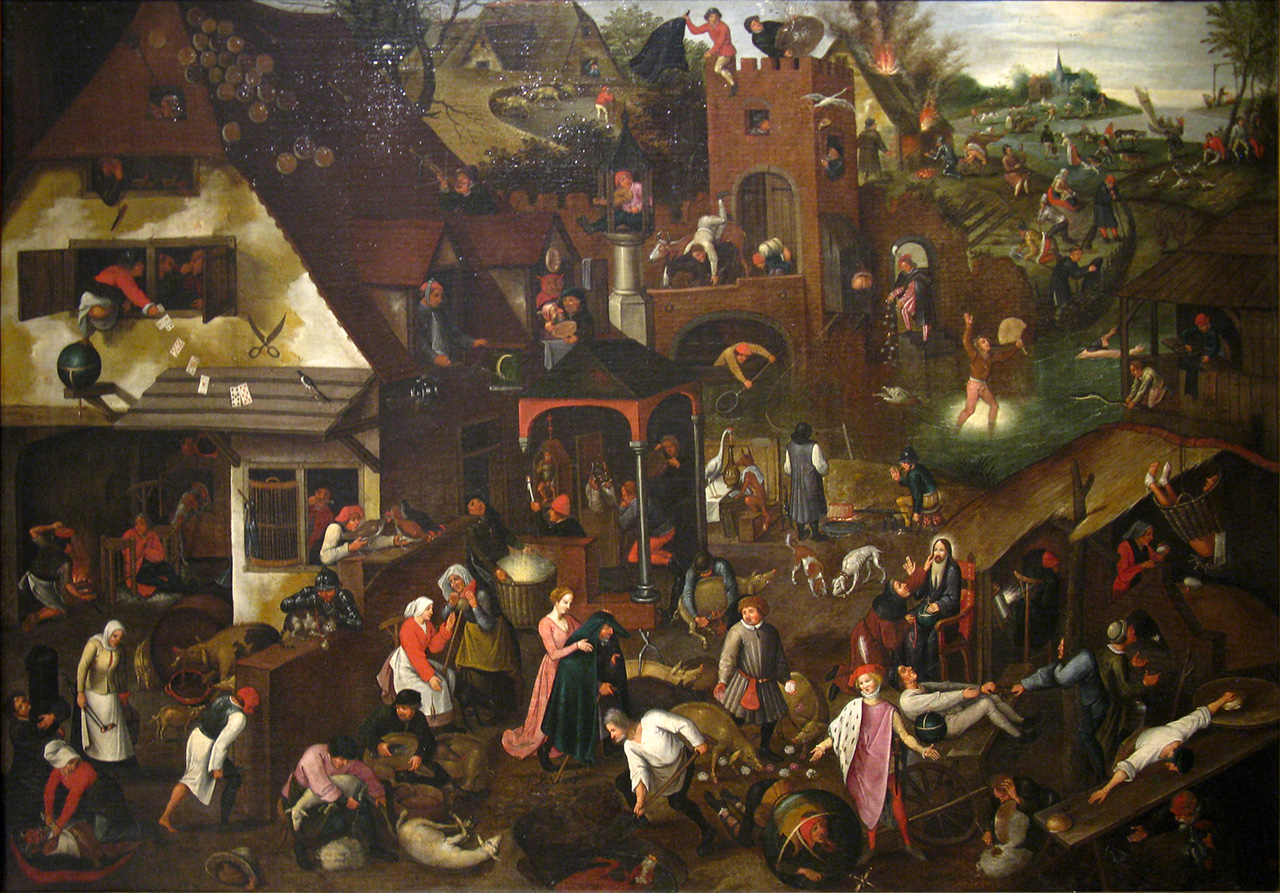
Frans Hals Museum, Haarlem

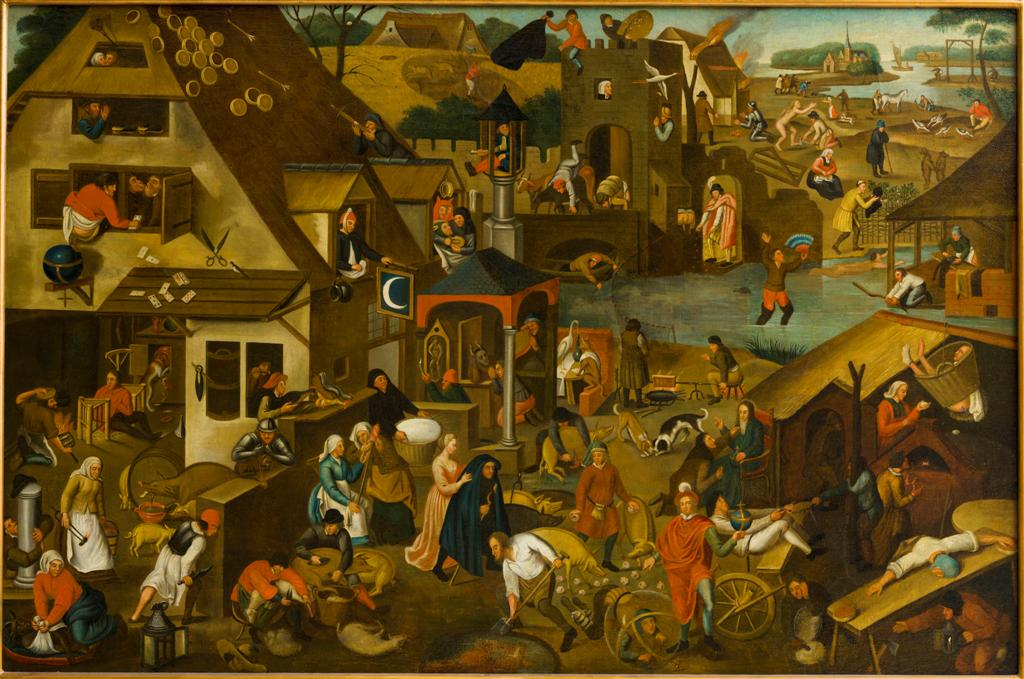
Noord Brabantsmuseum, Den Bosch

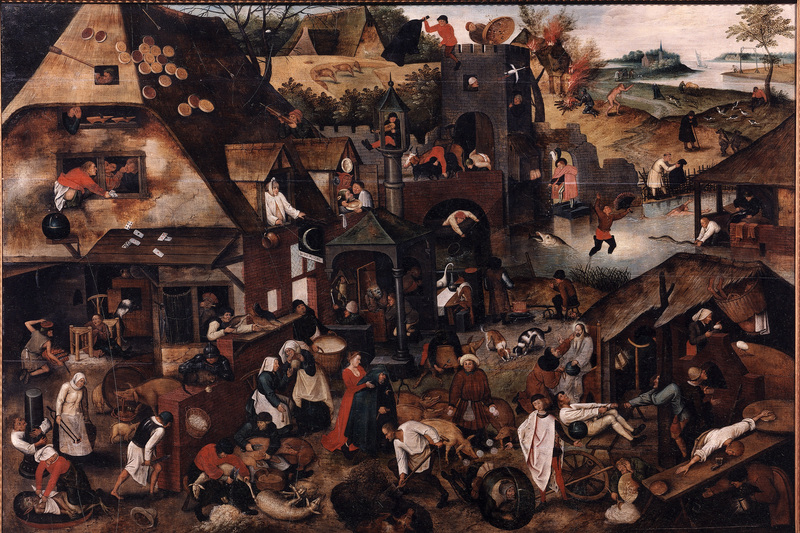
Stedelijk Museum Wuyts-Van Campen en Baron Caroly, Lier

== See also ==
- List of paintings by Pieter Bruegel the Elder
