= The Blue Cloak =

Subject of Flemish art

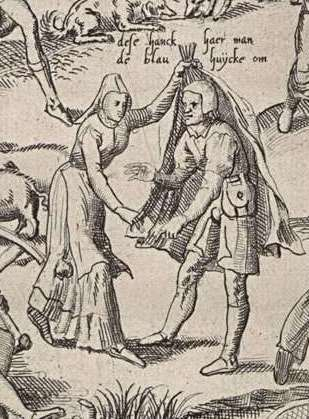
Hogenberg central figure of a woman putting the "blue cloak" over her husband

The Blue Cloak, or De Blauwe Huik, refers to an old concept for a popular 16th-century print series featuring Flemish proverbs. The prints were generally captioned according to each depicted proverb, and central to these was a woman pulling a cloak over a man. That proverb is also central to a 1559 painting called Netherlandish Proverbs by Pieter Bruegel the Elder.

In the print versions, the blue cloak or huik plays the central role:

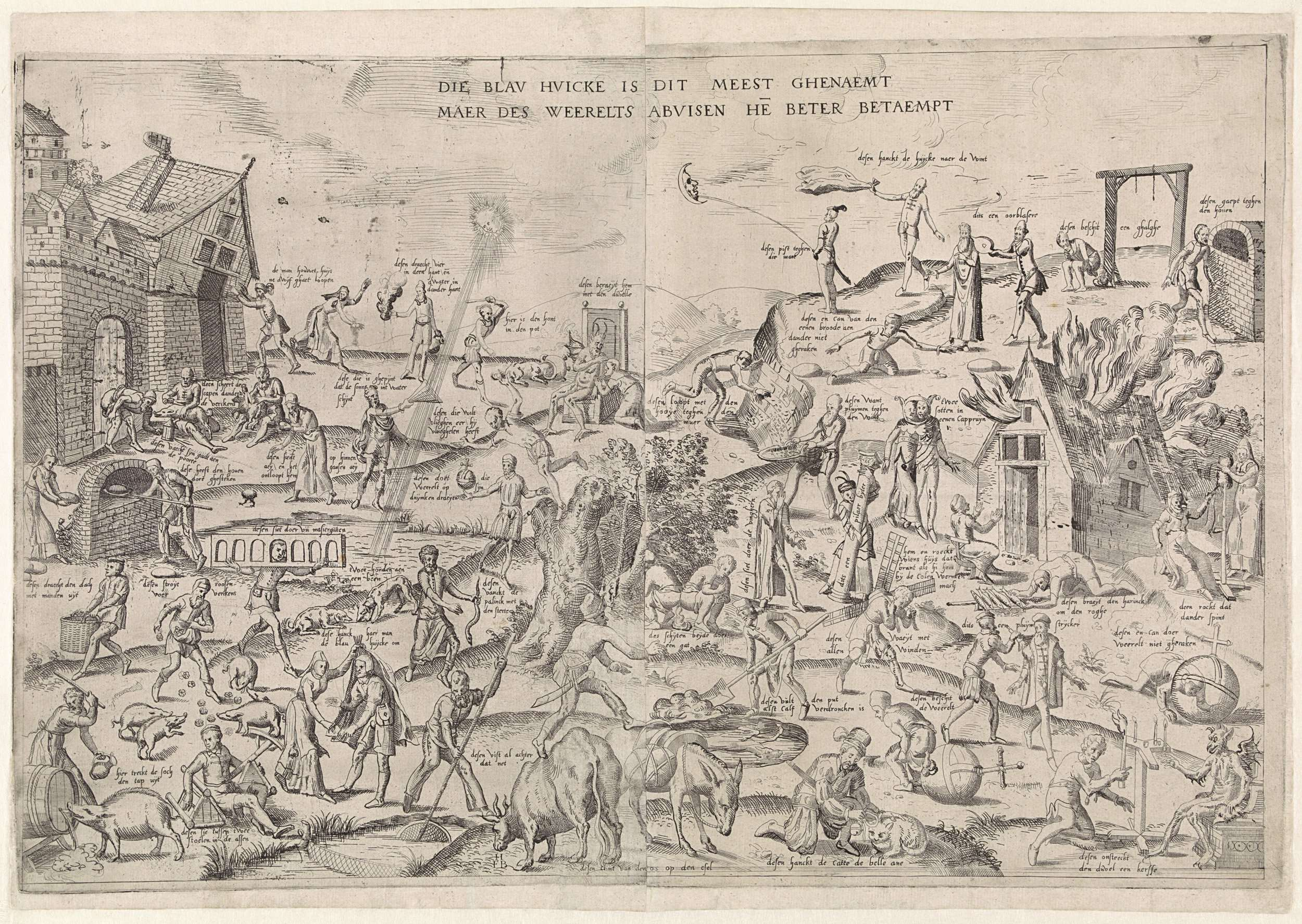
Hogenberg, 1558

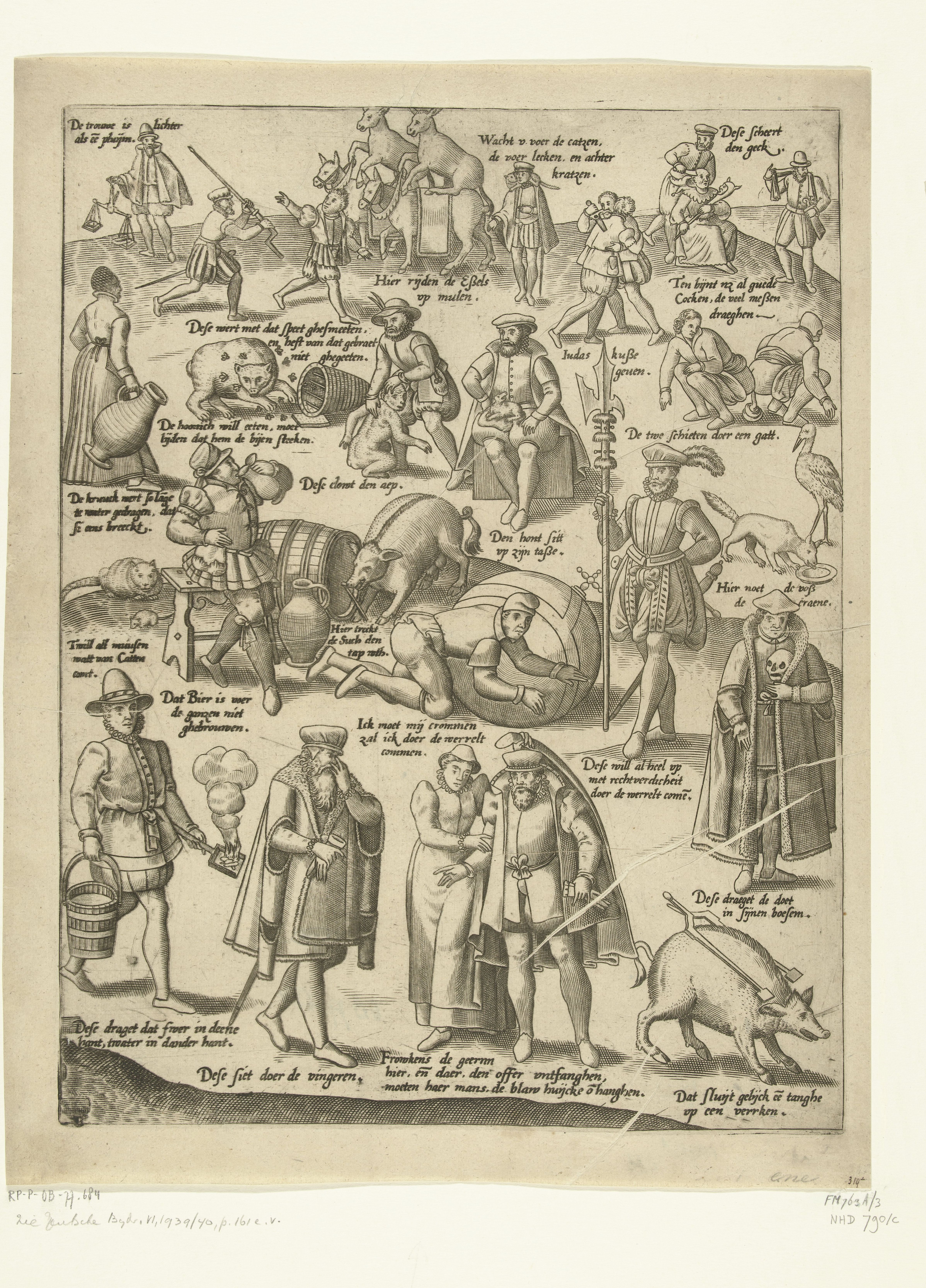
Doetecum, 1577

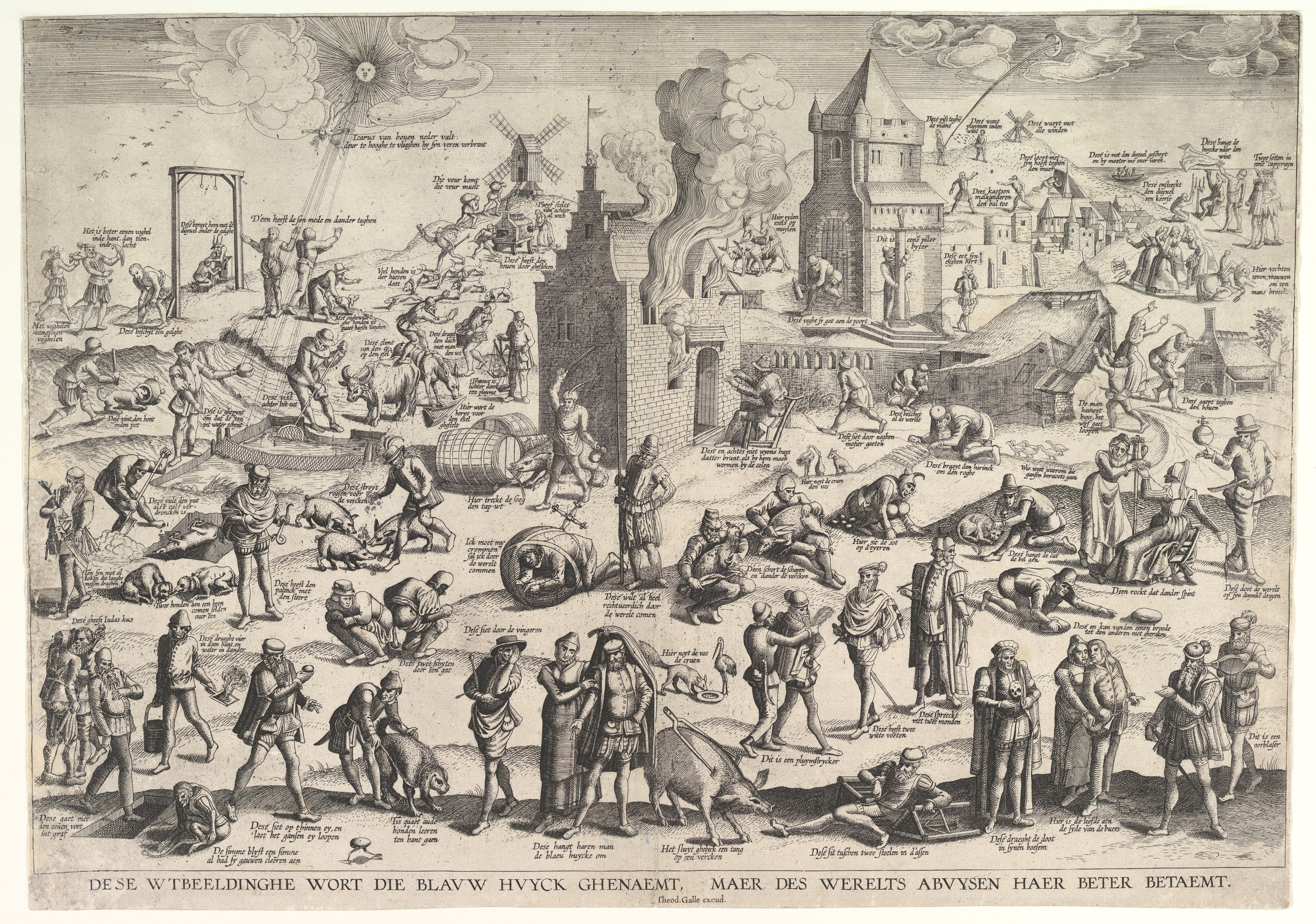
Galle, 1571-1633

Later versions: The painter David Teniers the Younger, who married Brueghel's granddaughter, also made a painting with his own modern interpretation of the same proverbs in 1645, which also surround a central "Blue cloak" scene:

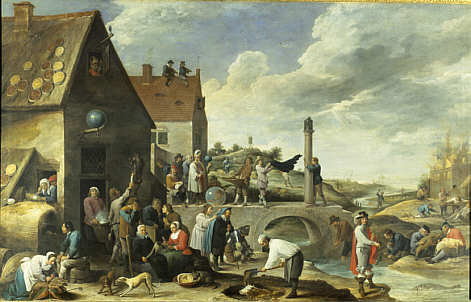

== Meaning ==
The central figure is a woman who is pulling a blue cloak over her husband. This act is a metaphor for adultery, specifically cuckoldry. The cloak represents a deceitful "coverup" that helps her husband to "not see it", which is also indicated by another proverb or expression in the Galle engraving showing a man with his fingers in front of his eyes with the remark "Dese siet door de vingeren" (English: This one acts blind but is 'peeking through his fingers').

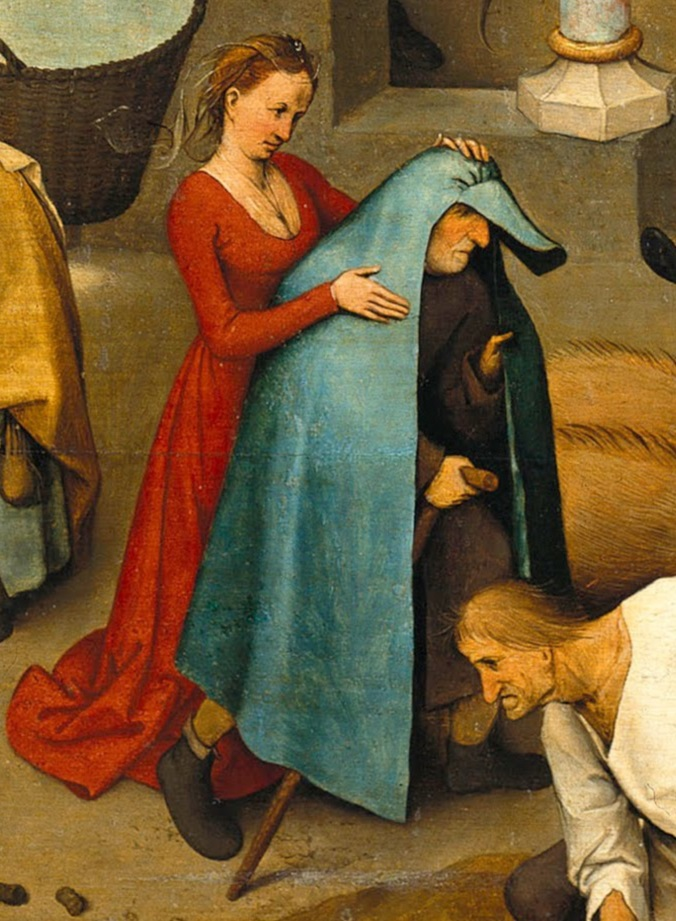
Breughel

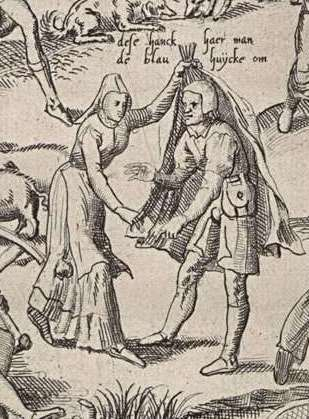
Hogenberg

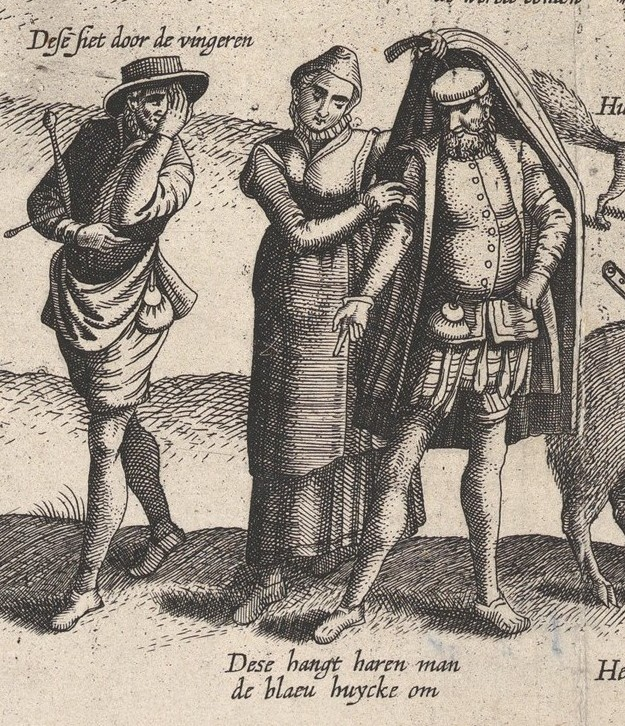
Galle

== Cloak color ==
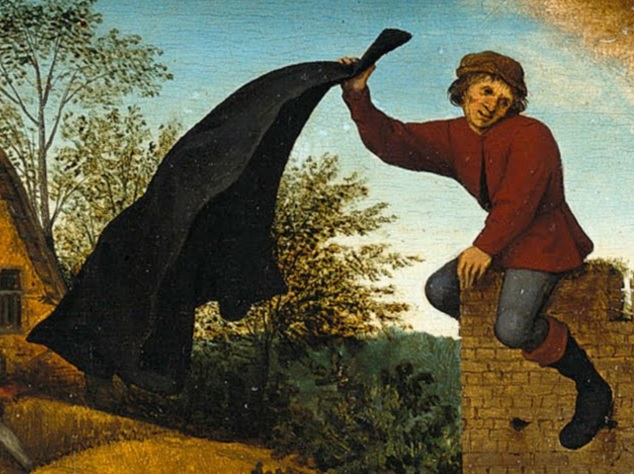
The black huik in the same 1569 Berlin painting, subject of the proverb To hang one's cloak according to the wind or to change one's mind according to fancy

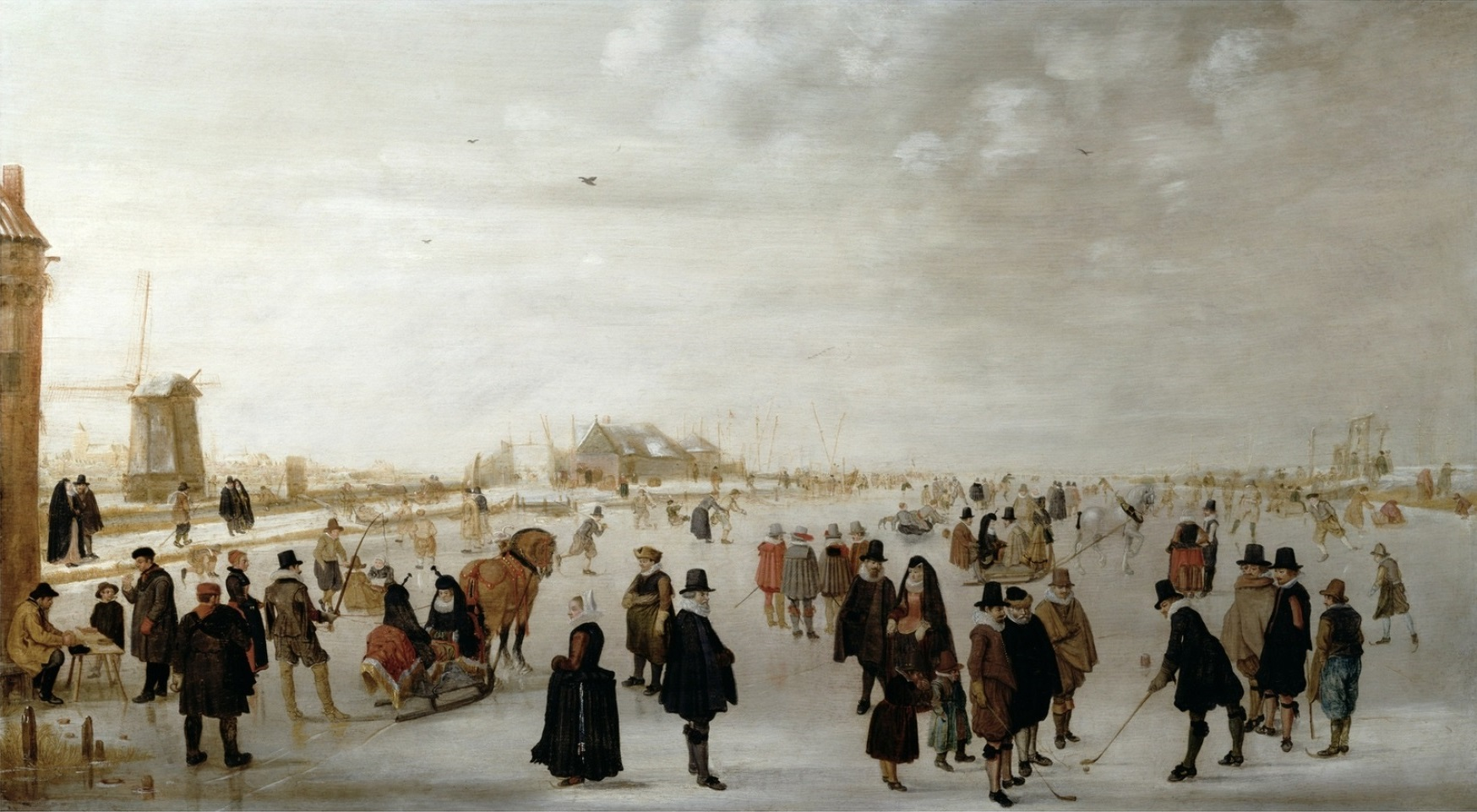
Winter Landscape, c. 1615, with women wearing a huik, by Hendrick Avercamp

The cloak was called a 'huyck' (huik in modern Dutch), and it was a black garment that was worn by upperclass women when they went outside the home from the 16th century onwards. It is unknown why the color blue of the huik plays a role in the proverb. That the huik was meant to be blue was emphasized not only by the common title, but also by the use of a black huik elsewhere in the painting. This secondary appearance of the huik can also be seen in the Hogenberg and Galle engravings, though it doesn't play a central role.
