= Émilie Ambre =

French opera singer (1849–1898)

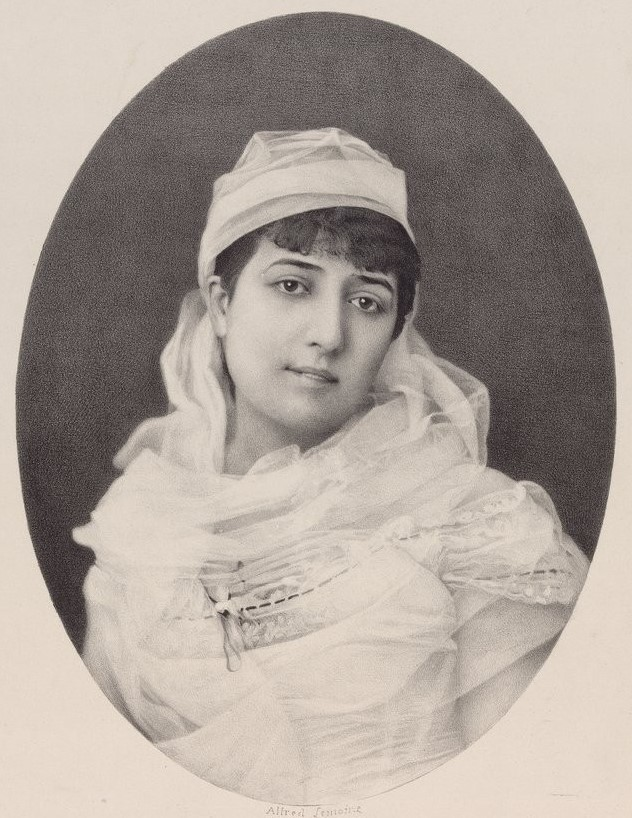
- Born: Émilie Gabrielle Adèle Ambroise; June 6, 1849; Oran, French Algeria
- Died: April 13, 1898 (aged 48); Paris, France
- Occupation: Opera singer (soprano)

Émilie Gabrielle Adèle Ambre (née Ambroise; 6 June 1849 – 13 April 1898) was a French opera singer who performed leading soprano roles in Europe and North America and later became a singing teacher. Born in French Algeria and trained at the Marseilles Conservatory, she was for several years the mistress of William III of the Netherlands. She had a son Robert by her next lover Gaston de Beauplan, but the relationship eventually foundered after their return from the financially disastrous 1880–1881 American tour de Beauplan had organized to showcase her talents. Following her retirement from the stage in 1890, Ambre opened a singing school in Paris with the composer Emile Bouichère and married him in 1894. As a singer, she was particularly known for her performances as Violetta, Manon, and Aida, but is primarily remembered today as the subject of Édouard Manet's portrait of her as Carmen.

== King's mistress: from Algeria to the stages of Paris ==
Émilie Gabrielle Adèle Ambre was born in Place Kléber, Oran, French Algeria on 6 June 1849. She was from a prosperous French family. (Note: During her American tours, a variety of fanciful accounts of her parentage and youth in North Africa were published in the local press. These included assertions that she was a "Moorish Italian", that her mother was Arab or half-Arab, that as a young girl Ambre played serenades on the zither and sang to children in the desert, that she was the niece of the "Emperor of Morocco", and that she had an affair with a French diplomat in Algeria but left him for the Khedive of Egypt and when she tired of the Khedive went to France in search of the diplomat, but unable to find him, enrolled in the Marseilles Conservatory instead.) After her father's death when she was sixteen, she went to France to study at the Marseilles Conservatory and made her debut in that city. She then went to Paris for further training with Gustave-Hippolyte Roger and first appeared there at the Opéra-Comique in La fille du régiment, after which she was engaged to sing in Geneva, Bruges, Brussels, The Hague, and Amsterdam. According to the French press at the time, she appeared in Amsterdam in the 1876/1877 season to great success in the title roles of Mignon, Carmen, and Ernest Guiraud's Piccolino, and a brilliant future was predicted for her.

It was while singing in the Netherlands that she met King William III and became his mistress. He conferred the title "Comtesse d'Ambroise" on her and bought her extravagant jewels as well as a lavishly appointed country house in Meudon outside Paris where the couple often sojourned. After the death of his estranged wife Queen Sophie in June 1877, William installed Ambre in the late queen's chambers and announced that he was planning a morganatic marriage to her. As chronicled by August Willem Philip Weitzel, the opposition from his ministers and the Dutch press was intense. He was eventually persuaded to end the relationship and in 1879 married Princess Emma of Waldeck.

During the conflict between the Dutch king and his ministers, Ambre returned to the French operatic stage. In 1878, she sang Violetta in La traviata at the Théâtre-Italien and the title role in Aida for its first performance by the Paris Opera. She also sang at Her Majesty's Theatre in London in November and December of that year as Violetta in La traviata, Marguerite in Faust and Gilda in Rigoletto. In 1879 she was back in Paris appearing as Juliette in Richard d'Ivry's Les amants de Vérone at the Théâtre de la Gaîté-Lyrique.

== American tours and a "misalliance" ==
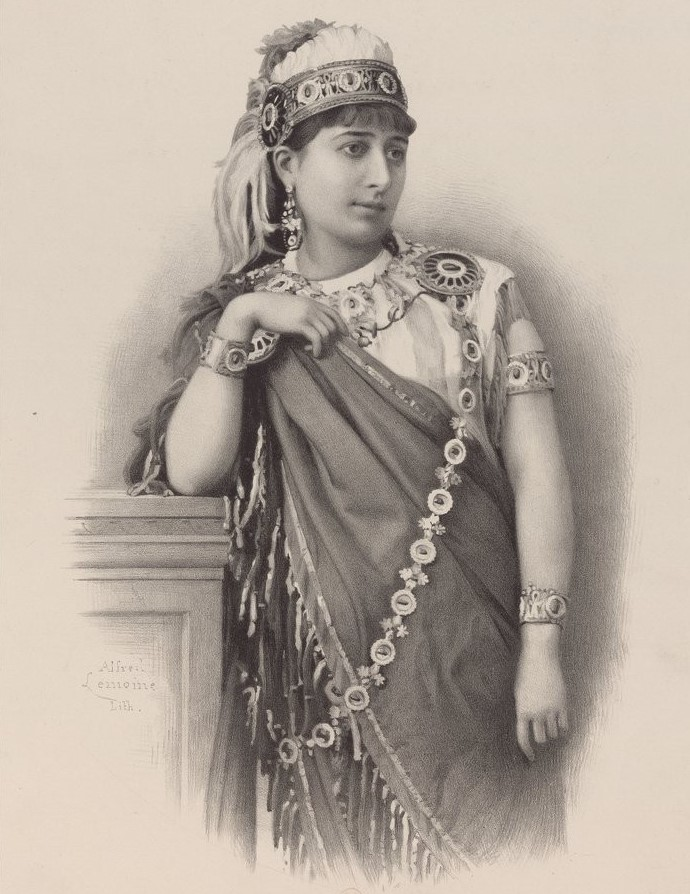
Ambre as Aida, Paris 1878

Colonel Mapleson, the impresario of Her Majesty's Theatre, recruited Ambre for his troupe's American tour which ran from November 1879 to March 1880. She appeared in New York, Philadelphia, Chicago, St. Louis, Detroit, and Cleveland with the company, reprising her roles in La traviata and Aida and also singing the title role in Carmen and Valentine in Les Huguenots. She was accompanied on the tour by her lover Gaston de Beauplan (1849–1890). Gaston de Beauplan, whose full name was Amédée Gaston Ludovic Rousseau de Beauplan, was the son of Arthur de Beauplan and the grandson of Amédée de Beauplan, both of whom were playwrights and composers active in the musical and theatrical life of Paris. Through the intervention of Jules Simon, the French Interior Minister, he was employed as a functionary in the Interior Ministry and later promoted to the post of Director of Theatre Companies. However, his family considered him an irresponsible spendthrift and strongly disapproved of his "misalliance" with Ambre. At one point they brought an unsuccessful court case to have him declared mentally incompetent. (Note: For a detailed account of the attempt by Gaston de Beauplan's family to have him declared insane by the French courts, see: Heulhard, Arthur (1886). Bravos & sifflets, pp. 258–264. A. Dupret)

A few months after their return from the Mapleson tour, de Beauplan conceived the idea of forming his own French opera troupe with Ambre as its star soprano. They assembled a complete opera company consisting of 169 people—singers, actors, supernumeraries, a chorus, orchestra, corps de ballet, seamstresses, hairdressers, and stagehands—and set off for America in October 1880. The tour began with a successful repertory season in New Orleans. However, with severe rainstorms and flooding and competition from Sarah Bernhardt's theatre troupe who were also performing there, the box office receipts declined considerably by February 1881. After leaving New Orleans, the troupe toured to Cincinnati, Chicago, and Philadelphia, but the box office receipts in those cities did not even cover their expenses. By the time they had reached New York in May 1881, the five main singers refused to perform unless they were paid their back wages. The company collapsed. Ambre pawned some of her jewels to pay the most pressing debts and departed for France accompanied by the troupe's leading tenor, Gabriel Tournié. The hapless de Beauplan was left behind to sort out the repatriation of the company's remaining members.

The New York press had portrayed her precipitous departure with Tournié, whose wife also sang with the company, as an "elopement". On her return to France, Ambre gave a lengthy interview to the Parisian journalist Louis Besson in Le Voleur. In the interview, which was also covered in the American press, she denied all rumours of an elopement and said that Tournie and his wife were now together in France. Nevertheless, she claimed that the intense publicity surrounding the faux scandal had prompted Mapleson to offer her a further engagement with his company. She also told Besson that she had no interest in singing in the French provinces and was considering a tour in Italy. As for de Beauplan, she said that after sorting out the company's problems in New York, he would be leaving for Colorado "to work in the mines". Instead, he returned to France and by October 1881 Ambre and de Beauplan were together at her house in Meudon.

== Singing in the provinces and later years ==
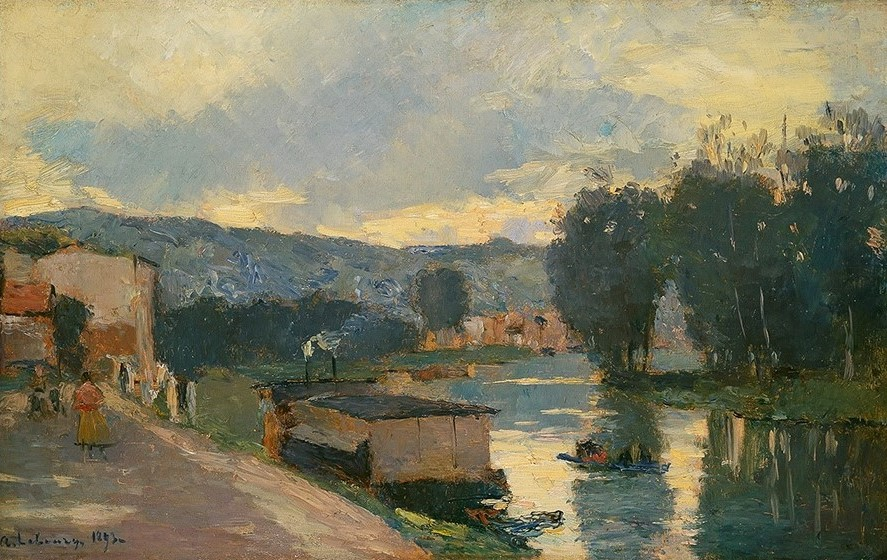
The river Seine at Meudon in a painting by Albert Lebourg

Ambre gave birth to a son, Robert, in Meudon on 10 February 1882. On his birth certificate, he was listed as the son of Gaston de Beauplan and an "unnamed mother" (mère non dénommée). She and de Beauplan were forced to sell many of the expensive furnishings in the Meudon house and much of its land to pay the remainder of their debts from the disastrous American tour. Despite her earlier comments to Louis Besson, Ambre left her son with de Beauplan in Meudon and began touring in French provincial opera houses, returning only in the summers. During that period she achieved particular success as the heroine in Massenet's Manon. In 1885 her autobiographical novel Une Diva was published by Paul Ollendorff. In it she mused on the role of women in the theatre, love, marriage, and the thinly-disguised people who had figured in her career. Paul Ginisty wrote in Gil Blas, that had she written a true autobiography, it would have been even more exciting than the novel.

Eventually, de Beauplan grew tired of Ambre's frequent absences and their difficult relationship and left Meudon to settle in Montpellier. He died there in February 1890. He was 41 years old at the time of his death and addicted to morphine. In June of that year, Ambre formally recognized the eight-year-old Robert as her son. She retired from the stage and opened a singing school in Paris with Émile Bouichère. A handsome man twelve years her junior, Bouichère was an organist and composer who served as the maître de chapelle of Sainte-Trinité church. The couple married in 1894, but Bouichère died a year later at the age of 35. After Bouichère's death, Ambre continued with her singing school and musical soirees but led an increasingly lonely life.

She died in Paris on 13 April 1898. According to an article in Le Ménestrel published four years after her death, she had committed suicide with an overdose of morphine. Her friend Marie Colombier recalled that Ambre's funeral was even sadder than her death. When the carriage bearing her flower-covered coffin arrived at Père Lachaise Cemetery to be buried in Bouichère's tomb, the mourners were told that the requisite fees had not been paid. The coffin was placed on the pavement while the mourners gathered together the 200 francs requested. Checking the accounts again, the cemetery official requested an additional 100 francs. The mourners had exhausted their cash, and Ambre had to be temporarily interred in the common grave.

Although it had been many years since she had last performed in the United States, her death was reported in several newspapers there. The magazine Brooklyn Life wrote in August 1898:

The ephemeral qualities of operatic success are once more exemplified by the case of Emilie Ambre. In the early days of the Mapleson regime she made something of a sensation in New York, particularly as Aida, a role to which her very dark complexion was well suited. Now she is dead. Not long ago her effects were auctioned off at the Hotel Drouot. The whole civilized world heard the news, but there was scarcely a sigh from the public, for the singer had been absolutely forgotten.

Ambre's son Robert de Beauplan became a journalist, critic, and essayist. A fervent collaborator and propagandist for the Vichy government during Germany's occupation of France, he was sentenced to death as a traitor immediately after the war. The sentence was commuted to life imprisonment partly through the intervention of his daughter Claude who had been a member of the Free French Forces in London. When his health deteriorated in 1950, he was released from prison on medical grounds and died in 1951.

== Manet's portrait ==
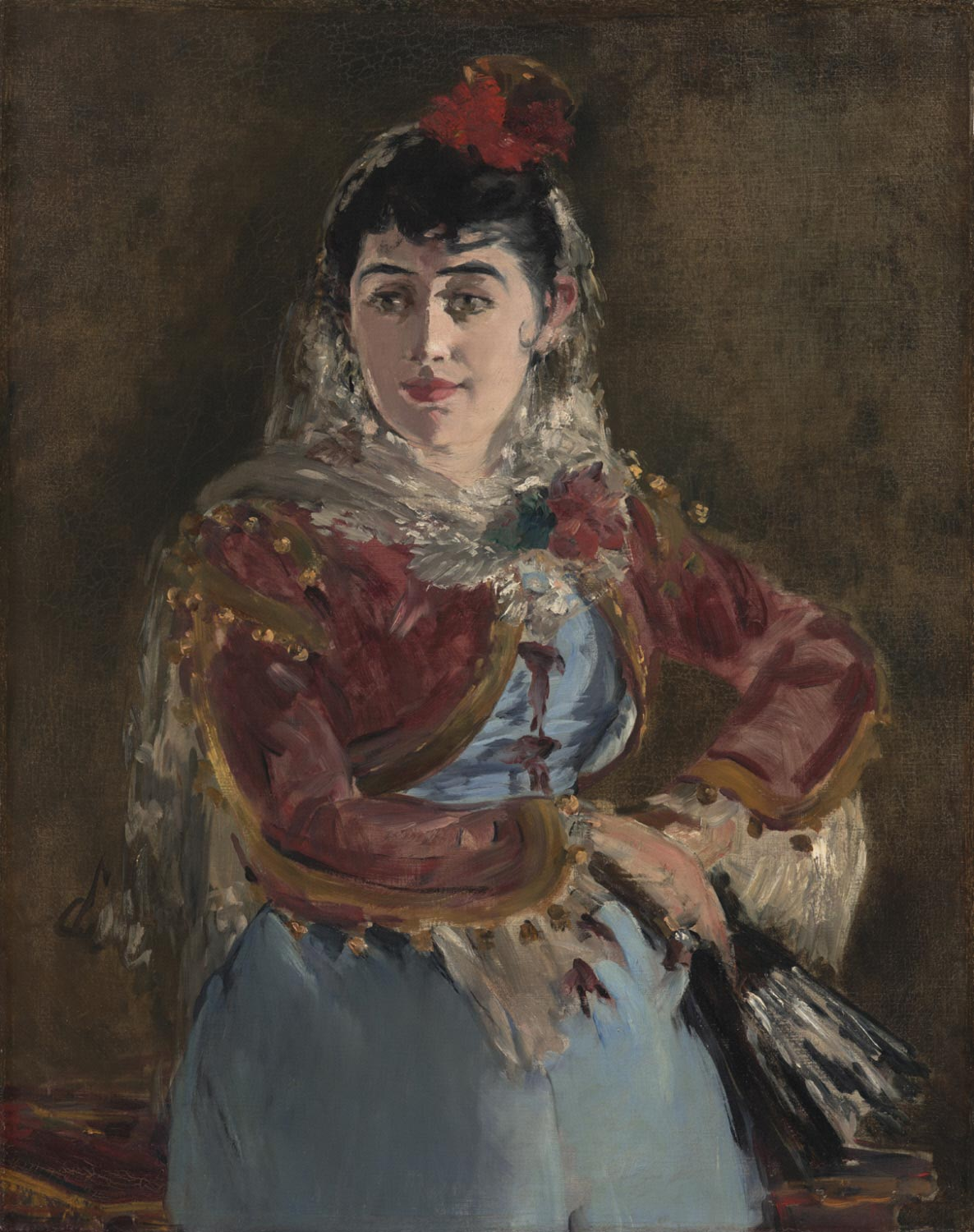
Manet's Emilie Ambre as Carmen

Édouard Manet first met Ambre in the summer of 1879 when he was taking treatment at a spa near her estate in Meudon. She and de Beauplan, who were planning to leave for Mapleson's American tour in November of that year, offered to take Manet's The Execution of Emperor Maximilian with them and arrange its exhibition in New York and Boston. Although painted in 1869, it had never been exhibited before. In the summer and early autumn of 1880, as she and de Beauplan were planning their second American tour, Manet and his family stayed in a house in Meudon rented from Ambre. There he painted a portrait of her as the Spanish gypsy heroine of Bizet's opera Carmen.

Ambre had sung Carmen in the Netherlands early in her career and during the 1879–1880 Mapleson tour, but she had never sung it in France. The opera had not been seen in Paris since its world premiere at the Opéra-Comique in 1875, although it had several subsequent stagings in the French provinces. Keen to perform it in Paris, she asked Manet to write his friend Antonin Proust and urge him to pressure the Opéra-Comique to revive it for her. A Paris revival with Ambre never happened, (Note: The Opéra-Comique finally revived Carmen in April 1883 but with Adèle Isaac in the title role.) but she did sing the role again on her 1880–1881 American tour. Scholars differ as to whether the portrait was done at Ambre's request or as a thank-you gesture from Manet for having organized the exhibition of The Execution of Emperor Maximilian the previous year. During the late summer of 1880 Manet wrote to Eva Gonzalès that he would be working on the painting every day as Ambre was leaving for America that October. However, the portrait remained in the artist's possession. It was in the inventory of works inherited by Manet's widow Suzanne on his death in 1883.

The portrait reflects Manet's affinity for Spanish subjects which was most pronounced in his early career, but a theme he occasionally returned to in his final years. In addition to the 1880 portrait of Ambre, he painted several Goyaesque tambourines in 1878–1879, including Spanish Dancers and Dancer and Majo, some of which were shown in an exhibition at La Vie Moderne in April 1880. Ambre's pose and costume in Manet's three-quarter portrait are very similar to that of Nadar's photograph of Célestine Galli-Marié, the original singer of Carmen. The brush strokes are very broad, especially for the dress and the hand holding the fan. The most detailed area is the singer's face which is outlined in white with one half noticeably brighter than the other giving the appearance of her standing before stage-lights. The same effect can be seen in Manet's 1877 portrait of Jean-Baptiste Faure as Hamlet.

Emilie Ambre as Carmen was bought from the Manet estate in 1883 by the widow of Thomas A. Scott and remained in the Scott family until 1964 when their collection was donated to the Philadelphia Museum of Art. It remains on permanent display there and has also been shown at several international exhibitions. It was seen in New York and Paris in 2002–2003 as part of Manet/Velázquez: The French Taste for Spanish Painting, a major exhibition organized by the Metropolitan Museum of Art, and then travelled to the Museo del Prado in October 2003 for the museum's first retrospective of Manet's work. In 2012–2013 it was shown at the Toledo Museum of Art in Ohio and the Royal Academy of Art in London as part of Manet: Portraying Life, an exhibition devoted entirely to Manet's portraits.
