= Alphonse Thys =

French composer

- Born: 8 March 1807; Paris
- Died: 1 August 1879 (aged 72); Bois-Guillaume
- Occupation: Composer

Alphonse Thys (8 March 1807 – 1 August 1879) was a 19th-century French composer.

== Short biography ==
He studied harmony at the Conservatoire de Paris with Émile Bienaimé and composition with Henri-Montan Berton.

In 1833, he won the first Prix de Rome with his cantata Le Contrebandier espagnol. He lived two years at the Villa Medicis in Rome, then settled in Paris as a composer. He wrote some popular songs such as La Belle limonadière or La Nuit au sérail.

He wrote operas for the Théâtre national de l'Opéra-Comique as well as mixed choirs. When he was a teacher of music, he used Pierre Galin's method (the Galin-Paris-Chevé system), and in 1873 wrote the foreword of the book Histoire anécdotique de la méthode Galin-Paris-Chevé. His most famous pupil was Edmond de Polignac.

He was Pauline Thys's father.

== Works ==
His abundant production includes:

- 1835: Alda, opera in one act, with Jean-François Bayard and Paul Duport
- 1839: Le Roi Margot, comédie à ariettes
- 1841: L'Avantage d'être goujon !, bêtise aquatique in four couplets, lyrics by Justin Cabassol
- 1842: La Discrète, lyrics by Émile Barateau
- 1844: Oreste et Pylade, opéra comique in one act
- 1844: Marquise et soubrette, mélodies, lyrics by Victor Mabille
- 1844: Le Nuage !, mélodie, lyrics by Marc Constantin
- 1845: L'Amazone, opéra comique in one act
- 1846: Le Distrait, song, lyrics by Victor Mabille
- 1848: La Sournoise, opéra comique in one act
- 1849: Enfant n'y crois pas, lyrics by Henriette Chardonneau
- 1849: La Famille, romance
- 1850: Les Echos de Rosine, salon opera with piano, poem by Étienne Tréfeu
- 1864: Les Plaisirs de la chasse, for male choir
- 1864: Bonne Nuit, nocturne à deux voix, lyrics by Eugène Roch
- 1873: 12 Fantaisies for oboe and piano
- 6 Variations pour piano sur l'air de la Tyrolienne
- undated: La Muse comique, collection of ditties, songs, bawdy, pastoral, roundels, comic scenes, drinking songs and light songs with and without talking, for piano and voice, lyrics by Pierre-Antoine-Augustin de Piis, (with Étienne Arnaud, Amédée de Beauplan, François-Auguste Gevaert, Aristide Hignard, Paul de Kock, Adrien Lagard, Charles Lecocq, Sylvain Mangeant, Charles Pourny, Loïsa Puget, Victor Robillard and Jean-Pierre Solié.

== Bibliography ==
- Clement Scott, Bernard Edward Joseph Capes, Charles Eglington, The Theatre, vol. 3, 1879, p. 118
- William Hayman Cummings, Biographical Dictionary of Musicians, 1892, p. 64
- Gustave Vapereau, Dictionnaire universel des contemporains, 1893
- T. J. Walsh, Second Empire Opera: The Théâtre Lyrique, Paris 1851–1870, 1981, p. 339
- Procès-verbaux de l'Académie des Beaux-arts: 1830–1834, 2004, p. 255
