= Tempest in a teapot =

English idiom

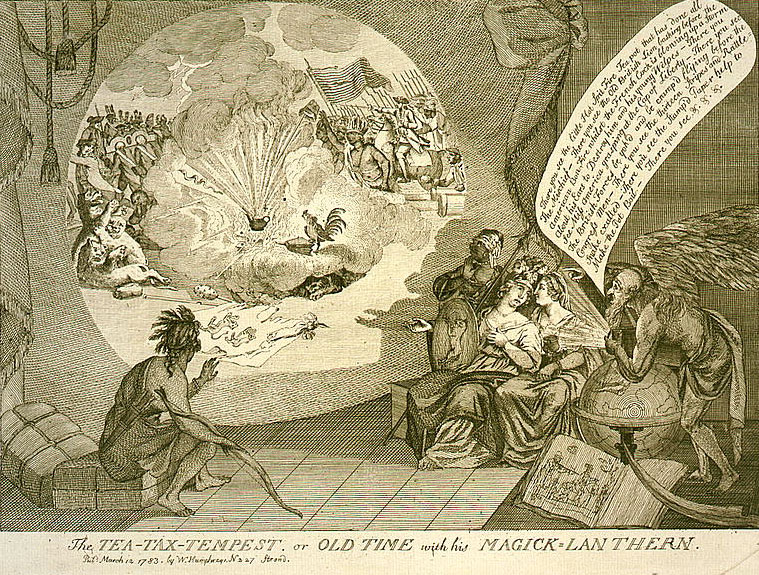
Carl Guttenberg's 1778 Tea-Tax Tempest, with exploding teapot.

Tempest in a teapot (American English), or also phrased as storm in a teacup (British English), or tempest in a teacup, is an idiom meaning a small event that has been exaggerated out of proportion. There are also lesser known or earlier variants, such as storm in a cream bowl, tempest in a glass of water, storm in a wash-hand basin, and storm in a glass of water.

== Etymology ==
Cicero, in the first century BC, in his De Legibus, used a similar phrase in Latin, possibly the precursor to the modern expressions, Excitabat enim fluctus in simpulo ut dicitur Gratidius, translated: "For Gratidius raised a tempest in a ladle, as the saying is". Then in the early third century AD, Athenaeus, in the Deipnosophistae, has Dorion ridiculing the description of a tempest in the Nautilus of Timotheus by saying that he had seen a more formidable storm in a boiling saucepan. The phrase also appeared in its French form une tempête dans un verre d'eau ('a tempest in a glass of water'), to refer to the popular uprising in the Republic of Geneva near the end of the eighteenth century.

One of the earliest occurrences in print of the modern version is in 1815, where Britain's Lord Chancellor Thurlow, sometime during his tenure of 1783–1792, is quoted as referring to a popular uprising on the Isle of Man as a "tempest in a teapot". Also Lord North, Prime Minister of Great Britain, is credited for popularizing this phrase as characterizing the outbreak of American colonists against the tax on tea. This sentiment was then satirized in Carl Guttenberg's 1778 engraving of the Tea-Tax Tempest (shown above right), where Father Time flashes a magic lantern picture of an exploding teapot to America on the left and Britannia on the right, with British and American forces advancing towards the teapot. Just a little later, in 1825, in the Scottish journal Blackwood's Edinburgh Magazine, a critical review of poets Hogg and Campbell also included the phrase "tempest in a teapot".

The first recorded instance of the British English version, "storm in teacup", occurs in Catherine Sinclair's Modern Accomplishments in 1838. There are several instances though of earlier British use of the similar phrase "storm in a wash-hand basin".

== See also ==
- American and British English differences
- Make a mountain out of a molehill
- The Mountain in Labour gives birth to a mouse
