= Major Farm Meadow =

Protected area in Suffolk, England

Coordinates: 52.309°N 1.108°E

- Site of Special Scientific Interest
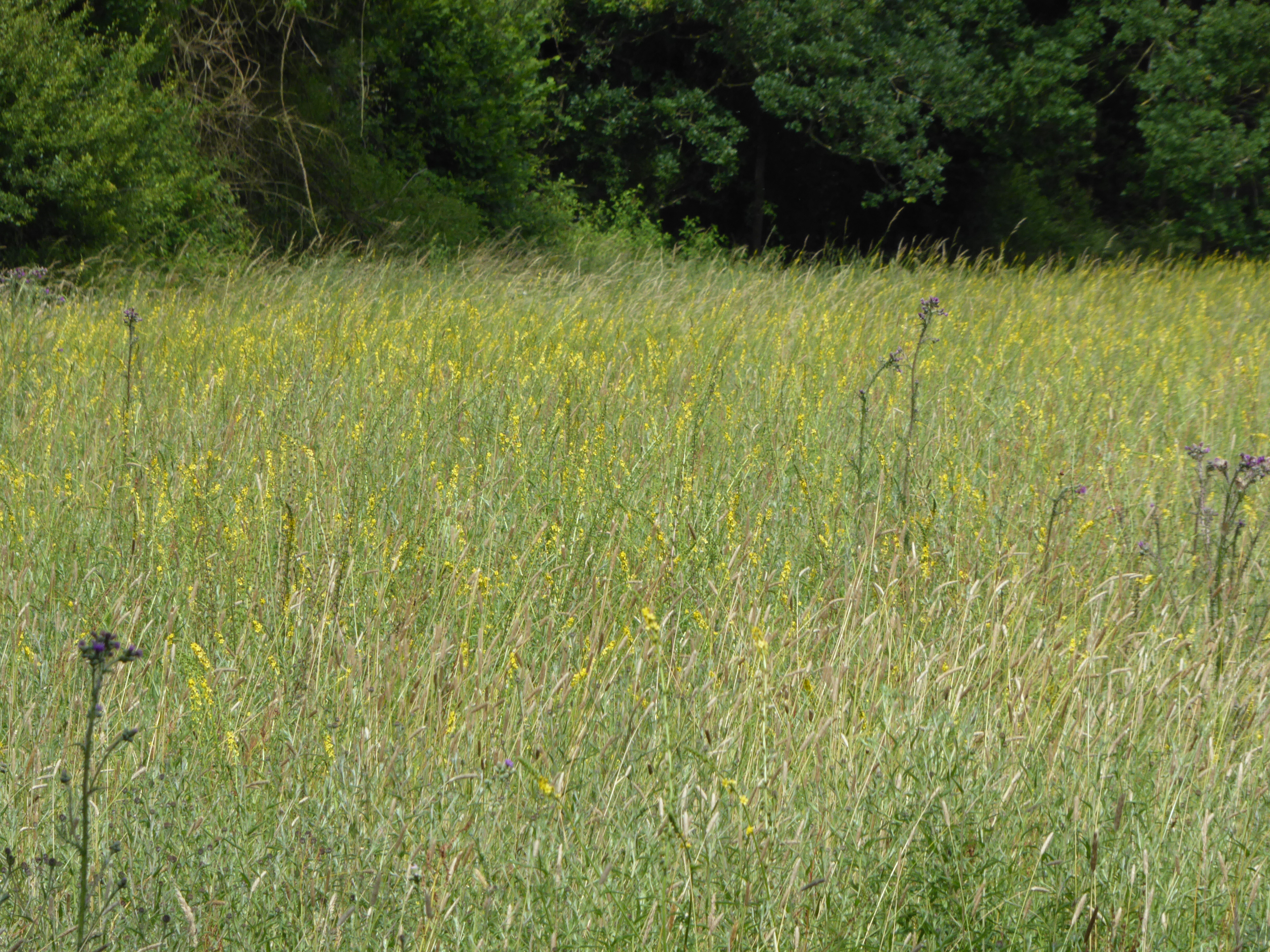
- Location of Major Farm Meadow.
- Area of search: Suffolk
- Grid reference: TM 120 724
- Interest: Biological
- Area: 1.8 hectares
- Notification date: 1986
- Location map: Magic Map

Major Farm Meadow is a 1.8-hectare (4.4-acre) biological Site of Special Scientific Interest south-west of Eye in Suffolk.

This is one of the few surviving unimproved hay meadows in the county. It is damp grassland on boulder clay, with diverse flora and many molehills. Flowering plants include cowslip, twayblade and green-winged orchid, and there is a mature specimen of the rare black poplar.

The site is private land with no public access.
