= Make a mountain out of a molehill =

Idiom

Making a mountain out of a molehill is an idiom referring to over-reactive, histrionic behaviour where a person makes too much of a minor issue. It seems to have come into existence in the 16th century.

== Metaphor ==
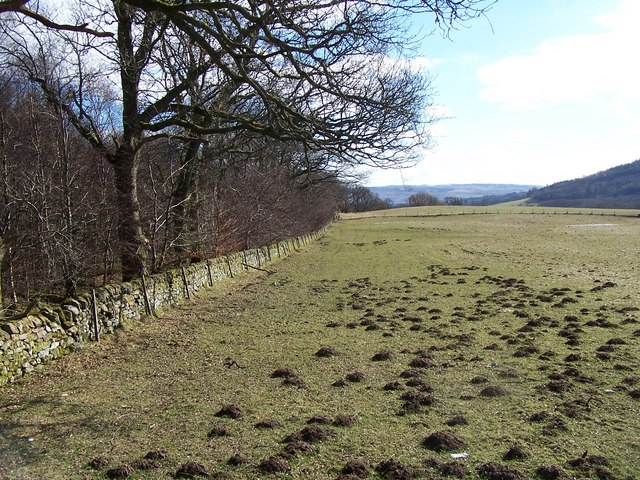
Molehills at the foot of a Scottish mountain

The idiom is a metaphor for the common behaviour of responding disproportionately to something - usually an adverse circumstance. One who makes a mountain out of a molehill is said to be greatly exaggerating the severity of the situation. In cognitive psychology, this form of distortion is called magnification or overreacting. The phrase itself is so common that a study by psychologists found that with respect to familiarity and image value, it ranks high among the 203 common sayings they tested.

Similar idioms include much ado about nothing and making a song and dance about nothing. The meaning finds its opposite in the fable about the mountain in labour that gives birth to a mouse. In the former too much is made of little; in the latter one is led to expect much, but with too little result. The two appear to converge in William Caxton's translation of the fable (1484), where he makes of the mountain "a hylle whiche beganne to tremble and shake by cause of the molle whiche delved it". In other words, he mimics the meaning of the fable by turning a mountain into a molehill. It was in the context of this bringing together of the two ideas that the English idiom grew.

== Origin ==
The earliest recorded use of the alliterative phrase making a mountain out of a molehill dates from 1548. The word mole was less than two hundred years old by then. Previous to that it had been known by its Old English name wand, which had slowly changed to want. A molehill was known as a wantitump, a word that continued in dialect use for centuries more. The former name of want was then replaced by mold(e)warp (meaning earth-thrower), a shortened version of which (molle) began to appear in the later 14th century and the word molehill in the first half of the 15th century.

The idiom is found in Nicholas Udall's translation of The first tome or volume of the Paraphrase of Erasmus vpon the newe testamente (1548) in the statement that "The Sophistes of Grece coulde through their copiousness make an Elephant of a flye, and a mountaine of a mollehill." The comparison of the elephant with a fly (elephantem ex musca facere) is an old Latin proverb that Erasmus recorded in his collection of such phrases, the Adagia, European variations on which persist. The mountain and molehill seem to have been added by Udall and the phrase has continued in popular use ever since. If the idiom was not coined by Udall himself, the linguistic evidence above suggests that it cannot have been in existence long.

== See also ==
- Tempest in a teapot
