= Pauline Thys =

French composer and librettist

Pauline Marie Elisa Thys [-Lebault] (1835–1909) was a French composer and librettist. She was born in Paris. Her father was the opéra comique composer Alphonse Thys (1807–1879). Initially she composed salon romances and light piano music in the tradition of Loïsa Puget, and, by the age of 20, had published her work with the music publisher Heugel. During Thys's lifetime, commentators viewed her as one of the best composers of the salon romance.

She subsequently turned to writing larger-scale musical works for the stage including operettas, opéra-comiques, and operas, including several for which she authored the libretto. These works were staged at the Opéra-Comique and at the Théâtre des Bouffes-Parisiens among other venues. Her four-act opera Judith is cited in American essayist Theodore Stranton's The Woman Question in Europe as an example of French women's achievements in music. Excerpts from Judith were frequently performed in public. Her opera Le Mariage de Tabarin was staged to great success on December 5, 1855, at the Theatre Royal in Florence and in numerous other cities.

In addition to her musical work, Thys was also a novelist: she published the novel Les bonnes bêtes under the pseudonym Mme. M. Du Coin.

In 1877, she founded the Association des femmes artistes et professeurs, an organization whose aim was to address the obstacles faced by women and to draw attention to their work. The group's first concert, presented on March 11, 1877, featured the work of composers Delphine Ugalde, Clémence de Grandval, Amélie Perronnet, and excerpts from Thys's comic opera Le Mariage de Tabarin. In 1883, she became a Chevalier de l'Ordre des Palmes académiques.

Thys married Charles Lebault in June 1860 and the couple divorced in 1886. Thys married her second husband Charles Marque du Coin in 1886. Following his death in 1906, Thys relocated to Forest-Les-Bruxelles in Belgium, where she lived for the rest of her life.

== Selected works ==
Stage

- La Pomme de Turquie, operetta, 1 act (1857)
- Quand Dieu est dans le ménage, Dieu le garde, operetta (1860)
- La Perruque du Bailli, operetta (1860)
- Le Roi de Cocagne, opéra-comique, 2 acts (libretto: Pierre Jean Baptiste Choudard Desforges) (1862)
- Manette, opéra-comique (1865)
- La Congiura di Chevreuse, opéra (1876)
- Le Cabaret du Pot-cassé, operetta, 2 acts (1878)
- Le Fruit vert, opéra-comique, 3 acts
- Nedgeya, operetta (libretto: P. Nemo) (1880)
- Le Mariage de Tabarin (French version of her own La Congiura di Chevreuse), opéra-comique, 3 acts (libretto by Thys) (1885)
- Judith, tragédie lyrique

Songs

- Chanson créole (1856)
- Le Chant du gondolier (1856)
- Le Souvenir (1856)
- Les Larmes sont soeurs (1858)
- Ma Pendule (1858)
- Les Chants de la sirène (1859)
- Six Fables de La Fontaine for solo voice (1861, reprinted 1872); includes 1. L'Amour et la folie; 2. Le Satyre et le passant; 3. Les Médecins; 4. L'Huître et les plaideurs; 5. La Montagne qui accouche; 6. La Femme noyée.
- Tes vingt ans (1861)
- La Neige tombe sur nos toits (1862)
- Le Pays de Cocagne (1862)
- Jeunes filles et papillons (1864)
- Qu’en dites-vous, Monsieur Genniès (1862, reprinted 1872)
- Quand on est vieux (1863)
- Mignonne, voici le jour (1884)

Piano

- Air havanais (1875)
