= The Mountain in Labour =

Fable by Aesop

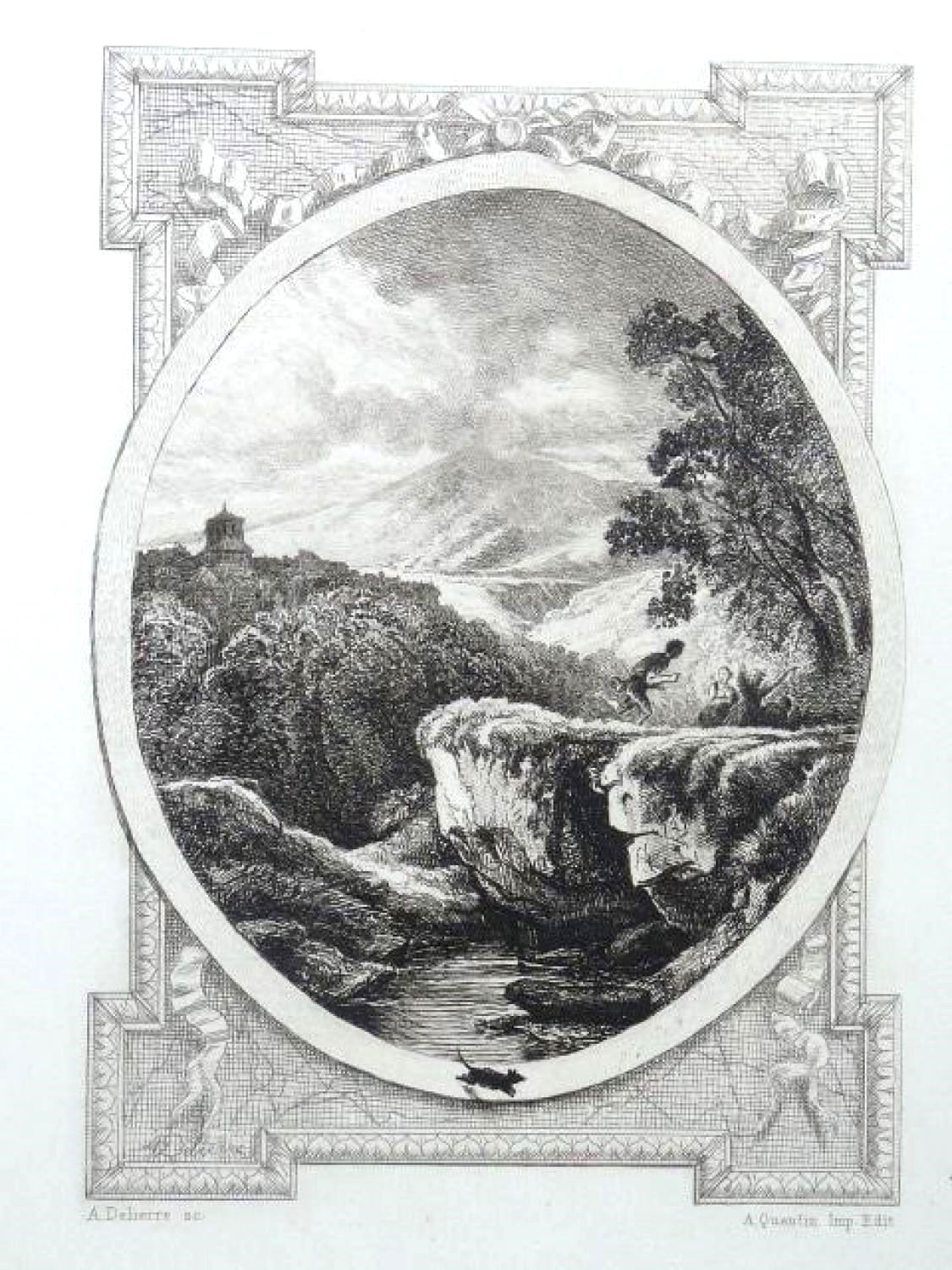
Auguste Delierre's 1883 etching of "The Mountain in Labour"

The Mountain in Labour is one of Aesop's Fables and appears as number 520 in the Perry Index. The story became proverbial in Classical times and was applied to a variety of situations. It is taken to refer to speech acts which promise much but deliver little, especially in literary and political contexts. In more modern times the satirical intention behind the fable was given greater emphasis following Jean de la Fontaine's interpretation of it. Illustrations to the text underlined its ironical application particularly and went on to influence cartoons referring to the fable elsewhere in Europe and America.

== The Classical fable ==
The earliest surviving version of the tale is in a four-line Latin poem by Phaedrus:

Mons parturibat, gemitus immanes ciens,
eratque in terris maxima expectatio.
At ille murem peperit. Hoc scriptum est tibi,
qui, magna cum minaris, extricas nihil.

"A mountain was in labour, uttering immense groans,
and on earth there was very great expectation.
But it gave birth to a mouse. This has been written for you,
who, though you threaten great things, accomplish nothing."

But the most well-known mention of the fable appears in Horace's epistle on The Art of Poetry. Discussing what to avoid in a poem's opening, he recommends a writer not begin an epic poem in too grandiose a way, to avoid what follows being an anticlimax:

nec sic incipies, ut scriptor cyclicus olim:
"fortunam Priami cantabo et nobile bellum."
quid dignum tanto feret hic promissor hiatu?
parturient montes, nascetur ridiculus mus.

And don't start like an old writer of epic cycles once did:
"Of Priam's fate I'll sing, and the greatest of Wars."
What could he produce to match his opening promise?
Mountains will labour: what's born? A ridiculous mouse!

(Ars Poetica, 136–139)

Some editions of the poem have the present tense parturiunt instead of the future parturient. The future parturient is found in all the chief manuscripts and also in quotations of the line in Probus, Servius, and Jerome. Despite this, Richard Bentley preferred to read parturiunt, arguing that like other verbs ending in -urio the present tense already has an inherently future meaning ("they wish to give birth", "they are about to give birth"). However, A. S. Wilkins in his edition defends the future tense parturient, explaining the line as meaning "if you do begin so, it will be a case of 'Mountains in labour, and out comes a mouse'."

Horace treats the proverb humorously. One indication of this is the unusual rhythm, with the monosyllable mus placed at the end of a line. The second is that the word MVS 'mouse' comes twice: once at the end of line 139, and the other time as a telestic in the final letters of lines 137–9, which is thought to be a joke on Horace's part.

A number of writers of Greek origin also alluded to the fable. Plutarch described it as an "old proverb", and the Latin grammarian Porphyrio claimed that it was a Greek proverb that Horace had been quoting. One early version of the proverb in Greek is the following, which is quoted by Athenaeus:

ὤδινεν ὄρος, Ζεὺς δ' ἐφοβεῖτο, τὸ δ' ἔτεκεν μῦν
ṓdinen óros, Zeùs d' ephobeîto, tò d' éteken mûn
"A mountain was in labour, and Zeus was scared; but it gave birth to a mouse."

The Greek verse above, in the Sotadean metre, was supposedly said by the 4th-century BC Egyptian King Tachōs to the Spartan king Agesilaus, mocking him for his small stature. Agesilaus is said to have replied "One day I will appear to you like a lion!"

The verse is discussed in an article by Howard Jacobson (2007), in which he argues that the original proverb may have meant "she was in labour with a mountain, but in the end produced only a mouse".

The proverb has become known far from Europe. It is now “known as far away as Japan, as the proverb Taizan meido [shite], nezumi ippiki 'The mountain labors [and gives birth to] a mouse'." After Aesop's fables were taken to Japan by Christian missionaries in the 16th century, they became independently acculturated. In 1955 the saying "A great mountain is in labor and brings forth a rat and nothing else" was recorded as a native proverb. The proverb has also been translated into Indonesian.

== Mediaeval interpretations ==
During the Middle Ages the fable was retold many times without significant variation. The moral, however, was differently expressed and widened to specify a variety of circumstances to which it could be applied.

One of the Anglo-Latin prose collections going under the name Romulus gives a more extended interpretation, commenting that it warns one not to believe big talk, "for there are some who promise many more things than they deliver, and some who threaten much and perform least". This was more or less the conclusion on which William Caxton closed his ambiguous adaptation of the story as "a hylle whiche beganne to tremble and shake by cause of the molle whiche delved hit". There was, however, a closer English-language version of the fable told earlier by John Gower in his Confessio Amantis (c. 1390), with the advice not to be taken in by every empty rumour.

The actual line from Horace's poem (Parturient montes, nascetur ridiculus mus) was reproduced word for word in another mediaeval compilation of fables, the Ysopet-Avionnet. In this instance, however, the allusion was in connection with a different fable about Belling the cat, which has as its subject the ineffectiveness of political dialogue.

== Literature and politics ==
Two French poets followed Horace in applying the story to literary criticism. In the case of Nicolas Boileau, he was imitating the Roman poet's Ars Poetica in an Art Poétique (1674) of his own and made the allusion in much the same terms as had Horace. The words on which he closed, La montagne en travail enfante une souris (The mountain in labour gives birth to a mouse), soon became proverbial and were applied to any great hope that came to nothing. In the version of the tale published in 1668 in La Fontaine's Fables (V. 10), the first six lines are given to an updated relation in which it is imagined that the mountain is about to be delivered of a city bigger than Paris. That is followed by eight lines of reflection on the kind of author who promises great things although, as Norman Shapiro translates it, "What often comes to pass? – Just gas." La Fontaine's rhymed short line at the end imitates the vowel assonance of Horace's ridiculus mus in the original Latin. The title that La Fontaine gave this fable was La montagne qui accouche (The mountain giving birth), thus putting more emphasis on the situation rather than, as in Boileau, on the result.

Other poets shortly followed La Fontaine's lead in applying the fable to boastful authors. In his Nouveau recueil des fables d'Esope mises en français, avec le sens moral en quatre vers (1678), Isaac de Benserade provided an introductory prose version of the fable, succeeded by a dismissive quatrain which ended with a repetition of Boileau's pithy line, La montagne en travail enfante une souris. A German poet too, Friedrich von Hagedorn, imitated La Fontaine's fable in his 1738 collection Fabeln und Erzählungen. There, in Der Berg und der Poet (The Mountain and the Poet), he introduced a rhymester big with an epic idea: but "What arrives embroidered upon it? Like the mouse from a mountain, a sonnet." And when Lord Byron was updating allusions in his Hints from Horace (1811), he substituted a reference to a contemporary writer of bad epics, Robert Southey, "Whose epic mountains never fail in mice".

Samuel Croxall, in his prose retelling of the fable, cites "Great cry and little wool" as a parallel English proverb and applies the story to the empty promises of politicians. French writers too interpreted the fable in political terms. Eugène Desmares wrote an imitation of all La Fontaine's fables as Les métamorphoses du jour: ou, La Fontaine en 1831 in order to comment on the situation at the start of Louis Philippe I's reign. There "La Revolution qui accouche" addressed itself to disappointed expectations. Following the removal of Louis Philippe in 1848 and the declaration of a French Second Republic, the new political situation was again satirised in a one-act vaudeville, titled after the fable and written by Varin and Arthur de Beauplan.

== The fable in the arts ==
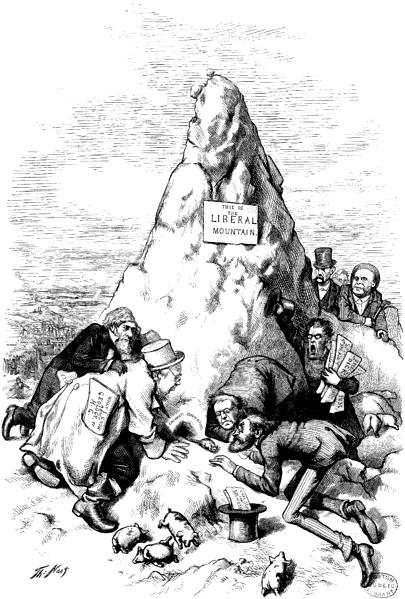
An American cartoon on the theme from Harper's Weekly, May 1872

=== Illustrations ===
La Fontaine had emphasised the satirical intent in Horace's original allusion to the fable of the mountain in labour, amplifying the ridiculousness of the situation. His illustrators were soon to follow suit. Jean-Baptiste Oudry's print of 1752 balances the agitated folk scurrying over the mountain slopes to the right with the mouse creeping warily over the rock face opposite. Gustave Doré broadens the satire with a parallel literary reference. In his 1867 engraving, Don Quixote is seated on an opposite ridge, expounding his surmises concerning the tremendous outcome expected to Sancho Panza, who is seated beside him. Ernest Griset's print of 1869 brings the satire up to date by picturing a crowd of pedants equipped with telescopes, measuring instruments and a primitive camera, all focussed into the distance on the minuscule mouse on the peak. An 1880 grisaille by Louis Eugène Lambert (1825–1909) unites Horace's interpretation of turbulence within the mountain as volcanic activity with the fable's association with literary criticism. There a mouse crouches on the cover of an ancient book and looks across to an eruption. Edward Julius Detmold, on the other hand, reverses the scale in his Aesop's Fables (1909) by picturing a huge mouse crouched upon a mountain outcrop.

The fable was also annexed to the satirical work of political cartoonists. The agitation that greeted the British Roman Catholic Relief Act in 1829 was satirised in a contemporary print by Thomas McLean (1788–1875) with the title "The Mountain in Labour – or much ado about nothing". In the United States several presidential nominees were made the butt of such cartoons, as were attempts to quell the disturbances preceding the Chinese Exclusion Act of 1882. In France the fable's title was applied to the parliamentary policy of Louis Philippe and to the foreign policy of Napoleon III.

=== Music ===
During the 18th century, Jean-Philippe Valette (d.1750) compiled a collection of moralising fables based on La Fontaine's and set to popular tunes of the day, Recueil de fables choisies dans le goût de La Fontaine, sur de petits airs et vaudevilles connus (1734). Among these was "The Mountain in Labour" (La montagne en travail), retold in three regular quatrains. This version was set to the air Nos plaisirs seront peu durable and provided with the moral Grand bruit, peu d'effet, the French equivalent of the English proverb "A great cry and little wool". There was also a new edition of La Vallette's work published in 1886 with a piano arrangement by Léopold Dauphin (1847–1925). The fable's text was also set by Emmanuel Clerc (b. 1963) as part of his work Fables (2013).

The words of La Fontaine's own fable were set by several other musicians, including:

- Jules Moinaux in 1846.
- Théodore Ymbert for two voices (1860).
- Pauline Thys as part of her Six Fables de La Fontaine (1861).
- Félix Godefroid for four unaccompanied men's voices (1861).
- Régis Campo as the second of his 5 Fables de La Fontaine (2005).
- Alain Savouret (b. 1942) in a setting for accompanied voice (2013).

In addition there was an English-language version set by Bob Chilcott as the fourth in his Aesop's Fables for piano and choir (2008); and a purely musical interpretation for small orchestra by Matt Fernald as the first part of his musical thesis composition, performed under the title An Evening with Aesop in 2013.
