= La poupée de Nuremberg =

Opera by Adolphe Adam

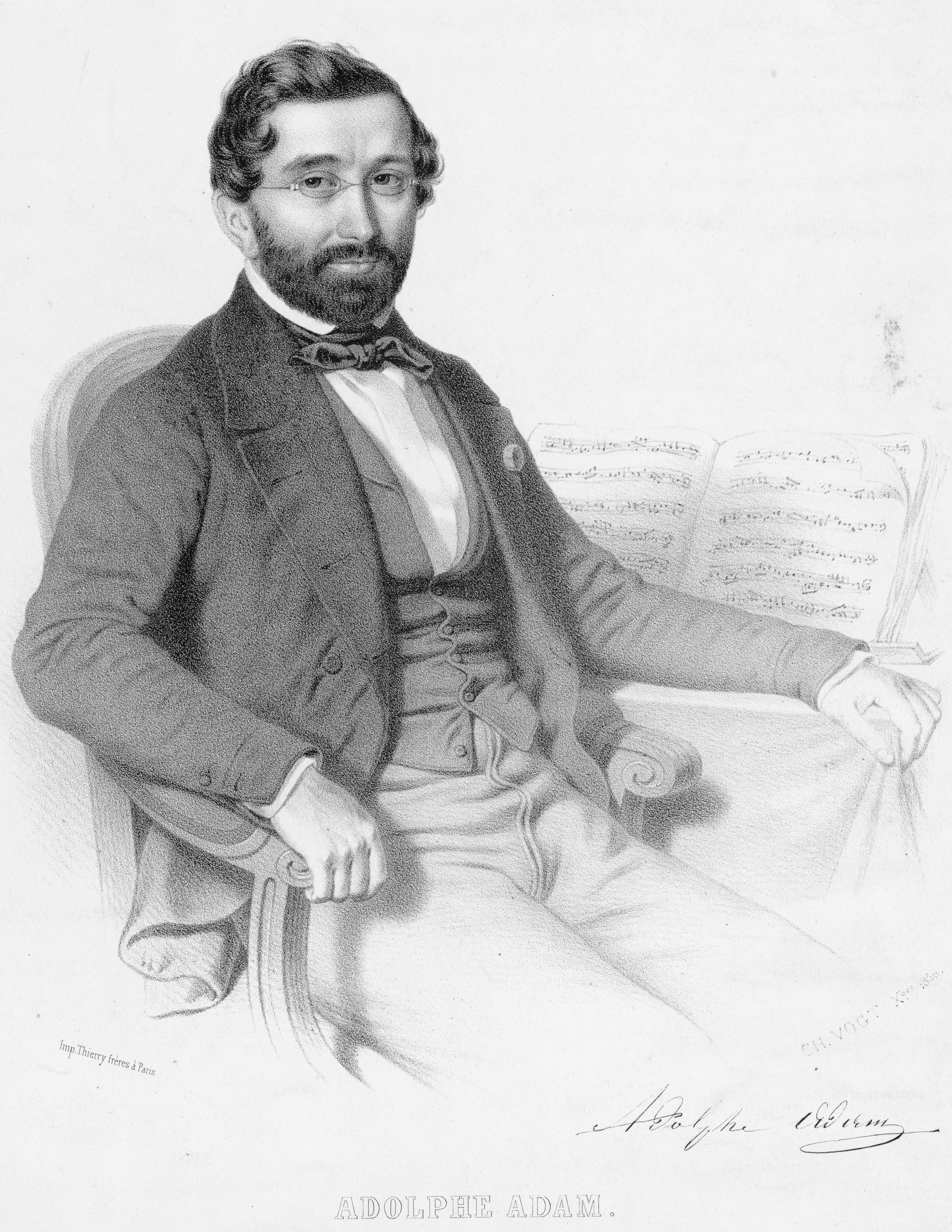
Adolphe Adam, Lithograph, 1850

La poupée de Nuremberg (English: The Nuremberg Doll) is a one-act opéra comique by Adolphe Adam to a libretto by Adolphe de Leuven and Arthur de Beauplan. The story is based on E. T. A. Hoffmann’s short story Der Sandmann. The work predates other stage adaptations of Hoffmann's tale, Coppélia and The Tales of Hoffmann.

It was first performed in Paris at the Théâtre Lyrique on 21 February 1852. Berlioz described it as "a whole emporium of waltzes, galops, potpourris… worthy of the Nuremberg fair." It was performed nearly one hundred times at the Théâtre Lyrique over the following 18 years.

== Roles ==
| Role | Voice type | Premiere cast, 21 February 1852 (Conductor: Alphonse Varney) |
|---|---|---|
| Bertha | soprano | Louise Rouvroy |
| Donathan | tenor | Horace Menjaud |
| Miller | baritone | Auguste-Alphonse Meillet |
| Cornélius | bass | Honoré Grignon |

== Synopsis ==
The scene takes place in a toy-shop at Nuremberg

Cornelius the owner, has an only son, Donathan, whom he loves despite the boy’s stupidity, while being unjust to his orphan nephew, Miller, whom he keeps like a servant, after having misappropriated the latter's inheritance. The old miser wants to obtain a wife for his son, a wife endowed with beauty and every virtue, and as he believes that such a paragon does not exist, has created a doll, which he hopes to endow with life by help of doctor Faust's magic book.

He awaits a stormy night to carry this out. Meanwhile he enjoys life and is prepares to go with Donathan to a masked ball, having sent his nephew supperless to bed. When they have left Miller reappears in the garb of Mephistopheles and clapping his hands, his fiancée Bertha, a poor seamstress soon enters. Sadly she tells her lover that she is unable to go to the ball, having given all her money, which she had meant to spend on a dress, to a poor beggar-women in the street. Miller, touched by his love's tender heart, determines to lay aside his mask, in order to stay at home with Bertha, when suddenly an idea strikes him. Remembering the doll, which his uncle keeps hidden in his closet, he shows it to Bertha, who delightedly slips into the doll's beautiful clothes which fit her perfectly.

Unfortunately Cornelius and his son are heard returning, while Bertha is still absent dressing. The night has grown stormy, and the old man deems it favourable for the spell. So he proceeds to open Faust's book and to begin the charm. Miller, who just had time to hide himself in the chimney, is driven out by his cousin's attempts to light a fire. He leaps down into the room and Cornelius and Donathan take him for none other than the Devil, Miller wearing his mask and being besides blackened by soot. Perceiving his uncle's terror, he profits by it, and at once beginning a conjuration he summons the doll – that is, Bertha in the doll's dress.

Father and son are delighted by her performances, but when she opens her mouth and reveals a very wilful and wayward character, Cornelius is less charmed. The doll demands food, and Mephistopheles indicates, that it is to be found in the kitchen. While the worthy pair go to fetch it, Mephistopheles converses with Bertha and vanishes into his room.

The doll now begins to lead a dance, which makes the toymaker's hair stand on end. She first throws the whole supper out of the window, following it with plate, crockery, toys etc. Then taking a drum, she begins to drill them, like a tambour-major, slapping their ears, mouths and cheeks when they try to approach her. At last, when they are quite worn out, she flies into the cupboard. But the father's spirit is roused, and he resolves to destroy his and the Devil's work. However he is stopped by Miller, who now makes his appearance, and seems greatly astonished at the uproar he finds in the middle of the night. He only wants to gain time for Bertha to change clothes and escape.

Resolutely the old man walks into the cupboard to slay the doll. He returns pale and trembling, believing to have destroyed her while asleep and seen her spirit escape through the window with fiendish laughter. Awed by his deed, he sees Miller returning, who confesses that he had found out the secret about the doll, and having accidentally broken it, had substituted a young girl. Cornelius, half dead with fright, sees himself already accused of murder; his only salvation seems to lie in his nephew's silence and instant flight. Miller is willing to leave the country, provided his uncle give him back his heritage, which consists of 10,000 thalers. After vain remonstrances the old man gives him the gold. Miller, having gained his ends, now introduces Bertha, and the wicked old fool and his son see too late, that they have been duped.
