= Carl Guttenberg =

German draughtsman and engraver (1743–1790)

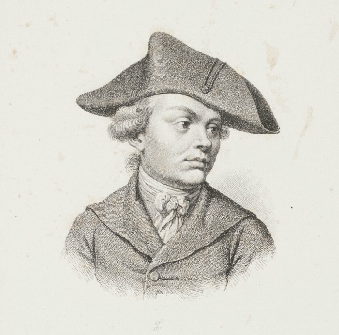
Self-portrait of Carl Guttenberg. Engraved by Friedrich Fleischman.

Carl Gottlieb Guttenberg (also Carl-Gottlieb, Carl Gottfried) (near Nuremberg, 21 August 1743 – Paris, 20 May 1790) was a German draughtsman and engraver. He received his initial training in Nuremberg and Bern before traveling to Paris in 1767 to study under the engraver Jean Georges Wille. After a brief sojourn in Basel (1772–73), he lived and worked in Paris, producing portraits, calligraphy, and illustrations from his own designs and those of other artists.

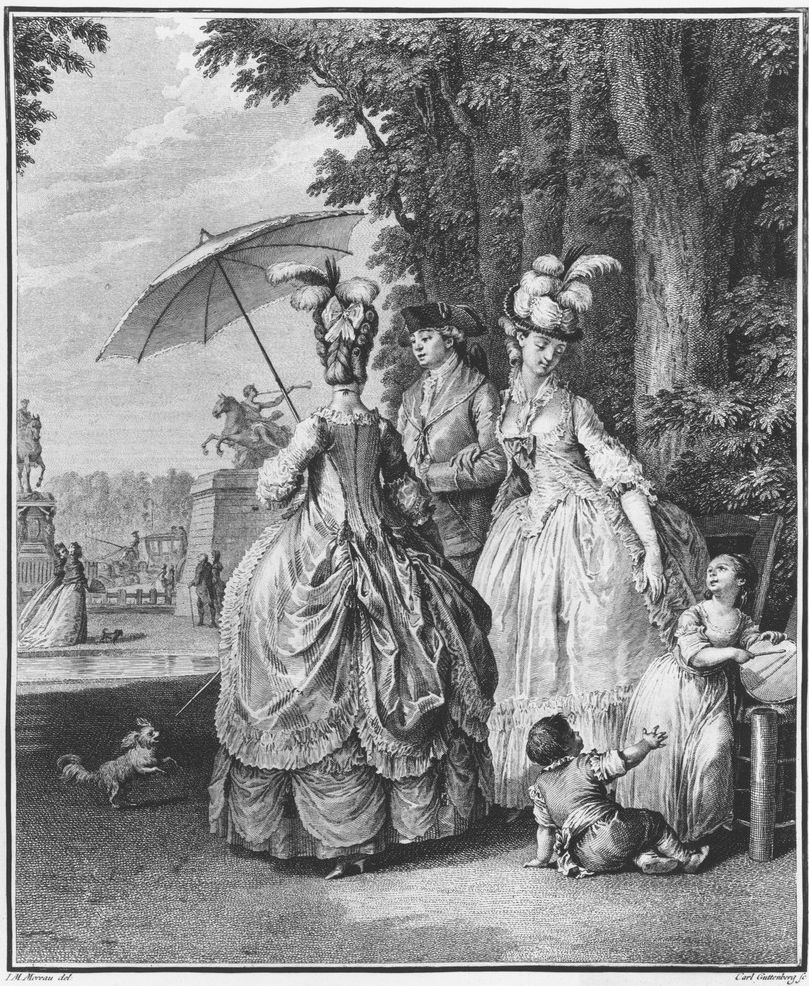
Jean-Michel Moreau, Le Rendez-vous pour Marly, engraved by Carl Guttenberg c. 1777

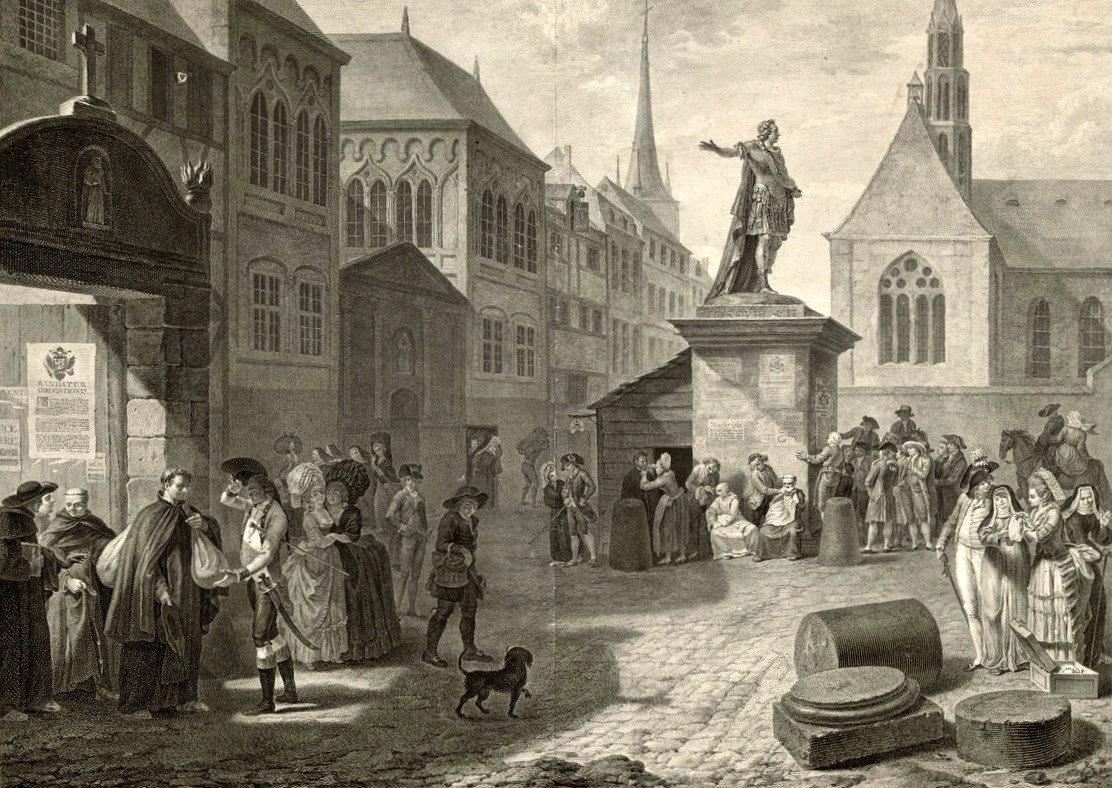
Suppression of convents under Joseph II (1782)

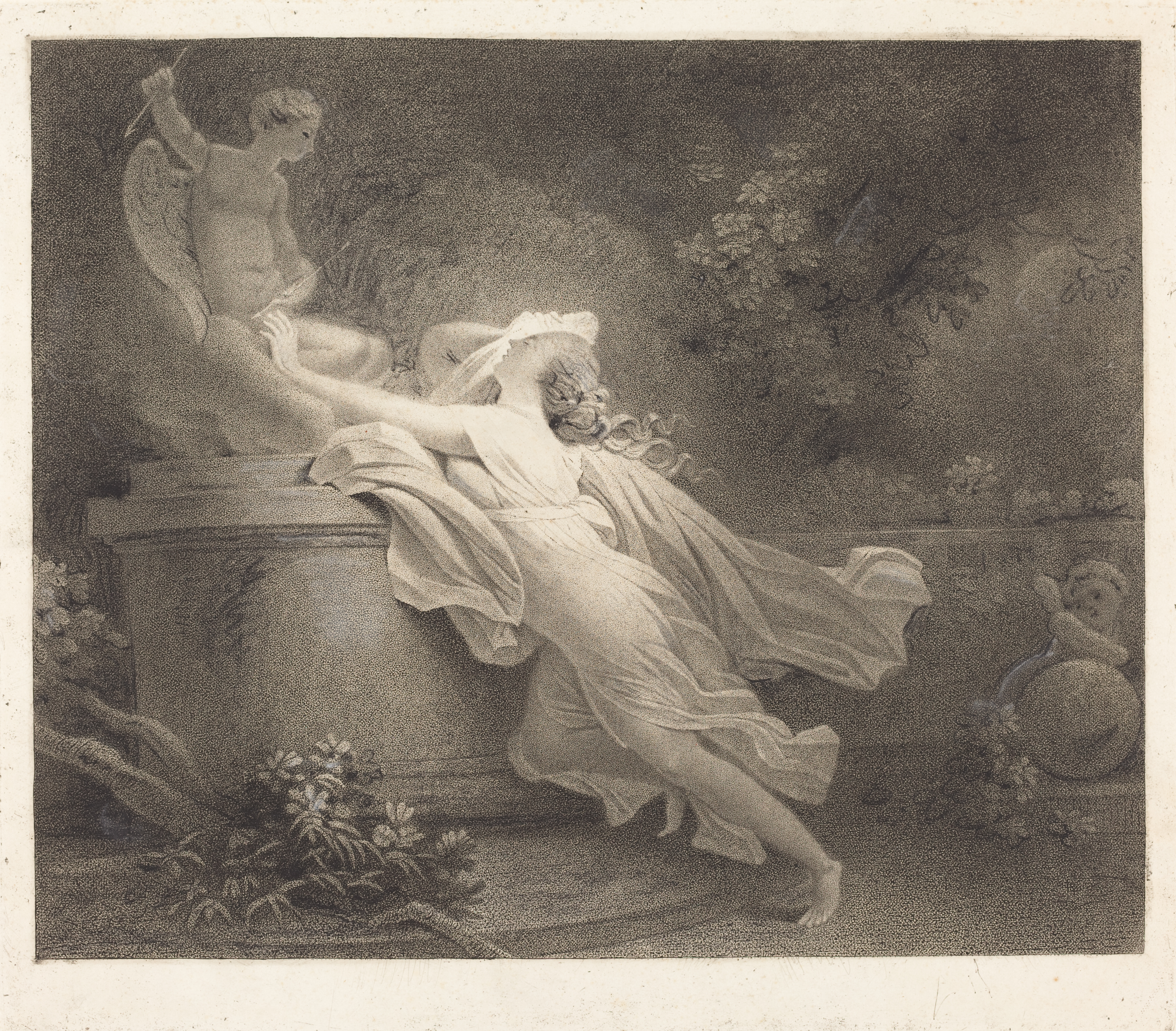
The Invocation to Love

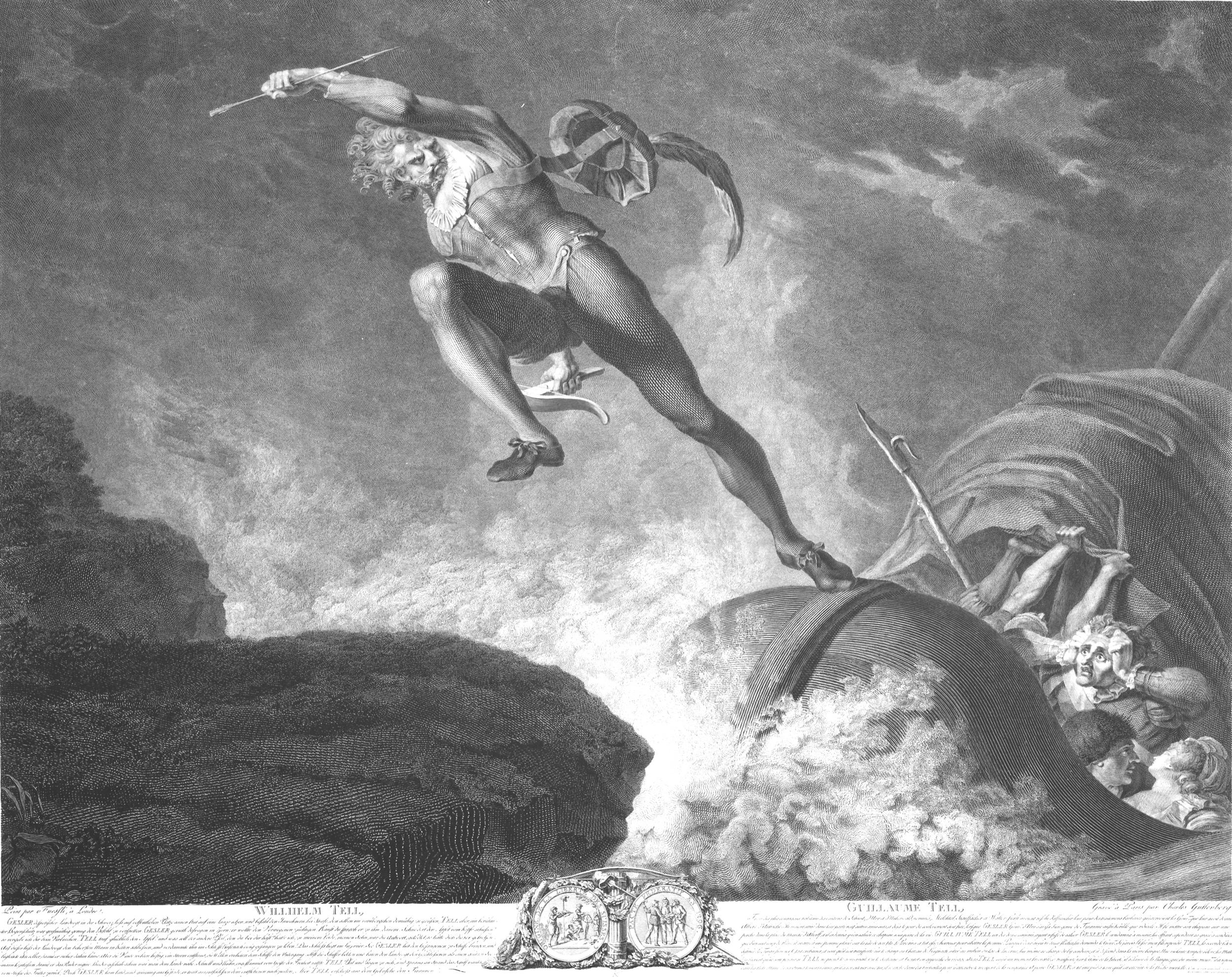
Wilhelm Tell (c. 1780)

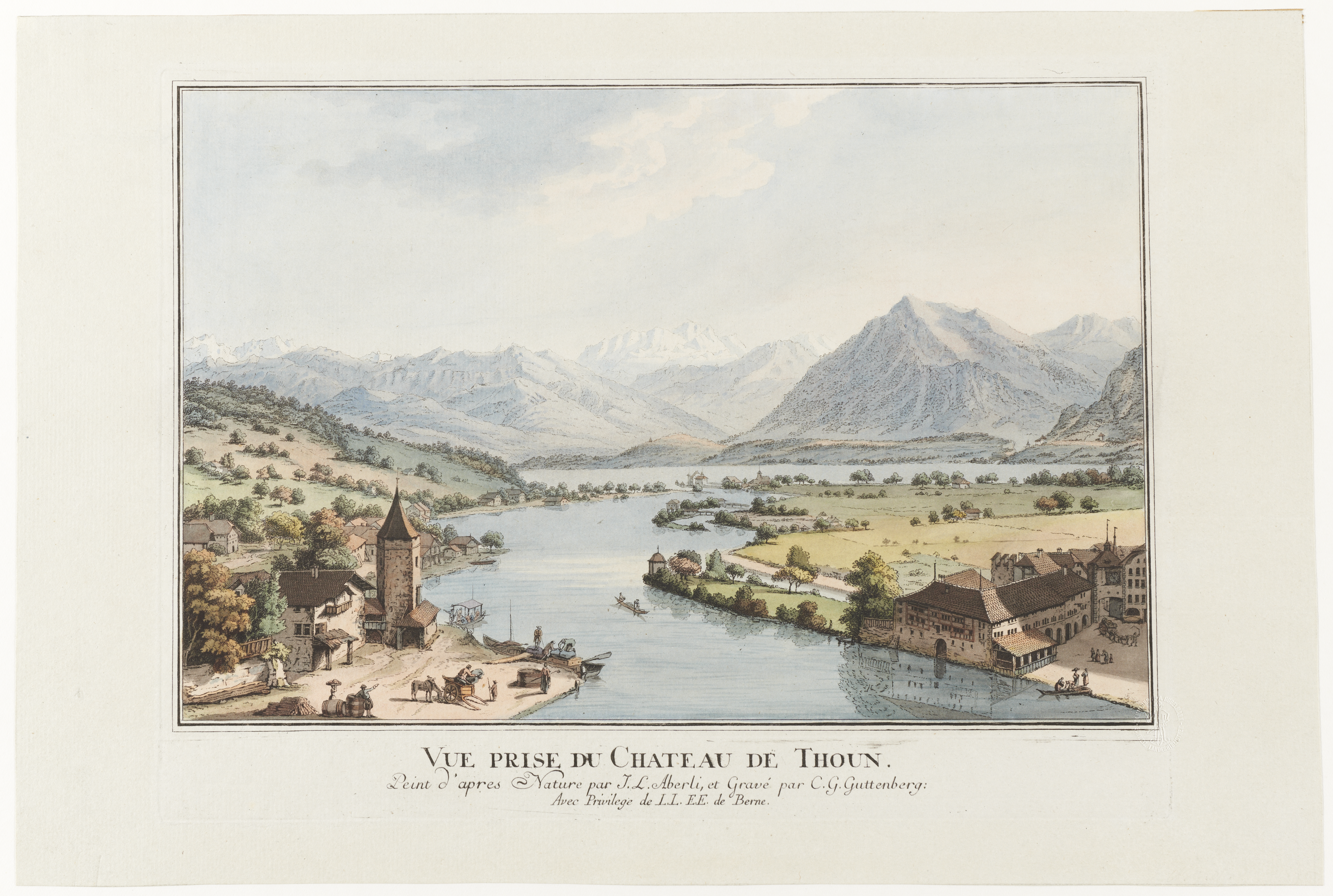
Thun, partial view from the castle towards the lake

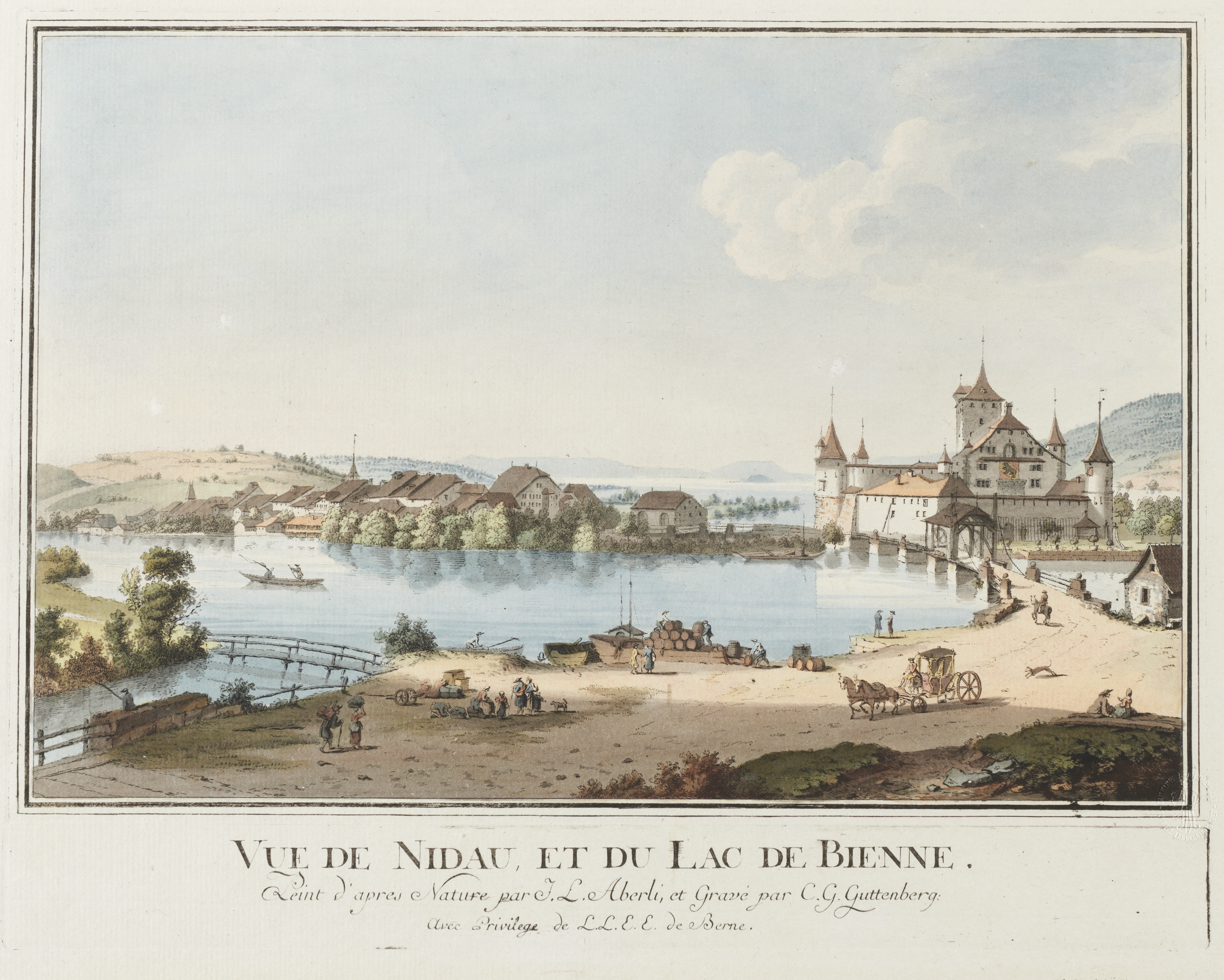
Nidau, town and castle, from the northeast
