= Marie Colombier =

French actress and writer

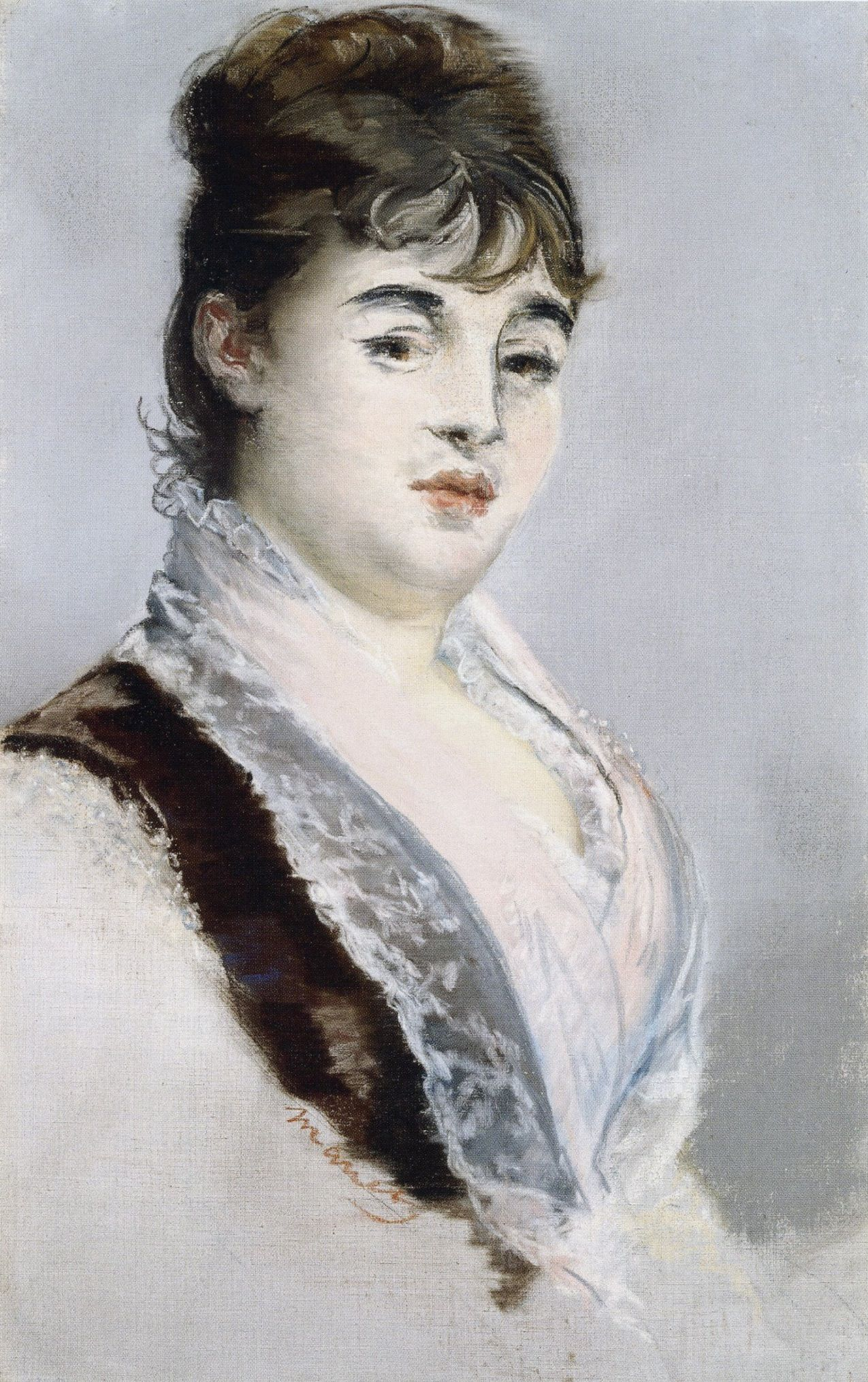
- Marie Colombier portrait by Edouard Manet (1880)
- Born: Anne Marie Thérèse Colombier; 28 November 1844; Auzances, France
- Died: 30 August 1910 (aged 65)
- Resting place: Père Lachaise Cemetery
- Occupations: Actress, Writer
- Years active: 1863–1900

Marie Colombier (Anne Marie Thérèse Colombier; 28 November 1844 – 30 August 1910) was an author, actress, and courtesan in late 19th century France. Colombier is perhaps best known for her contentious relationship with the actress Sarah Bernhardt, with whom she toured across America and Canada.

== Early life and career ==
Marie recounts the story of her birth in her autobiography. Her unmarried mother wished to escape Auzances, France by obtaining the recognition of her father's rich and powerful family in Andalusia, Spain. This effort failed and the couple were separated; her mother was forced to walk back to Auzances, where she then gave birth to Marie. Colombier was raised by her grandmother in Auzances. At age seven, she and her mother settled together in Paris. At the age of 15, she ran away with the famous pianist Charles de Bériot, to Brussels, where his father lived. He helped her with her acting career; while in Belgium, she enrolled in lessons at the Théâtre de la Monnaie.

She returned to Paris in 1862, and passed through the Conservatoire national supérieur d'art dramatique, where in 1863, she was awarded with prestigious prize in tragedy and comedy. Marie debuted at the Théâtre du Châtelet, and she continued to master her craft, performing in shows at the Théâtre de la Gaîté (rue Papin), and Théâtre de la Porte Saint-Martin. Famous playwright and novelist George Sand cast Colombier in L'Autre alongside Sarah Bernhardt at the Odéon-Théâtre de l'Europe in 1870.

== Relationship with Sarah Bernhardt ==
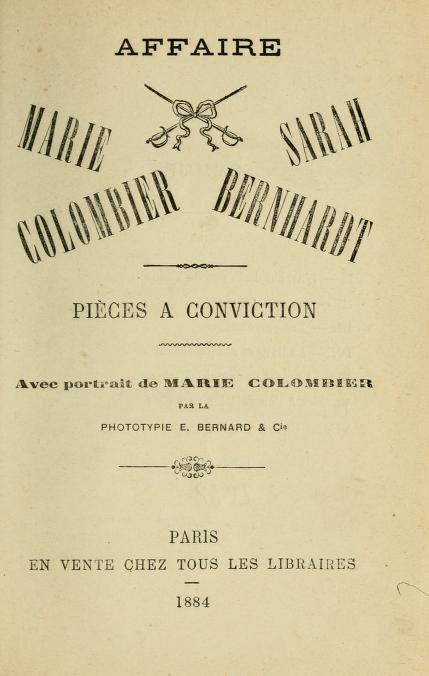
Title page of Colombier's account of the conflict with Bernhardt (1884)

In 1880, Bernhardt took Colombier with her on her eight-month tour of the United States and Canada, which formed the basis of Colombier's Voyage de Sarah Bernhardt en Amérique, one of two works that describe the scandalous details of Bernhardt's behavior on tour. Its publication in 1881, followed by Les Memoires de Sarah Barnum, caused outrage among Bernhardt's supporters, which heightened its popularity, with thousands of copies selling out within days of its publication in Paris.

The anger felt by Bernhardt in wake of Colombier's defamation led her to send her son and the poet Jean Richepin to ransack Colombier's apartment on Rue de Thann. It is reported that Colombier was horsewhipped the same morning that Bernhardt tried to take legal proceedings to seize the books before they were printed and distributed across Europe. The exact details of the conflict, despite many public reports, remain unknown. News reports on the event conflict with Colombier's personal recollection that she wrote in Affaire Marie Colombier – Sarah Bernhardt (1884).

== Personal life ==
When theatres reopened after the Franco-Prussian War of 1870, the siege of Paris, and the Paris Commune, Colombier had an affair for several months with the poet François Coppée, starring in his successful comedy, Le Passant (1872).

She then dated Henri Thierry, the son of one of the owners of the large foundries in Mulhouse, who left to exploit gold mines in Peru. Then Arthur Rostand, a young banker, who left her after two years under pressure from his family.

Among Colombier's relationships in the 1880s were the journalist Léon Duchemin and the Duke of Fernán-Núñez. Édouard Manet made a portrait of Colombier in pastel in 1882. Colombier gradually gave up the theatre, publishing several novels and several volumes of her memoirs.

She died in 1910 and is buried in Père Lachaise Cemetery.

== Theatrical roles ==
- La Jeunesse du roi Henri (1864) by Ponson du Terraill at Théâtre du Châtelet (Role: Paola)
- Les Mohicans de Paris (1864) by Alexandre Dumas fils at Théâtre de la Gaîté (Role: Suzanne)
- Les Enfants de la louve (1865) by Théodore Barrière at Théâtre de la Gaîté (Role: Jane Shore)
- Le Paradis perdu (1865) by Adolphe d'Ennery at Théâtre de la Gaîté (Role: Eve)
- Les Trois Hommes forts (1865) by Hippolyte Hostein at Théâtre du Châtelet
- Jean La Poste (1866) after Dion Boucicault at Théâtre de la Gaîté
- La Reine Cotillon (1866) by Auguste Anicet-Bourgeois at Théâtre de la Porte Saint-Martin (Role: the Countess of Egmont)
- Rocambole (1867) by Auguste Anicet-Bourgeois at Théâtre de la Porte Saint-Martin
- L'Autre (1870) by George Sand at Odéon-Théâtre de l'Europe (Role: Hilda Sinclair)
- Flava (1870) by Jean du Vistre at Odéon-Théâtre de l'Europe
- Le Bois (1871) by Albert Glatigny at Odéon-Théâtre de l'Europe
- Mademoiselle Aïssé (1872) by Louis Bouilhet at Odéon-Théâtre de l'Europe
- Le Rendez-vous (1872) by François Coppée at Odéon-Théâtre de l'Europe
- Le Passant (1872) by François Coppée at Odéon-Théâtre de l'Europe
- Le Mariage de Figaro (1872) by Beaumarchais at Odéon-Théâtre de l'Europe
- Mademoiselle Trente-six vertus (1873) by Arsène Houssaye at Théâtre de l'Ambigu (Role: Lucie)
- Jeanne d'Arc (1875) by Jules Barbier at Grand Théâtre de Bordeaux (Role: Joan of Arc)
- Une cause célèbre (1878), Théâtre de l'Ambigu, and later transported to Théâtre de la Porte Saint-Martin
- American Tour with Sarah Bernhardt from October 1880 – May 1881 (New York, Boston, Montreal, Philadelphia, Chicago etc.)
  - Phèdre
  - la Dame aux camélias
  - Froufrou
  - l'Étrangère
  - le Sphinx
  - le Princesse Georges (created in Boston)
- Léa (1881) by Jean Malus at Théâtre de la Comédie Parisienne (Role: Léa)
- Bianca (1884) by Marie Colombier at Théâtre Montansier

== Writings ==
Many of her written works describe the lives of actresses and courtesans in late 19th-century France.

=== Nonfiction ===
- Les Mémoires de Sarah Barnum (1879), with introduction from Paul Bonnetain, (1879–1884) illustrated by Adolphe Willette (1883–1884
- Le Voyage de Sarah Bernhardt en Amérique, with introduction from Arsène Houssaye (1881)
- Affaire Marie Colombier – Sarah Bernhardt, les pièces à convictions. (1884)
- Mémoires fin d'empire. Préface par Armand Silvestre (1898)
- Mémoires fin de siècle (1899)
- Mémoires fin de tout (1900)

=== Fiction ===
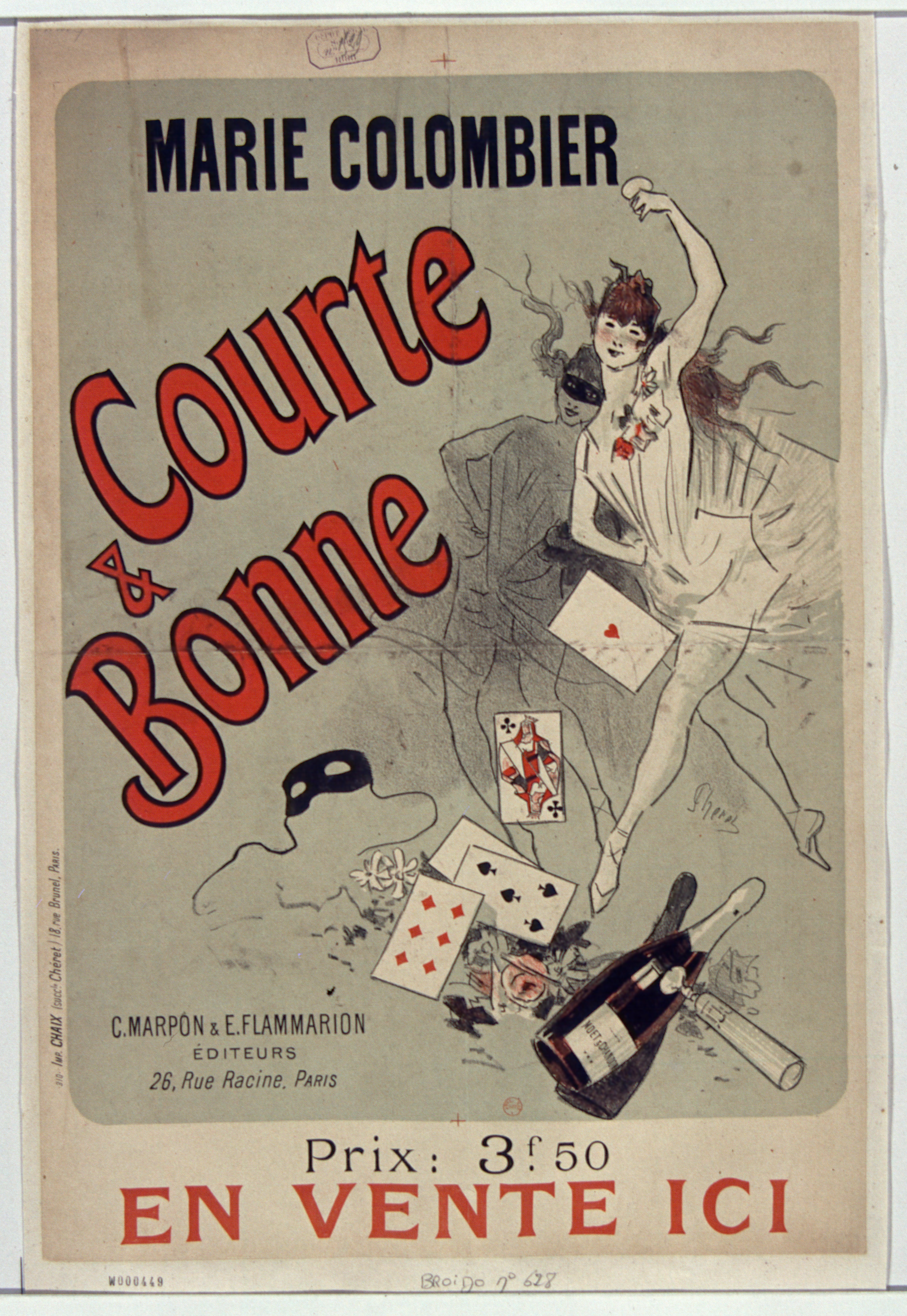
Cover of Courte & Bonne by Marie Colombier, 1888

- Le carnet d'une Parisienne (1882)
- Le Pistolet de la Petite Baronne, with introduction Armand Silvestre (1883)
- Bianca (1884)
- Méres et Filles (1885)
- On en Meurt, (1886)
- La Plus Jolie Femme de Paris (1887)
- Courte & Bonne (1888)
- Nathalie, on en Muert (1898)
- Le Prince Brutus (1898)
- Sacha (1898)
- Les Trois Princesses (1900)
