= Molehill =

Mound of soil raised by burrowing mammals

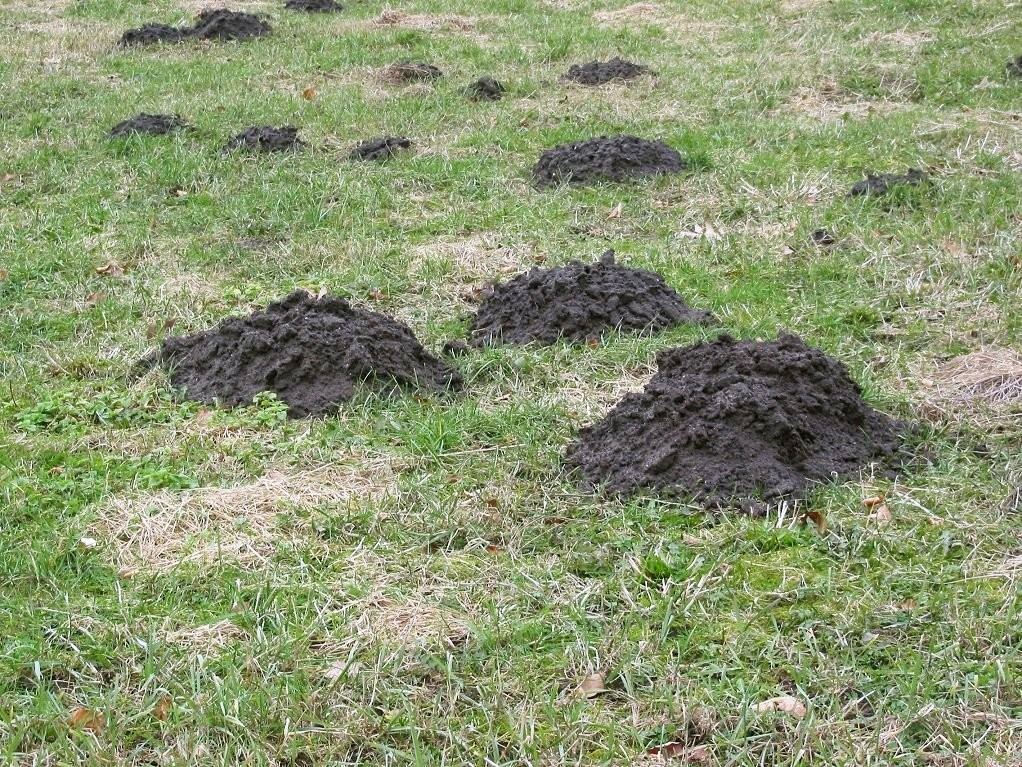
Several lines of molehills in the pasture.

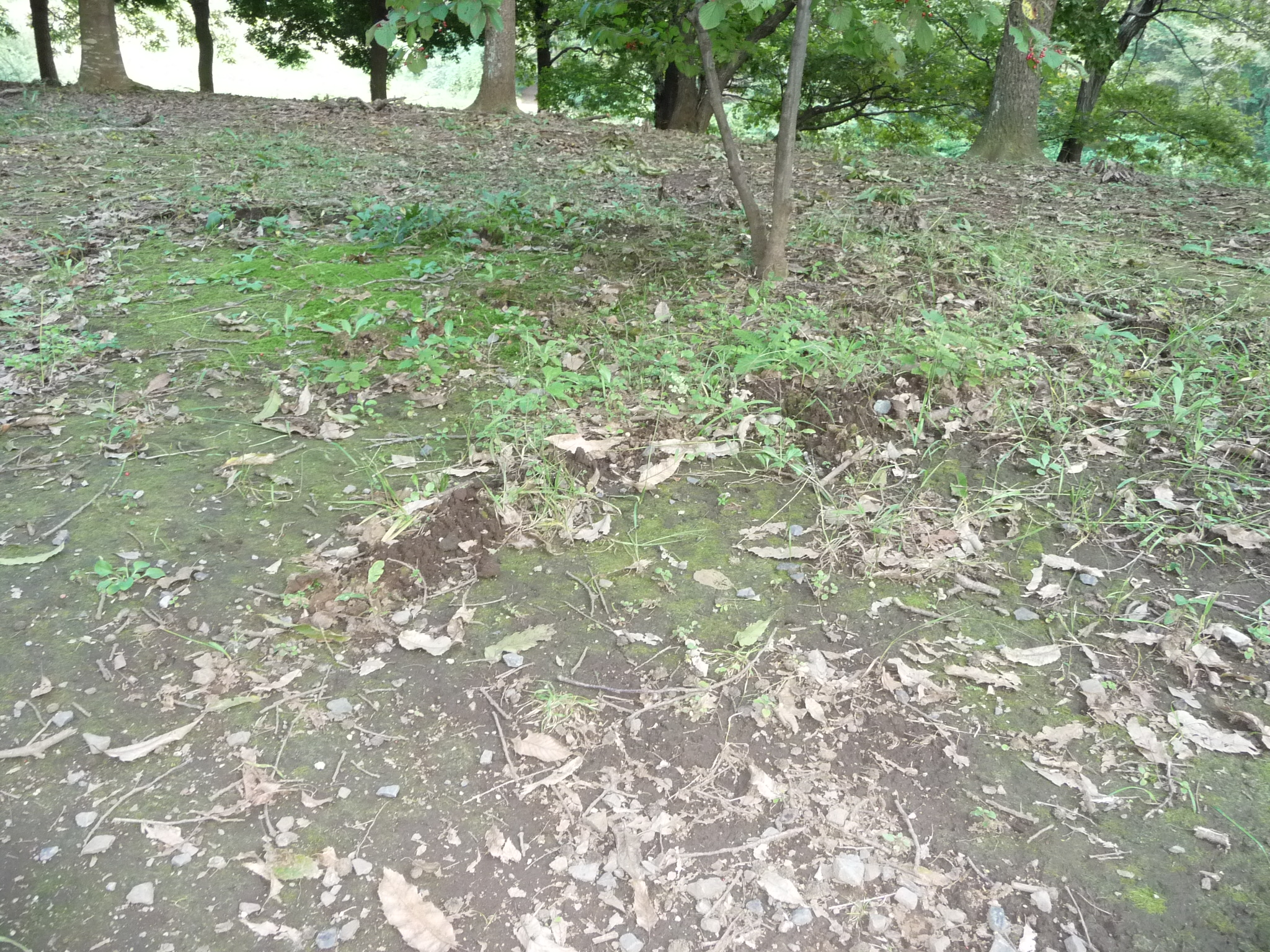
Trail of mole pass of molehills at Kasori Shell Mound, Chiba city

A molehill (or mole-hill, mole mound) is a conical mound of loose soil raised by small burrowing mammals, including moles, but also similar animals such as mole-rats, and voles. The word is first recorded in the first half of the 15th century. Formerly, the hill was known as a 'wantitump', a word still in dialect use for centuries afterwards.

The phrase "making a mountain out of a molehill" is commonly used metaphorically to mean "to exaggerate a minor problem".

== Evidence of burrows ==
Molehills are waste material which come from digging or repairing burrows, and so are usually found where the animal is establishing new burrows, or where existing ones are damaged (for example by the weight of grazing livestock). Where moles burrow beneath the roots of trees or shrubs, the roots support the tunnel, and molehills are less common, and so even a dense population of the animals may be inconspicuous in these places.

Molehills are often the only sign to indicate the presence of the animal and recording their presence may be the most reliable way to determine the number of moles in an area. Commonly they occur in lines along the route of the burrow, but in some cases they may not be directly above the burrow itself but at the ends of short side-tunnels. The mole runs vary in depth from surface runs only a few inches deep, to main runs, some 12 to 18 inches deep.

The disturbance of the soil brings an important benefit by aerating and tilling it, adding to its fertility. Molehills are therefore sometimes used as a source of good soil for use in gardening and are particularly valued by some practitioners of permaculture for fine potting soil. However, they may cause damage to gardens and functional areas of grass such as pasture land, and they represent a minor safety hazard. King William III of England is recorded as dying from complications after he was thrown when his horse stumbled on one.

In locations where mole-hills are not desired, the moles may be killed, or deterrent plants like caper spurge or the related castor bean plant can be planted. The fresh molehills can also be removed carefully as soon as they appear. This leaves the animals and their galleries undamaged and thus reduces the need for the moles to make further molehills when they clear earth out of the tunnels.

== Gallery: a mole emerging ==
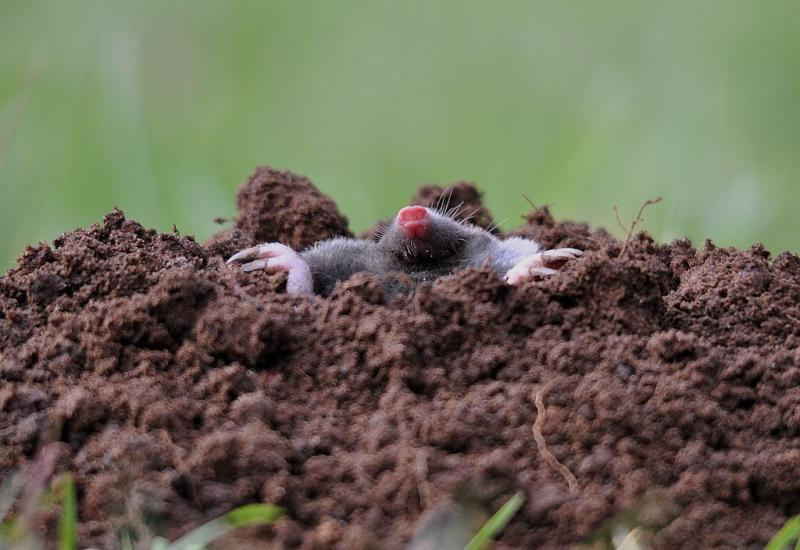

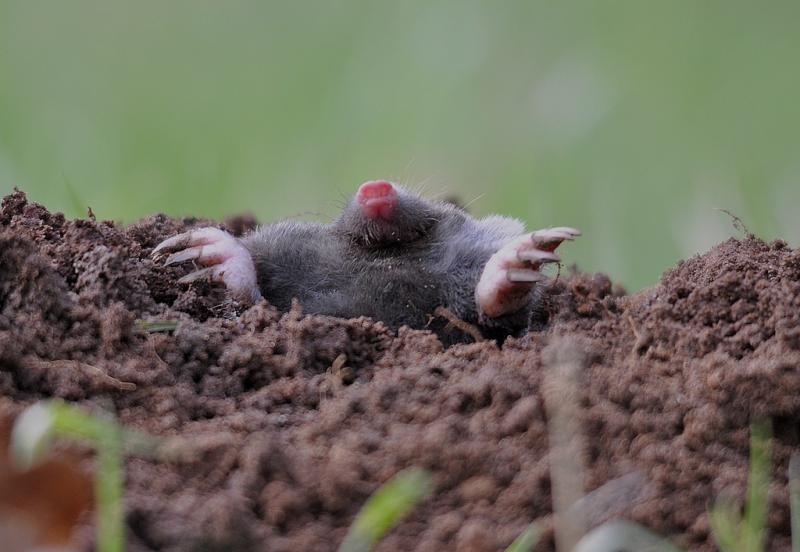

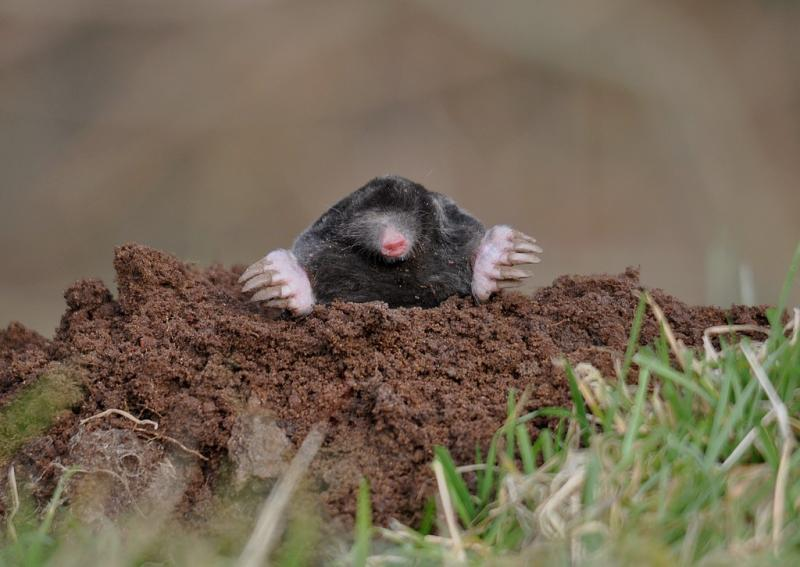

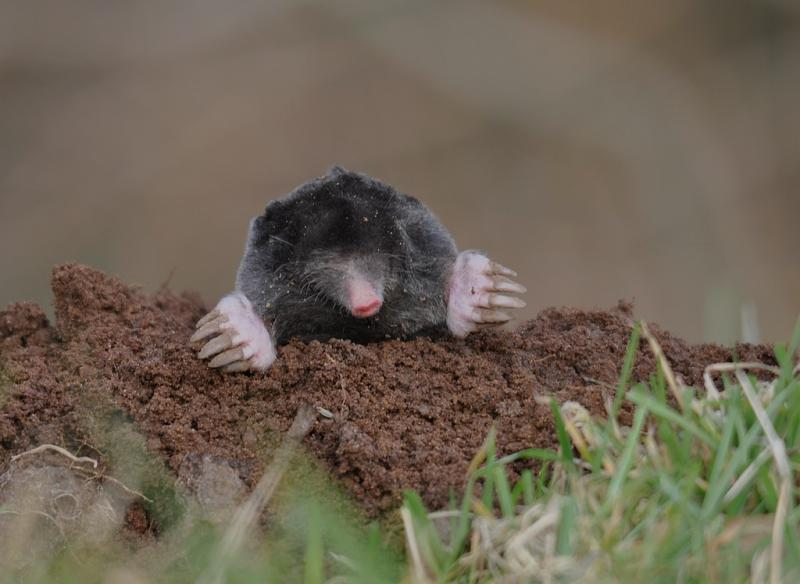
