= Arthur de Beauplan =

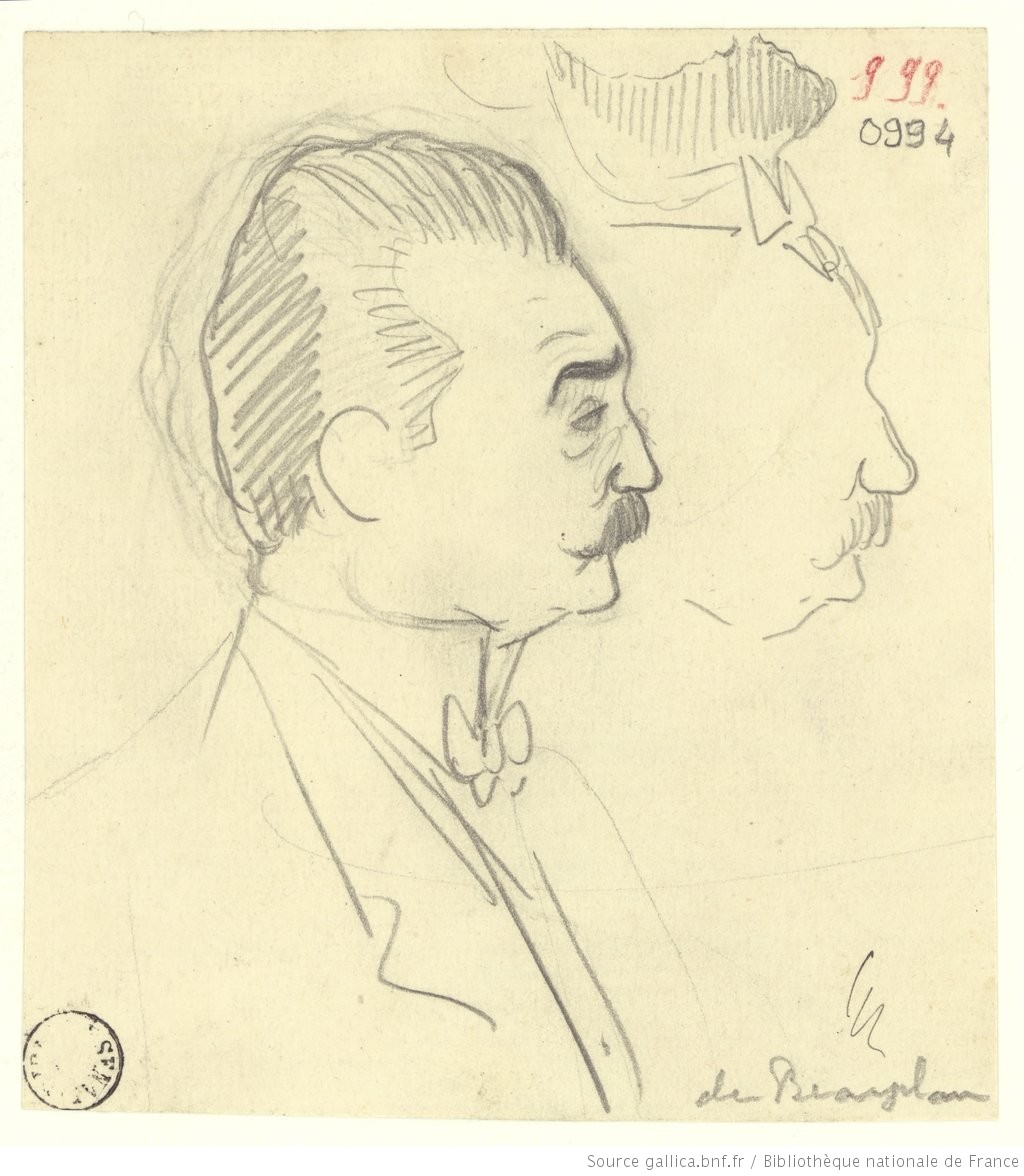
- Born: Victor Arthur Rousseau de Beauplan; 20 June 1823; Paris
- Died: 11 May 1890 (aged 66); 16th arrondissement of Paris
- Occupations: Playwright, librettist

Arthur de Beauplan (20 June 1823 – 11 May 1890), The son of the writer and composer Amédée de Beauplan, he wrote numerous vaudevilles and libretti for opéras comiques for Adolphe Adam (La poupée de Nuremberg, 1852), Ferdinand Poise (Bonsoir, voisin, 1853) or Théodore Dubois (Le Pain bis ou La Lilloise, 1879), in collaboration in particular with Adolphe de Leuven and Léon Lévy Brunswick.

He was made a knight in the Order of the Legion of Honour in 1858. In 1868, he was appointed Imperial Commissioner of the Théâtre de l'Odeon then of the opera houses and of the Conservatoire de Paris Head office of the theaters, he became Deputy Director in the Académie des Beaux-Arts in 1871.

== Works ==
Theatre

- Les Suites d'un feu d'artifice, vaudeville in 1 act with Clairville and Léon Battu, 14 November 1848, Théâtre du Vaudeville
- Les Grenouilles qui demandent un roi, vaudeville in 1 act with Clairville and J. Cordier, 26 February 1849, Gymnase-Dramatique
- La Montagne qui accouche, vaudeville in 1 act with Charles Varin, 30 May 1849, Gymnase-Dramatique
- Rosette et nœud coulant, vaudeville en 1 act with Mélesville, 19 January 1850, Théâtre Montansier
- Un coup d’État, vaudeville in 1 act with Adolphe de Leuven and Léon Lévy Brunswick, 25 February 1850, Théâtre du Gymnase
- L'Amour mouillé, comédie-vaudeville in 1 act with Michel Carré and Jules Barbier, 5 May 1850, Théâtre du Gymnase
- Suffrage Ier ou le Royaume des aveugles, journal-vaudeville with Adolphe de Leuven and Léon Lévy Brunswick, 9 May 1850, Théâtre du Vaudeville
- Les Pavés sur le pavé, revue-vaudeville in 1 act with Adolphe de Leuven and Léon-Lévy Brunswick, 2 September 1850, Théâtre du Vaudeville
- Les Baignoires du Gymnase, vaudeville in 1 act with Adolphe de Leuven, 31 October 1850, Théâtre du Gymnase
- Le Règne des escargots, revue-vaudeville in 3 acts with Adolphe de Leuven and Léon Lévy Brunswick, 23 November 1850, Théâtre du Vaudeville
- Hortense de Cerny, comedy in 2 acts mingled with song with Jean-François Bayard, 24 November 1851, Théâtre du Vaudeville
- Claudine ou les Avantages de l'inconduite, étude pastorale et berrichonne with Paul Siraudin, 22 February 1851, Théâtre du Palais-Royal
- Thérèse, ou Ange et Diable, comédie-vaudeville in 2 acts with Jean-François Bayard, 29 October 1852, Théâtre du Gymnase
- Élisa ou Un chapitre de l'Oncle Tom, comedy in acts, 21 February 1853, Théâtre du Gymnase
- Boccace ou le Décaméron, comedy in 5 acts mingled with song with Jean-François Bayard, Adolphe de Leuven and Léon Lévy Brunswick, 23 February 1853, Théâtre du Vaudeville
- Un notaire à marier, comédie-vaudeville in 3 acts with Eugène Labiche and Marc-Michel, 19 March 1853, Théâtre des Variétés
- Un coup de vent, vaudeville in 1 act with Varin and Léon-Lévy Brunswick, 22 May 1853, Théâtre du Palais-Royal
- Le Lys dans la vallée, drama in 5 acts after Balzac with Théodore Barrière, 14 June 1853, Théâtre-Français
- Un feu de cheminée, vaudeville in 1 act with Eugène Labiche, 31 July 1853, Théâtre du Palais-Royal
- To be or not to be, comedy in 2 acts mingled with couplets with Léon-Lévy Brunswick, 19 October 1853, Théâtre du Palais-Royal
- Un mari qui ronfle, vaudeville in 1 act with Paul Siraudin, 2 November 1854, Théâtre des Variétés
- Les Pièges dorés, comedy in 3 acts, 21 January 1856, Théâtre-Français
- Les Toquades de Boromée, vaudeville in 1 act with Léon-Lévy Brunswick, 20 February 1856, Théâtre du Palais-Royal
- Les Marrons glacés, comedy in 1 act mingled with song, 30 December 1856, Théâtre du Palais-Royal
- L'École des ménages, comedy in 5 acts in verses after Balzac, 11 May 1858, Théâtre de l'Odéon
- Les Plantes parasites ou la Vie en famille, comedy in 4 acts, 7 May 1862, Théâtre du Vaudeville

Opéras comiques

- La Poupée de Nuremberg, opéra comique in 1 act with Adolphe de Leuven, music by Adolphe Adam, 21 February 1852, Théâtre-Lyrique
- Guillery le Trompette, opéra comique in 2 acts with Adolphe de Leuven, music by Salvatore Sarmiento, 8 December 1852, Théâtre-Lyrique
- Bonsoir, voisin, opéra comique in 1 act with Léon Lévy Brunswick, music by Ferdinand Poise, 18 September 1853, Théâtre-Lyrique
- Dans les vignes, tableau villageois in 1 act with Louis Lhérie, music by Louis Clapisson, 31 December 1854, Théâtre-Lyrique
- Mam'zelle Geneviève, opéra comique in 2 acts with Léon Lévy Brunswick, music byAdolphe Adam, 24 March 1856, Théâtre-Lyrique
- Le Pain bis ou La Lilloise, opéra comique in 1 act with Léon Lévy Brunswick, music by Théodore Dubois, 26 February 1879, Opéra-Comique

Texts

- 1843: Le Monument de Molière, Breteau et Pichery, Paris
- 1883: Dix Satires, avec prologue et épilogue, Librairie universelle, Paris
- 1885: Les Sept Paroles, Librairie des auteurs modernes, Paris

Source : Catalogue général de la BNF

== Bibliography ==
- Louis Gustave Vapereau, Dictionnaire universel des littératures, Paris, Hachette, 1893, p. 114 (Read on line Gallica)
- Christian Goubault, « Arthur de Beauplan » in Joël-Marie Fauquet (dir.), Dictionnaire de la musique en France au XIXe siècle, Fayard, Paris, 2003 ISBN 2-213-59316-7
