= Amédée de Beauplan =

French playwright, composer and painter

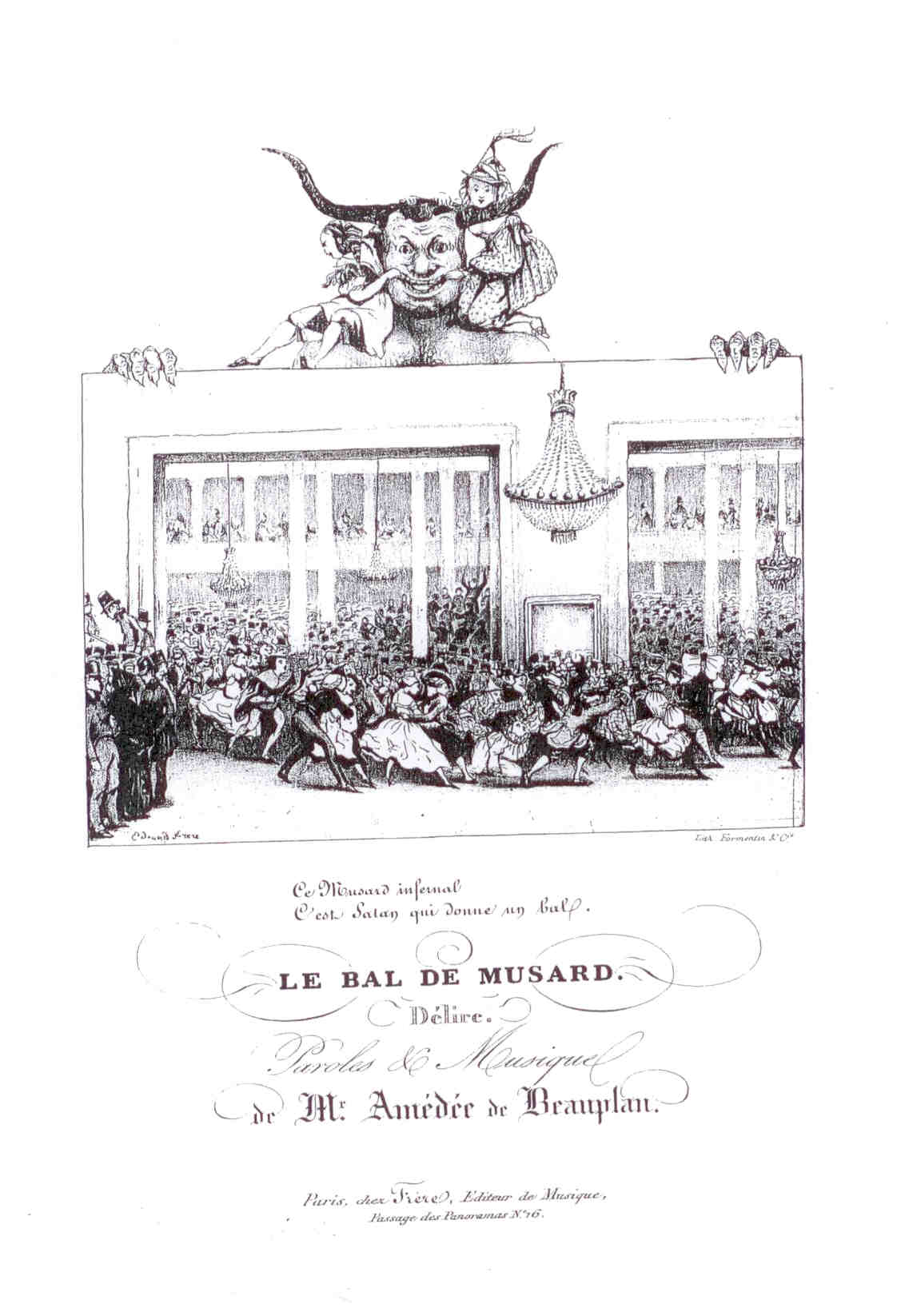
- Le Bal de Musard, musical score
- Born: Amédée Rousseau; 11 July 1790; Beauplan, former hamlet near Saint-Rémy-lès-Chevreuse (Seine-et-Oise)
- Died: 24 December 1853 (aged 63); Paris
- Occupations: Playwright, composer and painter

Amédée de Beauplan (11 July 1790 – 24 December 1853) was a 19th-century French playwright, composer and painter. Amédée de Beauplan was in fact used as a nom-de-plume by Amédée Rousseau.

Much of his family (including his father), close to queen Marie Antoinette's entourage, was executed during the French Revolution.

He composed hit songs, including Le Pardon and Dormez, mes chères amours, and the famous Leçon de valse du petit François (1834) sung in cabarets for over a century (in particular by George Chepfer), and two opéras comiques: L'Amazone, after Scribe, Delestre-Poirson and Mélesville (1830) and Le Mari au bal (1845). Dormez, mes chères amours was also utilized as the text for the aria of Monsieur Guillot in Tchaikovsky's opera Eugene Onegin. He also authored several vaudevilles, novels, fables and painted some pictures between 1833 and 1842.

He was Arthur de Beauplan's father (1823–1890), also a playwright.

== Bibliography ==
- Joël-Marie Fauquet, "Beauplan, Amédée de", in Dictionnaire de la musique en France au XIXe siècle (Paris: Fayard, 2003), ISBN 2-213-59316-7.
