= Justin Cabassol =

French songwriter and poet

Justin Cabassol (1800 – 19 January 1873) was a French songwriter and poet.
