= Joël-Marie Fauquet =

French musicologist

- Born: 27 April 1942 (age 84); Nogent-le-Rotrou, France

Academic work
- Discipline: musicology
- Institutions: Centre national de la recherche scientifique
- Main interests: 19th-century music
- Notable works: Dictionnaire de la musique en France au XIXe

Joël-Marie Fauquet (born 27 April 1942 at Nogent-le-Rotrou) is a French musicologist.

== Life ==
Fauquet studied applied arts before devoting himself to musicology and the social history of music. Director of research at the Centre national de la recherche scientifique, his work focuses on 19th-century music. He was Vice-President of the French Society of Musicology from 1991 to 1996.

Among his works as a musicologist, are the catalogue raisonné of the work of Charles Tournemire in 1979, and the reconstitution of the version of Gluck's Orfeo ed Euridice, revised by Berlioz, in 2005.

== Bibliography ==
=== Catalogues ===
- Fauquet, Joël-Marie (1979). Catalogue de l'œuvre de Charles Tournemire (in French). Paris: Éditions Modulaires Européennes. p. 1023. ISBN 2-806-60714-0.
- Fauquet, Joël-Marie (1989). Édouard Lalo : Correspondance (in French). Paris: Editions Klincksieck. p. 352. ISBN 978-2-905-05392-3.

=== Main work ===
- Joël-Marie Fauquet (2003). Dictionnaire de la musique en France au XIXe (in French). Paris: Fayard. pp. 1 422. ISBN 978-2-213-59316-6.

=== Monographs ===
- Fauquet, Joël-Marie (1999). César Franck (in French). Paris: Fayard. p. 1023. ISBN 978-2-213-60167-0.
- Fauquet, Joël-Marie; Hennion, Antoine (2000). La grandeur de Bach. Les chemins de la musique (in French). Paris: Fayard. p. 248. ISBN 978-2-213-60667-5.
- Fauquet, Joël-Marie; Massip, Catherine; Reynaud, Cécile (2011). Berlioz; textes et contextes (in French). Paris: Société française de musicologie. p. 326. ISBN 978-2-853-57022-0.
