= Loïsa Puget =

French composer (1810–1889)

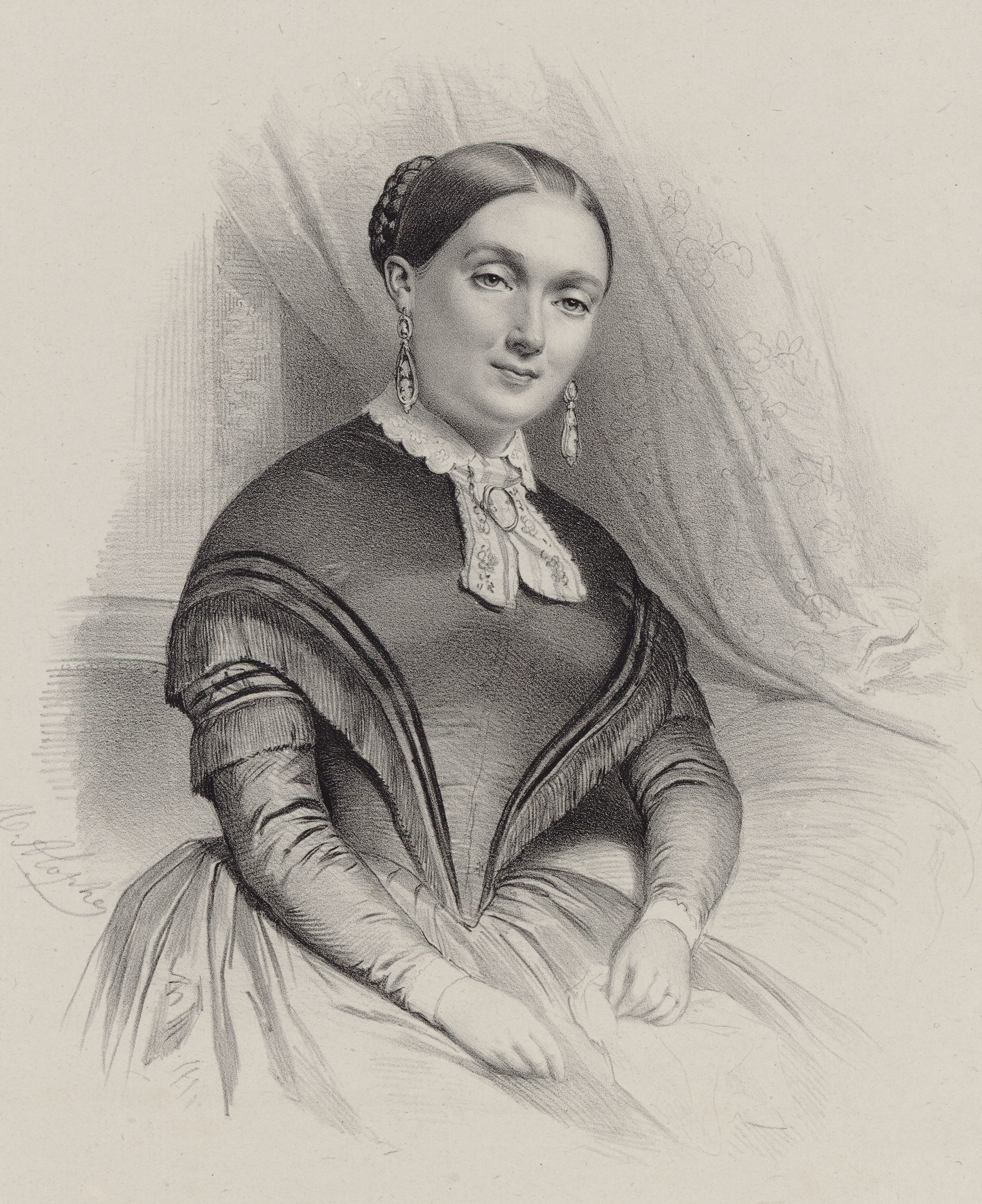
Loïsa Puget

Louise Françoise "Loïsa" Puget (11 February 1810 – 24 October 1889) was a French composer.

== Life ==
Loïsa Puget was born in Paris, her proper first names were Louise Françoise. Her mother was a singer and saw that her daughter received a musical education including study at the same school as George Sand. Her composition teacher was Adolphe Adam. After completing her studies, Puget composed and performed her own music in salons and married her lyricist Gustave Lemoine (1802–1885) in 1845. She was most productive between 1830 and 1845 – apart from some operas she composed the music for over 300 songs. Many of her songs also appeared in editions with guitar accompaniment, some of which were made by prominent guitarists such as Matteo Carcassi. (Note: Examples are Les Honneurs partagés (1838) and L'Aigle (1839).)

In 1841, Lemoine and Adolphe d'Ennery wrote a melodrama based on Puget's most successful song À la grâce de Dieu, which provided the idea for Donizetti's Linda di Chamounix.

Puget died in Pau, aged 79.

== Works ==
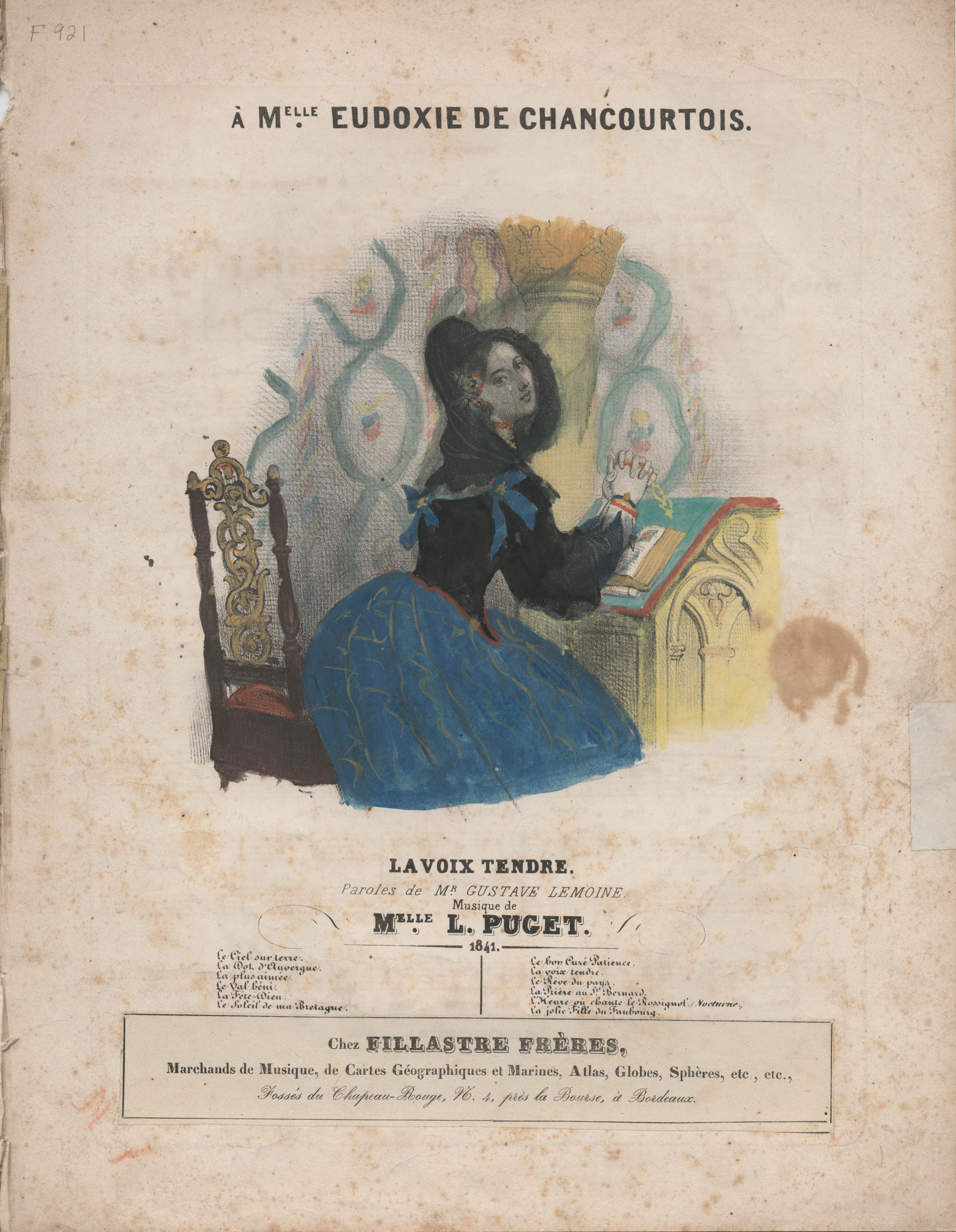
La voix tendre : [romance] / paroles de Gustave Lemoine; musique de Loïsa Puget.

Stage

- Le Mauvais œil, opera (1836)
- La Veilleuse, ou les Nuits de Milady (1869)

Songs (to words by Gustave Lemoine)

- À la grâce de Dieu (ca. 1840)
- Adieu, Cousine
- Appelle-moi ta mère (1844)
- Ave Maria, prière
- Belle pour lui!
- Demain, je serai dame (1838)
- Dis-moi: Je t’aime! (1840?)
- Du temps que la Reine Berthe filait
- Fleur des champs (1840)
- Je veux t'aimer sans te le dire (1838)
- Jeune fille à quinze ans
- L'Aigle (1839)
- La bénédiction d’un père (1860?)
- Le bon curé patience (1843?)
- La chanson du charbonnier, ou blanc et noir (1839)
- Le chasseur et la laitière (1838)
- Le ciel sur terre (1841)
- La coquette de soixante ans (1835?)
- La crèche
- La demande en mariage (1842)
- La dot d’Auvergne (1840?)
- Les deux âmes (1837)
- Les honneurs partagés
- Le lys dans la vallée (1835?)
- Le nom de Marie (1845)
- La reine des fous (1838)
- La sérénade du pâtre (1840?)
- La voix tendre (1841)
- Morte d’amour! (1840)
- Narbonnaise (1840)
- Ne quittez jamais votre mère
- Ta dot
- Tempête (1838)

Piano

- Trois Quadrilles de Contredanses pour le piano sur les motifs de l'Opéra Le Mauvais Oeil.
