= Bruin (surname) =

Bruin, Bruijn, Bruyn and Bruins are Dutch surnames. They can be equivalent to the English surname Brown or, particularly for the form "Bruins", be patronymic as Bruin/Bruijn is a now rare Dutch form of Bruno. The form "the brown" (De Bruin, De Bruine, De Bruijn, De Bruyn and De Bruyne) is more common.

Notable people with the surname include:

Bruin

- James J. Bruin (1898–1949), Massachusetts politician
- Jan Bruin (born 1969), Dutch footballer
- Joseph Bruin (1809–1882), American slave trader
- Will Bruin (born 1989), American soccer player

Bruijn

- Antonie Augustus Bruijn (1842–1890), Dutch navy officer, merchant and naturalist
  - Named after him: Bruijn's brushturkey and Bruijn's Riflebird
- Jaap R. Bruijn (1938–2022), Dutch maritime historian
- Jordy Bruijn (born 1996), Dutch football midfielder

Bruyn

- Andrew DeWitt Bruyn (1790–1838), New York politician
- Barthel Bruyn the Elder (1493–1555), Cologne Renaissance painter
- Barthel Bruyn the Younger (c.1530–c.1608), Cologne Renaissance painter
- Jan Bruyn (born 1948), Dutch rower
- Maurice Bruyn (1386–1466), English knight (name derived from "Brun")
- Michelle de Bruyn (born 1965), New Zealand footballer

Bruins

- Bruno Bruins (born 1963), Dutch politician
- Eppo Bruins (born 1969), Dutch politician
- Hanke Bruins Slot (born 1977), Dutch politician
- Jan Bruins (1940–1997), Dutch motorcycle road racer
- Luigi Bruins (born 1987), Dutch footballer
- Mary Bruins Allison (1903–1994), American doctor and missionary
- Récardo Bruins Choi (born 1985), Dutch-Korean racecar driver
- Regina Bruins (born 1986), Dutch racing cyclist
- Rika Bruins (1934–2025), Dutch swimmer
- Siert Bruins (1921–2015), Dutch collaborator with Nazi Germany
- Theo Bruins (1929–1993), Dutch pianist and composer
- Tonny Bruins Slot (1947–2020), Dutch football coach

Bruyns

- Mark Bruyns (born 1973), South African cricketer

== See also ==
- Joe Bruin, mascot of the University of California, Los Angeles sports teams
