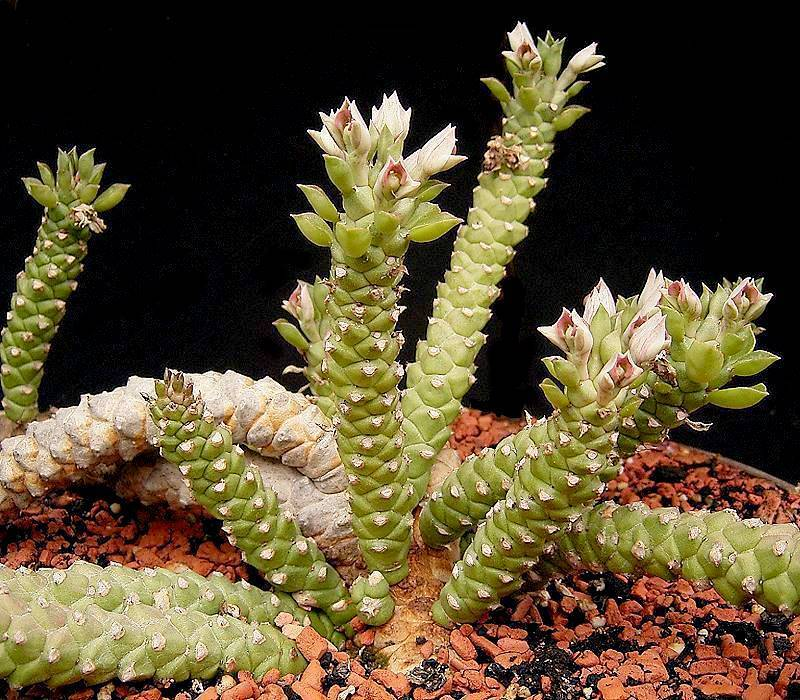

Scientific classification
- Kingdom: Plantae
- Clade: Tracheophytes
- Clade: Angiosperms
- Clade: Eudicots
- Clade: Rosids
- Order: Malpighiales
- Family: Euphorbiaceae
- Genus: Euphorbia
- Species: E. guentheri

Binomial name
- Euphorbia guentheri (Pax) Bruyns

Synonyms
- Monadenium guentheri Pax

= Euphorbia guentheri =

Species of flowering plant

Euphorbia guentheri, also called sausage spurge, is a species of flowering plant in the family Euphorbiaceae native to eastern Africa. Euphorbia guentheri is more low-growing, sprawling, and spiny, whereas Euphorbia ritchiei and Euphorbia succulenta are more upright, less spiny, and sometimes more colorful in its bracts.

== Description ==
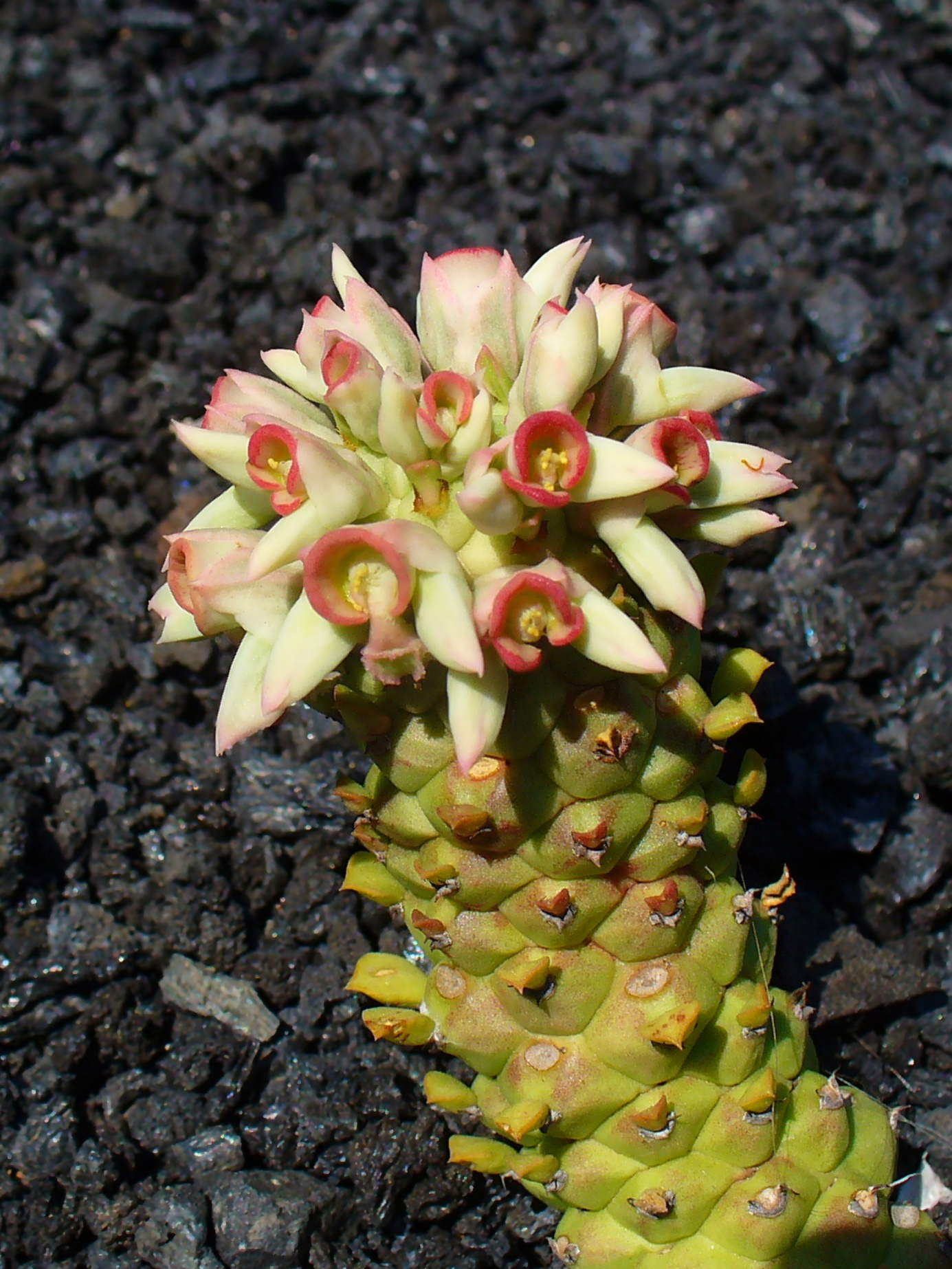
Inflorescence

It is a succulent subshrub characterized by long, numerous, unbranched, fleshy, cylindrical stems adorned with prominent, spine-tipped tubercles. New stems emerge from the base as the plant grows. The stems may be erect, creeping, pendent, or unbranched, reaching up to 3 feet (90 cm) in length and about 0.4 inches (1 cm) in diameter. Stems are tessellated with prominent, somewhat recurved, cone-shaped tubercles measuring up to 7 × 7 mm, from which the leaves emerge. Each tubercle bears 1–3 small, stout, glabrous prickles clustered at the apex near the base of the leaf or leaf scar, up to 2 mm long; the central spine is deflexed, with smaller lateral spines.

Leaves are obovate, green, and grow from the tubercles, measuring up to 3.2 inches (8 cm) long and 0.7 inches (1.8 cm) wide. The leaves are broad to linear-lanceolate, acute, entire, fleshy, with slightly crisped margins, deciduous, and glabrous. It features a thick, rootstock that can be productively raised.

=== Inflorescences ===
The plant produces small flowers in spring, approximately 5 mm long and 4 mm across, featuring red glands surrounded by greenish-white bracts with subtle pink to purple tinges. The flowers arise in the axils of the tubercles; peduncles 4–6 mm long, each bearing 1–2 cyathia. Bract-cup oblique, 6 mm long, 5 mm wide, shortly and sharply 2-lobed at the apex, open in the front with margins not meeting, 2-keeled along the back, glabrous, greenish-white with pink or purple hues, with acute lobes. The cyathia are barrel-shaped, 2 mm in diameter.

The fruit is a capsule, acutely 3-lobed, about 5 × 5 mm, with 3–3.8 mm long, 1.5 mm wide oblong seeds and two tight, fleshy, serrated wings along each angle; pedicel 5 mm.

== Distribution ==
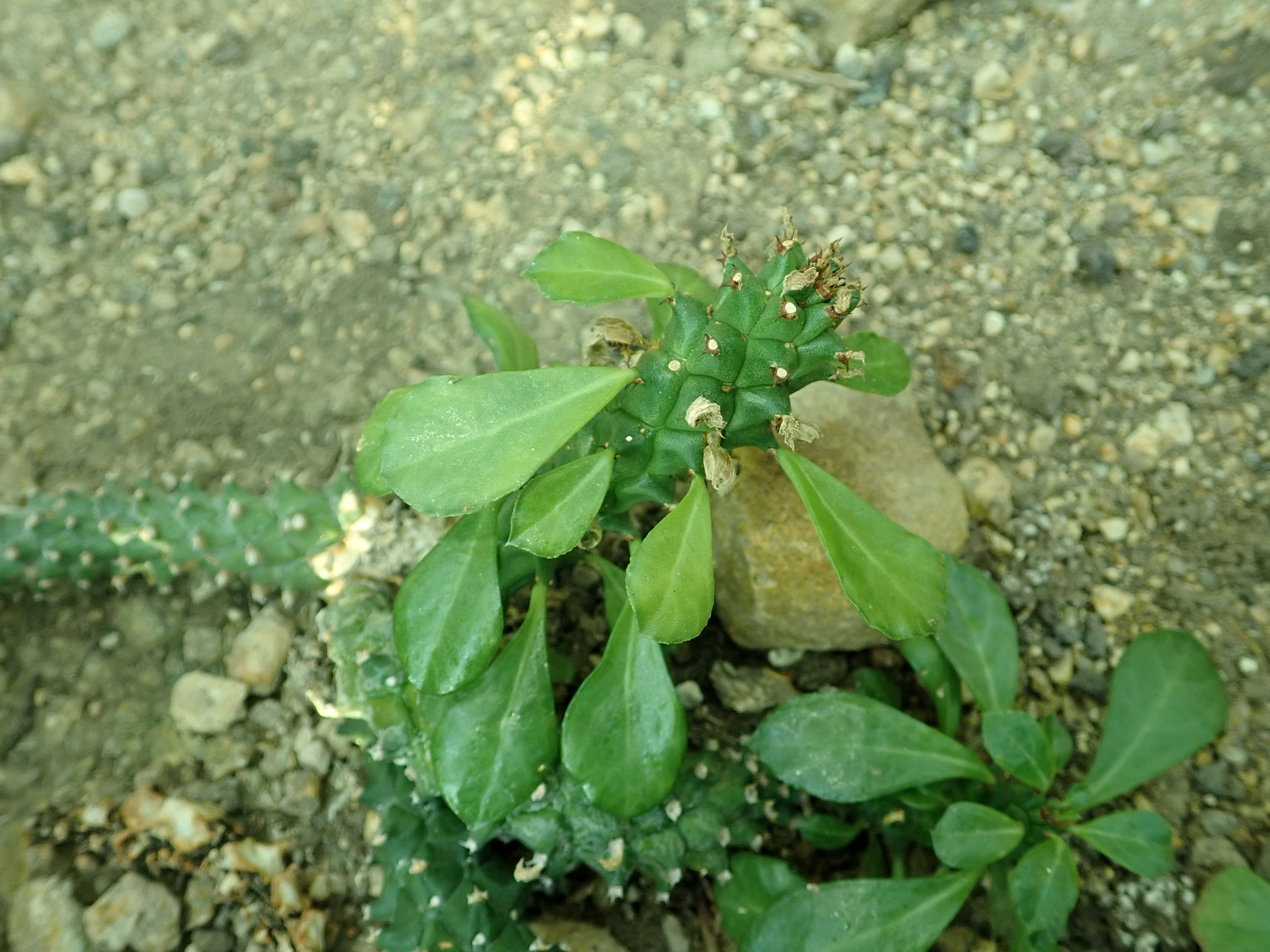
In a Berlin botanical garden

It is native to southeast Kenya in the Teita District, where it is found growing in grass in open scrubland at elevations ranging from 2,950 to 3,280 feet (900 to 1,000 m). A moderately fast grower, it reaches maturity in about 3-5 years. It is also found in desert or dry shrubland biome.
