= De Bruyn =

De Bruyn is a Dutch and Afrikaans surname. "Bruyn" or "bruijn" is an archaic spelling of "bruin", meaning "brown". People with the name include:

- Aad de Bruyn (1910–1991), Dutch 35-fold national champion in discus, shot put and hammer throw
- Abraham de Bruyn (c.1539–1587), Flemish engraver
- Anna Maria de Bruyn (1708–1744), Dutch stage actress and ballet dancer
- Brian de Bruyn (b. 1954), Canadian-born Dutch ice hockey player
- Erik de Bruyn (b. 1962), Dutch film director and actor
- Ettiene de Bruyn (b. 1977), South African cricketer
- Frans De Bruyn (1924–2014), Flemish writer
- Günter de Bruyn (1926–2020), German author
- Joe de Bruyn (b. 1949), Australian trade union official
- John de Bruyn (b. 1956), Dutch-Canadian ice hockey goaltender
- Kevin De Bruyne (b. 1991), Belgian footballer.
- Léon De Bruyn (1838–1908), Belgian politician
- Michelle De Bruyn (b. 1965), New Zealand professional football player
- Nicolaes de Bruyn (1571–1656), Flemish engraver
- Paul de Bruyn (1907–1997), German-American marathon runner
- Pierre de Bruyn (b. 1977), South African cricketer
- Piet De Bruyn (b. 1968), Belgian politician
- Robert de Bruyn (b. 1991), South African rugby player
- Sophia De Bruyn (b. 1938), South African anti-apartheid activist and provincial legislator
- Theunis de Bruyn (b. 1992), South African cricketer
- Tewis de Bruyn (b. 1982), South African rugby player
- Willem de Bruyn (1649–1719), Flemish architect
- Zander de Bruyn (b. 1975), South African cricketer
- Ray de Bruyn (b. 1963), cousin of above South African cricketer

== Compound surnames ==
- Cornelis Adriaan Lobry van Troostenburg de Bruyn (1857–1904), Dutch chemist
- Gerrit Willem van Oosten de Bruyn (1727–1797), Dutch lawyer
- Jacob Leonard de Bruyn Kops (1822–1887), Dutch economist and politician

== See also ==
- 273230 de Bruyn, an asteroid
- De Bruijn
- De Bruin
- De Bruyne
