= De Bruijn =

De Bruijn is a Dutch surname meaning "the brown". Notable people with the surname include:

- Cornelis de Bruijn (1652–1726/7), Dutch artist and traveler
- Jean Victor de Bruijn (1913–1979), Dutch district officer and ethnologist in the Dutch East Indies
- Maarten de Bruijn (b. 1965), Dutch engineer
- Pi de Bruijn (b. 1942), Dutch architect
- Sophia Adriana de Bruijn (1816–1890), Dutch museum founder
- Ruben Jacob de Bruijn (b. 2003), Dutch clothing designer

== Mathematics ==
In mathematics, de Bruijn may refer to one of the following topics named after:

- Nicolaas Govert de Bruijn (1918–2012), Dutch mathematician
  - De Bruijn sequence, a cyclic sequence of a given alphabet such that every length n subsequence appears exactly once
    - De Bruijn torus, a generalization of the De Bruijn sequence in two dimensions
    - De Bruijn graph, a graph representing overlaps between sequences of symbols
  - De Bruijn–Erdős theorem (disambiguation)
    - De Bruijn–Erdős theorem (graph theory), a theorem about graph coloring
    - De Bruijn–Erdős theorem (incidence geometry), a theorem about lines determined by points in the projective plane
  - De Bruijn index, a nameless representation of the λ calculus
  - De Bruijn–Newman constant, Λ, a mathematical constant related to the Riemann zeta-function
  - De Bruijn notation, a syntax for terms in the λ calculus
  - De Bruijn's theorem, a theorem regarding the packing of bricks into boxes

== Politics ==
- Adrianus Cornelis de Bruijn (1887–1968), Dutch politician
- Hans de Bruijn (b. 1962), Dutch political scientist
- Maria Brigitta Catherina de Bruijn (1938–2006), Dutch GreenLeft politician

== Sports ==
- Brian de Bruijn (b. 1954), Dutch-Canadian ice hockey player
- Chantal de Bruijn (b. 1976), Dutch field hockey defender
- Daniëlle de Bruijn (b. 1978), Dutch water polo player
- Frans de Bruijn Kops (1886–1979), Dutch footballer
- Inge de Bruijn (b. 1973), Dutch swimmer
- Jean Paul de Bruijn (born 1965), Dutch billiards player
- Matthijs de Bruijn (b. 1977), Dutch waterpolo player
- Meike de Bruijn (born 1970), Dutch racing cyclist
- Nick de Bruijn (b. 1987), Dutch racing driver

== See also ==
- Bruijn
- De Bruyn
- De Bruin
- De Bruyne
