= Musca depicta =

Visual depiction of a fly in paintings

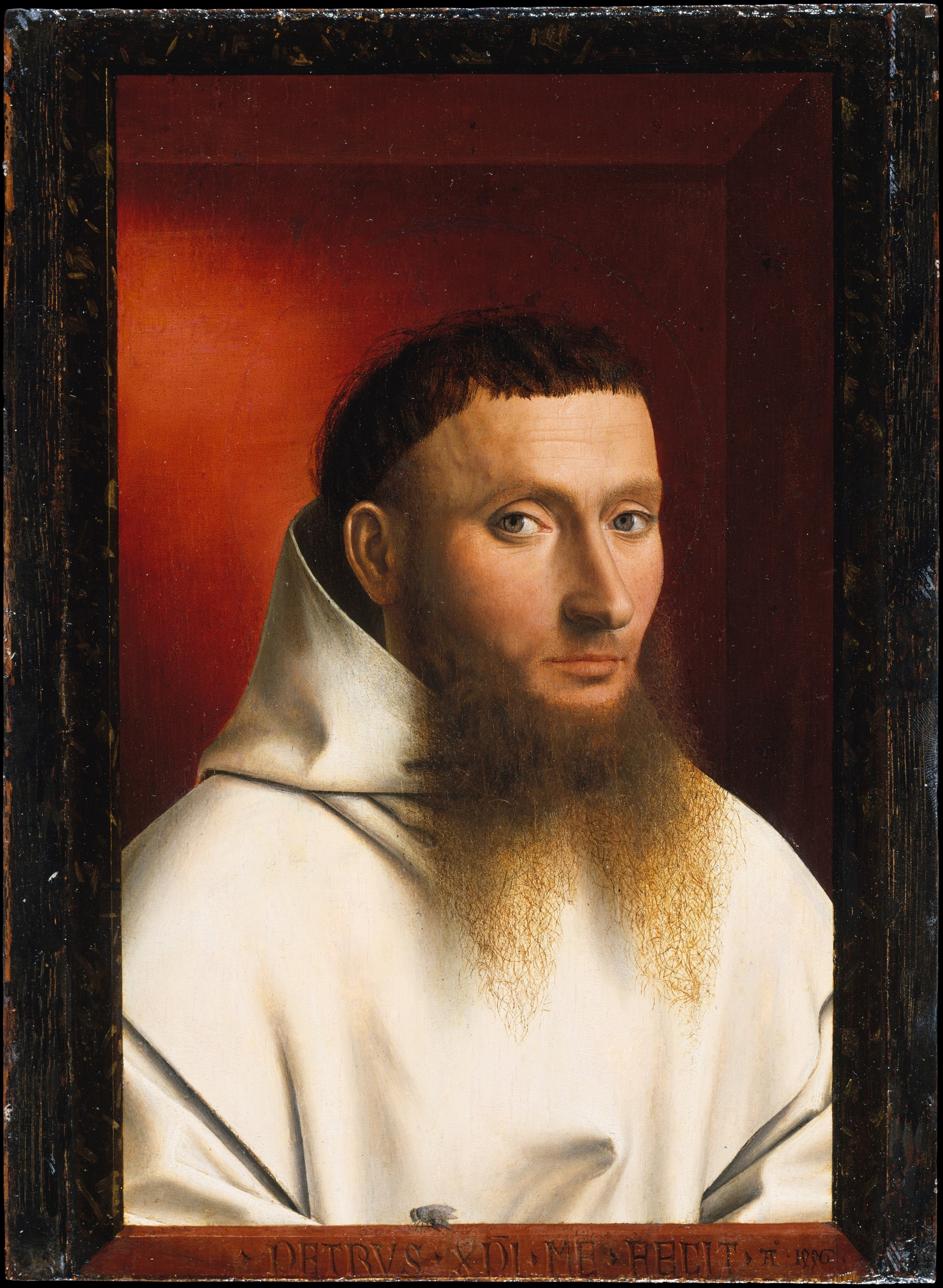
Petrus Christus's Portrait of a Carthusian has a musca depicta perched on the trompe-l'œil frame.

Musca depicta ("painted fly" in Latin; plural: muscae depictae) is a depiction of a fly as a conspicuous element of various paintings. The feature was widespread in 15th- and 16th-century European paintings, and its presence has been subject to various interpretations by art historians.

== Interpretations ==
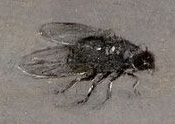
Detail from Clara Peeters's "still life".

James N. Hogue, writing in the Encyclopedia of Insects, lists the following reasons behind musca depicta: as a jest; to symbolize the worthiness of even minor "objects of creation"; as an exercise in artistic privilege; as an indication that the portrait is post mortem; and as an imitation of works of previous painters. Many art historians argue that the fly holds religious significance, carrying connotations of sin, corruption or mortality.

Another theory is that Renaissance artists strove to demonstrate their mastery in portraying nature, with André Chastel writing that musca depicta became as an "emblem of the avant-garde in painting" at the time. There exist several anecdotes from the biographies of various artists who, as apprentices, allegedly painted a fly with such skill as to fool their teacher into believing it was real. Well-known examples are those about Giotto as an apprentice of Cimabue and Andrea Mantegna and his master Francesco Squarcione. Kandice Rawlings argues that since these anecdotes were widespread, they contributed to the humorous interpretation of some trompe-l'œil flies.

Commenting on the Czech portrait of Francysk Skaryna, Ilya Lemeshkin brings attention to the fly painted on a corner of a page of Skaryna's Bible. He argues that the function of the fly is to secularize the image – in other words, to indicate that the depicted object is not a cult object to be venerated, but simply a painting.

Andor Pigler surmises that the painted fly served an apotropaic function, that is to serve as a type of magic intended to turn away harm or evil influences, as in deflecting misfortune or averting the evil eye. Kandice Rawlings challenges this notion, writing that Pigler fails to take into account other traditions associated with flies.

== Trompe-l'œil fly ==
Both Konečný, writing about Dürer's Feast of the Rosary (copy), and Lemeshkin, writing about Skaryna's portrait, observe the flies painted in each do not exactly "sit" on the underlying painted objects, but rather sit above them. Based on this observation, as well as noting the disproportionately large relative size of the flies compared with the other depicted objects, Konečný argues that this was intended as a trompe-l'œil (illusion), that the fly sits on the painting. He also remarks that the fly in the Portrait of a Carthusian (pictured above) serves to intensify the illusion of the trompe-l'œil frame. The Portrait of a Carthusian, dated about 1446, is the earliest known example of panel painting with a trompe-l'œil fly.

Trompe-l'œil flies are recognized in over twenty Netherlandish, German, and north Italian paintings dated between 1450 and the 1510s, and are analysed by André Chastel in a book eponymously dedicated to musca depicta. Of them, eight are portraits, thirteen are religious miniatures, and only two are large-size works. Chastel remarks that trompe-l'œil flies were a passing fad, with artists later having found other ways to demonstrate their skill.

== In popular culture ==
The musca depicta is a recurring topic in the 2019 film, The Burnt Orange Heresy. The main character, an art dealer, explains to a woman he meets that it signifies corruption.

== Gallery ==
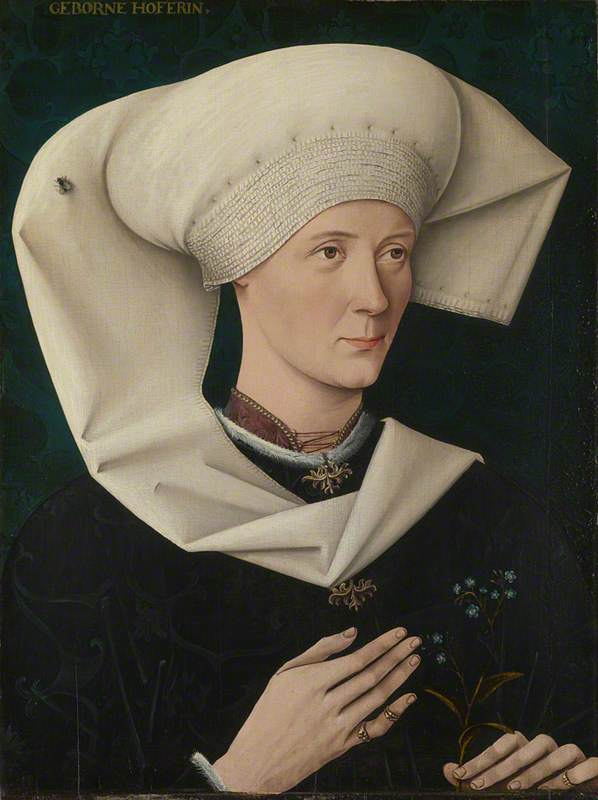
Anonymous, Portrait of a Woman of the Hofer Family

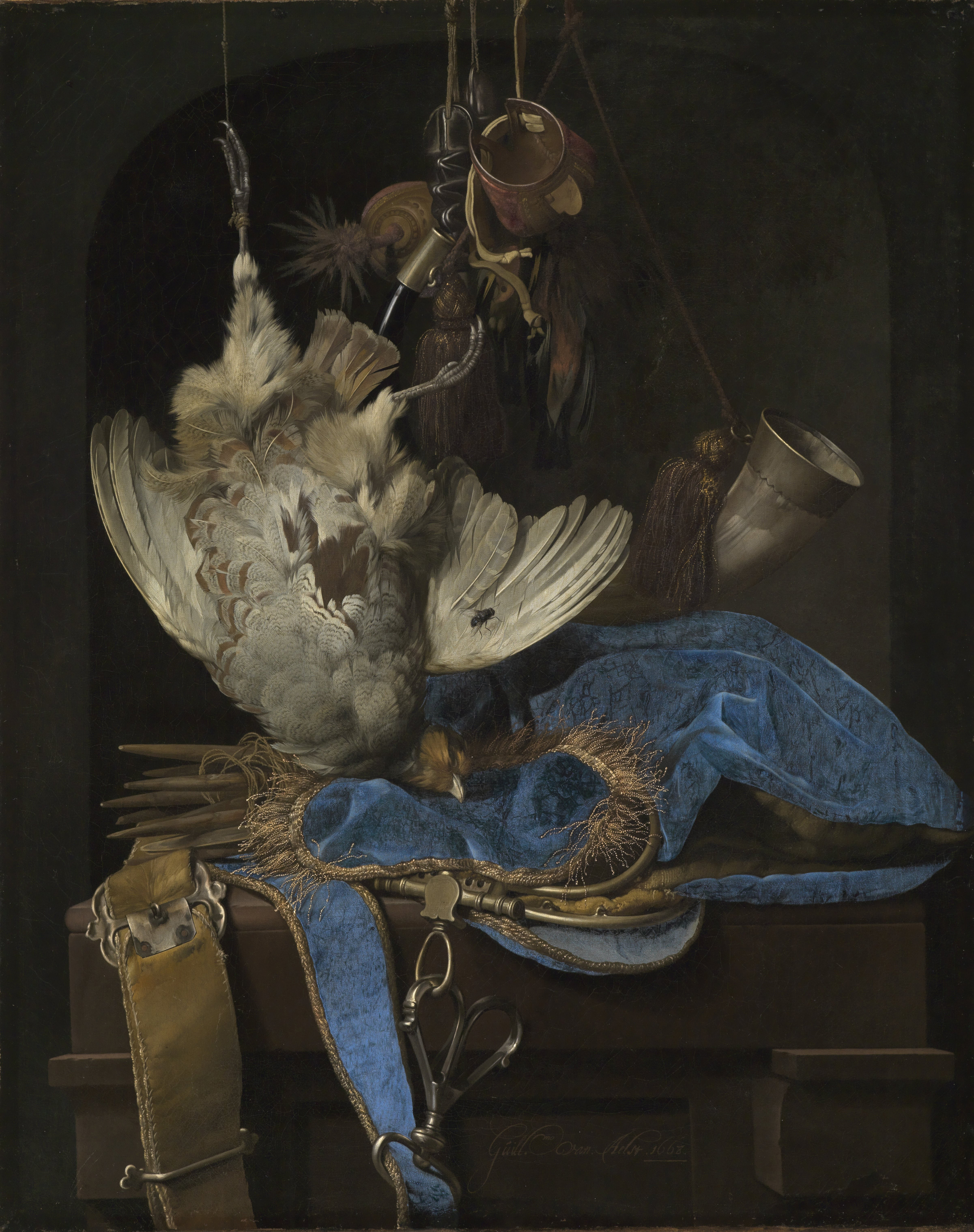
Willem van Aelst, Still Life with Hunting Equipment

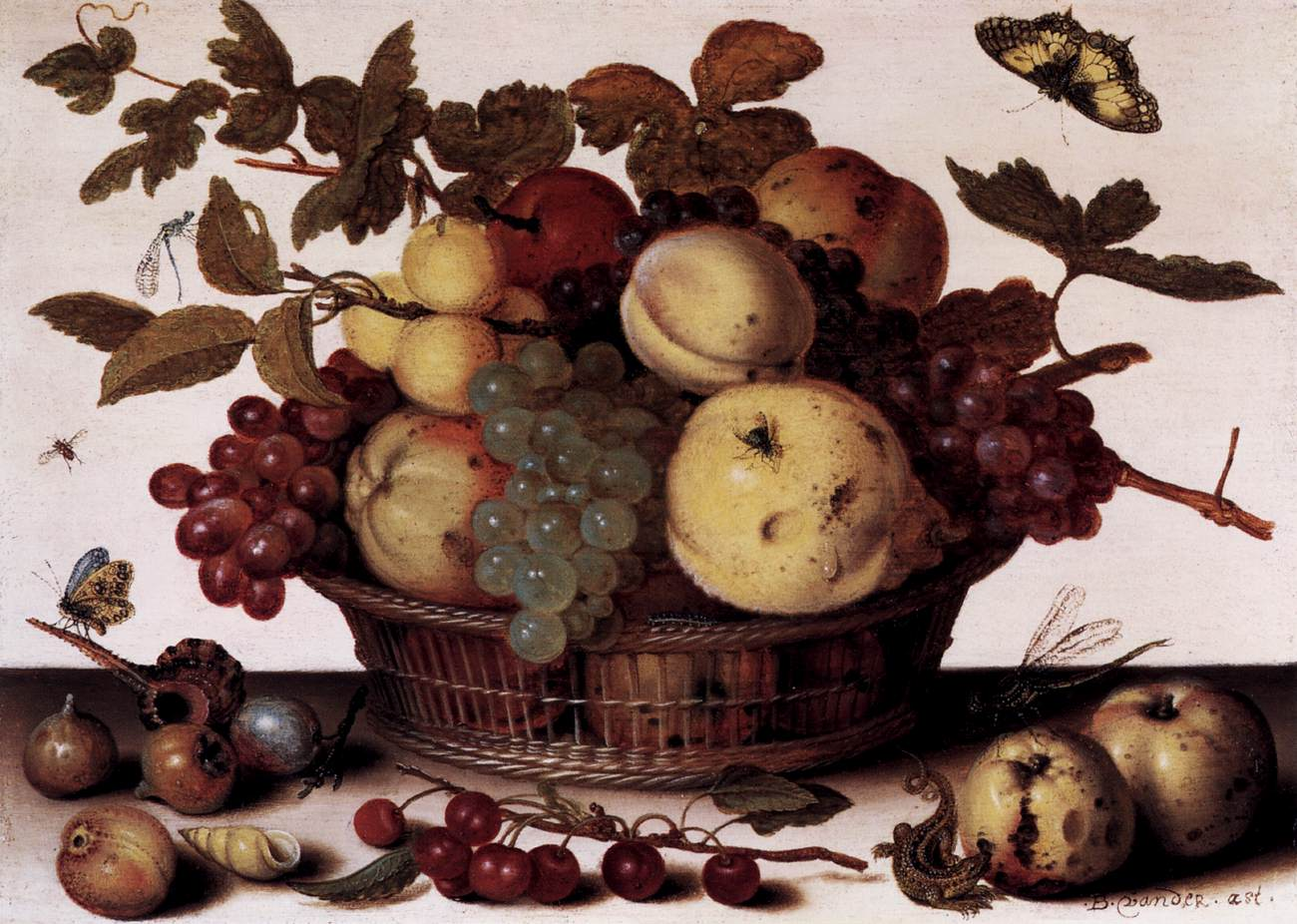
Balthasar van der Ast, Basket of Fruits

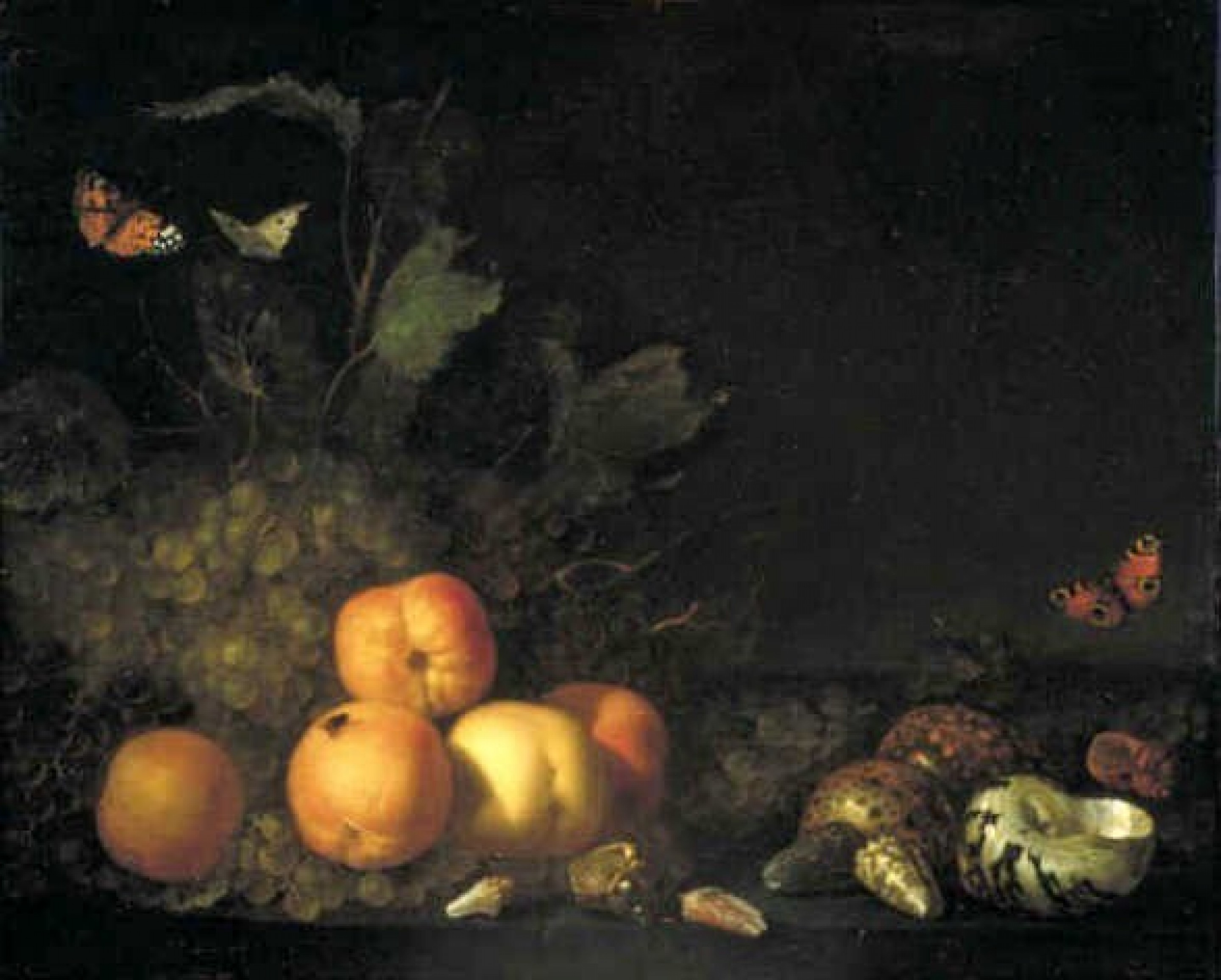
Abraham van Calraet, Stilleven met vruchten en schelpen

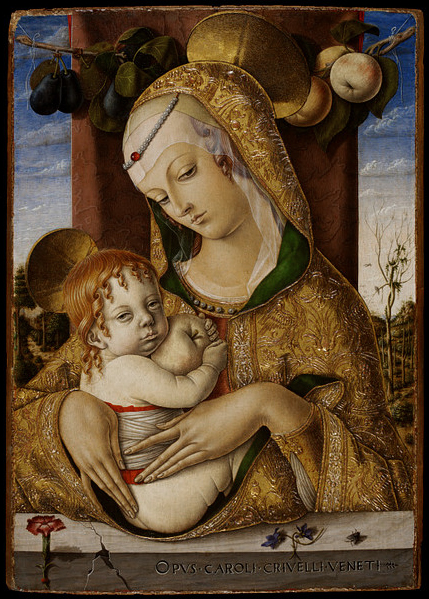
Carlo Crivelli, Madonna and Child

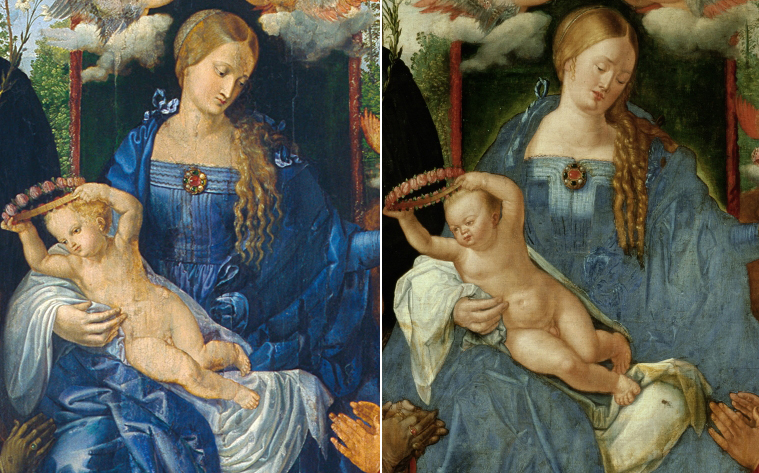
comparison of Albrecht Dürer's versions of the Feast of the Rosary

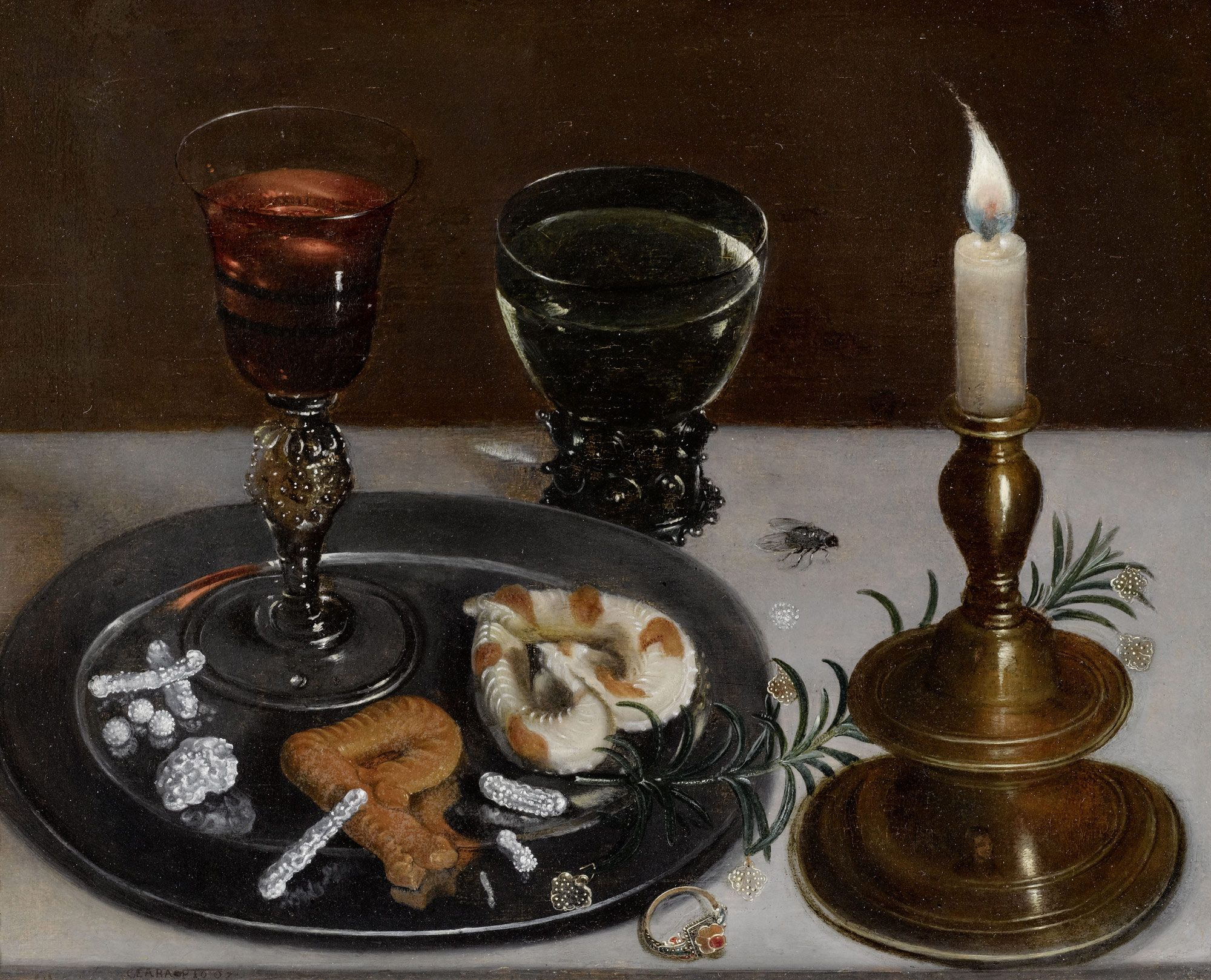
Clara Peeters, Still life with dainties, rosemary, wine, jewels and a burning candle

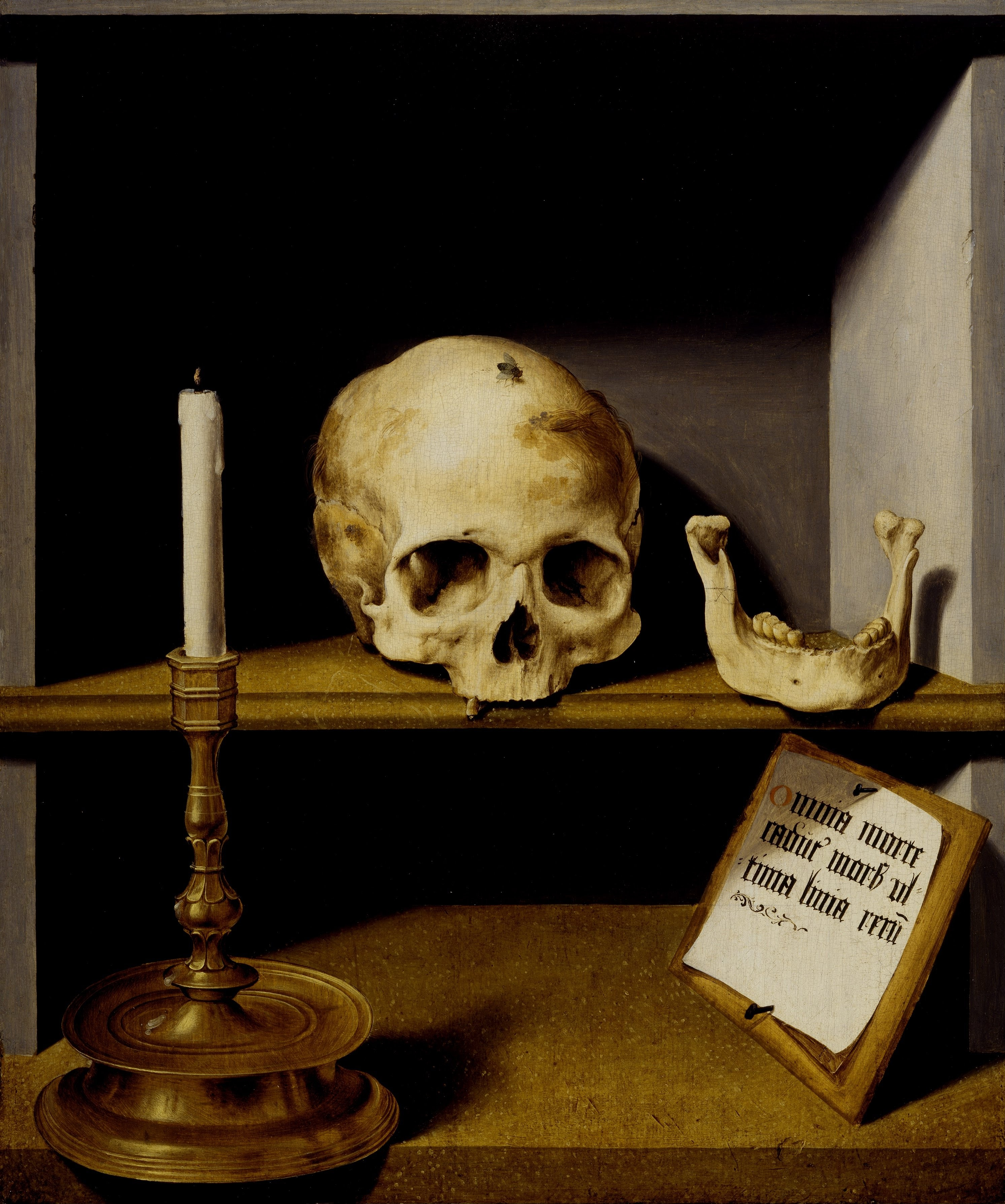
Barthel Bruyn the Elder, Vanitas (1524)
