= Bruhin =

Bruhin is a surname. Notable people with the surname include:

- Ferdinand Bruhin (1908–1986), Swiss footballer
- John Bruhin (1964–2022), American football player
- Ursula Bruhin (born 1970), Swiss snowboarder

== See also ==
- Bruin (surname)
