= De Bruin =

De Bruin is a Dutch surname meaning "the brown" or "the brown one". It is common in the Netherlands (17,650 people in 2007). People named "de Bruin" include:

- Christiaan de Bruin (b. 1993), South African rugby player
- Christine de Bruin (b. 1989), Canadian bobsledder.
- Corrie de Bruin (b. 1976), Dutch discus thrower and shot putter
- Erik de Bruin (b. 1963), Dutch discus thrower and shot putter
- Eugene DeBruin (1933–c.1968), American Air Force pilot and Vietnam POW
- Hugo de Bruin (b. c.1960), Dutch rock guitarist
- Johannes de Bruin (1620–1675), Dutch philosopher, physicist and mathematic
- Leana de Bruin (b. 1977), South Africa and New Zealand netball player
- Liesbeth de Bruin (b. 1946), Dutch rower
- Luan de Bruin (b. 1993), South African rugby player
- Marlize de Bruin (b. 1990), South African netball and rugby sevens player
- Michelle de Bruin (b. 1967), British sculptor
- Michelle Smith de Bruin (b. 1969), Irish swimmer
- Monique de Bruin (born 1965), Dutch cyclist
- Monique de Bruin (born 1977), American fencer
- Petra de Bruin (b. 1962), Dutch cyclist
- Swys de Bruin (b. 1960), South African rugby coach

De Bruine

- Jan de Bruine (1903–1983), Dutch equestrian

== See also ==
- Bruin (surname)
- De Bruijn
- De Bruyn
- De Bruyne
