= Irish Independent Sports Star Awards =

Irish Independent Sport Star Awards
- Description: Annual awards ceremony honoring top achievements by Irish athletes, teams, and sporting figures
- Country: Ireland
- Presented by: Irish Independent

The Irish Independent Sport Star Awards are a recognition of the best achievements in sport from Irish individuals and teams within Ireland and internationally. The awards is an annual event that takes place in December and is a star-studded event with leading Irish sports managers, athletes and officials in attendance. Awards go to: Sport Star of the Year, Young Sport Star of the Year, and a special Hall of Fame recipient.

== History ==
The awards began in 1989 with Tipperary's Nicky English the very first Sport Star of the Year. The Irish Independent Sport Star Hall of Fame award began in 1995 with Christy O'Connor Sr; and in 2004, Cathy Gannon was the first Young Sport Star of the Year. In over a quarter of a century, previous award winners have included Rory McIlroy, Katie Taylor, Sonia O'Sullivan, Packie Bonner, Michael Carruth, Padraig Harrington, Roy Keane and Aidan O'Brien.

The most recent winners in 2015 were Leona Maguire for Young Sport Star, Kevin Moran in the Hall of Fame, and Paul O'Connell for Sport Star of the Year.

== Sports Star of the Year Winners ==
By Year

Year	Winner	Sport
1989	Nicky English	Hurling
1990	Packie Bonner	Soccer
1991	Catherina McKiernan	Athletics
1992	Michael Carruth	Boxing
1993	Dermot Weld	Horse Racing
1994	Sonia O'Sullivan	Athletics
1995	Clare team	Hurling
1996	Michelle de Bruin	Swimming
1997	Maurice Fitzgerald	Gaelic Football
1998	Sonia O'Sullivan	Athletics
1999	Roy Keane	Soccer
2000	Johnny Murtagh & John Oxx	Horse Racing
2001	Aidan O'Brien	Horse Racing
2002	Padraig Harrington	Golf
2003	Peter Canavan	Gaelic Football
2004	Ronan O'Gara	Rugby
2005	Ruby Walsh	Horse Racing
2006	Derval O'Rourke	Athletics
2007	Padraig Harrington	Golf
2008	Padraig Harrington	Golf
2009	Brian O'Driscolll	Rugby
2010	Graeme McDowell	Golf
2011	Rory McIlroy	Golf
2012	Katie Taylor	Boxing
2013	Tony McCoy	Horse Racing
2014	Katie Taylor	Boxing
2015	Paul O'Connell	Rugby
2017	Aidan O’Brien	Horse Racing
2018	Johnny Sexton	Rugby
2020	Sam Bennett	Cycling
2021	Rachael Blackmore	Horse Racing
2022	David Clifford	Gaelic Football
2024	Daniel Wiffen	Swimming
2025	Rory McIlroy	Golf

== Hall of Fame Winners ==
By Year

Year	Winner	Sport
1995	Christy O'Connor Sr	Golf
1996	Jack Kyle	Rugby
1997	Mick O'Connell	Gaelic Football
1998	John Giles	Soccer
1999	John Doyle	Hurling
2000	Tommy Wade	Showjumping
2001	Tom Kiernan	Rugby
2002	Kevin O'Flanagan	Soccer, Rugby, Athletics
2003	Paddy Mullins	Horse Racing
2004	Eddie Keher	Hurling
2005	Sean Boylan	Gaelic Football
2006	Charlie Hurley	Soccer
2007	Maeve Kyle	Athletics
2008	Micheal O'Muircheartaigh	Commentator
2009	Dr. Ronnie Delany	Athletics
2010	Jack Charlton	Soccer
2011	Mick O'Dwyer	Gaelic Football
2012	Jimmy Magee	Commentator
2013	Jim Bolger	Horse Racing
2014	Jimmy Keaveney	Gaelic Football
2015	Kevin Moran	Soccer
2023	Paul McGrath	Gaelic Football

== Padraig Power Young Sports Star of the Year Winners ==
By Year

Year	Winner	Sport
2004	Cathy Gannon	Horse Racing
2005	Rory McIlroy	Golf
2006	Katie Taylor	Boxing
2007	Katie Taylor	Boxing
2008	Joe Canning	Hurling
2009	Grainne Murphy	Swimming
2010	Brendan Maher	Hurling
2011	Joseph O'Brien	Horse Racing
2012	Joseph O'Brien	Horse Racing
2013	Tony Kelly	Hurling
2014	Bertram Allen	Showjumping
2015	Leona Maguire	Golf
2017	Con O'Callaghan	Gaelic Football
2019	Rhys McClenaghan	Gymnastics
2020	Oisín Mullin	Gaelic Football
2022	Israel Olatunde and Tadhg O'Donnell	Athletics / Boxin
2024	Róisín Ní Riain	Swimming
