= De Bruyne =

De Bruyne is a Dutch surname meaning "the brown one". The name is variably spelled Debruyne or De Bruijne as well. More common forms are De Bruin, De Bruijn, and De Bruyn.

People with this surname include:

- Kevin De Bruyne (born 1991), Belgian footballer
- Donatien de Bruyne (1871–1935), French biblical scholar
- Fred De Bruyne (1930–1994), Belgian road race cyclist
- Gustave De Bruyne (fl. 1920), Belgian long jumper
- Hector De Bruyne (1917–1995), Belgian politician
- Henri De Bruyne (1868–1892), Belgian Congo Free State sergeant
- Kamiel De Bruyne (born 1992), Belgian television producer
- Kris De Bruyne (1950–2021), Belgian singer
- Mattheus de Bruyne (1895–1973), Dutch military leader
- Norman de Bruyne (1904–1997), British aircraft engineer and industrialist
- Prudent De Bruyne (1905–?), Belgian cyclist
- Rykel de Bruyne, Dutch malacologist

== See also ==
- De Bruyn
- De Bruijn
- De Bruin
