= Portrait of a Carthusian =

Painting by Petrus Christus

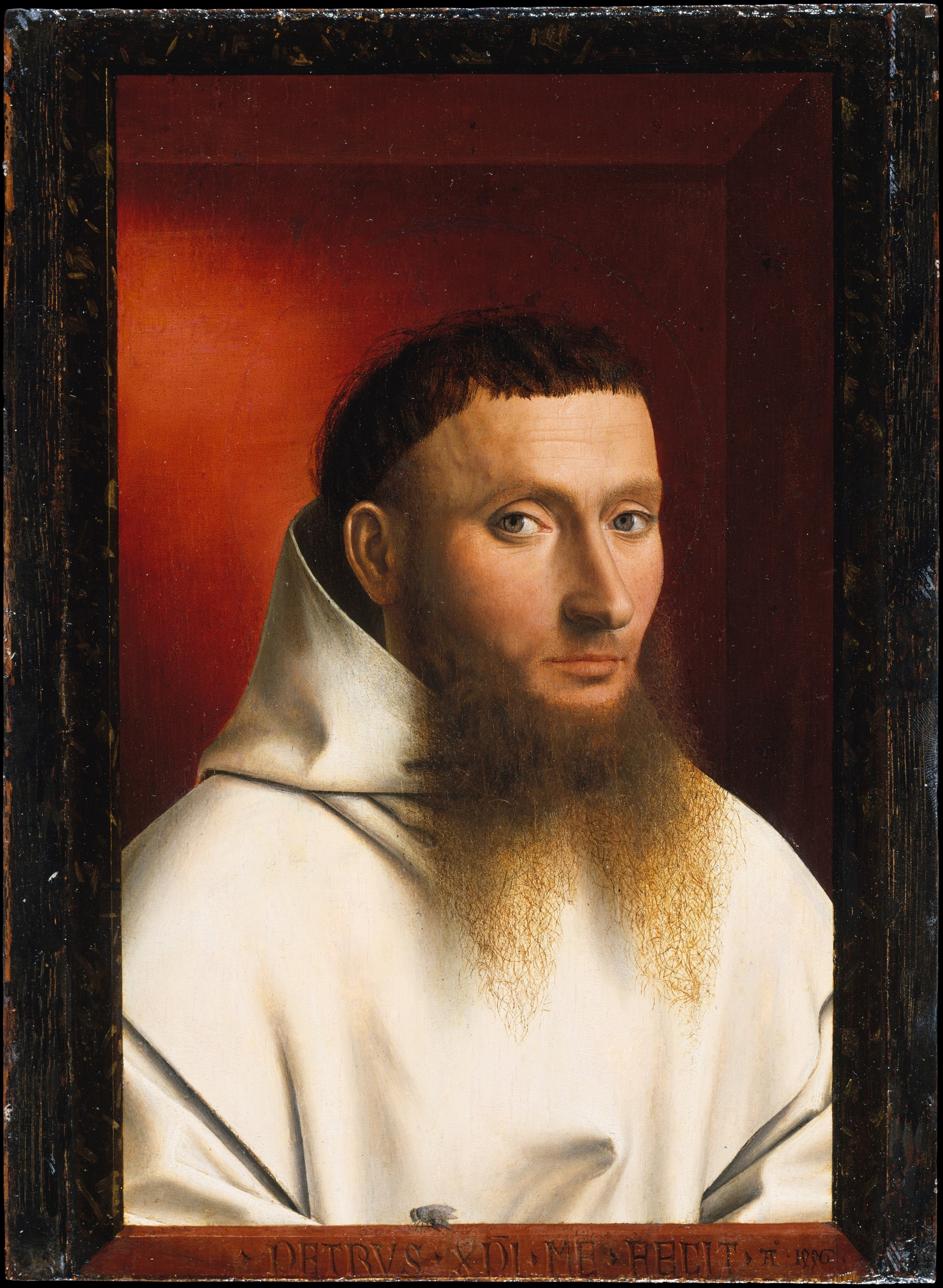
- Artist: Petrus Christus
- Year: 1446
- Type: oil on wood
- Dimensions: 29.2 cm × 21.6 cm (11 1/2 in × 8 1/2 in)
- Location: Metropolitan Museum of Art
- Accession: 49.7.19

Portrait of a Carthusian is a painting in oils on oak panel by the Early Netherlandish painter Petrus Christus in 1446. The work is part of the Jules Bache Collection housed at the Metropolitan Museum of Art in New York City.

It is regarded as a masterpiece of Northern Ressainance painting and, because of the fly painted towards the bottom of the painting, a prominent, early example of trompe-l'œil. In 2020, the painting became a meme after the subject was compared to a Northeast Philadelphia local.

== Description ==
Portrait of a Carthusian depicts a three-quarter portrait of anonymous Carthusian monk captured in mid-turn, gazing directly at the viewer. Because the monk's body is turned to his left, he must look over his right shoulder to gaze at the viewer, creating a somewhat cumbersome diagonal pose. Petrus Christus balances this out by shifting the axis of the monk's face to the right, placing him just off center. By further modeling the monk's right shoulder more than his left shoulder, Christus draws one side of the body closer to the viewer, adding more depth to the work. The proportions of the monk's face have also been exaggerated; the nose and eyes having been purposefully elongated. The overall effect is something of an exaggerated silhouette, a compositional technique not often found in Early Netherlandish painting.

The Monk is bathed in intense light, setting his figure dramatically against the space that he occupies. While this strong, raking light is typical of contemporaries like Jan van Eyck, Christus’ addition of a second, opposing lighting source behind the monk marks this portrait as distinctive. The light on the left seems to be a reflection from within the room, yet the light bathing the monk seems to be coming from an external source, perhaps an unseen window. The result is that light comes from both in and outside the pictorial space, with the monk (particularly along the hood of his cloak) being the meeting point of the two. The monk is therefore framed by a two-source lighting structure, allowing Christus to employ a much fuller and richer spectrum of colors and shading than a single-source lighting structure would. This complex lighting scheme is the reason Portrait of a Carthusian appears fully 3-dimensional and realistic.

=== The fly and trompe-l'œil ===
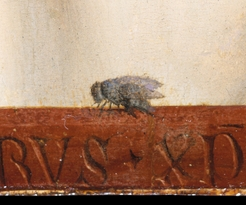
Detail with inscriptions and fly

Portrait of a Carthusian sports a trompe-l'œil fly on the center of its trompe-l'œil lower frame. The addition of trompe-l'œil flies to works of art is believed to have begun in the 15th century, right as Christus became active. Art Historians are generally split between two different interpretations of their use. Many art historians believe the fly to hold religious symbolism, functions as connotations of sin, corruption, mortality, etc. Art historians believe that a fly was used to evoke such images in connection with Satan’s moniker Beelzebub—the Lord of the Flies. More recently, art historians are beginning to view the inclusion of trompe-l'œil flies as a professional calling card, with art historian Felix Thülemann describing it as “a selfconscious representation of superior painterly prowess. It is believed that this is why the fly generally appears next to the artist’s signature (the fly’s position right next to ‘Petrus ΧΡΙ Me Fecit’ hinting that the fly might be the referent of ‘me’ rather than the painting.)

== Halo and 1994 restoration ==
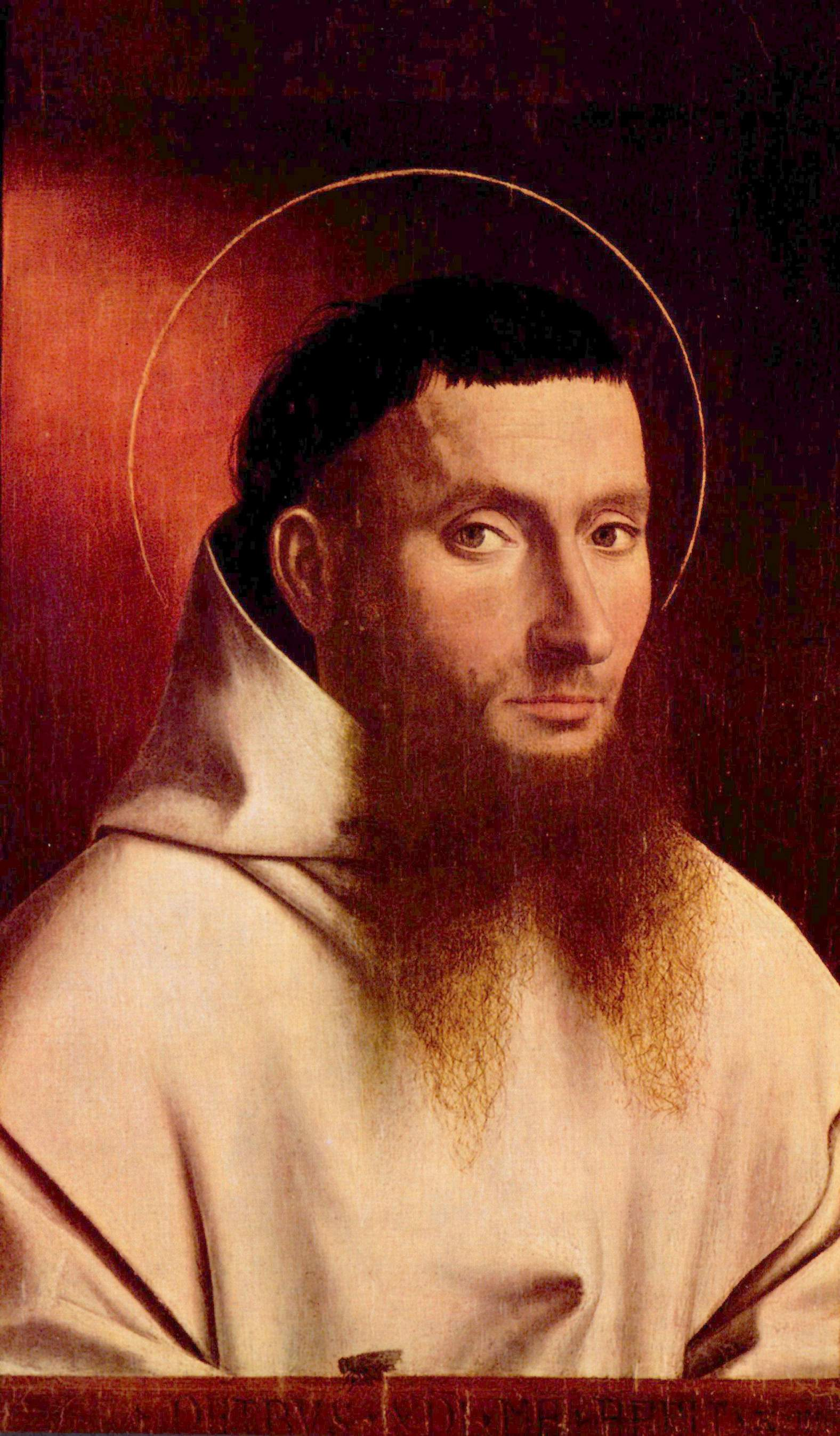
Portrait of a Carthusian before removal of the halo

Portrait of a Carthusian featured a halo above the monk's head when it was acquired by the Metropolitan Museum of Art in 1944. However, halos are extremely rare in Early Netherlandish painting, and the one in Portrait of a Carthusian had long been an object of speculation. Finally in 1994, in preparation for the Met's exhibition Petrus Christus: Renaissance Master of Bruges, the authenticity of the halo was publicly examined by a panel of Early Netherlandish specialists and determined to be an addition.

The team generally agreed that halo was probably added in Spain in the 17th century—imitating an Italian trend—where it became part of the collection of Don Ramon de Oms, viceroy of Majorca, who sold the work to American industrialist Jules Bache in 1911. The team recommended that the halo be removed to make the painting more aesthetically authentic. Christus was one of the first Netherlandish painters to really play with the illusion of space and light. The addition of the halo, though, forced the viewer to look at the foreground and therefore framed the space in a way Christus never intended. Since the removal of the halo, the Met has gone on to delete other dubious halos from Christus works, most notably in Portrait of a Goldsmith.
