= Rykel de Bruyne =

Dutch malacologist

Rykel de Bruyne is a Dutch malacologist.

He is the national coordinator of the ANEMOON Foundation's Dutch Mollusc Atlas Project (Dutch: Atlasproject Nederlandse Mollusken), and is also on the foundation's advisory board.

He worked for the "National Institute for Fisheries Research" (Rijks Instituut voor Visserij Onderzoek, RIVO) at the Institute for Marine Resources & Ecosystem Studies, the former "Geological Survey" (Rijks Geologische Dienst), the Muséum national d'histoire naturelle in Paris, the National Museum of Natural History in Leiden (Rijksmuseum van Natuurlijke Historie) and the Expert Center for Taxonomic Identification (ETI) in Amsterdam. He is also affiliated with the Department of Malacology of the Zoological Museum in Amsterdam (Zoölogisch Museum Amsterdam). He was also involved with Spirula, the Dutch malacological journal.

A review of de Bruyne's Field Guide to Shells (Dutch: Veldgids Schelpen) considers it to be "the most important shell guide for the North Sea region at the moment".

== Selected works ==
- (in Dutch) Boer T. W. de & Bruyne R. H. de (1991). Schelpen van de Friese Waddeneilanden (1st edition). Fryske Akademy & Backhuys publ. ISBN 90-73348-21-8, 292 pp. (2nd edition: 300 pp.).
- (in Dutch) Bruyne R. H. de (1991). Schelpen van de Nederlandse kust. Jeugdbondsuitgeverij Stichting Uitgeverij KNNV, 165 pp.
- (in Dutch) Bruyne R. H. de, Bank R. A., Adema J. P. H. M. & Perk F. A. (1994). Nederlandse naamlijst van de weekdieren (Mollusca) van Nederland en België. Feestuitgave ter gelegenheid van het zestigjarig jubileum van de Nederlandse Malacologische Vereniging. Backhuys, Leiden. 149 pp. ISBN 90-73348-33-1.
- (in Dutch) Bruyne R. de & Neckheim T. (eds.) (2001). Van Nonnetje tot Tonnetje. De recente en fossiele weekdieren (slakken en schelpen) van Amsterdam, Schuyt & Co, Haarlem, 207 pp.
- (in Dutch) Bruyne R. H. de (2003). Geïllustreerde Schelpenencyclopedie, Rebo Productions, ISBN 90-366-1361-2.
- (in Dutch) Bruyne, R.H. de, Wallbrink, H. & Gmelig Meyling, A.W., 2003. Bedreigde en verdwenen land- en zoetwatermollusken in Nederland (Mollusca). Basisrapport met voorstel voor de Rode Lijst. European Invertebrate Survey Nederland (EIS), Leiden & Stichting ANEMOON, Heemstede. 88 pag.
- (in Dutch) Bruyne R. H. de (2004). Veldgids Schelpen. KNNV Uitgeverij, 234 pp., ISBN 90-5011-140-8
- (in Dutch) Bruyne R. H. de & Boer Th. W. de (2008). Schelpen van de Waddeneilanden. Gids van de schelpen en weekdieren van Texel, Vlieland, Terschelling, Ameland en Schiermonnikoog. Fontaine Uitgevers. 359 pp., ISBN 978-90-5956-255-4.
- (in Dutch) Bruyne, R. H. de & Gmelig Meyling, A. W. (2019). Basisgids Strandvondsten. Kennismaking met het zeeleven langs de Nederlandse kust. 144 pp. Uitg. KNNV (with Stichting ANEMOON). ISBN 978-90-5011-685-5
- (in Dutch) Bruyne, R. H. de (2020). Veldgids Schelpen. Zeeschelpen en weekdieren uit ons Noordzeegebied. Zeist. KNNV Uitgeverij (with Stichting ANEMOON & JBU). 304 p. ISBN 978-90-5011-686-2
