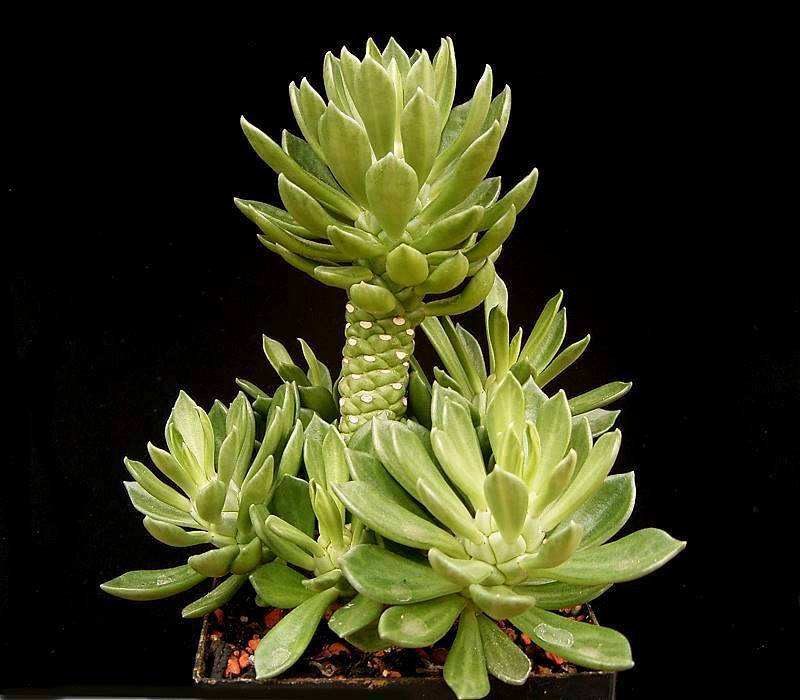

Scientific classification
- Kingdom: Plantae
- Clade: Tracheophytes
- Clade: Angiosperms
- Clade: Eudicots
- Clade: Rosids
- Order: Malpighiales
- Family: Euphorbiaceae
- Genus: Euphorbia
- Species: E. succulenta

Binomial name
- Euphorbia succulenta (Schweick.) Bruyns.

Synonyms
- List: Euphorbia neostapelioides Bruyns; Monadenium neostapelioides; Monadenium succulentum Schweick.

= Euphorbia succulenta =

Species of flowering plant

Euphorbia succulenta is a species of flowering plant in the family Euphorbiaceae native to eastern Africa. It is a succulent with stems that often arch or flop, eventually hanging as they grow. Leaves appear at the growing tips but persist for only a single season. The species shows significant variation in stem thickness, tubercle number and size, leaf shape, and inflorescence length.

== Taxonomy ==
Confusion has long existed between Euphorbia stapelioides and Euphorbia succulenta. The history of this confusion is as follows: In 1909, Ferdinand Albin Pax described Monadenium stapelioides. Later, in 1935, Herold Georg Wilhelm Johannes Schweickerdt published Monadenium succulentum, believing it represented a separate species. Over time, the two names came to be regarded as synonyms, with Monadenium stapelioides recognized as the earlier name and Monadenium succulentum gradually falling out of use.

In 2006, Peter Vincent Bruyns proposed transferring Monadenium stapelioides to the genus Euphorbia, but he was unable to use the name Euphorbia stapelioides because it was already occupied. He therefore created the new name Euphorbia neostapelioides. In 2007, after discovering an overlooked, older synonym that had priority, he formally established the correct name Euphorbia succulenta. This species remains uncommon in cultivation, and the plants sold under the name Euphorbia stapelioides are in fact Euphorbia succulenta, formerly Monadenium stapelioides.

== Description ==
Euphorbia succulenta, previously classified as Monadenium stapelioides, is a succulent subshrub characterized by a thick, fleshy central stem and many dark green branches marked with rhomboid, spirally arranged tubercles. The cylindrical, fleshy branches arise mainly from the base, though they may also emerge near the top of the main stem. They begin upright but become decumbent with age, eventually reaching about 12 inches (30 cm) long and 0.8 inches (2 cm) thick. The leaves are fleshy, deciduous, lance-shaped, and dark green—often mottled with purple—and typically grow at the tips of the branches at the ends of the tubercles. They measure up to 0.5 inches (1.2 cm) long and 0.25 inches (0.6 cm) wide and are shed seasonally.

=== Inflorescences ===
In spring and summer, it produces clusters of three greenish-white, pink-tinted cyathia at the ends of the branches. These small flower heads appear on short stalks from the axils of the tubercles, and while individually modest, they become quite showy when produced in abundance. The plant forms sharply three-angled fruit capsules, each with two toothed wings along the angles, containing pale grey seeds. The plant is notably variable, with differences observed in branch thickness, tubercle number and size, leaf form, and the length of its inflorescences. Seeds are 3.5 mm long, 2.8 mm wide, oblong, 4-angled, with truncate base, light grey, meticulously and shallowly tuberculate.

== Distribution ==
Euphorbia succulenta is native to Tanzania in the northern highlands and parts of Kenya in the Laikipia District. It is also recorded in Uganda. It is generally found in rocky grasslands and open acacia woodland on well-drained, lateritic soils.
