= ANEMOON Foundation =

The ANEMOON Foundation, in Dutch Stichting ANEMOON, is a foundation dedicated to the study of marine life in the Netherlands. "Anemoon" is a Dutch word that means anemone, as in sea anemone, a marine organism portrayed in the logo of the foundation, although here the word is used as an acronym, based on the Dutch words "ANalyse Educatie Marien Oecologisch ONderzoek", meaning "analysis, education and marine ecological research". ANEMOON was founded in 1993 to focus on encouraging and supporting research on marine fauna and flora that is carried out by volunteers, i.e. citizen scientists. ANEMOON is one of ten non-governmental data-managing organizations (PGOs, Particuliere Gegevensbeherende Organisaties) which compile data on the fauna and flora of the Netherlands; these ten PGOs feed data into the "Foundation for Flora and Fauna Research" and the "Nationale Databank Flora en Fauna", or NDFF, a conservation body.
