= De Bruijn–Erdős theorem =

The De Bruijn–Erdős theorem may refer to:

- De Bruijn–Erdős theorem (incidence geometry)
- De Bruijn–Erdős theorem (graph theory)
