= Barthel Bruyn the Younger =

German painter

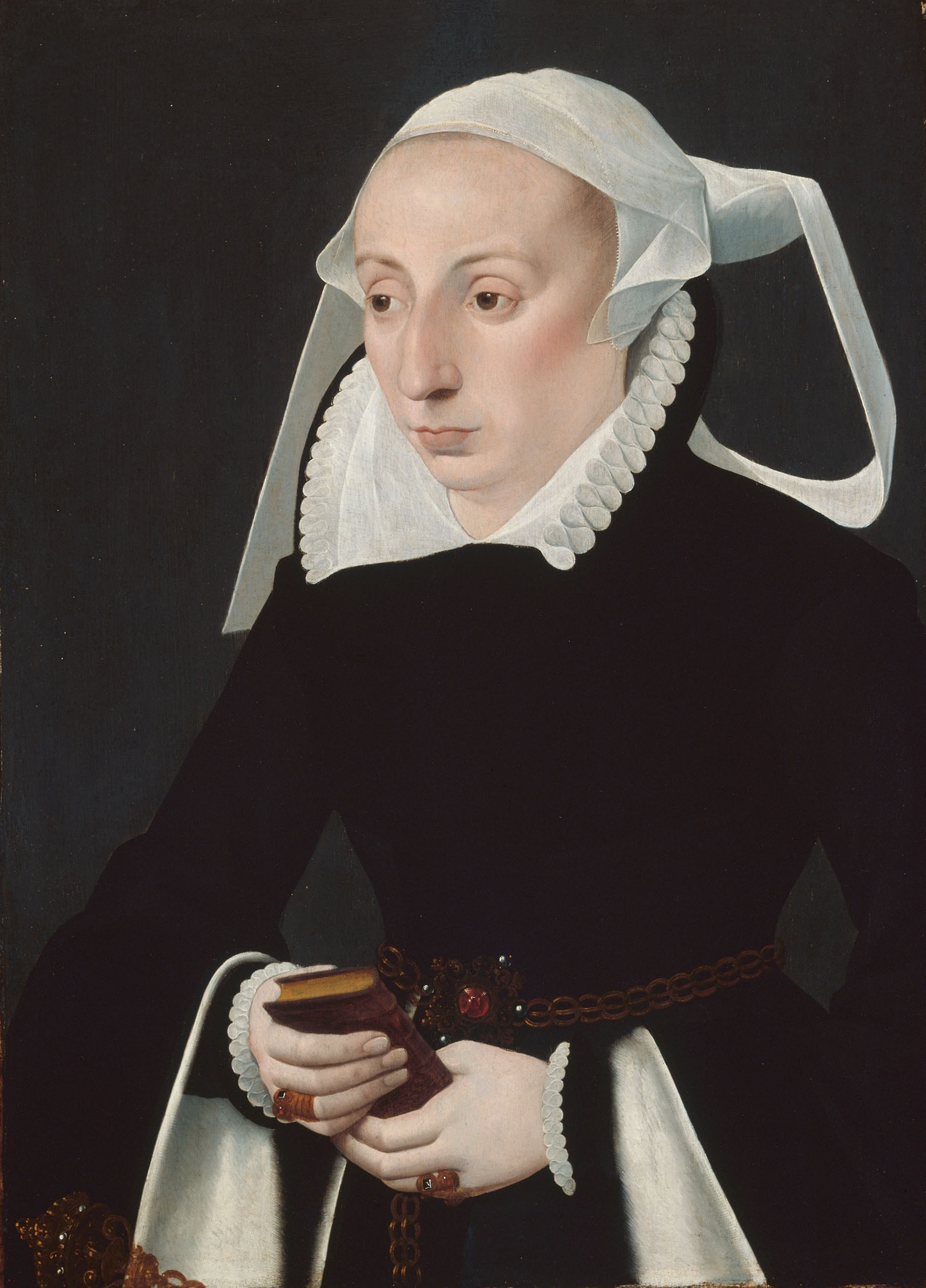
Woman with Prayerbook by Barthel Bruyn the Younger, c. 1560, oil on wood, Art Institute of Chicago

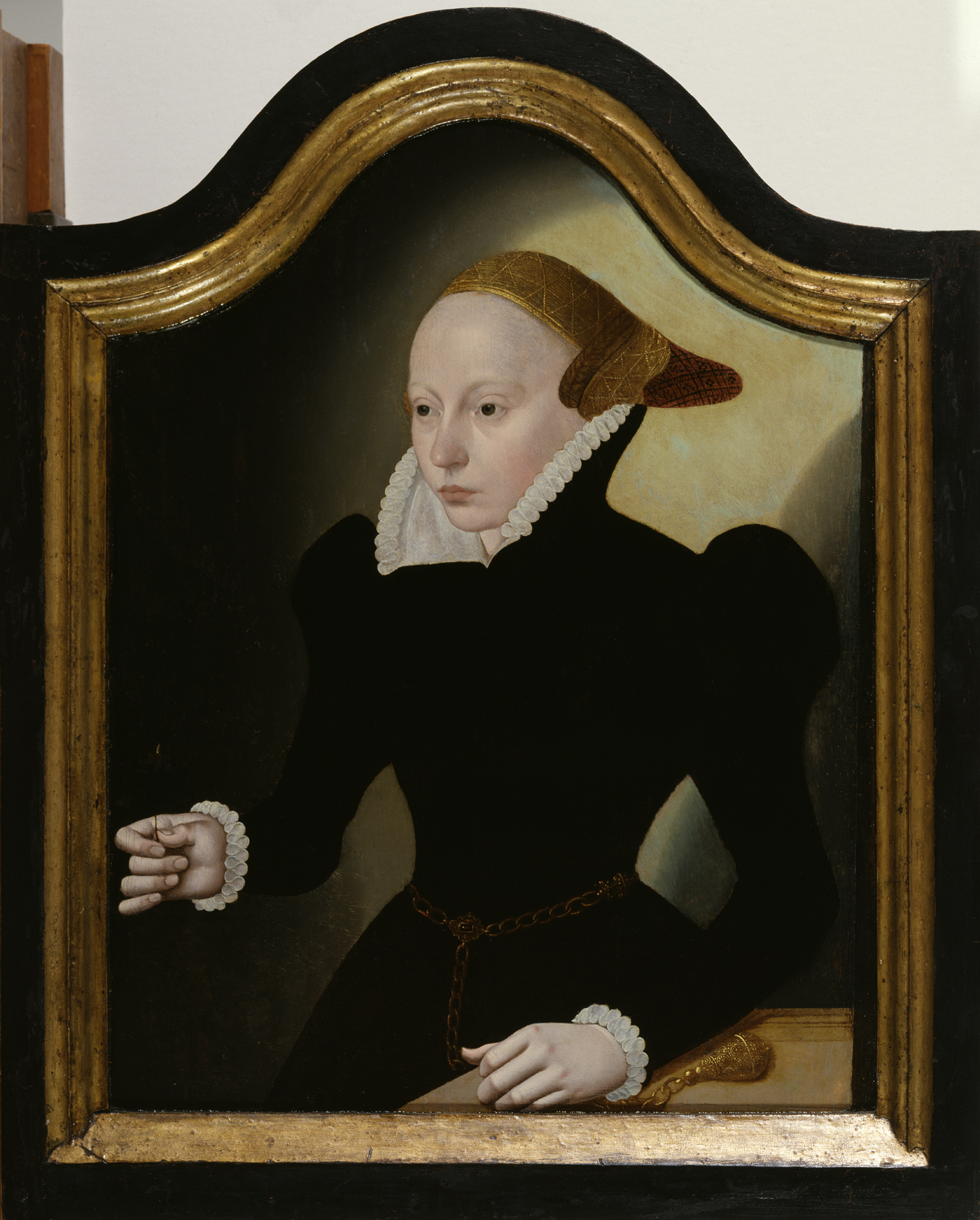
Portrait of a Young Woman with a Pink, c. 1560, Walters Art Museum

Bartholomäus Bruyn (c. 1530 – between 1607 and 1610), usually called Barthel Bruyn the Younger to distinguish him from his father of the same name, was a German painter active in Cologne. He is noted mainly for his portraits.

He was born in Cologne, where he trained in his father's workshop. From about 1547, he worked with his father and his older brother Arnt on a series of 57 scenes from the New Testament for the cloisters of Cologne's Karmelitenkloster. His only signed painting, a diptych of Christ Carrying the Cross and Vanitas (1560, in the Rheinisches Landesmuseum Bonn), has served as a touchstone for scholars who have identified Bruyn the Younger's body of work by style.

His portraits are similar in style to those of his father, but are slightly simpler. The sitters are usually depicted half-length against a flat background; the face is the center of attention, but costume details are crisply described, and prominence is given to the hands. Bruyn typically worked within a limited palette of harmonious colors: black, white, gray, and browns, enlivened by limpid flesh tones. His paintings are noted for their "effective contrasts of light and dark areas and exquisite rendering of surface textures".

After his father died in 1555, Bruyn inherited the workshop and continued to serve the same clientele. Like his father, he was active in the civic affairs of Cologne. He was elected to the Cologne City Council in 1567, 1580, and 1607. His failing eyesight caused him to cease painting and close the shop around 1590. He died in Cologne between 1607 and 1610.
