= Ettiene de Bruyn =

South African cricketer (born 1977)

Personal information
- Born: 31 March 1977 (age 49); Pretoria, Transvaal Province, South Africa
- Batting: Right-handed
- Role: wicket-keeper
- Relatives: Pierre de Bruyn (twin-brother)

Domestic team information
- Years: Team
- 1997: Northerns

Career statistics
| Competition | FC |
|---|---|
| Matches | 1 |
| Runs scored | 42 |
| Batting average | 21.00 |
| 100s/50s | 0/0 |
| Top score | 41 |
| Catches/stumpings | 1/– |
- Source: Cricinfo, 10 May 2024

Ettienne de Bruyn (born 31 March 1977) was a South African cricketer. He was a right-handed batsman and wicket-keeper who played for Northerns.

De Bruyn made a single first-class appearance for the team, during the 1997–98 UCB Bowl competition. Batting alongside twin brother, Pierre, Ettiene scored 41 runs in the first innings in which he batted, while his brother picked up his debut first-class century.

In the second innings of the match, as his brother scored just a single run, Ettiene did the same.
