= Sophia Adriana de Bruijn =

Dutch museum founder

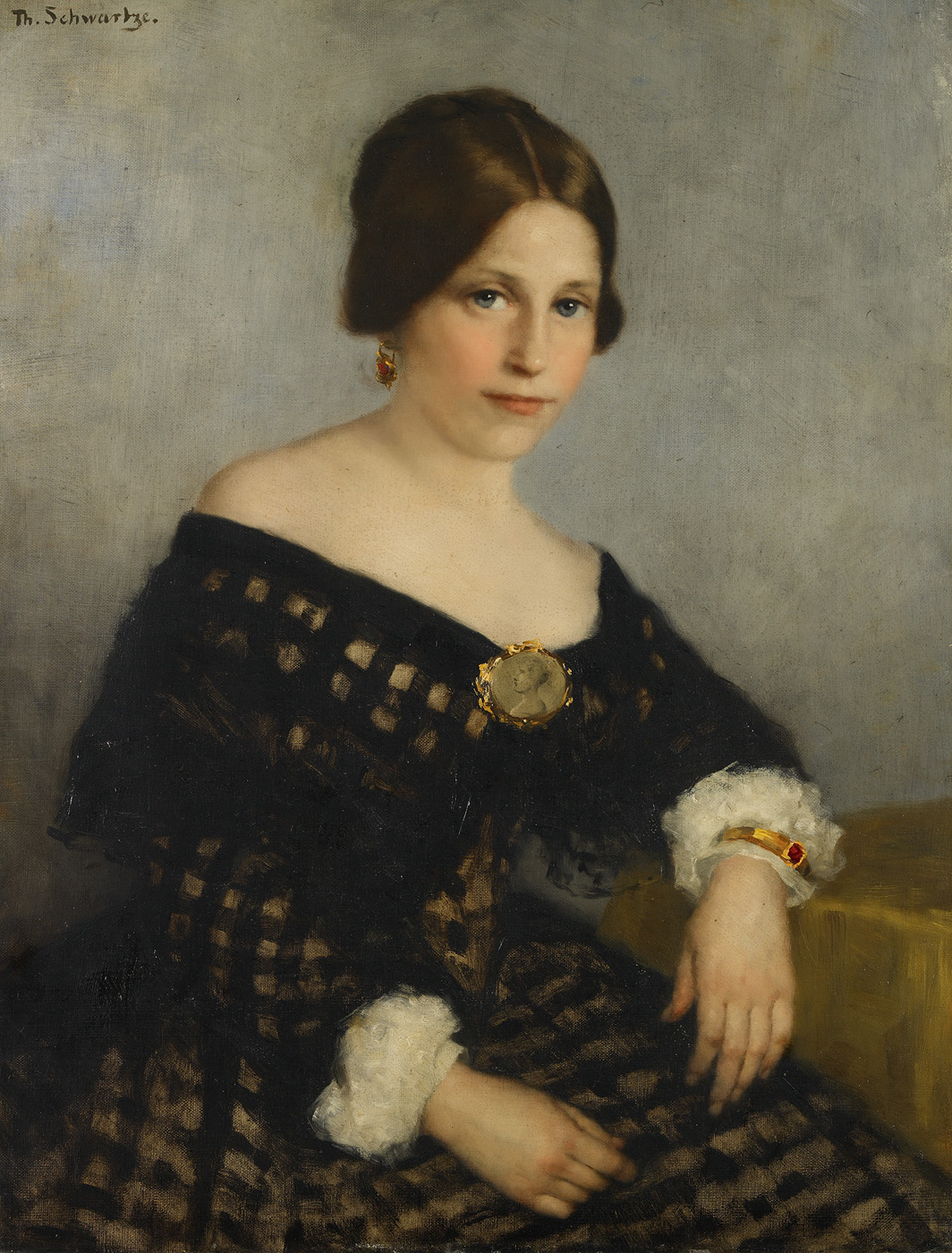
- Portrait by Thérèse Schwartze
- Born: 21 January 1816; Amsterdam
- Died: 4 March 1890 (aged 74); Amsterdam

Sophia Adriana de Bruijn or Sophia Adriana Lopez Suasso-de Bruyn (1816 – 1890) was a Dutch museum founder in Amsterdam.

Sophia was born in Amsterdam as the daughter of a well-to-do Catholic family and enjoyed travelling and collecting antiquities, paintings, jewelry and curiosities. She married in 1860 relatively late in life in England with the Dutch nobleman jonkheer Augustus Pieter Lopez Suasso (1804-1877). Her husband was a member of the Portuguese-Jewish community in Amsterdam and he converted to Catholicism to marry her. Without children, the couple spent much of their time travelling and Sophia was able to continue her collecting. She specialized in miniature silver and kept this in large cabinets made to order in her home, which she opened to friends and relatives. The collection was reported to have 360 jewelry items, miniature boxes and timepieces. After her husband died in 1877 she continued to collect. She documented each purchase carefully, so for example in one of her booklets between notes for the cost of washing and butter there is mention of a brooch and earring set from Tiger teeth.

In her will she left her fortune to the City of Amsterdam and stipulated that a museum in her name should be formed that would show off her collection and cost one guilder entry fee. The museum was called the Suasso Museum and was opened 14 September 1895 in what is currently part of the Stedelijk Museum, but only four rooms were devoted to her collection and the rest was used to exhibit rescued interiors from previous Amsterdam demolition work, and modern art that didn't fit in the Rijksmuseum, such as Van Gogh paintings. In 1941 the entry fee was waived as it was considered too expensive.

Bruijn died in Amsterdam. Though she was still alive when work was started on the museum, soon after her death the curator of the Stedelijk determined that her collection was not worthy of his museum and he began to reduce the collection drastically in order to make room for modern art.

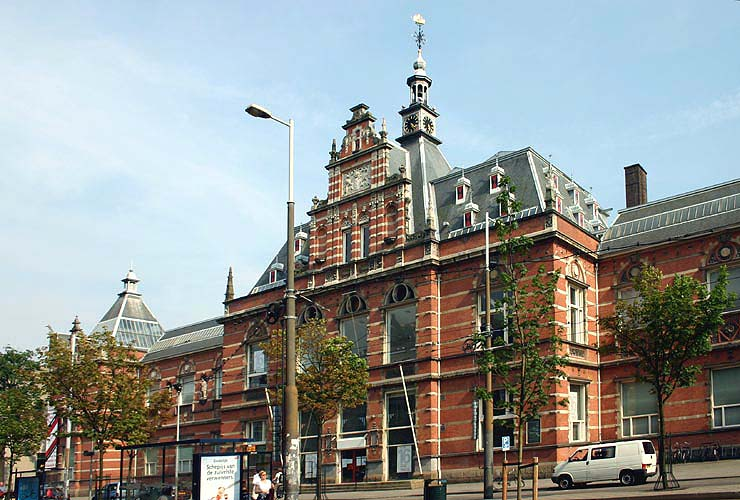
Original front of the Suasso museum she founded, now the back of the Stedelijk Museum

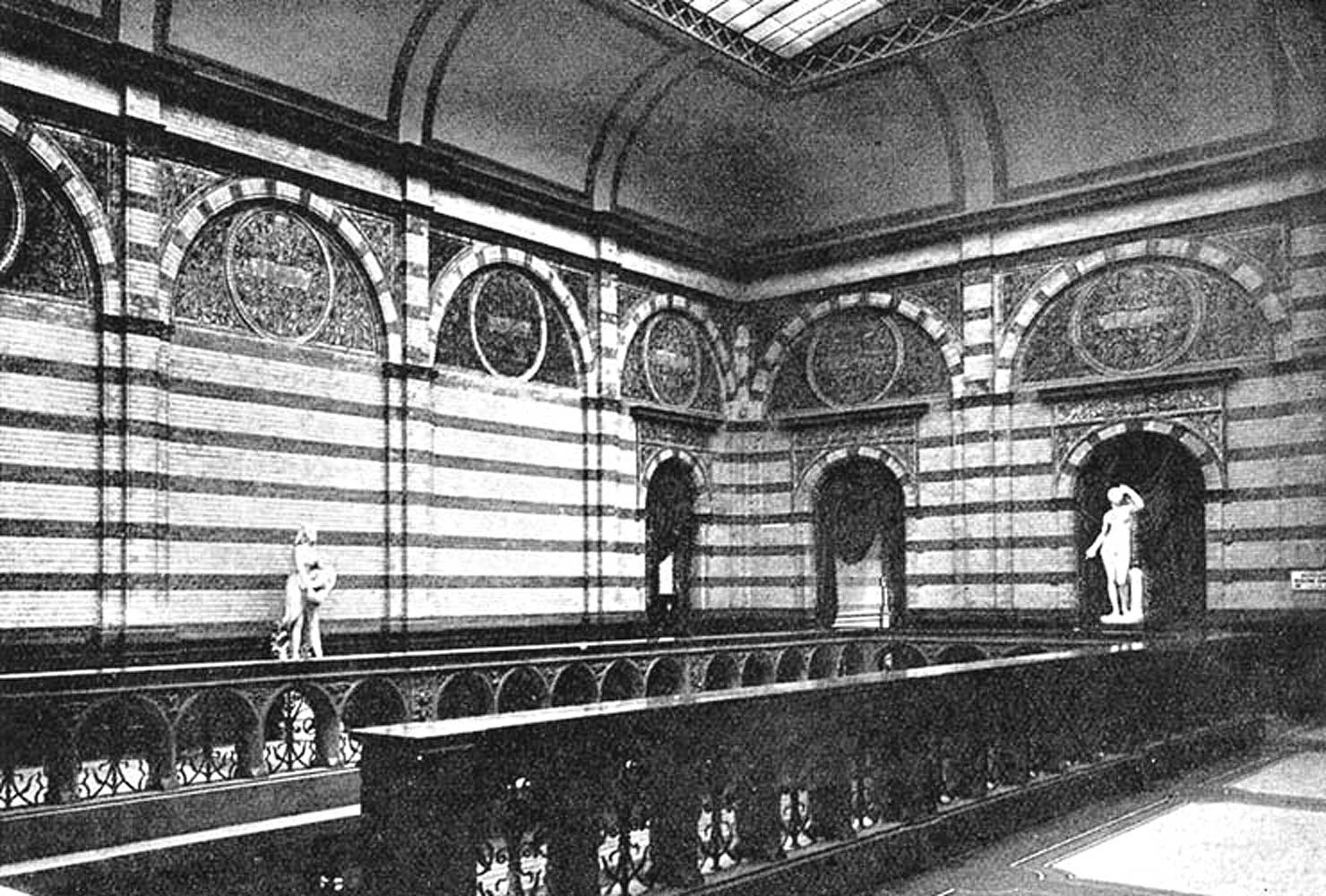
Top of the central staircase in its original state

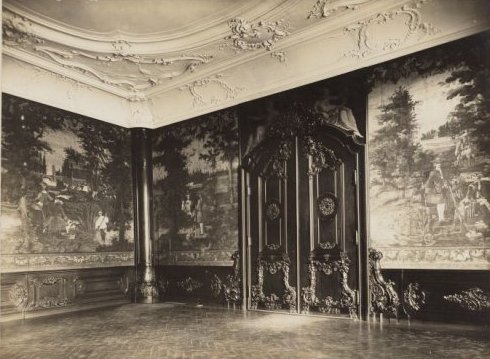
One of the four original reconstructed "period rooms"
