= Portrait of a Woman of the Hofer Family =

Painting by an unknown artist, c.1470

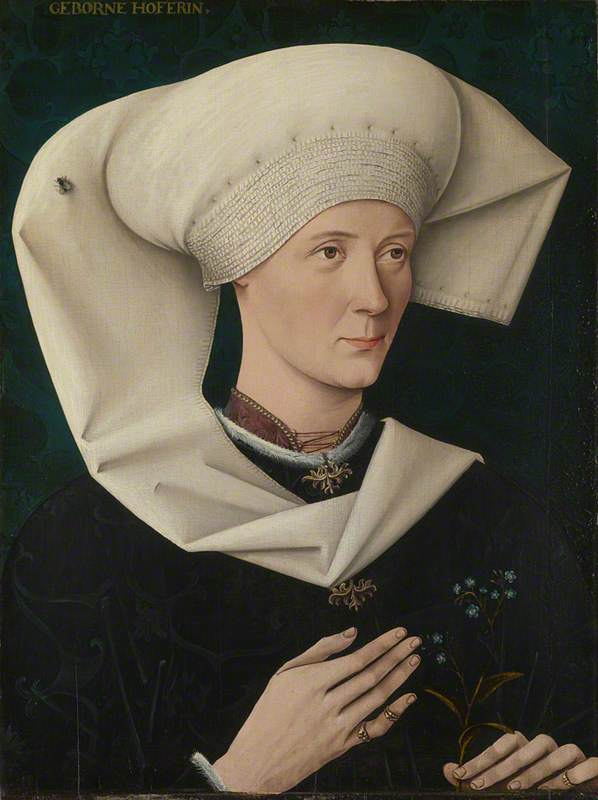
- Artist: Unknown
- Year: c. 1470
- Medium: oil on silver fir
- Dimensions: 53.7 cm × 40.8 cm (21.1 in × 16.1 in)
- Location: National Gallery, London, UK

Portrait of a Woman of the Hofer Family is a painting by an unknown artist, dating to c. 1470, in the collection of the National Gallery, London.

The painting depicts an unknown woman of the Hofer family, holding forget-me-nots in one hand, wearing a black fabric item of clothing and with a “copious white veil”, upon which sits a black fly. The painting is a memento mori, and the addition of the fly “is a proof of the anonymous artist's gifts too: a guarantee of the realism and fidelity of the portrait.” The presence of the forget-me-nots suggests the painting may have been used to commemorate an engagement, as the flowers typically symbolized marriage, but could also symbolize remembrance, "perhaps to the immortality of the person portrayed." The presence of the fly on her head is said to represent the "impermanence" of life, reminding the viewer "that we’re supposed to do the best we can with the time we’ve got".

The history of the painting is not known before coming into the collection of the National Gallery; it was purchased by the Prince Consort who gifted it to Queen Victoria in 1863. Victoria then gifted it to the nation, and it is now held in the Gallery.
