= Mark Bruyns =

South African cricketer (born 1973)

Mark Lloyd Bruyns (born 8 November 1973, in Pietermaritzburg) is a former South African first class cricketer for Natal, Border and the Warriors. A right-handed batsman, he played between 1993–94 and 2005–06. He occasionally kept wicket.
