= Barthel Bruyn the Elder =

German painter

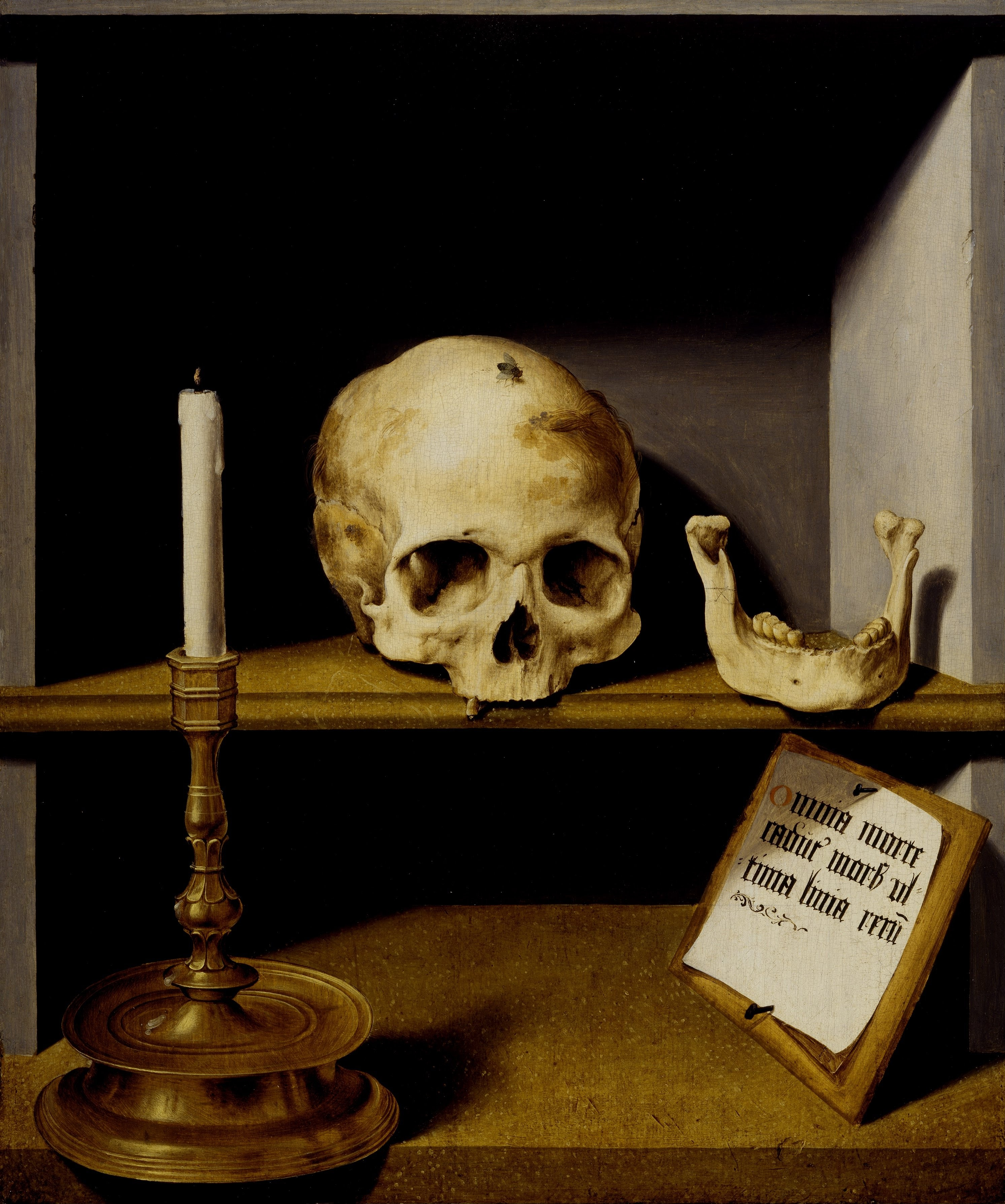
Vanitas still life painting, 1524, Kröller-Müller Museum. Contains a Musca depicta (a fly painted as though it's sitting on the artwork).

Bartholomäus Bruyn (1493–1555), usually called Barthel Bruyn or Barthel Bruyn the Elder, was a German Renaissance painter active in Cologne. He painted altarpieces and portraits, and was Cologne's foremost portrait painter of his day.

== Life ==
He was born in Wesel or Cologne. His early works suggest that he received his artistic training in the Lower Rhine. His earliest documented altarpiece is a Coronation of the Virgin (1515–1516) commissioned by Dr. Peter von Clapis, a professor at the University of Cologne. Bruyn’s altarpieces of the 1510s and 1520s are influenced by the style of Jan Joest, to whom Bruyn was related, and often emulate Joest’s habit of illuminating his figures from below.

By the time Bruyn painted the Essen altarpiece (1522–1525), he had combined Joest's influence with that of Joos van Cleve. In the 1530s, he developed a more Italianate style that reflects the examples of Raphael and Michelangelo, which he probably knew only at second hand through the engravings of Marcantonio Raimondi and as filtered through the works of such artists as Jan van Scorel and Martin van Heemskerck.

Bruyn is especially known for his portraits. He was the first important portrait painter in Cologne, and the founder of a prolific school of portraiture that was continued by his sons Arnt and Barthel Bruyn the Younger. His subjects are usually portrayed at half-length against a flat background; the face is the center of attention, but costume details are crisply described, and prominence is given to the hands. Art historian Jean M. Caswell says Bruyn's depictions of the upper-middle-class citizens of Cologne are "lively and expressive, and they show no vain flattery". Bruyn did not sign his portraits, and some of them have in the past been misattributed to Hans Holbein, whose influence is apparent in Bruyn's works after 1539.

Barthel Bruyn was a respected citizen of Cologne and active throughout his life in civic affairs. He was elected to the City Council in 1549 and 1553, and died a wealthy man. His works are in numerous public collections, including the National Gallery, London; the Metropolitan Museum of Art in New York; and the Louvre in Paris. The Thyssen-Bornemisza Museum in Madrid owns a Nativity and two portraits by Bruyn.

== Gallery ==
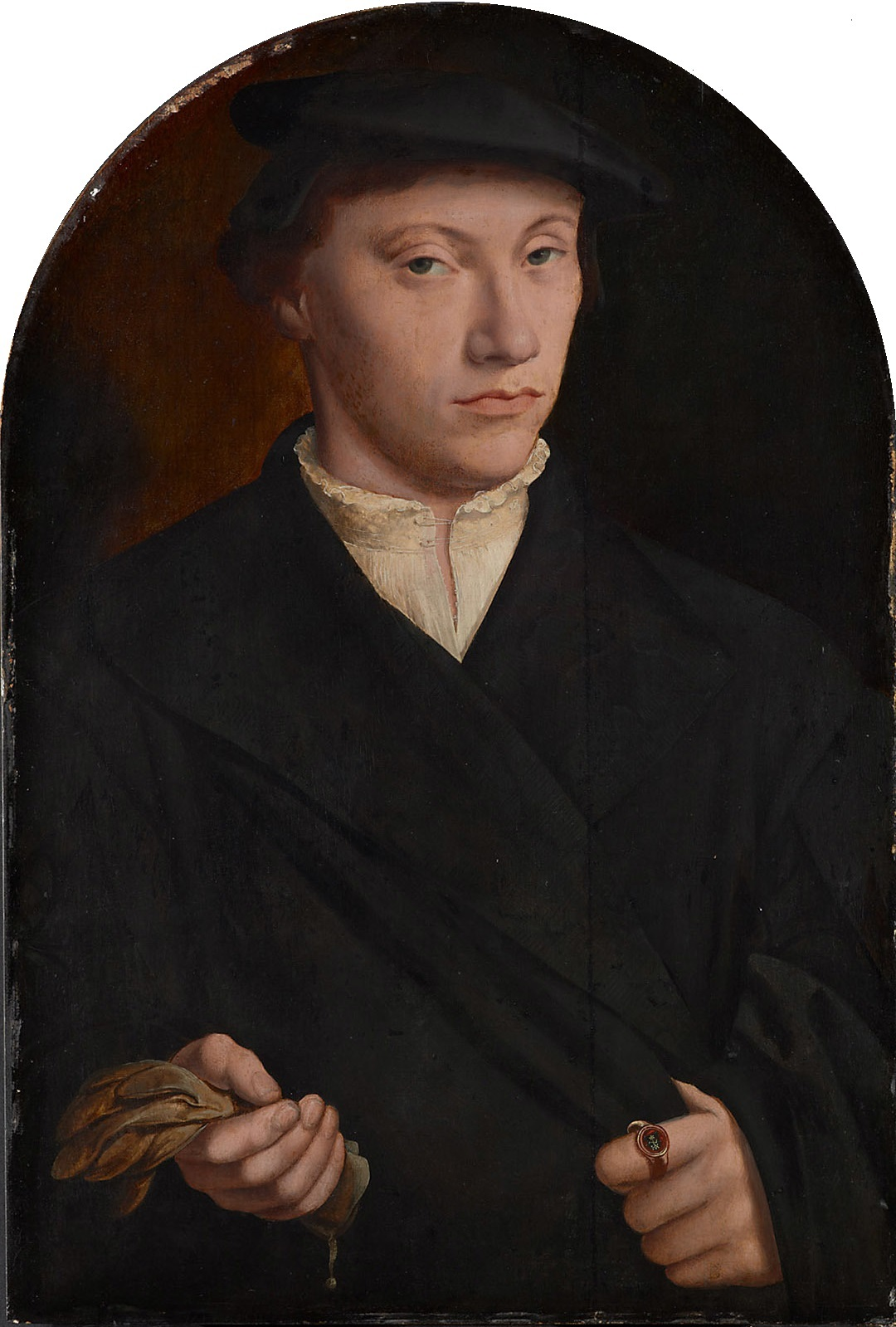
Portrait of a Young Man with Gloves, oil on wood, Kunsthistorisches Museum, Vienna

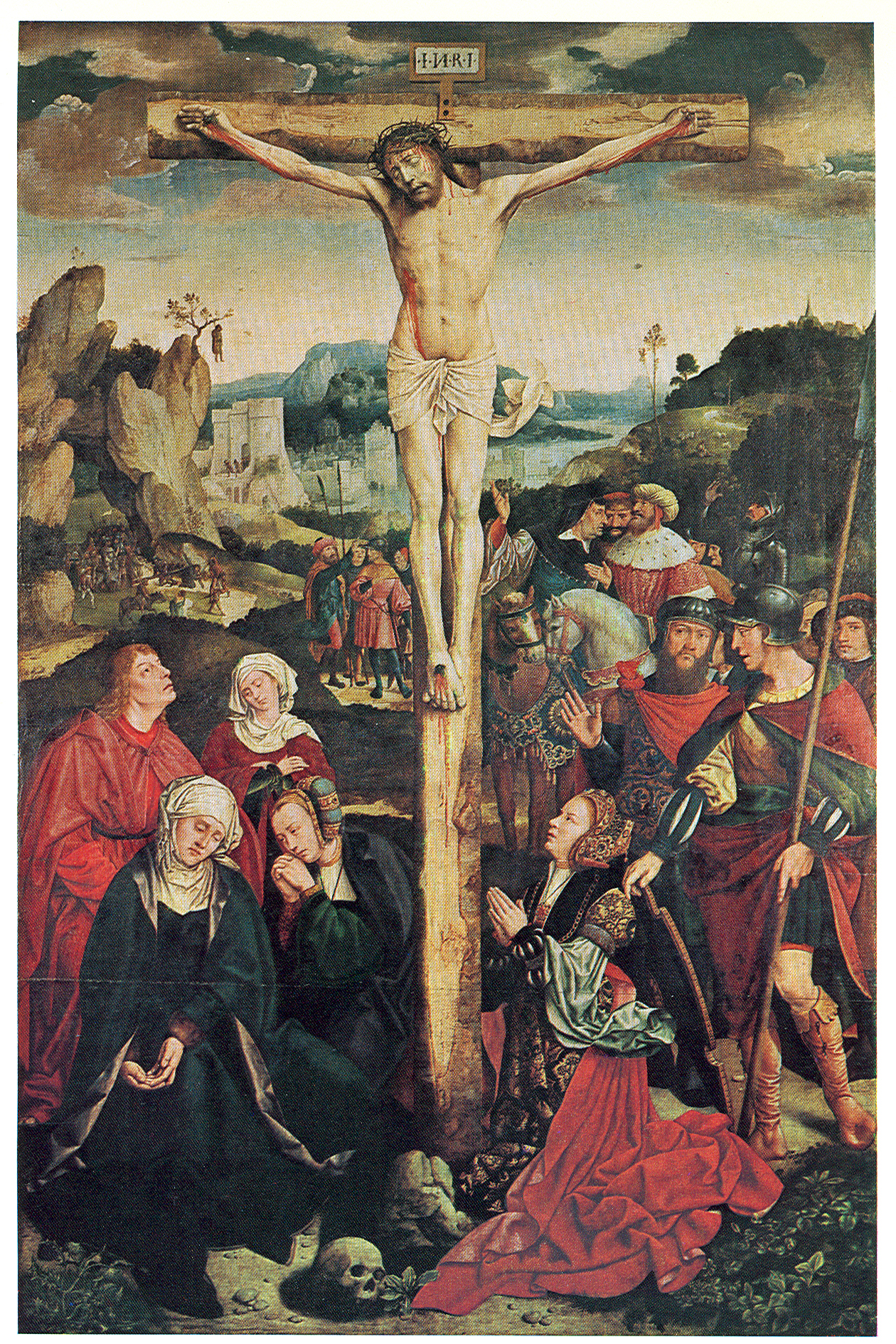
Altarpiece, Church of St. John the Baptist, Essen

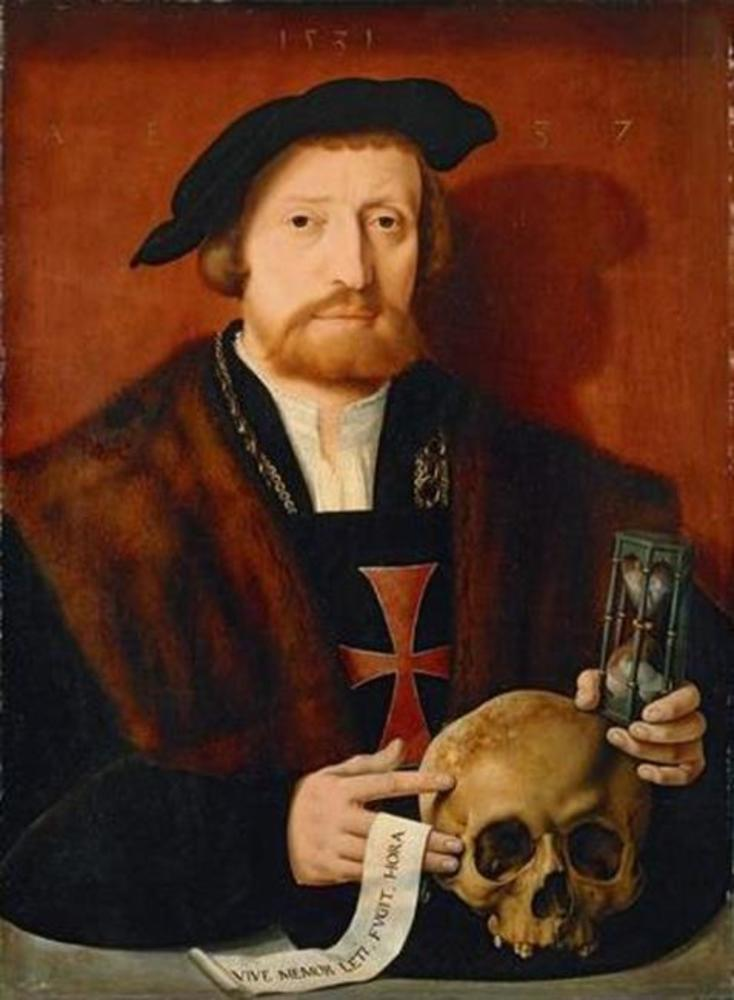
Portrait of a Knight, 1531, oil on wood, Kunsthistorisches Museum, Vienna

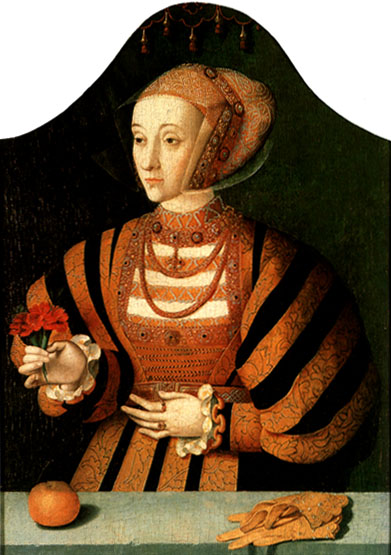
Anne of Cleves, ca. 1540s

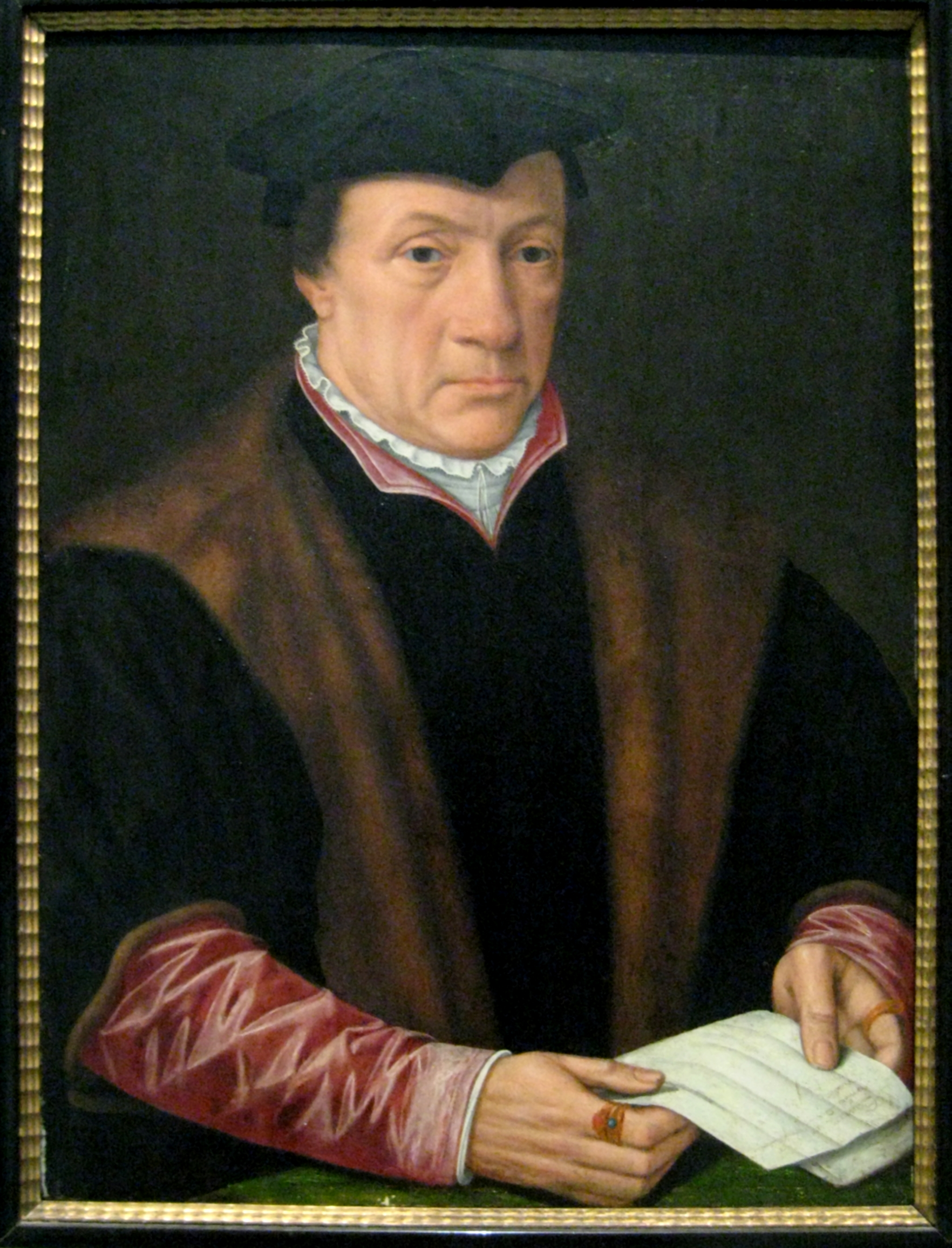
Portrait of an academic, Mikhail Perchenko collection

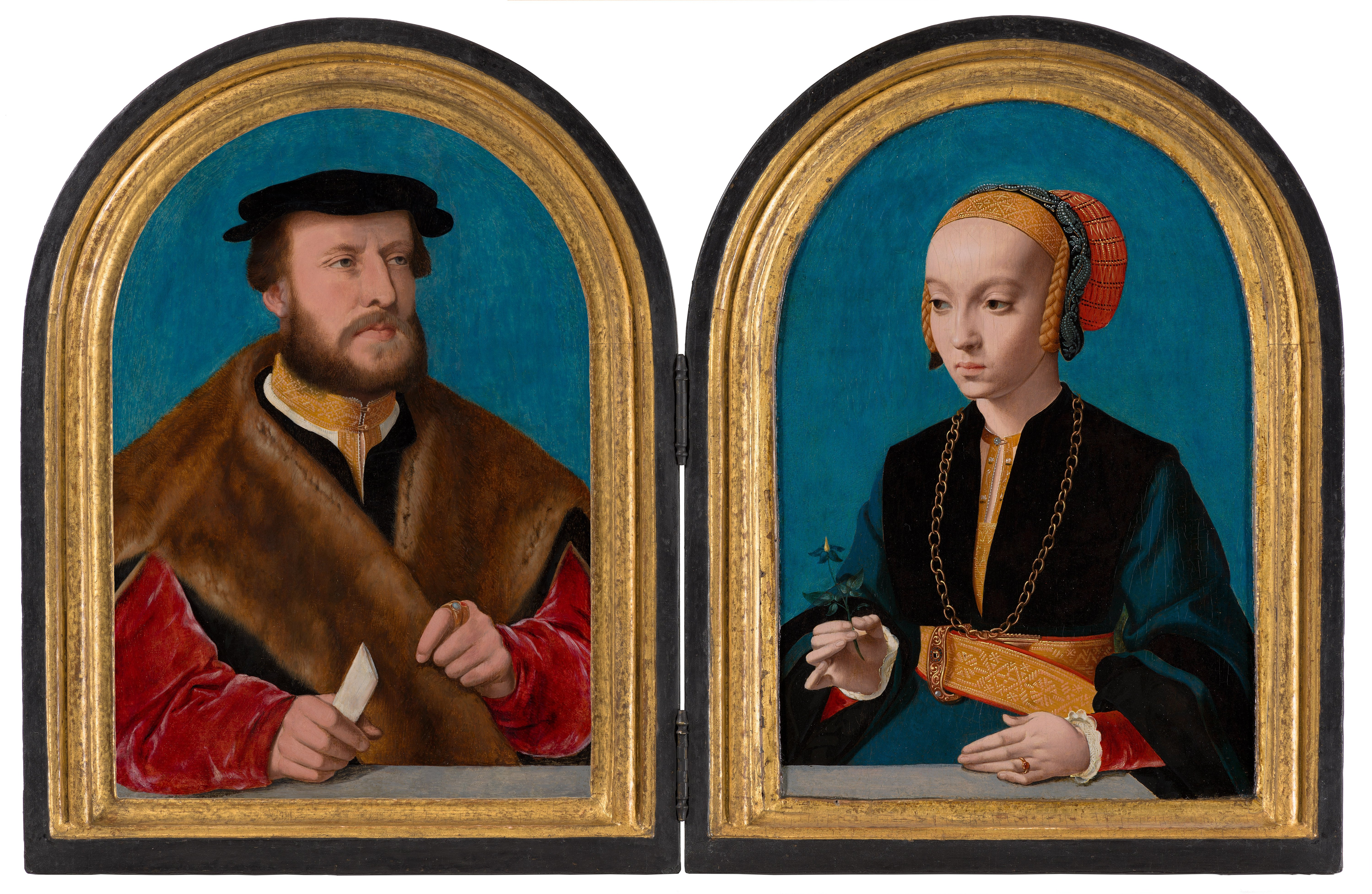
Elisabeth Bellinghausen and Jacob Omphalius, ca. 1538, Mauritshuis, The Hague. Elisabeth is holding a branch of bittersweet, symbol for fiancees.

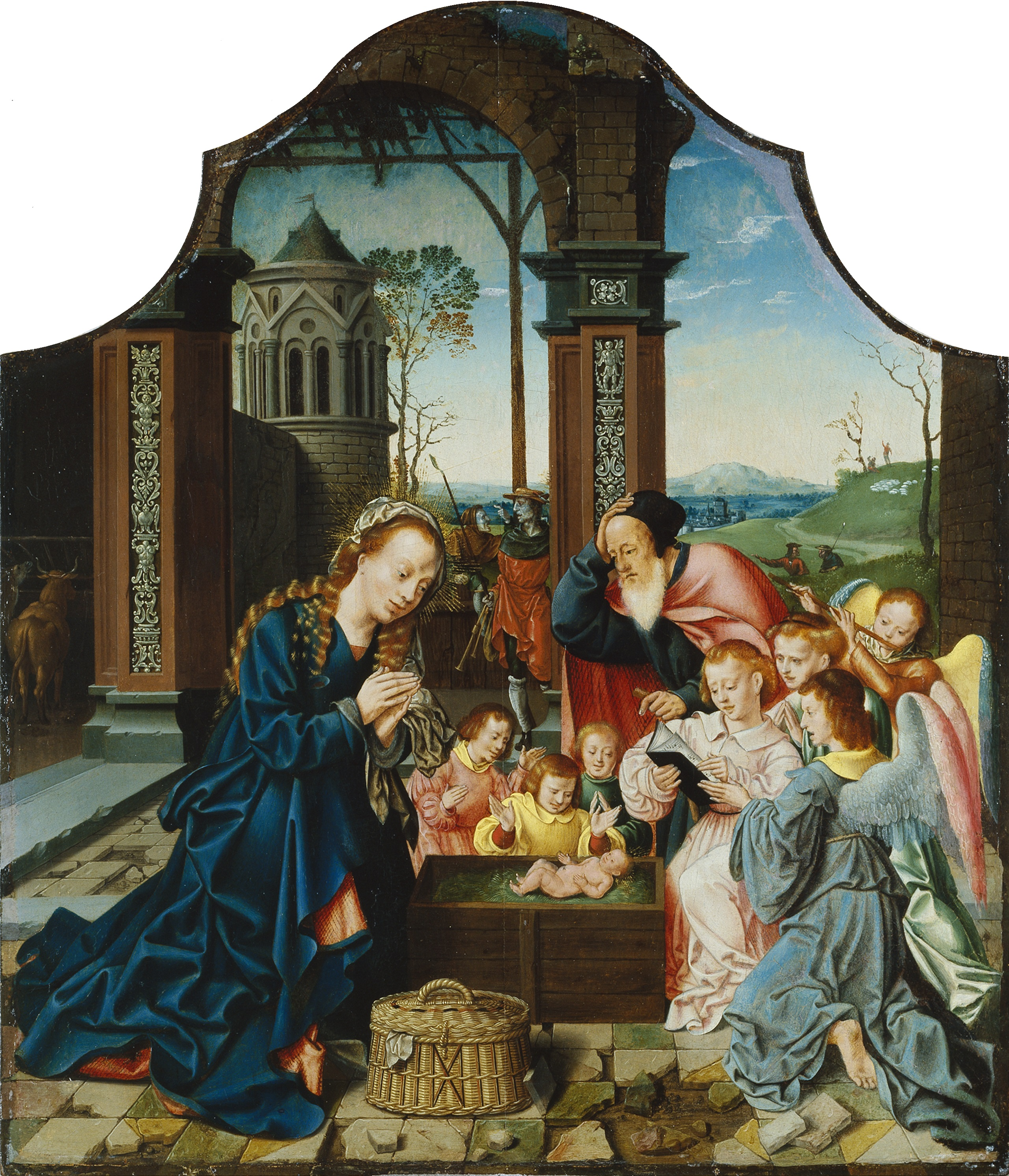
Nativity, ca. 1520, Thyssen-Bornemisza Museum, Madrid

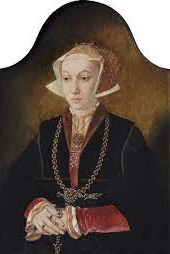
Suggested to be either a portrait of an aged Anne of Cleves or of her sister, Amalia of Cleves

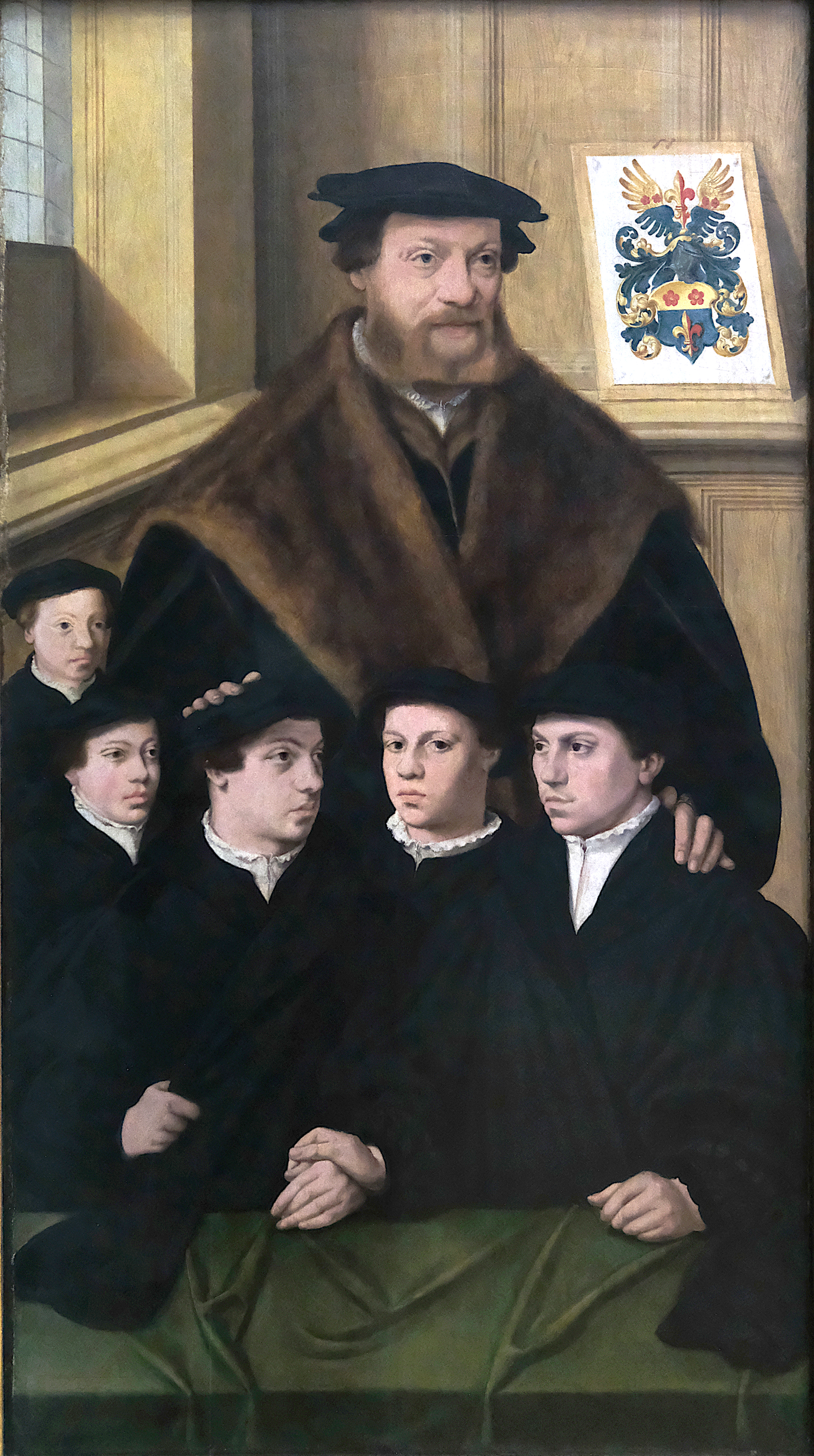
Portrait of Philipp von Gail, merchant from Cologne, and five of his sons, 1536–37, oil on panel (oak), Louvre museum, Paris

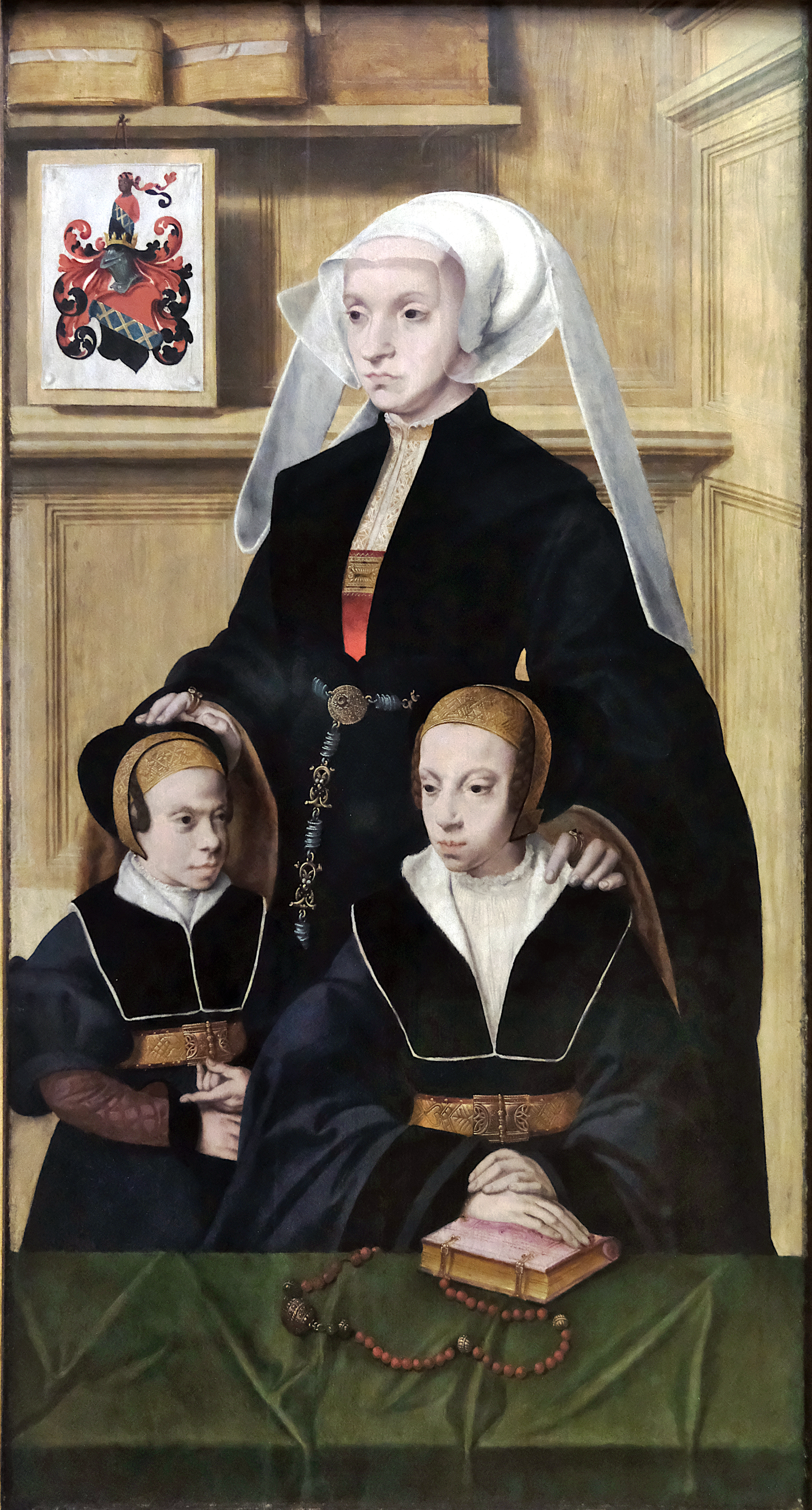
Portrait of Katharina von Gail and her two daughters, 1536–37, oil on panel (oak), Louvre museum, Paris

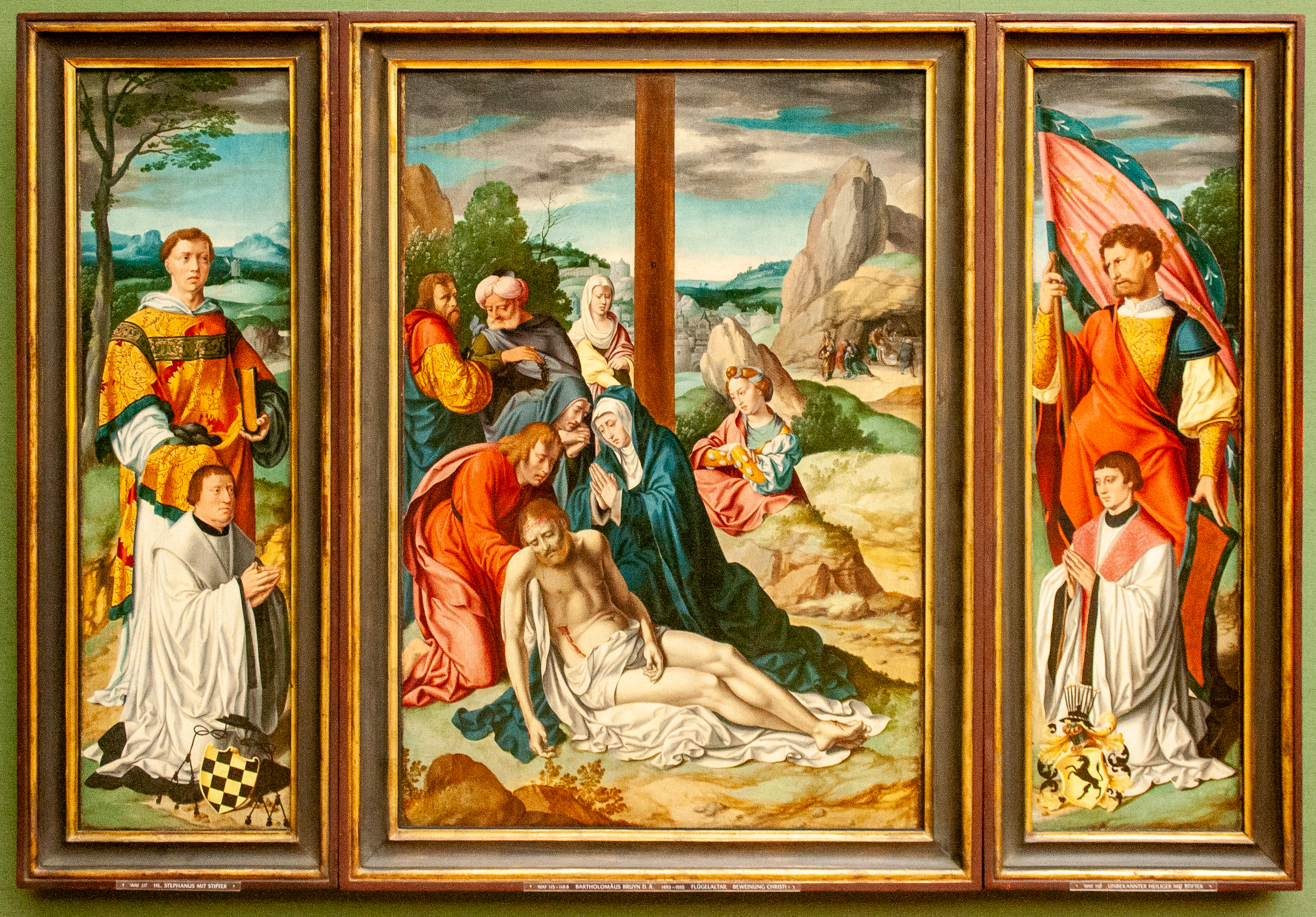
Lamentation of Christ, Alte Pinakothek

== References and sources ==
Sources

- Lübbeke, Isolde. 1991. Early German painting 1350-1550: The Thyssen-Bornemisza Collection. London: Philip Wilson. ISBN 0-85667-376-5
- Murray, Peter, and Linda Murray. 1997. The Penguin dictionary of art and artists. London, England: Penguin Books. ISBN 0-14-051300-0
- Oxford Art Online: "Bartholomäus Bruyn"
