= Pierre de Bruyn =

South African cricketer

Personal information
- Born: 31 March 1977 (age 49); Pretoria, Transvaal Province, South Africa
- Batting: Right-handed
- Bowling: Right-arm fast-medium
- Role: Occasional wicket-keeper
- Relatives: Ettiene de Bruyn (twin-brother)

Domestic team information
- Years: Team
- 1995/96: Northern Transvaal
- 1997/98–2006/07: Northerns
- 1999/00–2004/05: Easterns
- 2003: Norfolk
- 2004/05–2007/08: Titans
- 2008/09–2009/10: Dolphins
- 2008/09–2009/10: KwaZulu-Natal

Career statistics
Competition	FC	LA	T20
Matches	91	108	28
Runs scored	4,637	1,791	286
Batting average	37.09	29.85	26.00
100s/50s	10/23	1/9	0/0
Top score	202	111*	44*
Balls bowled	6,882	2,934	217
Wickets	108	60	12
Bowling average	29.63	38.11	21.25
5 wickets in innings	3	0	0
10 wickets in match	0	0	0
Best bowling	6/38	4/28	4/11
Catches/stumpings	87/–	54/4	12/2
- Source: Cricinfo, 23 August 2011

Pierre de Bruyn (born 31 March 1977) is a South African former cricketer. Having made his debut in first-class cricket in the 1995–96 South African cricket season, de Bruyn proceeded to play first-class, List A and Twenty20 cricket for several teams as an all-rounder and occasional wicket-keeper until his retirement during the 2009–10 South African cricket season. Following his retirement, he moved into coaching. He was appointed the head coach of English county side Leicestershire in 2016, before resigning the following year. In December 2018, he was appointed as the head coach of the Namibia national cricket team.

== Early life and cricket career ==
de Bruyn was born at Pretoria, where he was educated at Zwartkop High School. He made his debut in first-class cricket for Northern Transvaal B against Transvaal B in the 1995–96 UCB Bowl at the Wanderers. He scored his maiden first-class century in 1997, batting alongside his twin-brother Ettiene de Bruyn for Northerns B. They shared a stand of 88 in Northerns first-innings, with de Bruyn making 103. He played solely first-class cricket up to 2000, before making his debut in List A one-day cricket for Easterns against a touring England XI. He played cricket in England in 2003, appearing for Norfolk in a one-day match in the 1st round of the Cheltenham & Gloucester Trophy against Lincolnshire.

He played first-class and one-day cricket for the Titans franchise between 2005 and 2007, as well as making his Twenty20 debut for the franchise against the Lions in the 2004–05 Standard Bank Pro20 Series. He later moved franchises to the Dolphins for the 2007–08 season having been released from his contract with the Titans, moving along with Alfonso Thomas. He played all three formats for the Dolphins until the 2009–10 season, as well as appearing in first-class and one-day cricket for KwaZulu-Natal Inland in the 2008–09 and 2009–10 seasons. He retired from playing during the 2009–10 season, having been released from his contract by the Dolphins before the conclusion of the season.

He played a total of 91 first-class matches, scoring 4,637 runs at an average of 37.09, while with his right-arm fast-medium bowling he took 108 wickets at 29.85 apiece. In one-day cricket he played 108 matches, scoring 1,791 runs at an average of 29.85 and a high score of 111 not out, while with the ball he took 60 wickets at 38.11 apiece. Uniquely in Twenty20 matches, de Bruyn played three roles as a batsman, bowler and wicket-keeper in the same match.

== Coaching career ==
Following his retirement, he moved into coaching, taking up the post of director of cricket at the University of Pretoria. He replaced Andrew McDonald as head coach of Leicestershire in August 2016, having worked with the county as the Second XI and Assistant Skills Coach since the winter of 2015. With Leicestershire bottom of the County Championship in 2017 and with unresolvable dressing room tensions, de Bruyn quit as head coach with immediate effect in September 2017, with Graeme Welch and John Sadler replacing him in the interim.

In December 2018, he was appointed as head coach of the Namibia national cricket team, replacing Dee Thakur. He took up the post in January 2019. His first engagement was the 2019 ICC World Cricket League Division Two tournament in April 2019. Namibia finished 4th in the tournament after a loss to The Netherlands, but it was enough to qualify for their first-ever ICC T20 World Cup and first ICC tournament since the 2003 ICC ODI World Cup.

De Bruyn was head coach of Namibia when they won their first-ever match at an ICC World Cup when they beat The Netherlands by 6 wickets at the 2021 ICC T20 World Cup in Abu Dhabi on 20 October 2021.
