= Michelle de Bruyn =

New Zealand footballer (born 1965)

Personal information
- Full name: Michelle de Bruyn
- Date of birth: 12 August 1965 (age 61)
- Place of birth: New Plymouth, New Zealand

International career
Years	Team	Apps	(Gls)
1984	New Zealand	4	(0)

Michelle de Bruyn (born 15 August 1965) is a former association football player who represented New Zealand at international level.

De Bruyn made her Football Ferns début in a 0–0 draw with Chinese Taipei on 9 December 1984, and finished her international career with four caps to her credit.
