= Michelle de Bruin =

British sculptor

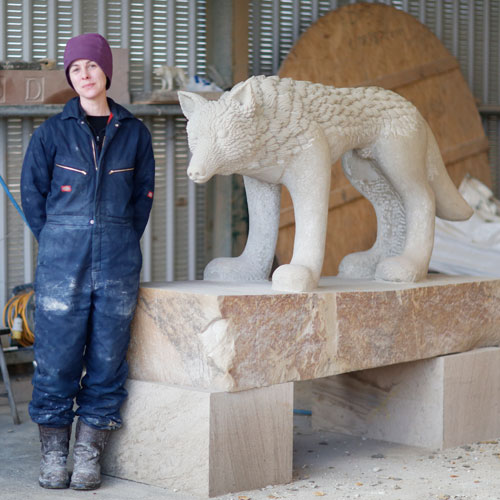
- Michelle de Bruin, with her work in progress: "Wolf"
- Born: 1967 (age 58–59); Wokingham, England
- Education: Lincoln School of Art; Glasgow School of Art
- Known for: Sculpture
- Spouse: Thomas Greenough (1993-present)
- Website: Official website

Michelle de Bruin (born 1967) is a British sculptor and artist, working primarily in stone. She has been based in the Scottish Borders since 1993.

== Biography ==
Michelle de Bruin studied at the Lincoln School of Art, and subsequently at the Glasgow School of Art, graduating from the Sculpture Department of the School of Fine Art in 1990.

== Work ==
Her early public work is featured in Sculpture in Glasgow - An Illustrated Handbook, Public Sculpture of Glasgow (Public Sculpture of Britain) and in the website "Glasgow- City of Sculpture".

She began her professional life working in the realm of public art, but became disillusioned with this, and struck out on her own. Her personal work centres around misinformation, and to this end she has created a "Broom Cupboard" of taxonomic misfits from the animal world.

"The particular focus of my work is in indeterminacy (from a philosophical and semiotic point of view) and areas where material evidence, language and narrative become confused or contradictory."

== Awards ==
de Bruin has been the recipient of the JD Fergusson award, which allowed her to travel to Italy and on to Washington DC work with the paleobiologists in the Smithsonian, where she began work on recreating some of the creatures from the Burgess Shale in stone. She has also received a Scottish Crafts Council development award to concentrate on building her skill sets, and was the 2013 winner of the Inches Carr Craft Award.

de Bruin has exhibited widely, twice at the Royal Scottish Academy in Edinburgh, Perth and Kinross Art Gallery to the Gymnasium Gallery in Berwick upon Tweed. She has work in private collections, in the permanent collections of the JD Fergusson Trust and Perth Museums and Art Galleries.

In her professional lettercutting and stonecarving capacity, de Bruin has worked on conservation projects across Scotland, such as the Fisherman's Monument in Dunbar, the £33 Million restoration of McEwan Hall in Edinburgh, and once appeared on Time Team where she was commissioned to carve an Anglo-Saxon throne extrapolated from a small found fragment, which is now permanently on display in Bamburgh Castle. Her memorials are to be seen throughout the Scottish Borders and Northern England.
