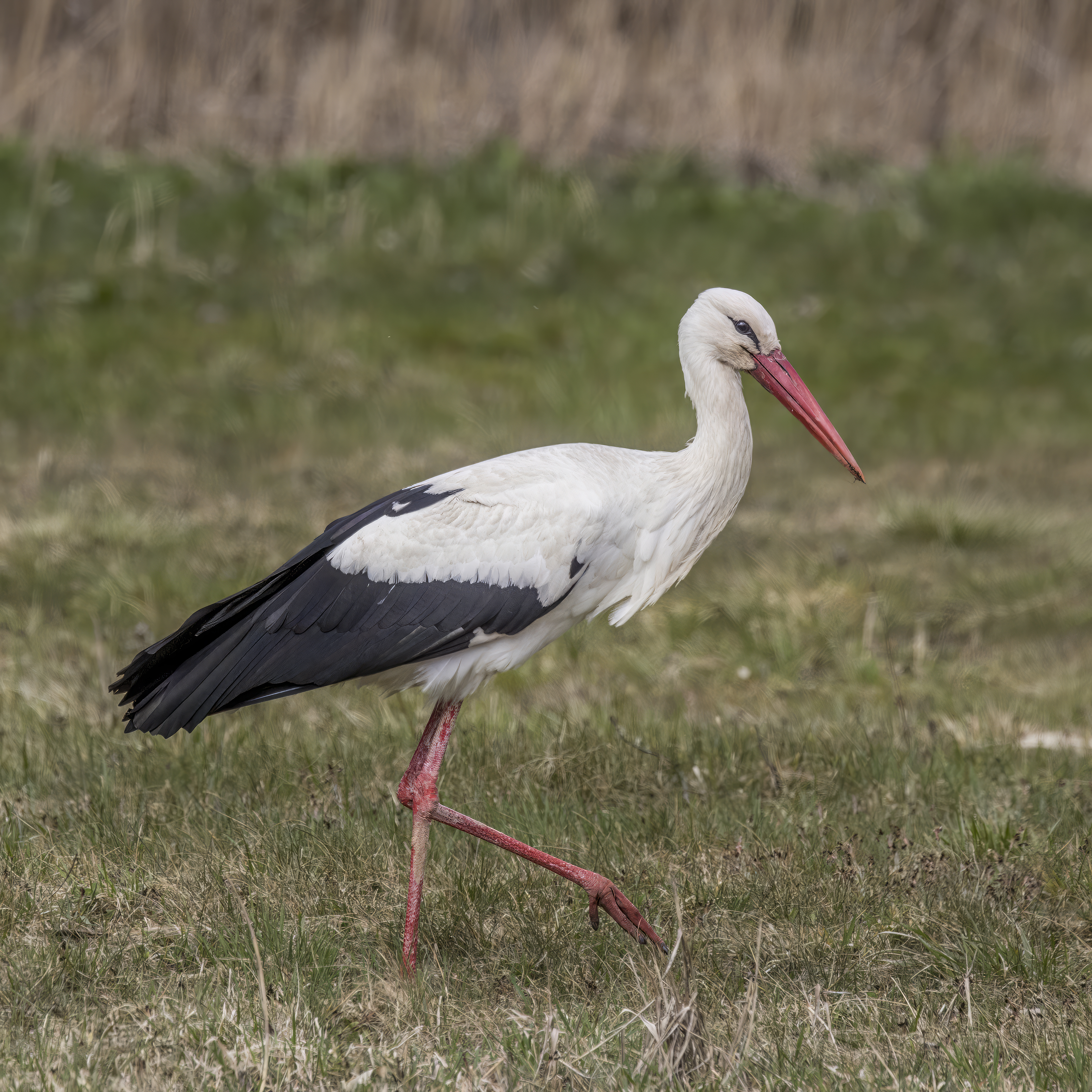
- An adult in Białowieża, Poland

Conservation status
- Least Concern (IUCN 3.1)

Scientific classification
- Kingdom: Animalia
- Phylum: Chordata
- Class: Aves
- Order: Ciconiiformes
- Family: Ciconiidae
- Genus: Ciconia
- Species: C. ciconia

Binomial name
- Ciconia ciconia (Linnaeus, 1758)
- Approximate ranges and routes Breeding range Winter range Migration routes

Synonyms
- Ardea ciconia Linnaeus, 1758

= White stork =

Species of bird

The white stork (Ciconia ciconia) is a large bird in the stork family, Ciconiidae. Its plumage is mainly white, with black on the bird's wings. Adults have long red legs and long pointed red beaks, and measure on average 100–115 cm (39–45 in) from beak tip to end of tail, with a 155–215 cm (61–85 in) wingspan. The two subspecies, which differ slightly in size, breed in Europe north to Finland, northwestern Africa, Palearctic east to southern Kazakhstan and southern Africa. The white stork is a long-distance migrant, wintering in Africa from tropical Sub-Saharan Africa to as far south as South Africa, or on the Indian subcontinent. When migrating between Europe and Africa, it avoids crossing the Mediterranean Sea and detours via the Levant in the east or the Strait of Gibraltar in the west, because the air thermals on which it depends for soaring do not form over water.

A carnivore, the white stork eats a wide range of animal prey, including insects, fish, amphibians, reptiles, small mammals and small birds. It takes most of its food from the ground, among low vegetation, and from shallow water. It is a monogamous breeder, and both members of the pair build a large stick nest, which may be used for several years. Each year the female can lay one clutch of usually four eggs, which hatch asynchronously 33–34 days after being laid. Both parents take turns incubating the eggs and both feed the young. The young leave the nest 58–64 days after hatching, and continue to be fed by the parents for a further 7–20 days.

The white stork has been rated as least concern by the International Union for Conservation of Nature (IUCN). It benefited from human activities during the Middle Ages as woodland was cleared, but changes in farming methods and industrialisation saw it decline and disappear from parts of Europe in the 19th and early 20th centuries. Conservation and reintroduction programs across Europe have resulted in the white stork resuming breeding in the Netherlands, Belgium, Switzerland, Sweden and the United Kingdom.

It has few natural predators, but may harbour several types of parasite; the plumage is home to chewing lice and feather mites, while the large nests maintain a diverse range of mesostigmatic mites.

This species has given rise to many legends across its range, of which the best-known is the story of babies being brought by storks.

== Taxonomy and evolution ==
English naturalist Francis Willughby wrote about the white stork in the 17th century, having seen a drawing sent to him by Sir Thomas Browne of Norwich. He named it Ciconia alba. They noted they were occasional vagrants to England, blown there by storms. (Note: The universally accepted starting point of modern taxonomy for animals is set at 1758, with the publishing of Linnaeus's 10th edition of Systema Naturae, although scientists had been coining names in the previous century.) It was one of the many bird species originally described by Carl Linnaeus in the 10th edition of Systema Naturae, where it was given the binomial name of Ardea ciconia. It was reclassified to and designated the type species of the new genus Ciconia by Mathurin Jacques Brisson in 1760. Both the genus and specific epithet, cĭcōnia, are the Latin word for "stork".

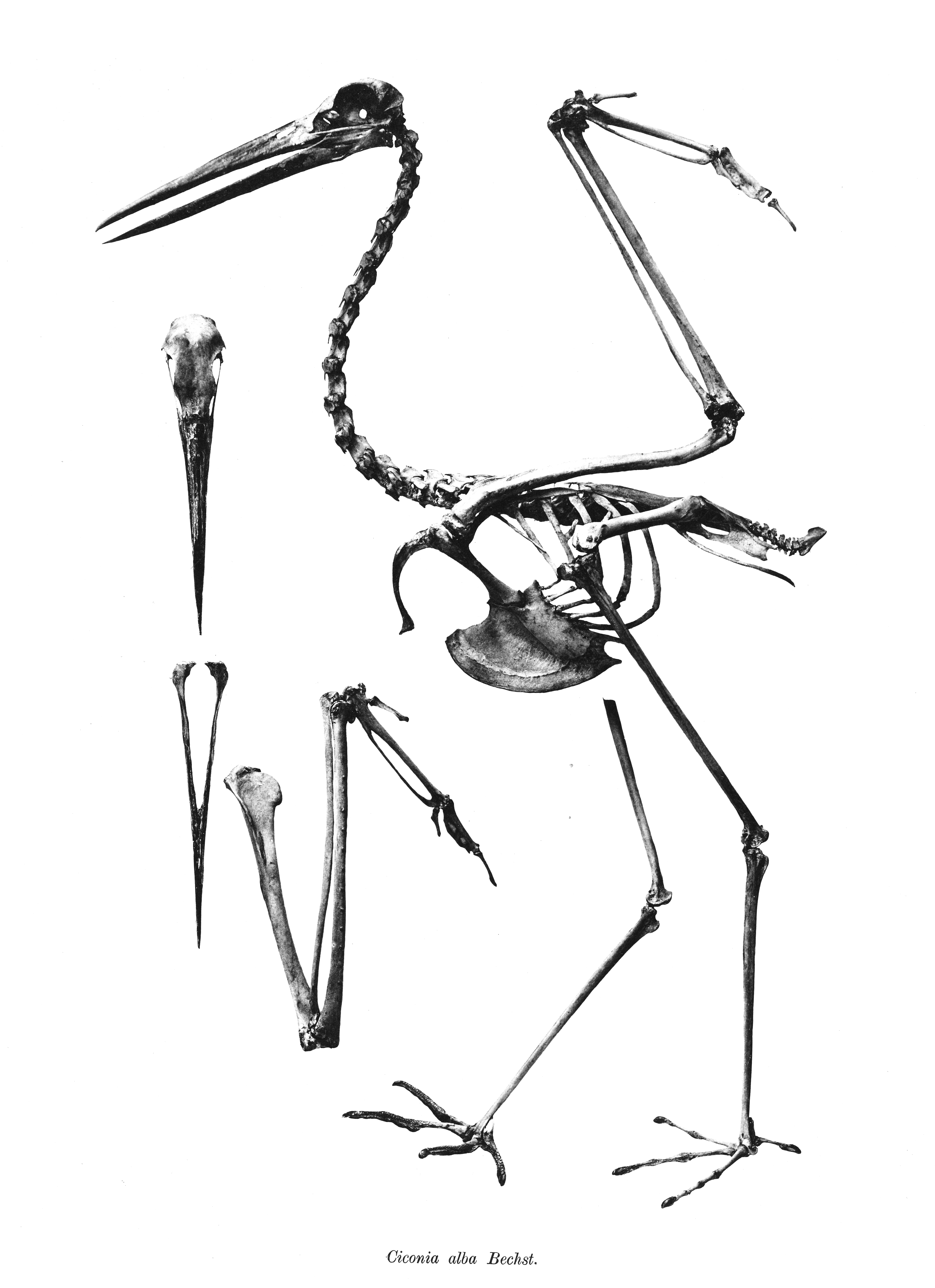
Skeleton

There are two subspecies:

- C. c. ciconia, the nominate subspecies described by Linnaeus in 1758, breeds from Europe to northwestern Africa and westernmost Asia and in southern Africa, and winters mainly in Africa south of the Sahara Desert, though some birds winter in India.
- C. c. asiatica, described by Russian naturalist Nikolai Severtzov in 1873, breeds in Turkestan and winters from Iran to India. It is slightly larger than the nominate subspecies.

The stork family contains six genera in three broad groups; the open-billed and wood storks (Anastomus and Mycteria), the giant storks (Ephippiorhynchus, Jabiru and Leptoptilos), and the "typical" storks (Ciconia). The typical storks include the white stork and six other extant species, which are characterised by straight pointed beaks and mainly black and white plumage. Its closest relatives are the larger, black-billed Oriental stork (Ciconia boyciana) of East Asia, which was formerly classified as a subspecies of the white stork, and the maguari stork (C. maguari) of South America. Close evolutionary relationships within Ciconia are suggested by behavioural similarities and, biochemically, through analysis of both mitochondrial cytochrome b gene sequences and DNA–DNA hybridisation.

A Ciconia fossil representing the distal end of a right humerus has been recovered from Miocene beds of Rusinga Island, Lake Victoria, Kenya. The 24–6 million year old fossil could have originated from either a white stork or a black stork (C. nigra), which are species of about the same size with very similar bone structures. The Middle Miocene beds of Maboko Island have yielded further remains.

== Description ==
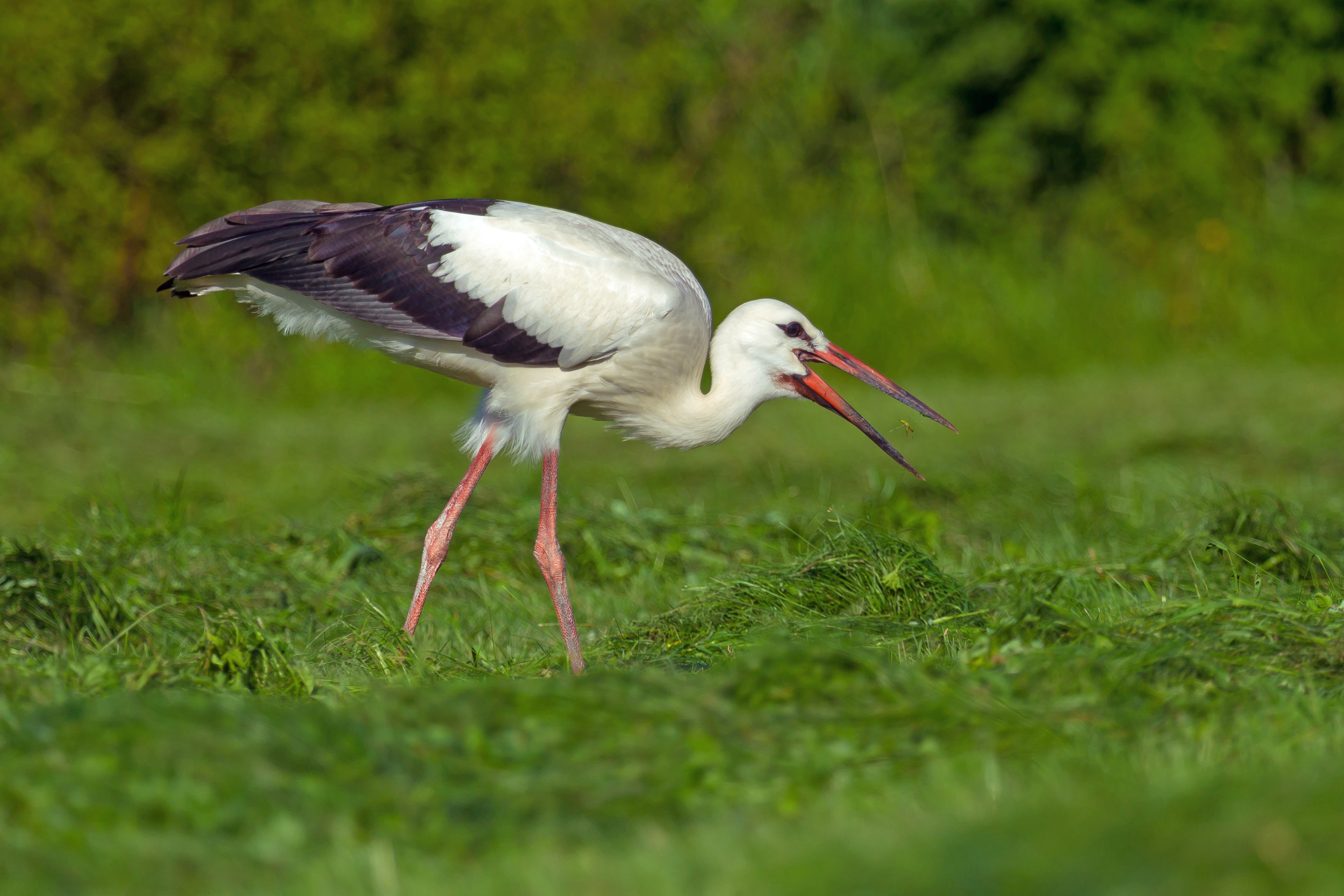
A juvenile feeding on an insect

The white stork is a large bird. It has a length of 100–115 cm (39–45 in), (Note: By convention, length is measured from the tip of the bill to the tip of the tail on a dead bird (or skin) laid on its back.) and a standing height of 100–125 cm (39–49 in). The wingspan is 155–215 cm (61–85 in) and its weight is 2.3–4.5 kg (5.1–9.9 lb). Like all storks, it has long legs, a long neck and a long straight pointed beak. The sexes are identical in appearance, except that males are larger than females on average. The plumage is mainly white with black flight feathers and wing coverts; the black is caused by the pigment melanin. The breast feathers are long and shaggy forming a ruff which is used in some courtship displays. The irises are dull brown or grey, and the peri-orbital skin is black. The adult has a bright red beak and red legs, the colouration of which is derived from carotenoids in the diet. In parts of Spain, studies have shown that the pigment is based on astaxanthin obtained from an introduced species of crayfish (Procambarus clarkii) and the bright red beak colours show up even in nestlings, in contrast to the duller beaks of young white storks elsewhere.

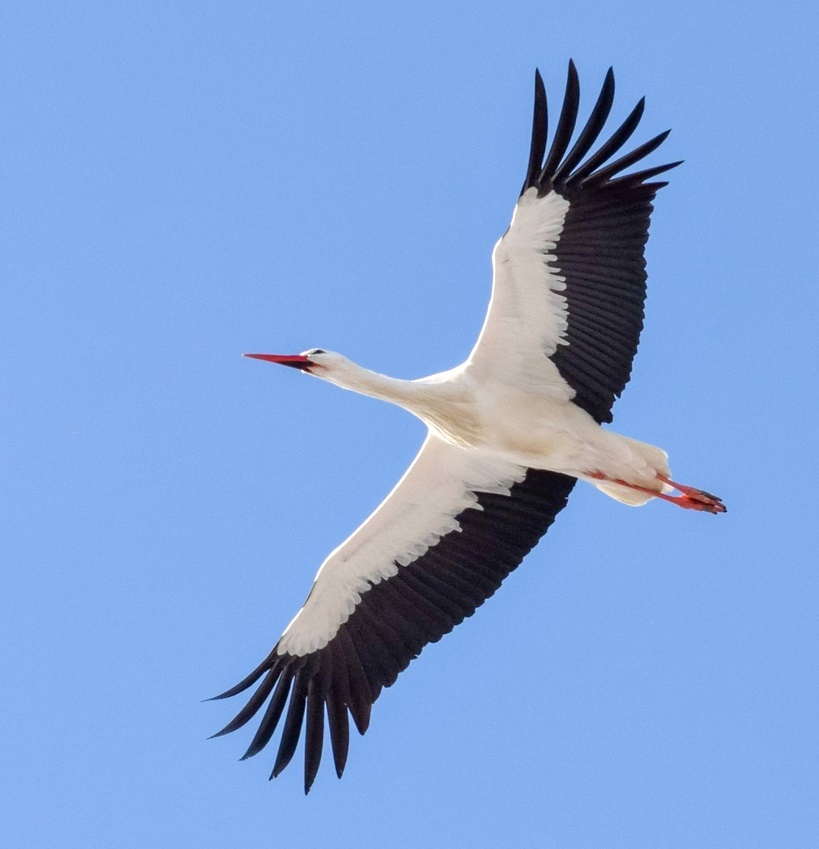
In flight. White storks fly with their necks outstretched.

As with other storks, the wings are long and broad, enabling the bird to soar. In flapping flight its wingbeats are slow and regular. It flies with its neck stretched forward and with its long legs extended well beyond the end of its short tail. It walks at a slow and steady pace with its neck upstretched. In contrast, it often hunches its head between its shoulders when resting. Moulting has not been extensively studied, but appears to take place throughout the year, with the primary flight feathers replaced over the breeding season.

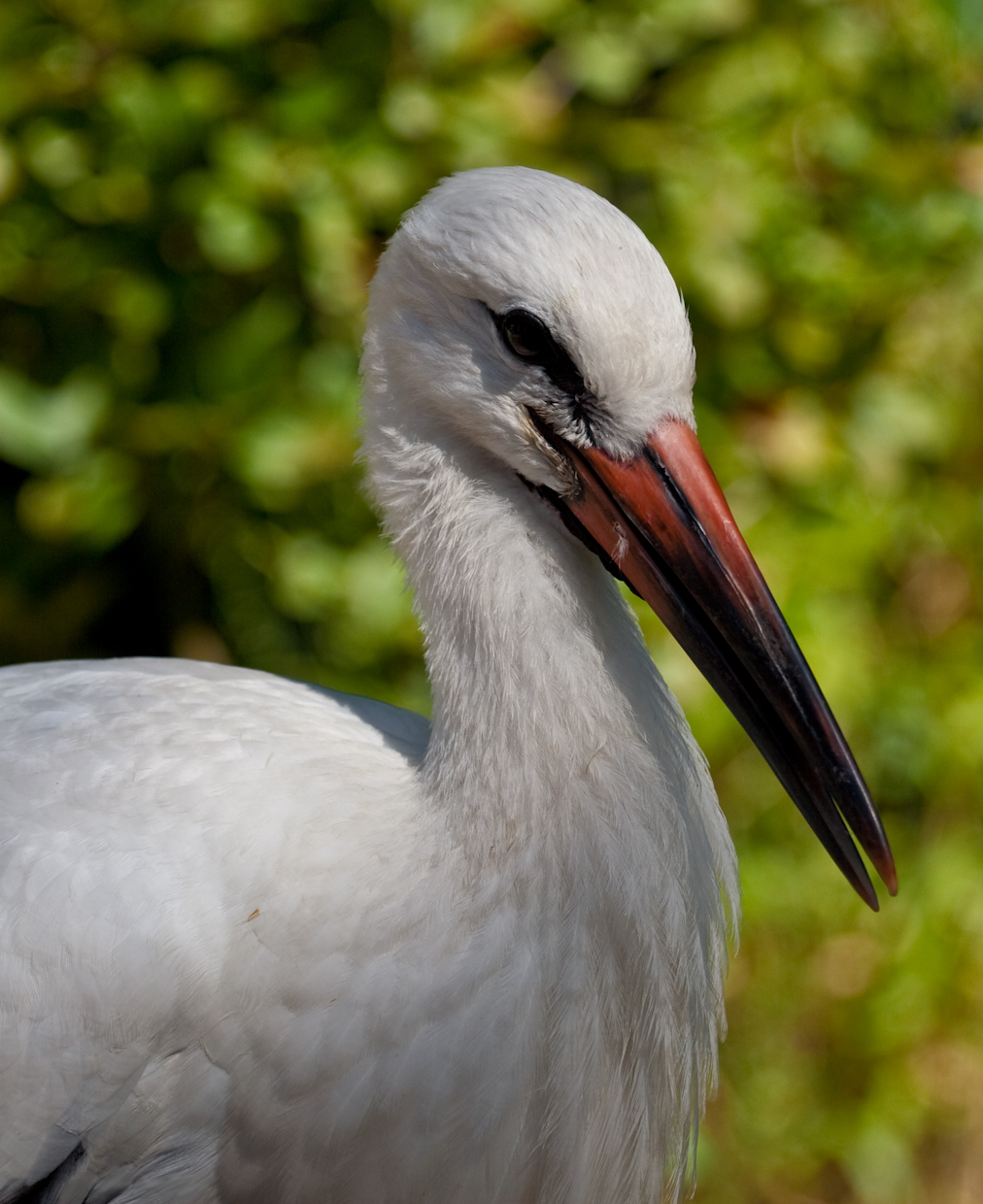
An older juvenile at Vogelpark Avifauna, Netherlands. Beaks turn red starting at the base.

Upon hatching, the young white stork is partly covered with short, sparse, whitish down feathers. This early down is replaced about a week later with a denser coat of woolly white down. By three weeks, the young bird acquires black scapulars and flight feathers. On hatching, the chick has pinkish legs, which turn to greyish-black as it ages. Its beak is black with a brownish tip. By the time it fledges, the juvenile bird's plumage is similar to that of the adult, though its black feathers are often tinged with brown, and its beak and legs are a duller brownish-red or orange. The beak is typically orange or red with a darker tip. The bills gain the adults' red colour the following summer, although the black tips persist in some individuals. Young storks adopt adult plumage by their second summer.

=== Similar species ===
Within its range, the white stork is distinctive when seen on the ground. The winter range of C. c. asiatica overlaps that of the Asian openbill, which has similar plumage but a different bill shape. When seen at a distance in flight, the white stork can be confused with several other species with similar underwing patterns, such as the yellow-billed stork, great white pelican and Egyptian vulture. The yellow-billed stork is identified by its black tail and a longer, slightly curved, yellow beak. The white stork also tends to be larger than the yellow-billed stork. The great white pelican has short legs that do not extend beyond its tail, and it flies with its neck retracted, keeping its head near to its stocky body, giving it a different flight profile. Pelicans also behave differently, soaring in orderly, synchronised flocks rather than in disorganised groups of individuals as the white stork does. The Egyptian vulture is much smaller, with a long wedge-shaped tail, shorter legs and a small yellow-tinged head on a short neck. The common crane, which can also look black and white in strong light, shows longer legs and a longer neck in flight.

== Distribution and habitat ==
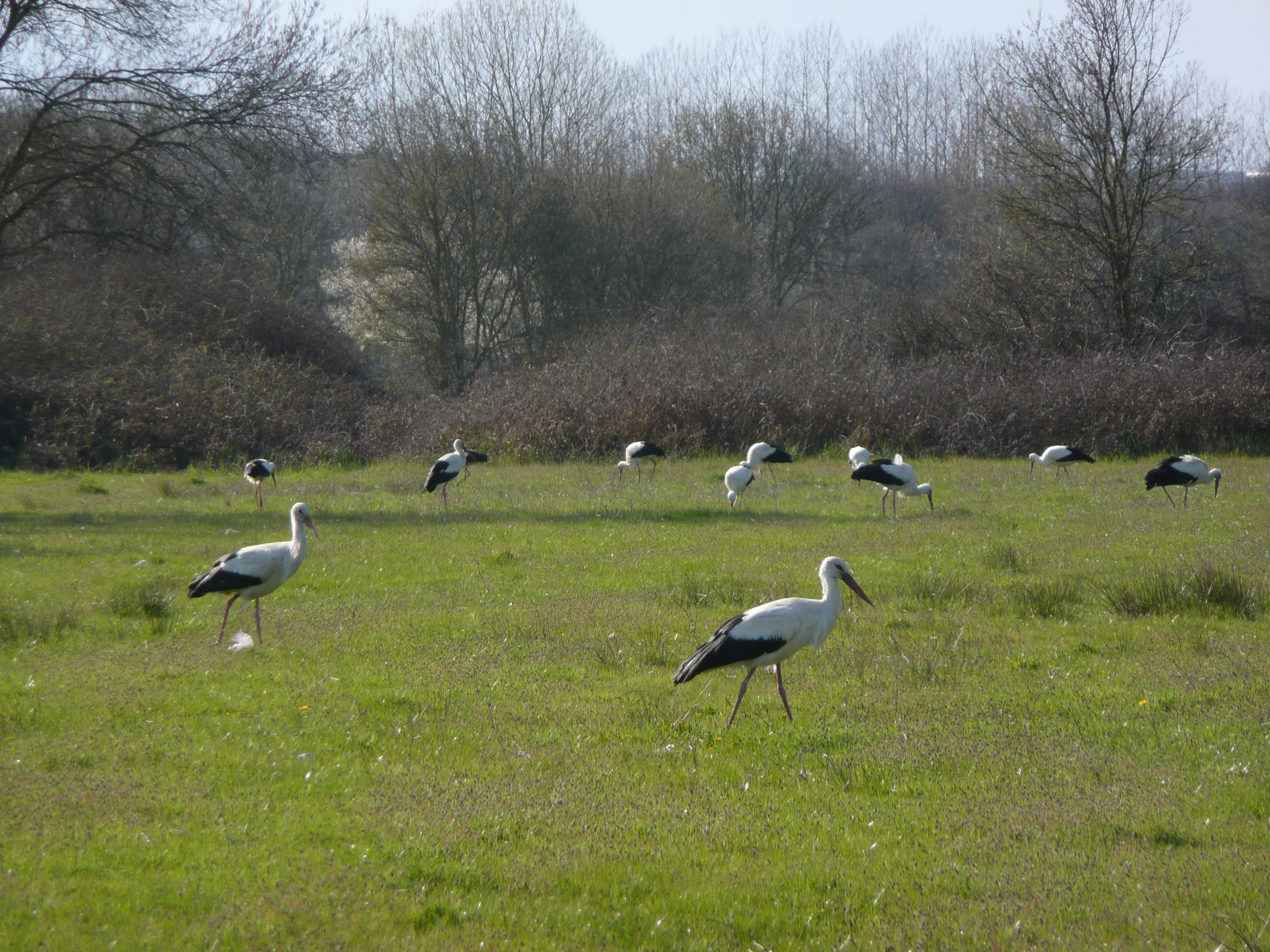
A flock foraging in Turkey. White storks avoid areas overgrown with tall grass and shrubs.

The nominate race of the white stork has a wide although disjunct summer range across Europe, clustered in the Iberian Peninsula and North Africa in the west, and much of eastern and central Europe, with 25% of the world's population concentrated in Poland, as well as parts of western Asia. The asiatica population of about 1450 birds is restricted to a region in central Asia between the Aral Sea and Xinjiang in western China. The Xinjiang population is believed to have become extinct around 1980. Migration routes extend the range of this species into many parts of Africa and India. Some populations adhere to the eastern migration route, which passes across Israel into eastern and central Africa.

In Africa the white stork may spend the winter in Tunisia, Morocco, Uganda, Angola, Zimbabwe, Djibouti, Botswana, Mozambique, Zambia, Eswatini, Gambia, Guinea, Algeria, and Ghana. A few records of breeding from South Africa have been known since 1933 at Calitzdorp, and about 10 birds have been known to breed since the 1990s around Bredasdorp. A small population of white storks winters in India and is thought to derive principally from the C. c. asiatica population as flocks of up to 200 birds have been observed on spring migration in the early 1900s through the Kurram Valley. However, birds ringed in Germany have been recovered in western (Bikaner) and southern (Tirunelveli) India. An atypical specimen with red orbital skin, a feature of the Oriental white stork, has been recorded and further study of the Indian population is required. North of the breeding range, it is a passage migrant or vagrant in Finland, Iceland, Ireland, Norway and Sweden, and west to the Azores and Madeira. Despite their geographical proximity, in Finland the species is rare, while in Estonia there are an estimated 5,000 breeding pairs. In recent years, the range has expanded into western Russia.

The white stork's preferred feeding grounds are grassy meadows, farmland and shallow wetlands. It avoids areas overgrown with tall grass and shrubs. In the Chernobyl area of northern Ukraine, white stork populations declined after the 1986 nuclear accident, as farmland was succeeded by tall grass and shrubs. In parts of Poland, poor natural foraging grounds have forced birds to seek food at rubbish dumps since 1999. White storks have also been reported foraging in rubbish dumps in the Middle East, North Africa and South Africa. Anthropogenic litter was found in the pellets of one third of breeding pairs in Poland, even though all pairs nested far from major dumps and landfills.

The white stork breeds in greater numbers in areas with open grasslands, particularly grassy areas which are wet or periodically flooded, and less in areas with taller vegetation cover such as forest and shrubland. They make use of grasslands, wetlands, and farmland on the wintering grounds in Africa. White storks were probably aided by human activities during the Middle Ages as woodland was cleared and new pastures and farmland were created, and they were found across much of Europe, breeding as far north as Sweden. The population in Sweden is believed to have been established in the 16th century, following the clearing of forests for agricultural purposes. Approximately 5,000 pairs were estimated to breed in the 18th century, but this number subsequently declined. The first accurate census in 1917 found 25 pairs, and the last pair failed to breed around 1955. A similar pattern was seen in Denmark where the white stork appears to have become established in the 15th century when forests were being replaced by farmland and meadows, followed by a rapid population increase in the next centuries and then a rapid decline due mainly to modern, high-intensity agriculture in the last 200 years. The white stork has been a rare visitor to the British Isles, with about 20 birds seen in Britain every year, and prior to 2020 there were no records of nesting since a pair nested atop St Giles High Kirk in Edinburgh, Scotland, in 1416. In 2020, a pair bred in the United Kingdom for the first time in over 600 years, as part of a re-introduction initiative in West Sussex called the White Stork Project.

A decline in population began in the 19th century due to industrialisation and changes in agricultural methods. White storks no longer nest in many countries, and the current strongholds of the western population are in Portugal, Spain, Ukraine and Poland. In the Iberian Peninsula, populations are concentrated in the southwest, and have also declined due to agricultural practices. A study published in 2005 found that the Podhale region in the uplands of southern Poland had seen an influx of white storks, which first bred there in 1931 and have nested at progressively higher altitudes since, reaching 890 m (3000 ft) in 1999. The authors proposed that this was related to climate warming and the influx of other animals and plants to higher altitudes. White storks arriving in Poznań province (Greater Poland Voivodeship) in western Poland in spring to breed did so some 10 days earlier in the last twenty years of the 20th century than at the end of the 19th century.

=== Migration ===
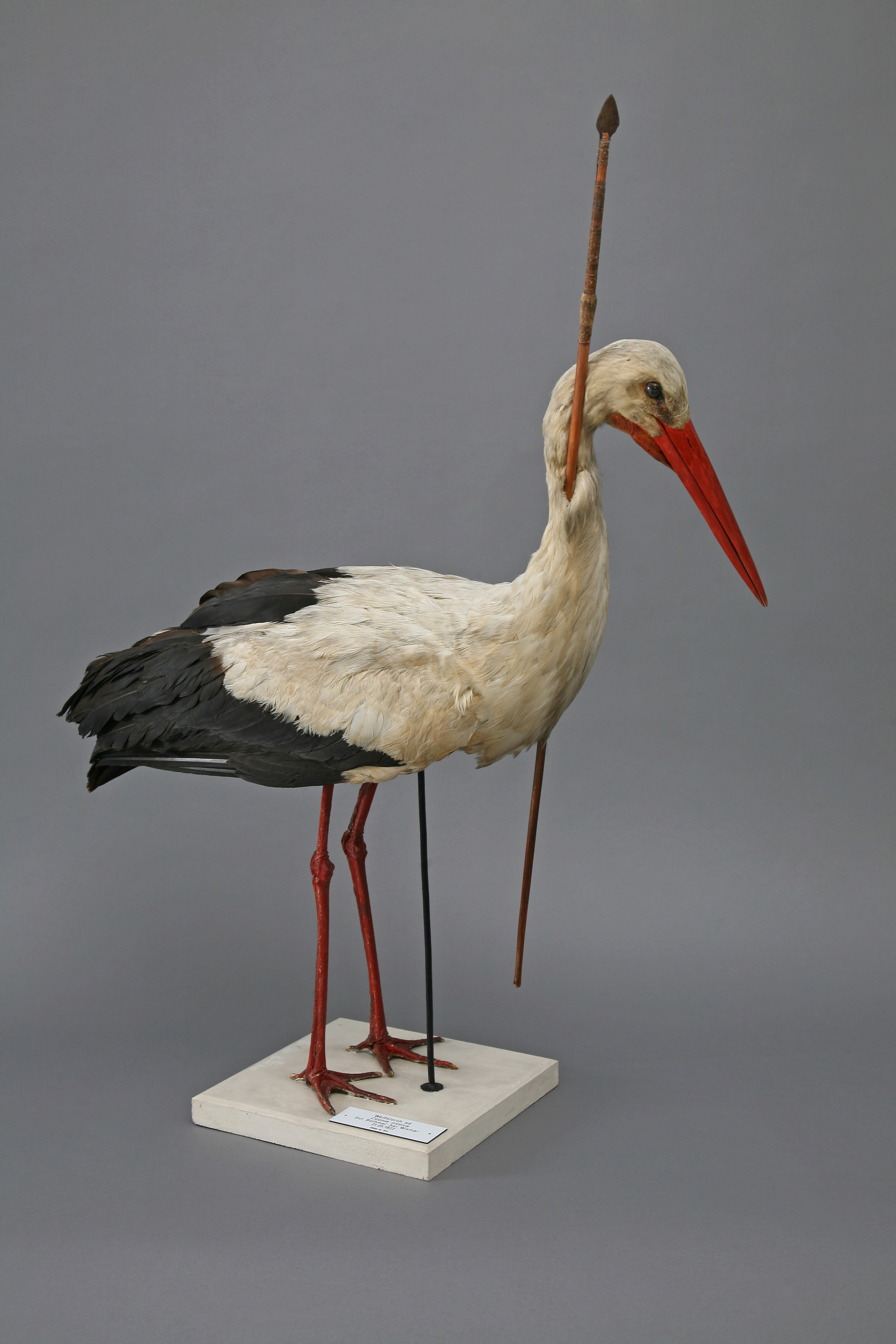
In 1822, the Rostocker Pfeilstorch provided early evidence of long-distance stork migration.

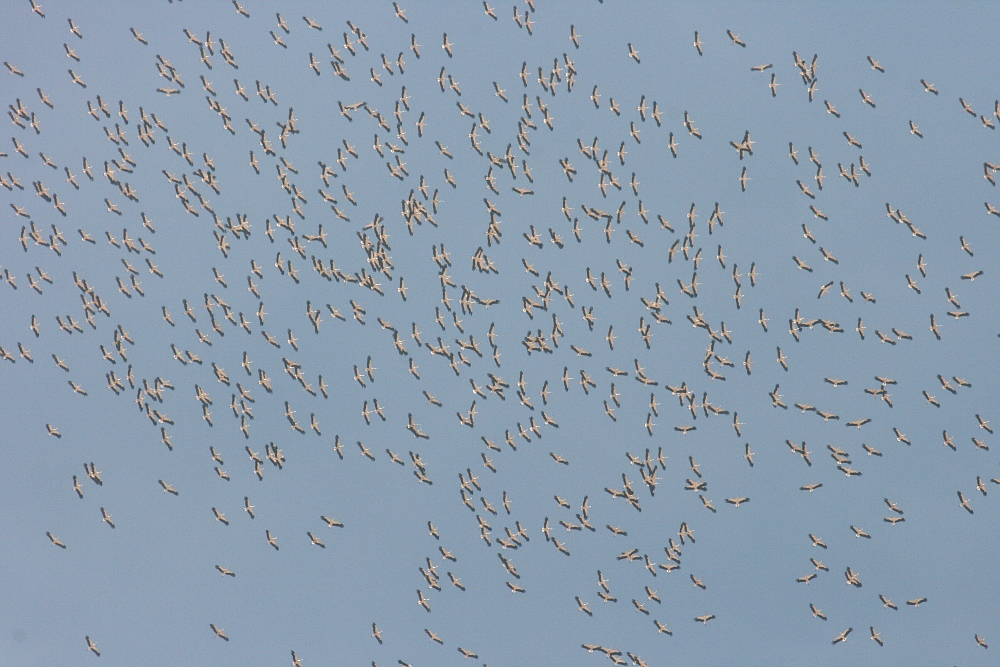
A flock in migration over Israel. Migrating white storks use the uplift of air thermals to reduce the effort of long-distance flying.

Systematic research into migration of the white stork began with German ornithologist Johannes Thienemann who commenced bird ringing studies in 1906 at the Rossitten Bird Observatory, on the Curonian Spit in what was then East Prussia. Although not many storks passed through Rossitten itself, the observatory coordinated the large-scale ringing of the species throughout Germany and elsewhere in Europe. Between 1906 and the Second World War, about 100,000, mainly juvenile, white storks were ringed, with over 2,000 long-distance recoveries of birds wearing Rossitten rings reported between 1908 and 1954.

==== Routes ====
White storks fly south from their summer breeding grounds in Europe in August and September, heading for Africa. There, they spend the winter in savannah from Kenya and Uganda south to the Cape Province of South Africa. In these areas, they congregate in large flocks which may exceed a thousand individuals. Some diverge westwards into western Sudan and Chad, and may reach Nigeria. In spring, the birds return north; they are recorded from Sudan and Egypt from February to April. They arrive back in Europe around late March and April, after an average journey of 49 days. By comparison, the autumn journey is completed in about 26 days. Tailwinds and scarcity of food and water en route (birds fly faster over regions lacking resources) increase average speed.

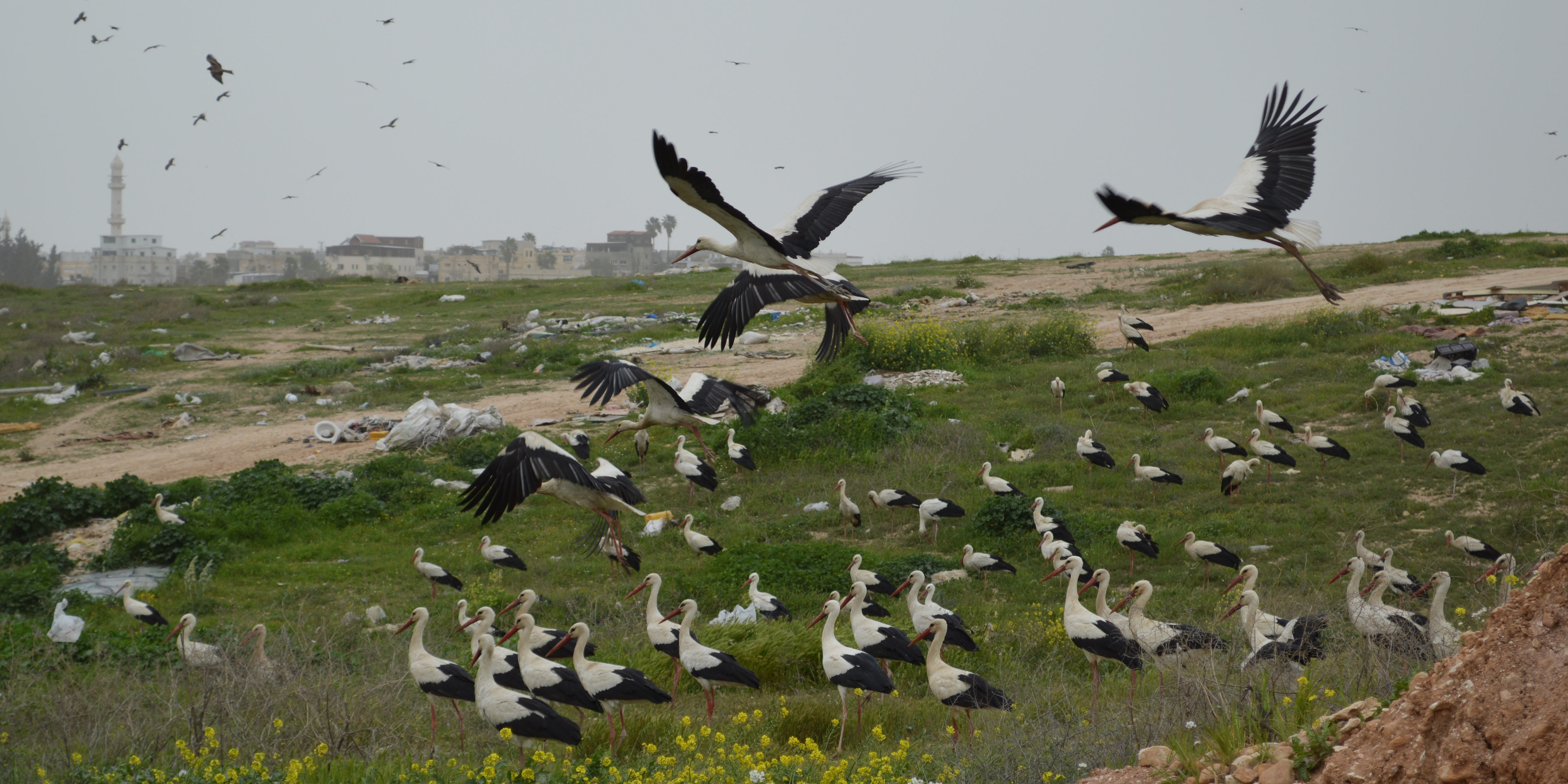
Eastern route: storks resting in Rahat (spring 2017)

To avoid a long sea crossing over the Mediterranean, birds from central Europe either follow an eastern migration route by crossing the Bosphorus in Turkey, traversing the Levant, then bypassing the Sahara Desert by following the Nile valley southwards, or follow a western route over the Strait of Gibraltar. These migration corridors maximise help from the thermals and thus save energy. In winter 2013–2014, white storks were observed in southern India's Mudumalai National Park for the first time. The eastern route is by far the more important, with 530,000 white storks using it annually, making the species the second most common migrant there (after the European honey buzzard). The flocks of migrating raptors, white storks and great white pelicans can stretch for 200 km (125 mi). The eastern route is twice as long as the western, but storks take the same time to reach the wintering grounds by either.

Juvenile white storks set off on their first southward migration in an inherited direction, but if displaced from that bearing by weather conditions, they are unable to compensate and may end up in a new wintering location. Adults can compensate for strong winds and adjust their direction to reach their normal winter sites because they are familiar with the location. For the same reason, all spring migrants, even those from displaced wintering locations, can find their way back to the traditional breeding sites. An experiment with young birds raised in captivity in Kaliningrad and released in the absence of wild storks to show them the way revealed that they appeared to have an instinct to fly south, although the scatter in direction was large.

==== Energetics ====
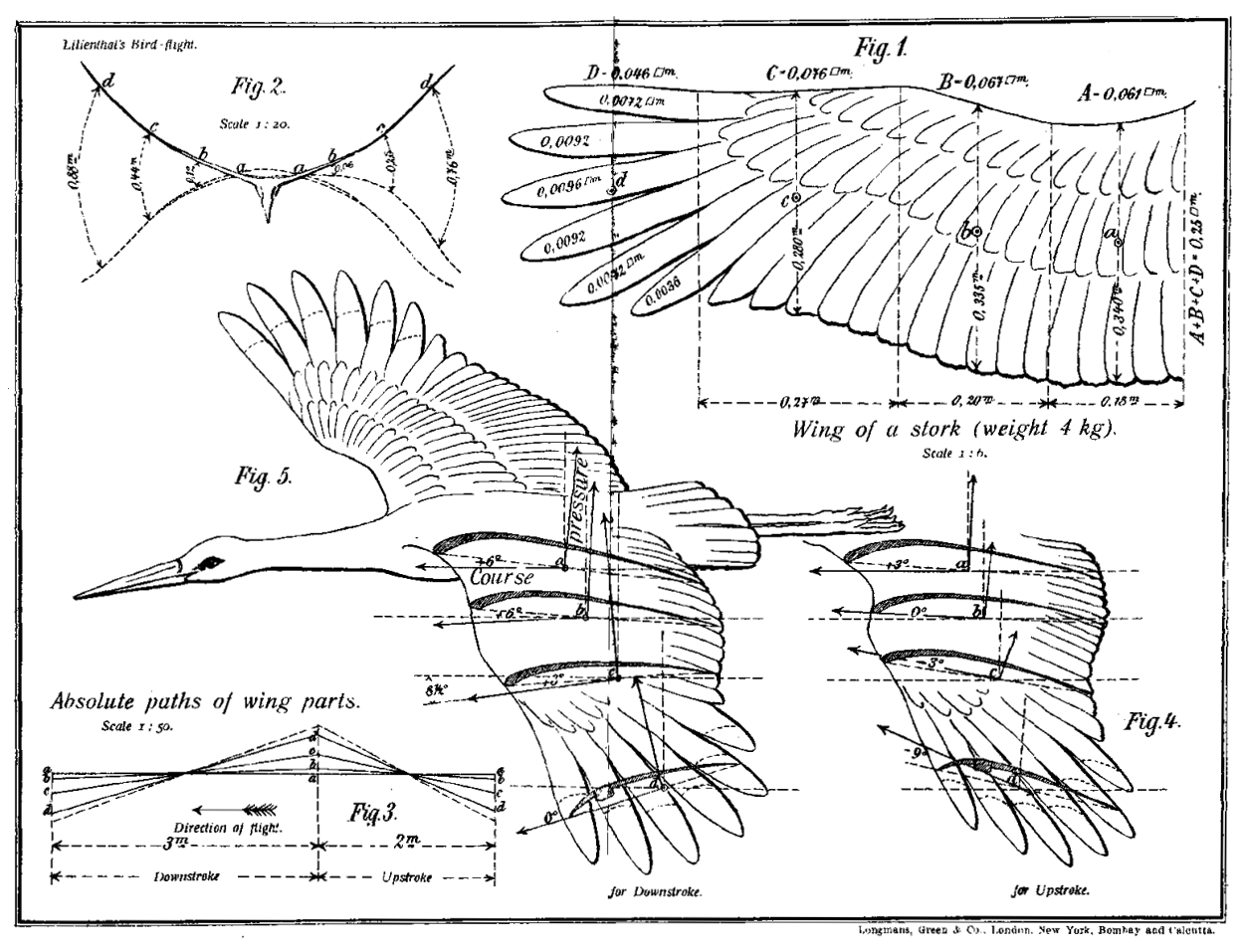
Otto Lilienthal studied the flight of storks in 1889 while designing his glider. Sketches by his brother Gustav Lilienthal.

White storks rely on the uplift of air thermals to soar and glide the long distances of their annual migrations between Europe and Sub-Saharan Africa. For many, the shortest route would take them over the Mediterranean Sea; however, since air thermals do not form over water, they generally detour over land to avoid the trans-Mediterranean flights that would require prolonged energetic wing flapping. It has been estimated that flapping flight metabolises 23 times more body fat than soaring flight per distance travelled. Thus, flocks spiral upwards on rising warm air until they emerge at the top, up to 1,200–1,500 m (3,900–4,900 ft) above the ground (though one record from Western Sudan observed an altitude of 3,300 m (10,800 ft)).

Long flights over water may occasionally be undertaken. A young white stork ringed at the nest in Denmark subsequently appeared in England, where it spent some days before moving on. It was later seen flying over St Mary's, Isles of Scilly, and arrived in a poor condition in Madeira three days later. That island is 500 km (320 mi) from Africa, and twice as far from the European mainland. Migration through the Middle East may be hampered by the khamsin, winds bringing gusty overcast days unsuitable for flying. In these situations, flocks of white storks sit out the adverse weather on the ground, standing and facing into the wind.

== Behaviour ==
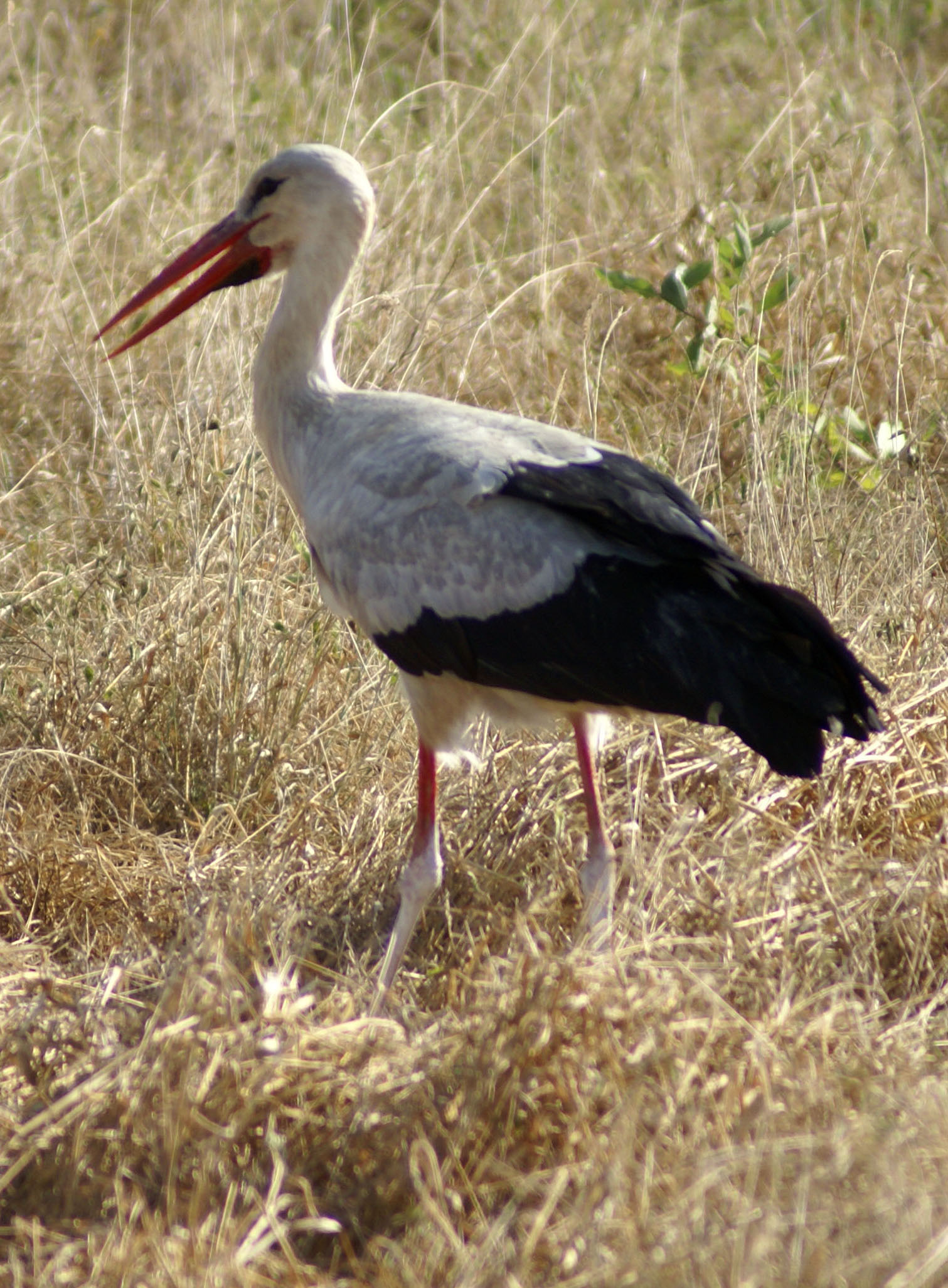
An adult in Tsavo East National Park, Kenya. The lower parts of its legs are covered with its whitish droppings—an example of thermoregulation by urohidrosis.

The white stork is a gregarious bird; flocks of thousands of individuals have been recorded on migration routes and at wintering areas in Africa. Non-breeding birds gather in groups of 40 or 50 during the breeding season. The smaller dark-plumaged Abdim's stork is often encountered with white stork flocks in southern Africa. Breeding pairs of white stork may gather in small groups to hunt, and colony nesting has been recorded in some areas. However, groups among white stork colonies vary widely in size and the social structure is loosely defined; young breeding storks are often restricted to peripheral nests, while older storks attain higher breeding success while occupying the better quality nests toward the centres of breeding colonies. Social structure and group cohesion is maintained by altruistic behaviour such as allopreening. White storks exhibit this behaviour exclusively at the nest site. Standing birds preen the heads of sitting birds; sometimes these are parents grooming juveniles, and sometimes juveniles preen each other. Unlike most storks, it never adopts a spread-winged posture, though it is known to droop its wings (holding them away from its body with the primary feathers pointing downwards) when its plumage is wet.

A white stork's droppings, containing faeces and uric acid, are sometimes directed onto its own legs, making them appear white. The resulting evaporation provides cooling and is termed urohidrosis. Birds that have been ringed can sometimes be affected by the accumulation of droppings around the ring leading to constriction and leg trauma. The white stork has also been noted for tool use by squeezing moss in the beak to drip water into the mouths of its chicks.

=== Communication ===
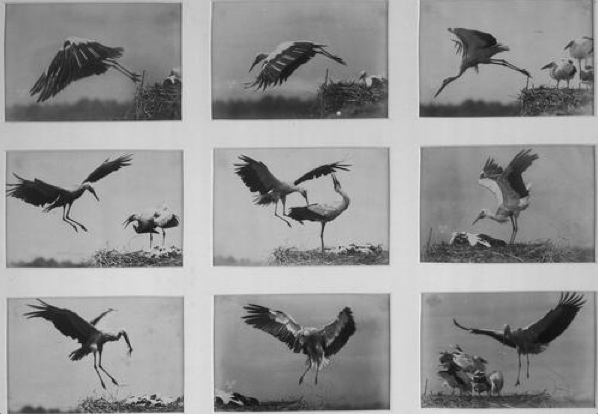
Ottomar Anschütz's images of white storks, taken in 1884—the earliest known photographs of any wild birds

The adult white stork's main sound is noisy bill-clattering, which has been likened to distant machine gun fire. The bird makes these sounds by rapidly opening and closing its beak so that a knocking sound is made each time its beak closes. The clattering is amplified by its throat pouch, which acts as a resonator. Used in a variety of social interactions, bill-clattering generally grows louder the longer it lasts, and takes on distinctive rhythms depending on the situation—for example, slower during copulation and briefer when given as an alarm call. The only vocal sound adult birds generate is a weak, barely audible hiss; however, young birds can generate a harsh hiss, various cheeping sounds, and a cat-like mew that they use to beg for food. Like the adults, the young also clatter their beaks. The up-down display is used for a number of interactions with other members of the species. Here, a stork quickly throws its head backwards so that its crown rests on its back before slowly bringing its head and neck forward again, and this is repeated several times. The display is used as a greeting between birds, post coitus, and also as a threat display. Breeding pairs are territorial over the summer, and use this display, as well as crouching forward with the tails cocked and wings extended.

=== Breeding and lifespan ===
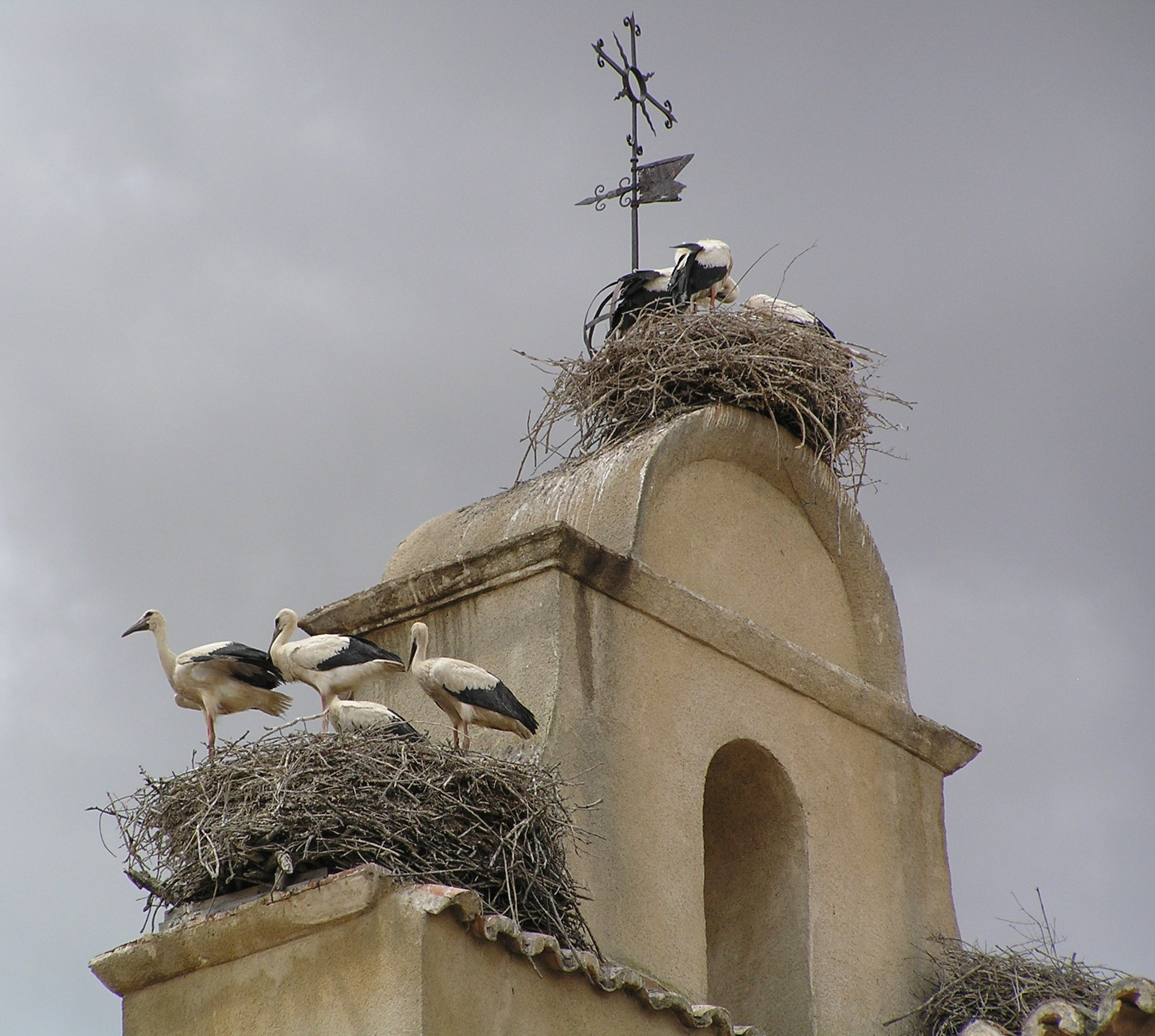
Nests on a belfry in Spain. White storks often form small nesting colonies.

The white stork breeds in open farmland areas with access to marshy wetlands, building a large stick nest in trees, on buildings, or on purpose-built man-made platforms. Each nest is 1–2 m (3.3–6.6 ft) in depth, 0.8–1.5 m (2.6–4.9 ft) in diameter, and 60–250 kg (130–550 lb) in weight. Nests are built in loose colonies. Not persecuted as it is viewed as a good omen, it often nests close to human habitation; in southern Europe, nests can be seen on churches and other buildings. The nest is typically used year after year, especially by older males. The males arrive earlier in the season and choose the nests. Larger nests are associated with greater numbers of young successfully fledged, and appear to be sought after. Nest change is often related to a change in the pairing and failure to raise young the previous year, and younger birds are more likely to change nesting sites. Although a pair may be found to occupy a nest, partners may change several times during the early stages and breeding activities begin only after a stable pairing is achieved.

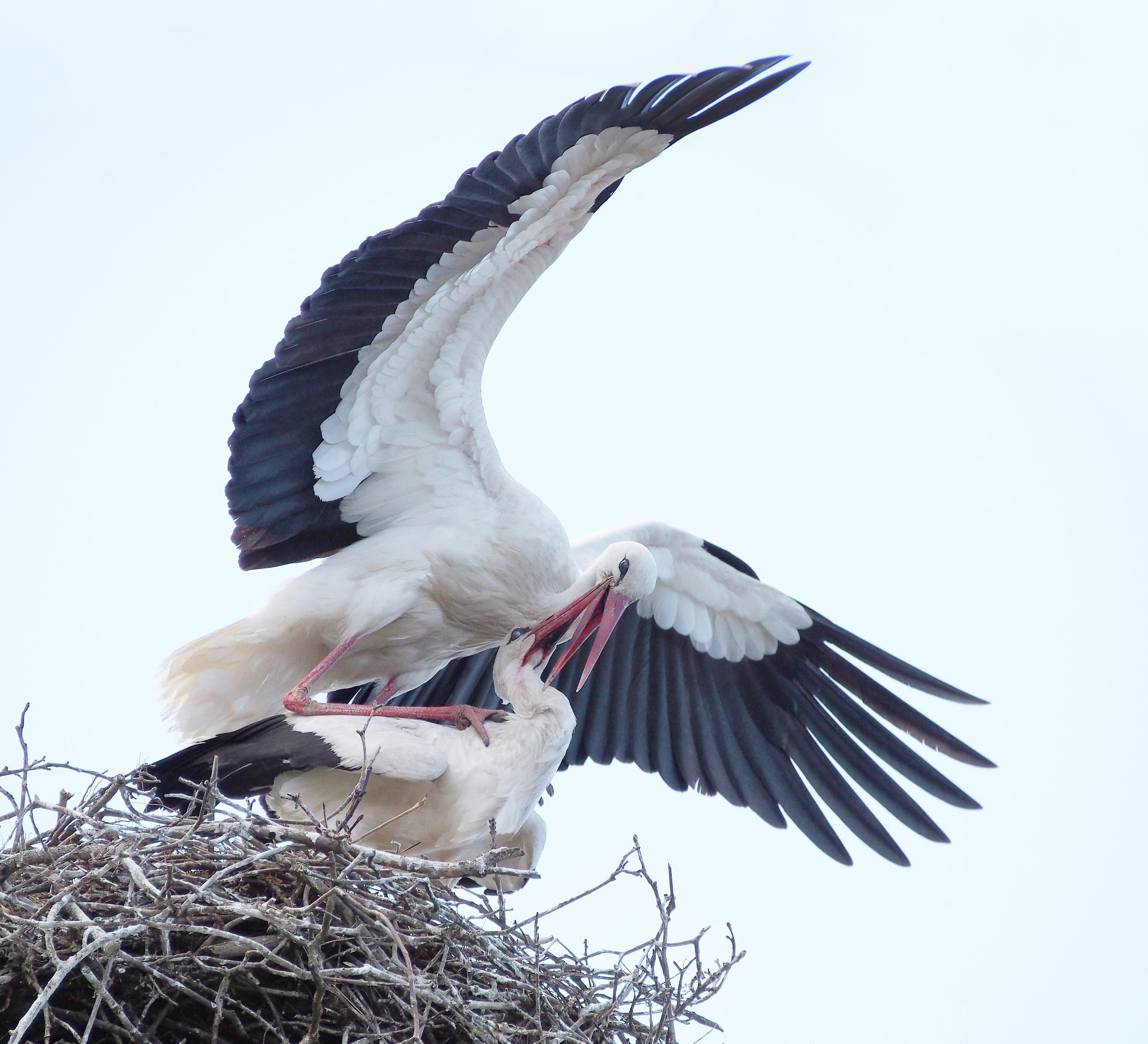
Mating

Several bird species often nest within the large nests of the white stork. Regular occupants are house sparrows, tree sparrows, and common starlings; less common residents include Eurasian kestrels, little owls, European rollers, white wagtails, black redstarts, Eurasian jackdaws, and Spanish sparrows. Active nests may attract insectivorous birds such as swallows, martins, and swifts, where they prey on insects flying around. Paired birds greet by engaging in up-down and head-shaking crouch displays, and clattering the beak while throwing back the head. Pairs copulate frequently throughout the month before eggs are laid. High-frequency pair copulation is usually associated with sperm competition and high frequency of extra-pair copulation. It has been considered that extra-pair copulation rates were low but a 2016 DNA sample study suggests that extra-pair copulation occasionally occurs in white storks. Despite the relatively high extra-pair paternity occurrence compared to other long-lived monogamous birds, white storks form strong pair bonds and high nest fidelity maintained across years.

A white stork pair raises a single brood a year. The female typically lays four eggs, though clutches of one to seven have been recorded. The eggs are white, but often look dirty or yellowish due to a glutinous covering. They typically measure 73 mm × 52 mm (2.9 in × 2.0 in), and weigh 96–129 g (3.4–4.6 oz), of which about 11 g (0.39 oz) is shell. Incubation begins as soon as the first egg is laid, so the brood hatches asynchronously, beginning 33 to 34 days later. The first hatchling typically has a competitive edge over the others. While stronger chicks are not aggressive towards weaker siblings, as is the case in some species, weak or small chicks are sometimes killed by their parents. This behaviour occurs in times of food shortage to reduce brood size and hence increase the chance of survival of the remaining nestlings. White stork nestlings do not attack each other, and their parents' feeding method (disgorging large amounts of food at once) means that stronger siblings cannot directly outcompete weaker ones for food; hence, parental infanticide is an efficient way to reduce brood size. Despite this, the behaviour has not been commonly observed.

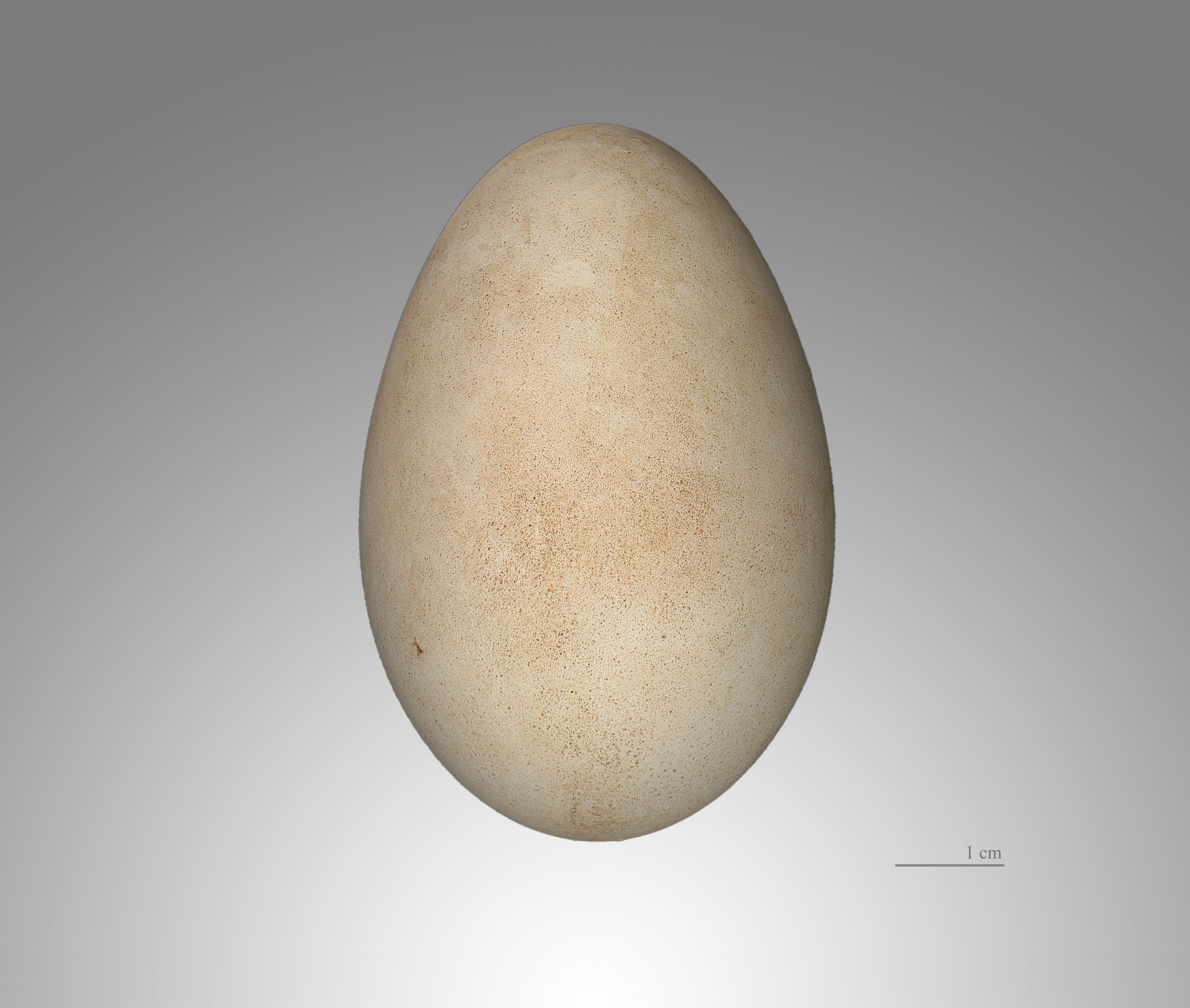
Egg

The temperature and weather around the time of hatching in spring are important; cool temperatures and wet weather increase chick mortality and reduce breeding success rates. Somewhat unexpectedly, studies have found that later-hatching chicks which successfully reach adulthood produce more chicks than do their earlier-hatching nestmates. The body weight of the chicks increases rapidly in the first few weeks and reaches a plateau of about 3.4 kg (7.5 lb) in 45 days. The length of the beak increases linearly for about 50 days. Young birds are fed with earthworms and insects, which are regurgitated by the parents onto the floor of the nest. Older chicks reach into the mouths of parents to obtain food. Chicks fledge 58 to 64 days after hatching.

White storks generally begin breeding when about four years old, although the age of first breeding has been recorded as early as two years and as late as seven years. The oldest known wild white stork lived for 39 years after being ringed in Switzerland, while captive birds have lived for more than 35 years.

=== Feeding ===
White storks consume a wide variety of animal prey. They prefer to forage in meadows that are within roughly 5 km (3 mi) of their nest and sites where the vegetation is shorter so that their prey is more accessible. Their diet varies according to season, locality and prey availability. Common food items include insects (primarily beetles, grasshoppers, locusts and crickets), earthworms, reptiles, amphibians, particularly frog species such as the edible frog (Pelophylax kl. esculentus) and common frog (Rana temporaria) and small mammals such as voles, moles and shrews. Less commonly, they also eat bird eggs and young birds, fish, molluscs, crustaceans and scorpions. They hunt mainly during the day, swallowing small prey whole, but killing and breaking apart larger prey before swallowing. Rubber bands are mistaken for earthworms and consumed, occasionally resulting in fatal blockage of the digestive tract.

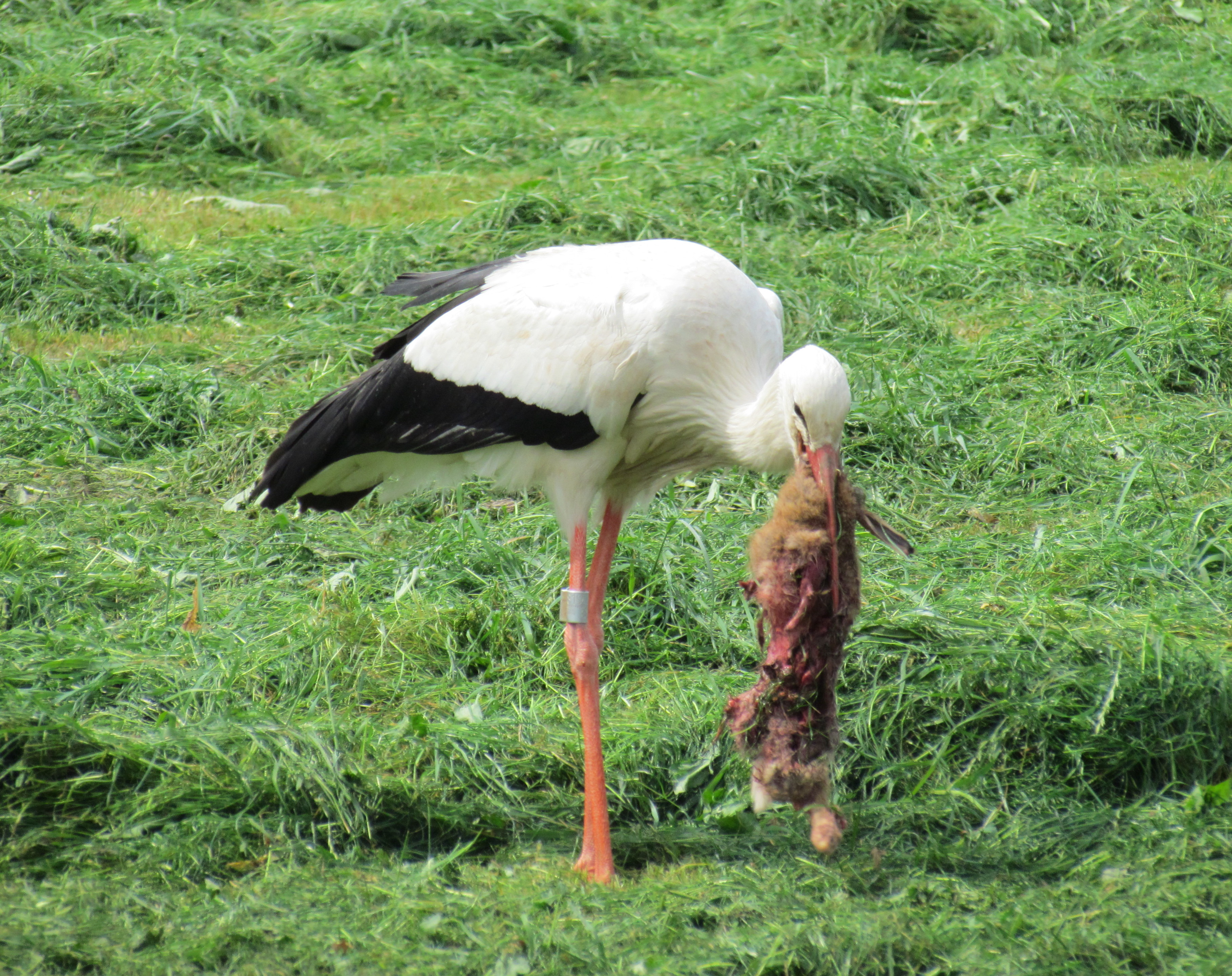
White stork picking at a dead young European rabbit (Oryctolagus cuniculus)

Birds returning to Latvia during spring have been shown to locate their prey, moor frogs (Rana arvalis), by homing in on the mating calls produced by aggregations of male frogs.

The diet of non-breeding birds is similar to that of breeding birds, but food items are more often taken from dry areas. White storks wintering in western India have been observed to follow blackbuck to capture insects disturbed by them. Wintering white storks in India sometimes forage along with the Asian woolly-necked stork (Ciconia episcopus). Food piracy has been recorded in India with a rodent captured by a western marsh harrier appropriated by a white stork, while Montagu's harrier is known to harass white storks foraging for voles in some parts of Poland. White storks can exploit landfill sites for food during the breeding season, migration period and winter.

== Parasites and diseases ==
White stork nests are habitats for an array of small arthropods, particularly over the warmer months after the birds arrive to breed. Nesting over successive years, the storks bring more material to line their nests, and layers of organic material accumulate within them. Not only do their bodies tend to regulate temperatures within the nest, but excrement, food remains and feather and skin fragments provide nourishment for a large and diverse population of free-living mesostigmatic mites. A survey of twelve nests found 13,352 individuals of 34 species, the most common being Macrocheles merdarius, M. robustulus, Uroobovella pyriformis and Trichouropoda orbicularis, which together represented almost 85% of all the specimens collected. These feed on the eggs and larvae of insects and on nematodes, which are abundant in the nest litter. These mites are dispersed by coprophilous beetles, often of the family Scarabaeidae, or on dung brought by the storks during nest construction. Parasitic mites do not occur, perhaps being controlled by the predatory species. The overall effect of the mite population is unclear; the mites may play a role in suppressing harmful organisms (and thus be beneficial), or may themselves have an adverse effect on nestlings.

The birds themselves host species belonging to more than four genera of feather mites. These mites, including Freyanopterolichus pelargicus, and Pelargolichus didactylus live on fungi growing on the feathers. The fungi found on the plumage may feed on the keratin of the outer feathers or on feather oil. Chewing lice such as Colpocephalum zebra tend to be found on the wings, and Neophilopterus incompletus elsewhere on the body.

The white stork also carries several types of internal parasites, including Toxoplasma gondii and intestinal parasites of the genus Giardia. A study of 120 white stork carcasses from Saxony-Anhalt and Brandenburg in Germany yielded eight species of trematode (fluke), four cestode (tapeworm) species, and at least three species of nematode. One species of fluke, Chaunocephalus ferox, caused lesions in the wall of the small intestine in a number of birds admitted to two rehabilitation centres in central Spain, and was associated with reduced weight. It is a recognised pathogen and cause of morbidity in the Asian openbill (Anastomus oscitans). More recently, the thorough study performed by J. Sitko and P. Heneberg in the Czech Republic in 1962–2013 suggested that the central European white storks host 11 helminth species. Chaunocephalus ferox, Tylodelphys excavata and Dictymetra discoidea were reported to be the dominant ones. The other species found included Cathaemasia hians, Echinochasmus spinulosus, Echinostoma revolutum, Echinostoma sudanense, Duboisia syriaca, Apharyngostrigea cornu, Capillaria sp. and Dictymetra discoidea. Juvenile white storks were shown to host less species, but the intensity of infection was higher in the juveniles than in the adult storks.

West Nile virus (WNV) is mainly a bird infection that is transmitted between birds by mosquitos. Migrating birds appear to be important in spread of the virus, the ecology of which remains poorly known. On 26 August 1998, a flock of about 1,200 migrating white storks that had been blown off course on their southward journey landed in Eilat, in southern Israel. The flock was stressed as it had resorted to flapping flight to return to its migratory route, and a number of birds died. A virulent strain of West Nile virus was isolated from the brains of eleven dead juveniles. Other white storks subsequently tested in Israel have shown anti-WNV antibodies. In 2008 three juvenile white storks from a Polish wildlife refuge yielded seropositive results indicating exposure to the virus, but the context or existence of the virus in Poland is unclear.

== Conservation ==
White stork census by country (2014–2015) by breeding pairs: 0–950; 951–2,931; 2,932–6,153; 6,154–9,000; 9,001–14,300; 14,301–23,000; 23,001–46,000; 46,001–52,700; No data

The white stork's decline due to industrialisation and agricultural changes (principally the draining of wetlands and conversion of meadows to crops such as maize) began in the 19th century: the last wild individual in Belgium was seen in 1895, in Sweden in 1955, in Switzerland in 1950 and in the Netherlands in 1991. However, the species has since been reintroduced to many regions. It has been rated as least concern by the IUCN since 1994, after being evaluated as near threatened in 1988. The white stork is one of the species to which the Agreement on the Conservation of African-Eurasian Migratory Waterbirds (AEWA) applies. Parties to the agreement are required to engage in a wide range of conservation strategies described in a detailed action plan. The plan is intended to address key issues such as species and habitat conservation, management of human activities, research, education, and implementation. Threats include the continued loss of wetlands, collisions with overhead power lines, use of persistent pesticides (such as DDT) to combat locusts in Africa, and largely illegal hunting on migration routes and wintering grounds.

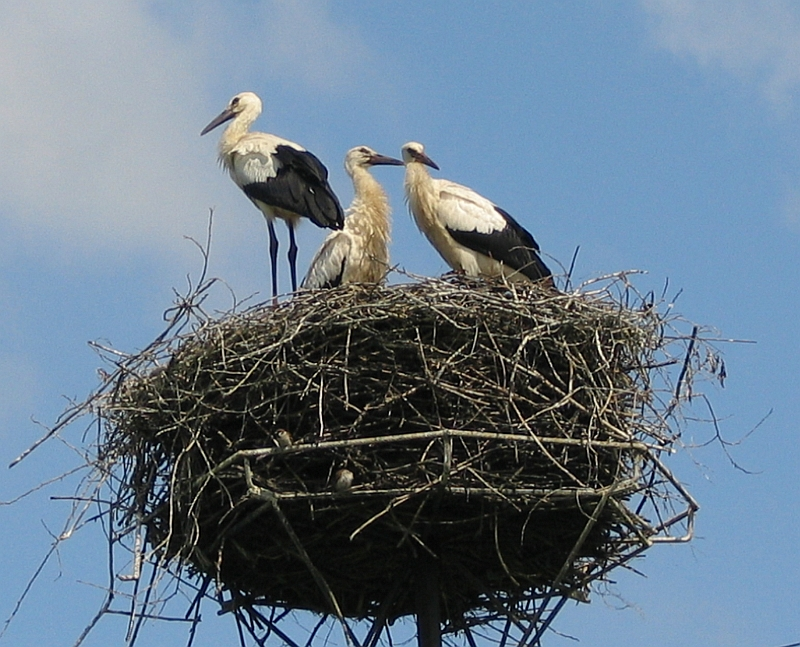
A nest on a man-made platform in Poland. The platform was built as a conservation measure and to prevent storks from disrupting electricity supplies through nesting on pylons. Three young white storks are on the nest, and two Eurasian tree sparrows are perching on the side of the nest.

A large population of white storks breeds in central (Poland, Ukraine and Germany) and southern Europe (Spain and Turkey). In a 2004/05 census, there were 52,500 pairs in Poland, 30,000 pairs in Ukraine, 20,000 pairs in Belarus, 13,000 pairs in Lithuania (the highest known density of this species in the world), 10,700 pairs in Latvia, and 10,200 in Russia. There were around 5,500 pairs in Romania, 5,300 in Hungary, and an estimated 4,956 breeding pairs in Bulgaria. In former Yugoslavia there are 1,700 in Croatia, 1,400 in Serbia, 236 in Slovenia and an estimated 40 breeding pairs in Bosnia and Herzegovina. In Germany, the majority of the total 4,482 pairs were in the eastern region, especially in the states of Brandenburg and Mecklenburg-Vorpommern (1296 and 863 pairs in 2008 respectively). Apart from Spain and Portugal (33,217 and 7,684 pairs in 2004/05 respectively), populations are generally much less stable. In the eastern Mediterranean region, Turkey has a sizeable population of 6,195 pairs, and Greece 2,139 pairs. In Western Europe, the white stork remains a rare bird despite conservation efforts. In 2004, France had only 973 pairs, and the Netherlands had 528 pairs. In Denmark, the species had consistently bred since the 15th century, peaking at several thousand pairs around 1800. Afterwards, it began declining mainly due to habitat loss (especially conversion of wetlands and meadows into modern farming), with only a few tens of breeding pairs in 1974 and none in 2008. Since then, it has reestablished itself and the population has slowly started to increase, reaching ten pairs in 2023. In Armenia, the population of the white stork slightly increased in the period between 2005 and 2015, and by the last data reached 652 pairs.

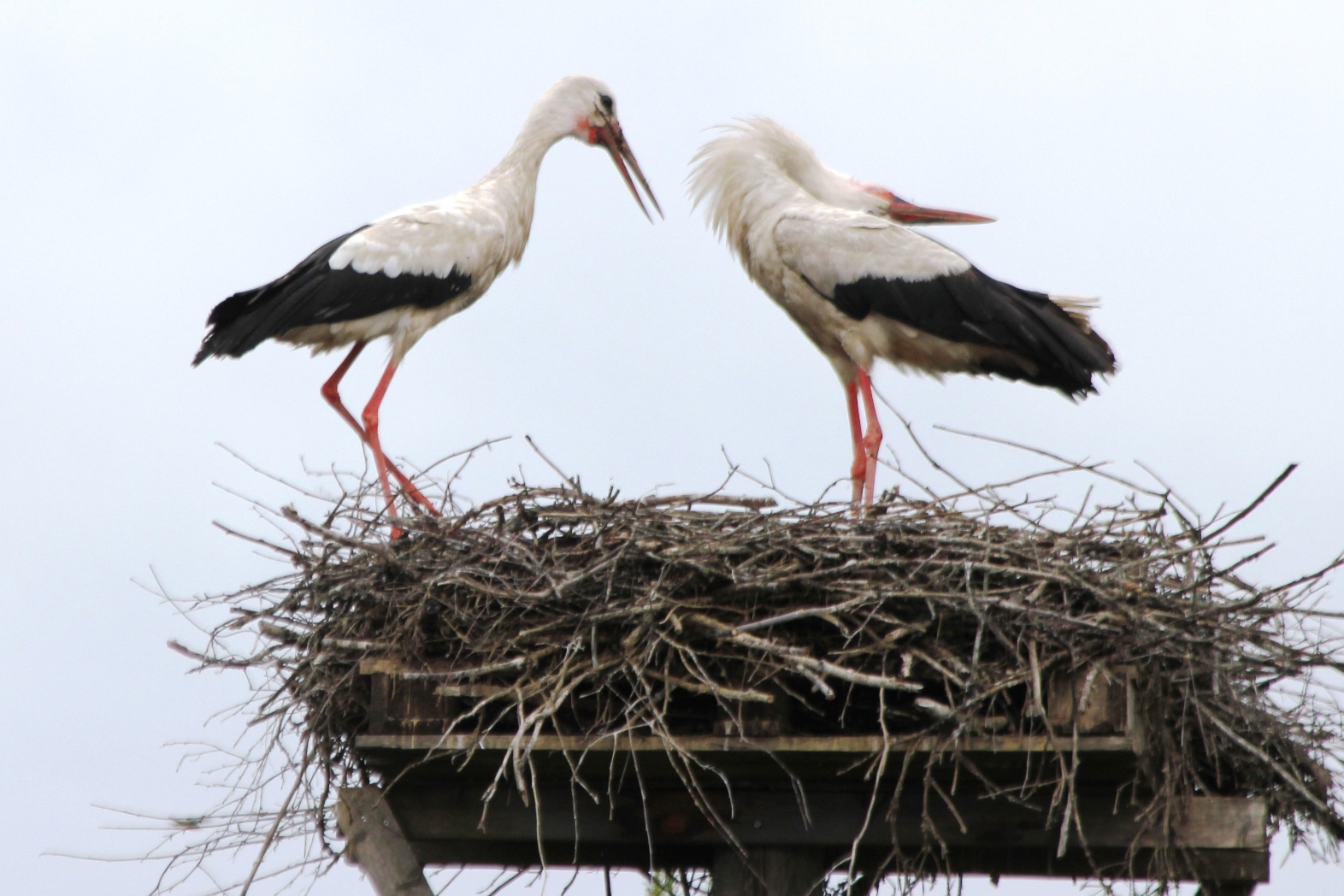
The first known pair in Finland (2015), representing a northward expansion compared to the species' historical breeding range

In the early 1980s, the population had fallen to fewer than nine pairs in the entire upper Rhine River valley, an area closely identified with the white stork for centuries. Conservation efforts successfully increased the population of birds there to 270 pairs (in 2008), largely due to the actions of the Association for the Protection and Reintroduction of Storks in Alsace and Lorraine. The reintroduction of zoo-reared birds has halted further declines in Italy, the Netherlands, and Switzerland. There were 601 pairs breeding in Armenia and around 700 pairs in the Netherlands in 2008, and few pairs also breed in South Africa, typically recent colonists from within the normal wintering population. In Poland, electric poles have been modified with a platform at the top to prevent the white stork's large nest from disrupting the electricity supply, and sometimes nests are moved from an electric pole to a man-made platform. Introductions of zoo-reared birds in the Netherlands has been followed up by feeding and nest-building programs by volunteers. Similar reintroduction programs are taking place in Sweden, and Switzerland, where 175 pairs were recorded breeding in 2000. Long-term viability of the population in Switzerland is unclear as breeding success rates are low, and supplementary feeding does not appear to be of benefit. However, as of 2017, 470 adults and 757 young ones were recorded in Switzerland. Historically, the species' northern breeding limit was at Estonia, but it has moved slowly northwards (possibly due to warmer temperatures) into Karelia and in 2015 the first ever known breeding happened in Finland.

In August 2019, 24 juveniles were released at the Knepp Estate in West Sussex, and others at a site near Tunbridge Wells and at the Wintershall Estate, near Godalming, as part of a project to introduce the white stork as a breeding species in South East England, for the first time since 1416. In 2020, the program was successful with the birth of five baby storks.

In 2025, white storks were hatched for the first time at Celtic Rewilding in North Staffordshire for possibly hundreds of years. This marked the start of the Midlands Stork Project, which aims to reintroduce the species to Willington Wetlands, Derbyshire, run by Derbyshire Wildlife Trust and funded by a £300,000 grant from Veolia Environmental Trust. In 2026, three chicks bred by Celtic Rewilding were released into a specially constructed aviary in order to begin the process of re-establishment.

== In culture ==
=== Cultural associations ===
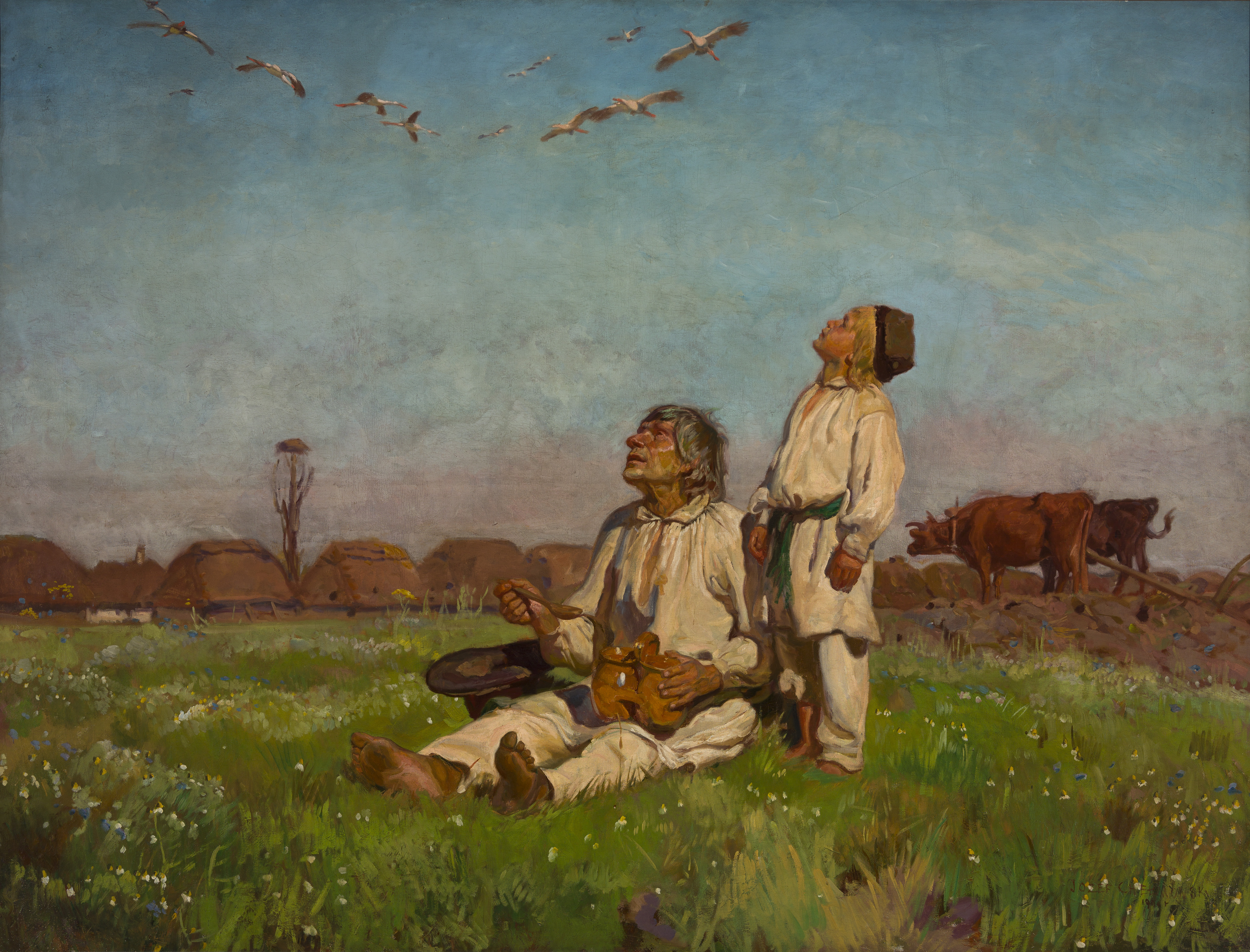
Bociany (Storks), an oil painting of 1900, 150×198 cm, by Józef Chełmoński (1849–1914), National Museum in Warsaw

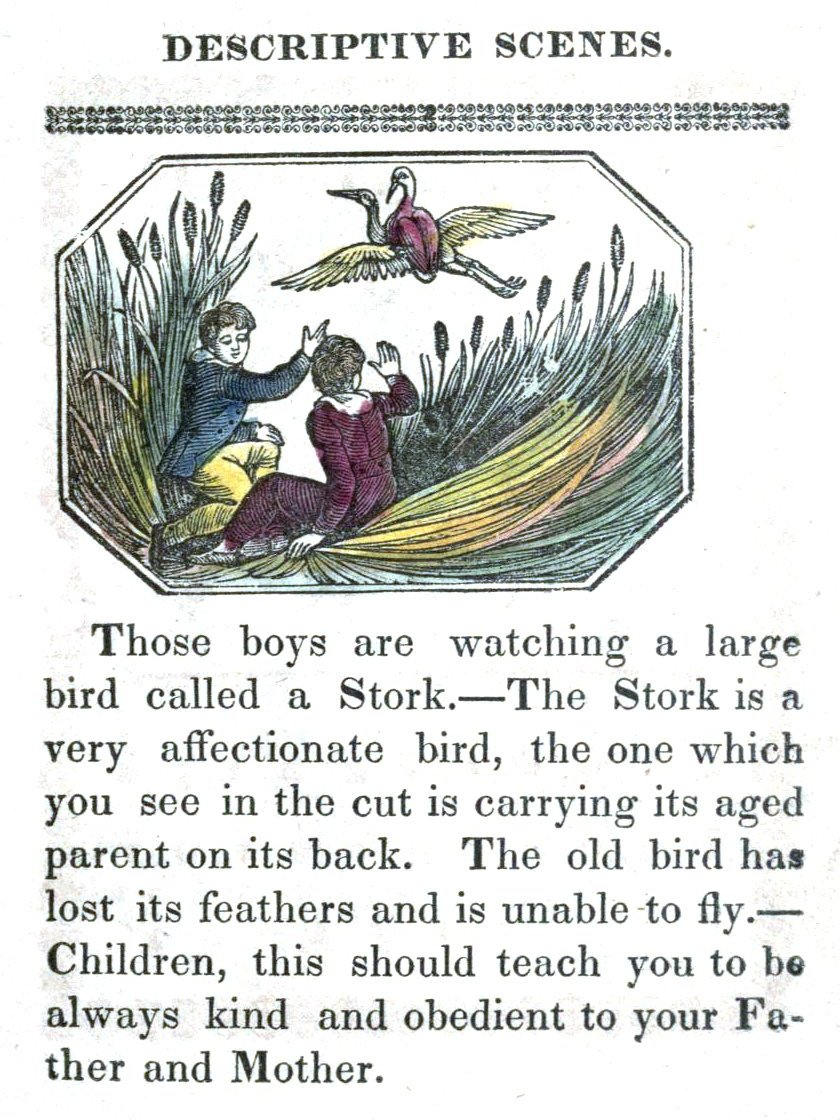
Supposed filial virtues of the stork in a children's moral education text from 1831

Due to its large size, predation on vermin, and nesting behaviour close to human settlements and on rooftops, the white stork has an imposing presence that has influenced human culture and folklore. Greek and Roman mythology portray storks as models of parental devotion. The Trojan princess Antigone was transformed into a white stork by the goddess Hera for trying to compete with the goddess in beauty. The 3rd century Roman writer Aelian citing the authority of Alexander of Myndus noted in his De natura animalium (book 3, chapter 23) that aged storks flew away to oceanic islands where they were transformed into humans as a reward for their piety towards their parents. The bird is featured in at least three of Aesop's Fables: The Fox and the Stork, The Farmer and the Stork, and The Frogs Who Desired a King. Storks were also thought to care for their aged parents, feeding them and even transporting them, and children's books depicted them as a model of filial values. A Greek law called Pelargonia, from the Ancient Greek word pelargos for stork, required citizens to take care of their aged parents. The Greeks also held that killing a stork could be punished with death. Storks were allegedly protected in Ancient Thessaly as they hunted snakes, and widely held to be Virgil's "white bird". Roman writers noted the white stork's arrival in spring, which alerted farmers to plant their vines. On occasion ancient Egyptians mummified White storks.

Followers of Islam revered storks because they made an annual pilgrimage to Mecca on their migration. Some of the earliest understandings of bird migration were initiated by an interest in white storks; Pfeilstörche ("arrow storks") were found in Europe with African arrows embedded in their bodies. A well-known example of such a stork found in the summer of 1822 in the German town of Klütz in Mecklenburg was made into a mounted taxidermy specimen, complete with the ornate African arrow, that is now in the University of Rostock.

Storks have little fear of humans, provided they are not disturbed, and often nest on buildings in Europe. In Germany, the presence of a nest on a house was believed to protect against fires. They were also protected because of the belief that their souls were human. German, Dutch and Polish households would encourage storks to nest on houses, sometimes by constructing purpose-built high platforms, to bring good luck. Across much of Central and Eastern Europe it is believed that storks bring harmony to a family on whose property they nest. White storks are seen as a "cultural icon" in Armenia with their nests seen as a sign of good luck. It has been seen as a virtuous bird as early as the 13th century, with the motif of conflict between the snake and the stork being widespread in Armenian folklore.

The white stork is a popular motif on postage stamps, and it is featured on more than 120 stamps issued by more than 60 stamp-issuing entities. It is the national bird of Lithuania, Belarus and Poland, and it was a Polish mascot at the Expo 2000 Fair in Hanover. Storks nesting in Polish villages such as Żywkowo have made them tourist attractions, drawing 2000–5000 visitors a year in 2014. In the 19th century, storks were also thought to only live in countries having a republican form of government. Polish poet Cyprian Kamil Norwid mentioned storks in his poem Moja piosnka (II) ("My Song (II)"):

For the land where it's a great travesty
To harm a stork's nest in a pear tree,
For storks serve us all ...
I am homesick, Lord! ...

— translated by Walter Whipple

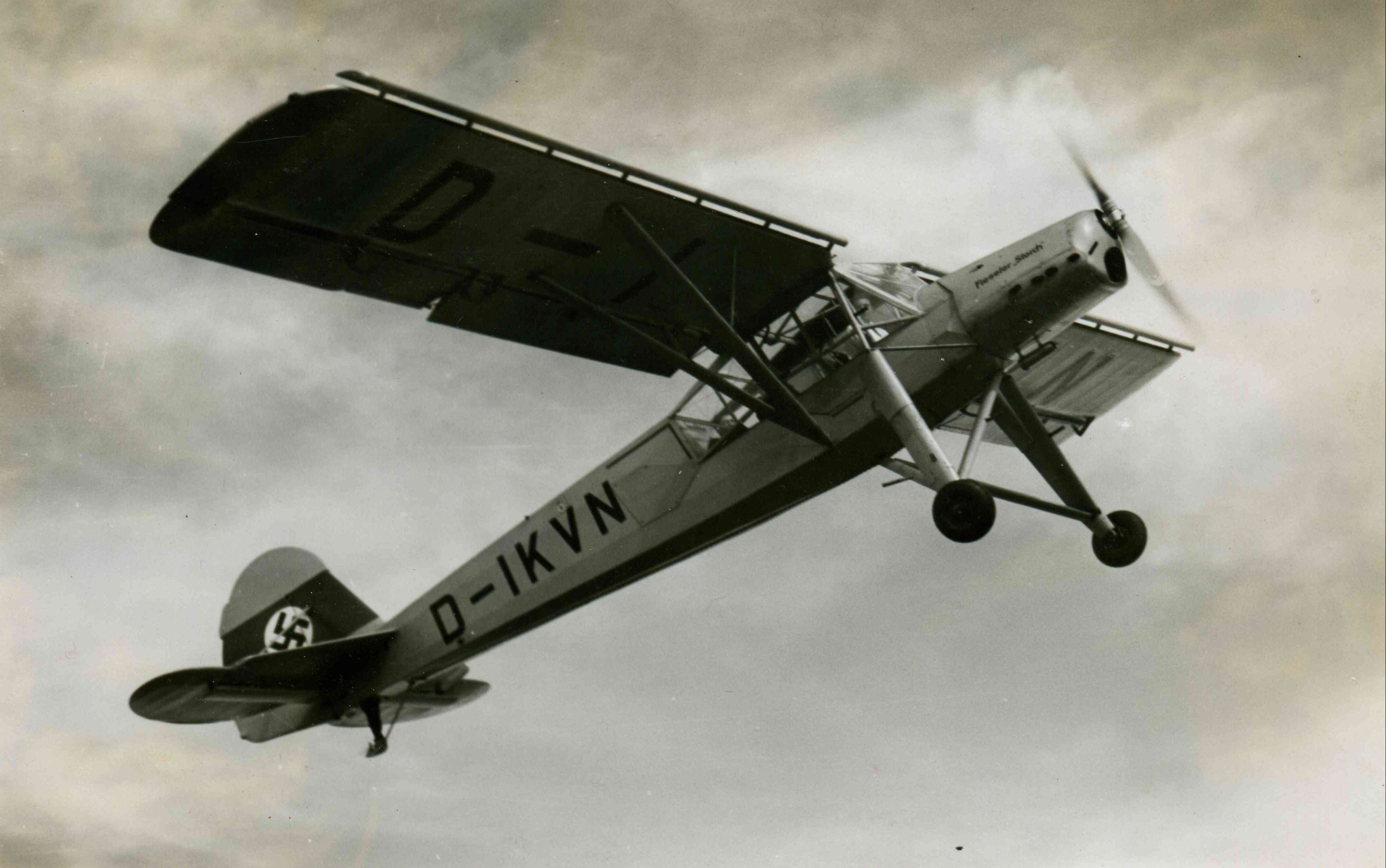
The Fieseler Fi 156 Storch received its nickname from its landing gear, resembling two long legs, and its flight style.

In 1942, Heinrich Himmler sought to use storks to carry Nazi propaganda leaflets so as to win support from the Boers in South Africa. The idea for this "Storchbein-Propaganda" plan was a secret that was transmitted by Walter Schellenberg to be examined by the German ornithologist Ernst Schüz at the Rossiten bird observatory, who pointed out that the probability of finding marked storks in Africa was less than one percent, requiring 1000 birds to transmit 10 leaflets successfully. The plan was then dropped.

=== Storks and delivery of babies ===
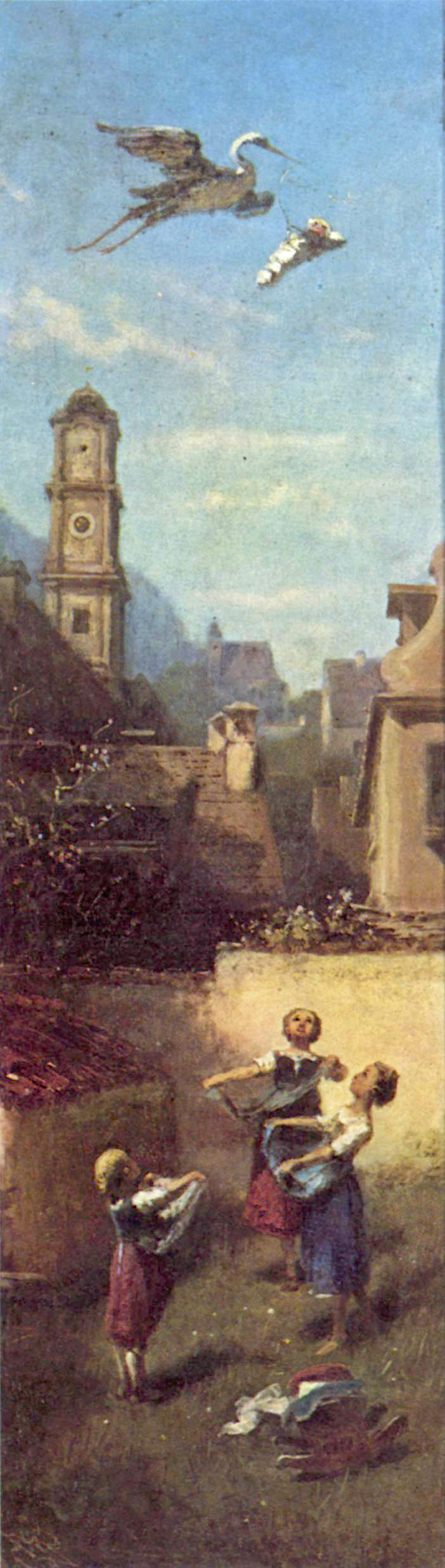
Der Klapperstorch (The Stork), a painting by Carl Spitzweg (1808–1885)

According to European folklore, the stork is responsible for bringing babies to new parents. The legend is very ancient, but was popularised by a 19th-century Hans Christian Andersen story called "The Storks". German folklore held that storks found babies in caves or marshes and brought them to households in a basket on their backs or held in their beaks. These caves contained adebarsteine or "stork stones". The babies would then be given to the mother or dropped down the chimney. Households would notify when they wanted children by placing sweets for the stork on the window sill. From there the folklore has spread around the world to the Philippines and countries in South America. Birthmarks on the back of the head of a newborn baby, nevus flammeus nuchae, are sometimes referred to as stork-bite.

In Slavic mythology and pagan religion, storks were thought to carry unborn souls from Vyraj to Earth in spring and summer. This belief persists in the modern folk culture of many Slavic countries, in the simplified child story that "storks bring children into the world". Storks were seen by Early Slavs as bringing luck, and killing one would bring misfortune.

Likewise, in Norse mythology, the god Hœnir, responsible for giving reason to the first humans, Ask and Embla, has been connected with the stork through his epithets long-legs and mud-king, along with Indo-European cognates such as Greek κύκνος 'swan' and Sanskrit शकुन.

A long-term study that showed a spurious correlation between the numbers of stork nests and human births is widely used in the teaching of basic statistics as an example to highlight that correlation does not necessarily indicate causation.

Psychoanalyst Marvin Margolis suggested that the enduring nature of the stork fable of the newborn is linked to its addressing a psychological need, in that it allays the discomfort of discussing sex and procreation with children. Birds have long been associated with the maternal symbols from pagan goddesses, such as Juno, to the Holy Spirit, and the stork may have been chosen for its white plumage depicting purity, size, and flight at high altitude likened to flying between Earth and Heaven. The fable and its relation to the internal world of the child have been discussed by Sigmund Freud and Carl Jung. In fact, Jung recalled being told the story himself upon the birth of his own sister. The traditional link with the newborn continues with their use in advertising for such products as nappies and baby announcements.

There were also negative aspects to stork folklore; a Polish folk tale relates how God made the stork's plumage white, while the Devil gave it black wings, imbuing it with both good and evil impulses. They were also associated with handicapped or stillborn babies in Germany, explained as the stork having dropped the baby en route to the household, or as revenge or punishment for past wrongdoing. A mother who was confined to bed around the time of childbirth was said to have been "bitten" by the stork. In Denmark, storks were said to toss a nestling off the nest and then an egg in successive years. In medieval England, storks were also associated with adultery, possibly inspired by their courtship rituals. Their preening and posture saw them linked with the attribute of self-conceit. Children of African American slaves were sometimes told that storks brought white babies, while black babies were born from buzzard eggs.

=== Euro redesign ===
With the help of a Motifs Advisory Group, the Governing Council of the European Central Bank selected the "white stork flying over a meandering river in an unconfined river valley" as a potential front motif for the 2020s redesign of the 50€ banknote, with the reverse featuring the building of the Court of Justice of the European Union.

== See also ==
- Klepetan and Malena

== Works cited ==
- Cramp, Stanley, ed. (1977). Handbook of the Birds of Europe, the Middle East and North Africa, the Birds of the Western Palearctic, Volume 1: Ostrich to Ducks. Oxford University Press. ISBN 978-0-19-857358-6.
- Elliott, Andrew (1992). "Family Ciconiidae (Storks)". In del Hoyo, Josep; Elliott, Andrew; Sargatal, Jordi (eds.). Handbook of the Birds of the World, Volume 1: Ostrich to Ducks. Barcelona: Lynx Edicions. ISBN 978-84-87334-10-8.
- Newton, Ian (2010). Bird Migration. Collins New Naturalist Library. Vol. 113. London: Collins. ISBN 978-0-00-730732-6.
- Svensson, Lars; Grant, Peter J. (1999). Collins Bird Guide. London: HarperCollins. ISBN 978-0-00-219728-1.
- Snow, David William; Perrin, C.M.; Gillmor, Robert; et al., eds. (1998). The Birds of the Western Palearctic, Vol. 1: Non-Passerines (Concise ed.). Oxford University Press. ISBN 978-0-19-854099-1.
- Van den Bossche, Willem (2002). Eastern European White Stork Populations: Migration Studies and Elaboration of Conservation Measures (PDF). (In collaboration with: Berthold, Peter; Kaatz, Michael; Nowak, Eugeniusz; Querner, Ulrich). Bonn: Bundesamt für Naturschutz (BfN)/German Federal Agency for Nature Conservation. Archived from the original (PDF) on 2011-07-18.
