= Macrocheles analis =

Scientific classification
- Kingdom: Animalia
- Phylum: Arthropoda
- Subphylum: Chelicerata
- Class: Arachnida
- Order: Mesostigmata
- Family: Macrochelidae
- Genus: Macrocheles
- Species: M. analis

Binomial name
- Macrocheles analis Hyatt & Emberson, 1988

Species of mite

Macrocheles analis is a species of mite in the family Macrochelidae.
