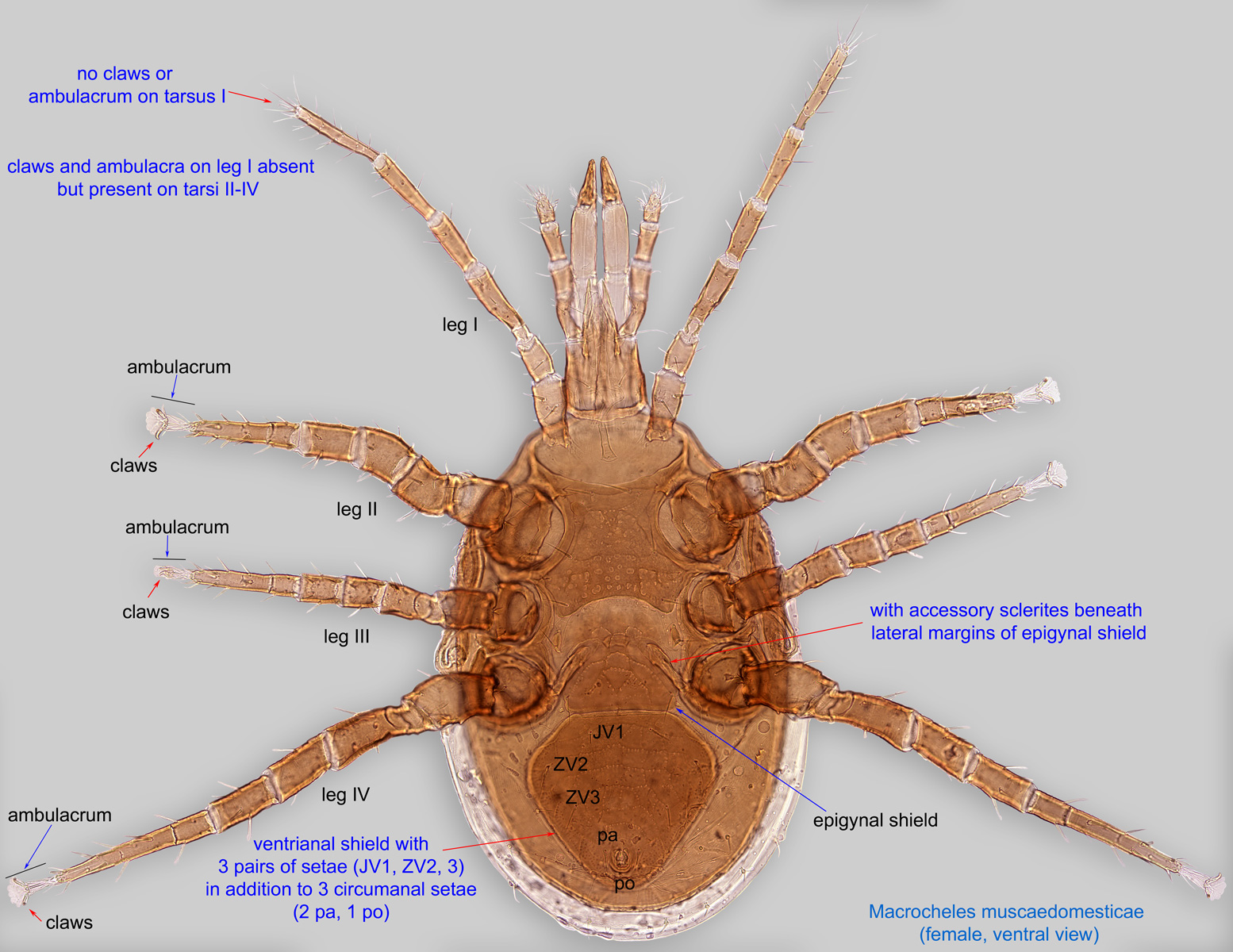
- Macrocheles muscadomesticae

Scientific classification
- Kingdom: Animalia
- Phylum: Arthropoda
- Subphylum: Chelicerata
- Class: Arachnida
- Order: Mesostigmata
- Family: Macrochelidae
- Genus: Macrocheles; Latreille, 1829

Species
- See text

= Macrocheles =

Genus of mites

Macrocheles is a genus of mites in the family Macrochelidae that includes over 80 described species.

== Species ==
These 81 species belong to the genus Macrocheles:

- Macrocheles analis (Hyatt & Emberson)
- Macrocheles baliensis Takaku & Hartini, 2001
- Macrocheles beieri Johnston, 1970
- Macrocheles bertrandi Niogret & Nicot, 2008
- Macrocheles caelatus Berlese
- Macrocheles carinatus (C.L.Koch, 1839)
- Macrocheles chaetopus Petrova, 1967
- Macrocheles coenosus Takaku, 1996
- Macrocheles craspedochetes Glida & Bertrand, 2003
- Macrocheles dayaci Dwibadra & Takaku, 2014
- Macrocheles decoloratus (C.L.Koch, 1839)
- Macrocheles dentatus (Evans & Browning, 1956)
- Macrocheles depuncta Petrova, 1967
- Macrocheles embersoni
- Macrocheles evansi (Balogh, 1958)
- Macrocheles falsiglaber Glida & Bertrand, 2003
- Macrocheles glaber (J.Müller, 1860)
- Macrocheles goncharovae Bregetova, 1977
- Macrocheles hamatus Oudemans, 1915
- Macrocheles hoffmannae Mendez, 1968
- Macrocheles insignitus (Berlese)
- Macrocheles ivanovi Bregetova & Koroleva, 1960
- Macrocheles jabarensis Hartini & Takaku, 2003
- Macrocheles jonggolensis Hartini & Takaku, 2003
- Macrocheles kaiju Knee, 2017
- Macrocheles lagodekhensis Bregetova & Koroleva, 1960
- Macrocheles laiae Tseng, 1989
- Macrocheles lisae Niogret & Nicot, 2007
- Macrocheles lumareti Niogret & Nicot, 2008
- Macrocheles lundae Krantz
- Macrocheles magnus Tseng, 1989
- Macrocheles mammifer Berlese, 1918
- Macrocheles matrius (Hull, 1925)
- Macrocheles merdarius (A.Berlese, 1889)
- Macrocheles minervae Cicolani, 1982
- Macrocheles montanus (C.Willmann, 1951)
- Macrocheles monticola Takaku & Hartini, 2001
- Macrocheles montivagus Berlese, 1887
- Macrocheles muscaedomesticae (Scopoli, 1772)
- Macrocheles nataliae Bregetova & Koroleva, 1960
- Macrocheles neglectus Bregetova, 1977
- Macrocheles nemoralis Hull, 1925
- Macrocheles niksarensis Özbek, 2017
- Macrocheles opacus (Koch, 1839)
- Macrocheles ovoidalis
- Macrocheles palustris Hull, 1925
- Macrocheles pannosus Hull, 1925
- Macrocheles parmulatus Hull, 1925
- Macrocheles paucipectinatus Niogret & Nicot, 2007
- Macrocheles pavlovskii Bregetova & Koroleva, 1960
- Macrocheles penicilliger (Berlese, 1904)
- Macrocheles peniculatus Berlese, 1918
- Macrocheles perglaber Filipponi & Pegazzano, 1962
- Macrocheles pisentii (Berlese, 1882)
- Macrocheles pontina Filipponi & Pegazzano, 1960
- Macrocheles praedafimetorum
- Macrocheles pratum Knee, 2017
- Macrocheles punctatissimus Berlese
- Macrocheles punctoscutatus G.O.Evans & Browning, 1956
- Macrocheles recki Bregetova & Koroleva, 1960
- Macrocheles reductus Petrova, 1966
- Macrocheles riparius Dwibadra & Takaku, 2014
- Macrocheles robustulus (Berlese, 1904)
- Macrocheles roquensis Mendes & Lizaso, 1992
- Macrocheles rotundiscutis Bregetova & Koroleva, 1960
- Macrocheles saceri Costa, 1967
- Macrocheles scutatus (Berlese)
- Macrocheles scutiformis
- Macrocheles seraphim Niogret & Nicot, 2007
- Macrocheles subbadius (A.Berlese, 1904)
- Macrocheles subcoenosus Takaku, 1996
- Macrocheles submarginatus Foa, 1900
- Macrocheles submotus Falconer, 1924
- Macrocheles sukabumiensis Hartini & Takaku, 2003
- Macrocheles tardus (C.L.Koch, 1841)
- Macrocheles terreus (Canestrini & Fanzago)
- Macrocheles transbaicalicus Bregetova & Koroleva, 1960
- Macrocheles tridentinus G. & R.Canestrini, 1884
- Macrocheles vagabundus (Berlese, 1889)
- Macrocheles wainensis Dwibadra & Takaku, 2014
- Macrocheles willowae Knee, 2017
