= Macrocheles subbadius =

Scientific classification
- Kingdom: Animalia
- Phylum: Arthropoda
- Subphylum: Chelicerata
- Class: Arachnida
- Order: Mesostigmata
- Family: Macrochelidae
- Genus: Macrocheles
- Species: M. subbadius

Binomial name
- Macrocheles subbadius (Berlese, 1904)

Species of mite

Macrocheles subbadius is a species of mite in the family Macrochelidae. It is found in New Zealand and Europe.
