= Macrocheles pisentii =

Scientific classification
- Kingdom: Animalia
- Phylum: Arthropoda
- Subphylum: Chelicerata
- Class: Arachnida
- Order: Mesostigmata
- Family: Macrochelidae
- Genus: Macrocheles
- Species: M. pisentii

Binomial name
- Macrocheles pisentii (Berlese, 1882)

Species of mite

Macrocheles pisentii is a species of mite in the family Macrochelidae. It is specialized to live in the nests of Scarabaeus beetles. The mite can be found in Europe, Israel, and northern Africa.
