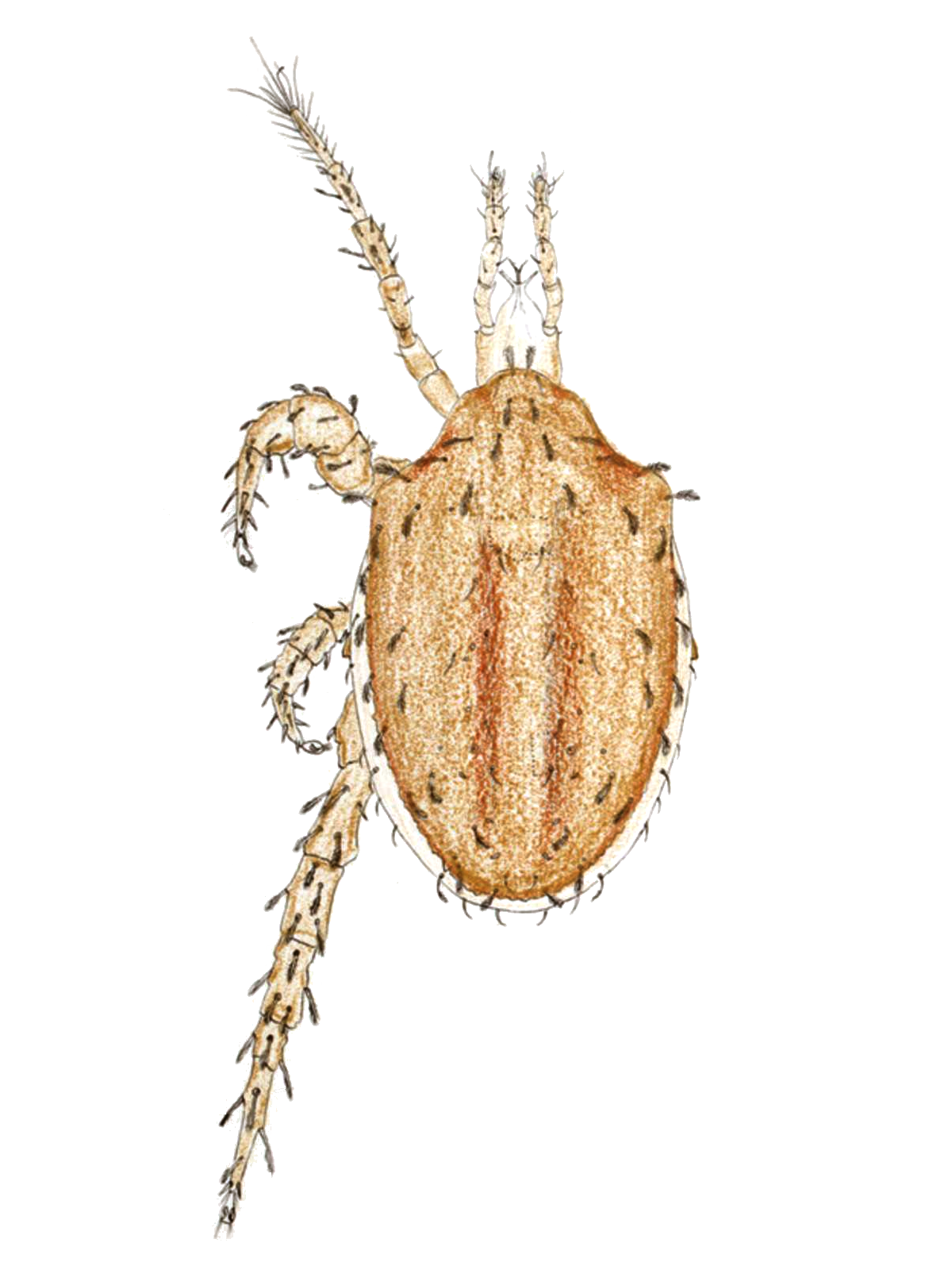
- Macrocheles carinatus

Scientific classification
- Kingdom: Animalia
- Phylum: Arthropoda
- Subphylum: Chelicerata
- Class: Arachnida
- Order: Mesostigmata
- Family: Macrochelidae
- Genus: Macrocheles
- Species: M. carinatus

Binomial name
- Macrocheles carinatus (C.L.Koch, 1839)

= Macrocheles carinatus =

Species of mite

Macrocheles carinatus is a species of mite in the family Macrochelidae. It is found in Europe.
