= Macrocheles perglaber =

Scientific classification
- Kingdom: Animalia
- Phylum: Arthropoda
- Subphylum: Chelicerata
- Class: Arachnida
- Order: Mesostigmata
- Family: Macrochelidae
- Genus: Macrocheles
- Species: M. perglaber

Binomial name
- Macrocheles perglaber Filipponi & Pegazzano, 1962

Species of mite

Macrocheles perglaber is a species of mite in the family Macrochelidae. It is found in New Zealand.
