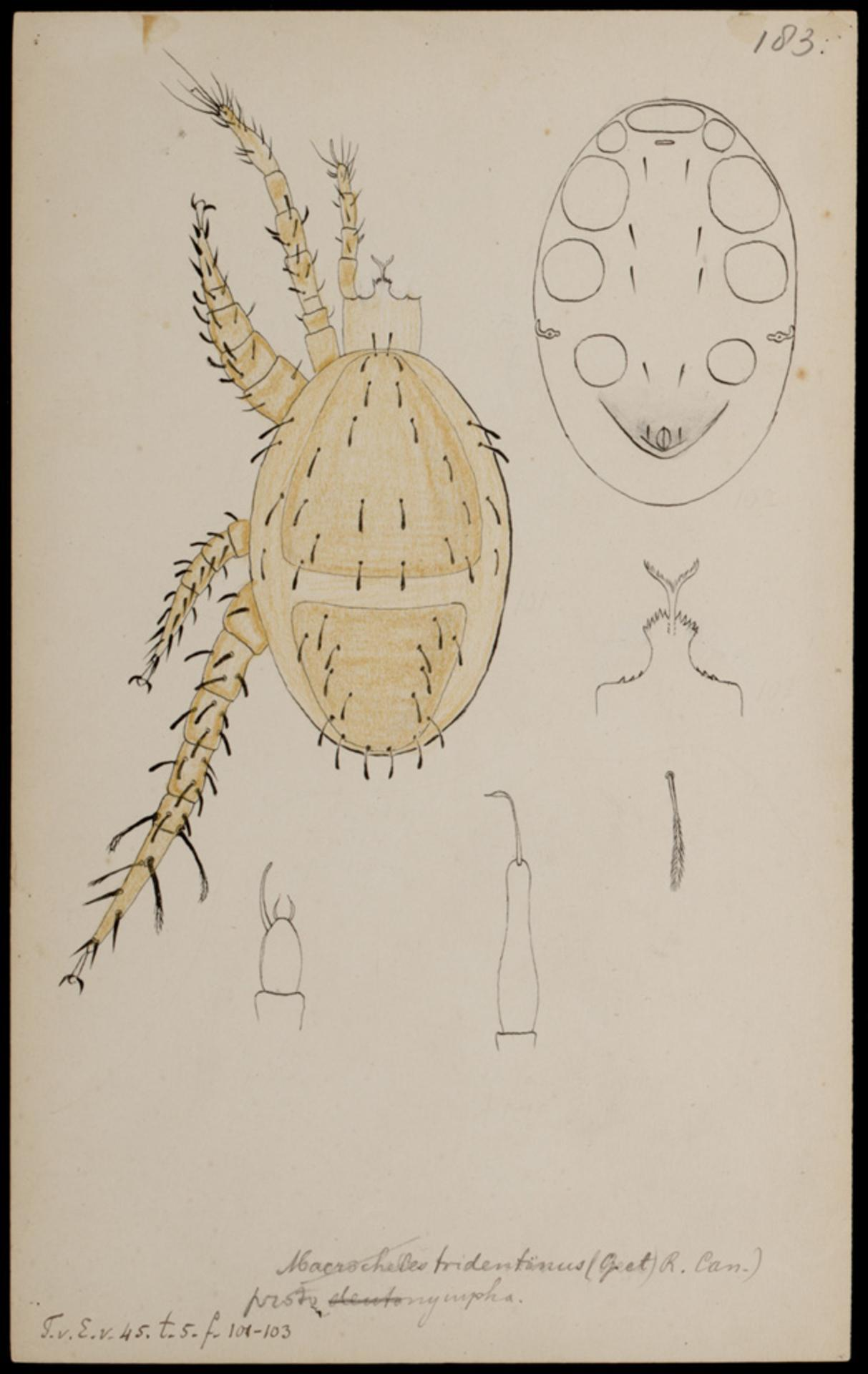

Scientific classification
- Kingdom: Animalia
- Phylum: Arthropoda
- Subphylum: Chelicerata
- Class: Arachnida
- Order: Mesostigmata
- Family: Macrochelidae
- Genus: Macrocheles
- Species: M. tridentinus

Binomial name
- Macrocheles tridentinus G. & R.Canestrini, 1884

= Macrocheles tridentinus =

Species of mite

Macrocheles tridentinus is a species of mite in the family Macrochelidae.
