= Macrocheles penicilliger =

Scientific classification
- Kingdom: Animalia
- Phylum: Arthropoda
- Subphylum: Chelicerata
- Class: Arachnida
- Order: Mesostigmata
- Family: Macrochelidae
- Genus: Macrocheles
- Species: M. penicilliger

Binomial name
- Macrocheles penicilliger (Berlese, 1904)

Species of mite

Macrocheles penicilliger is a species of mite in the family Macrochelidae. It is found in New Zealand.
