= Macrocheles glaber =

Scientific classification
- Kingdom: Animalia
- Phylum: Arthropoda
- Subphylum: Chelicerata
- Class: Arachnida
- Order: Mesostigmata
- Family: Macrochelidae
- Genus: Macrocheles
- Species: M. glaber

Binomial name
- Macrocheles glaber (Müller, 1860)

Species of mite

Macrocheles glaber is a species of mite in the family Macrochelidae. It is found in Europe and New Zealand.
