= Macrocheles baliensis =

Scientific classification
- Kingdom: Animalia
- Phylum: Arthropoda
- Subphylum: Chelicerata
- Class: Arachnida
- Order: Mesostigmata
- Family: Macrochelidae
- Genus: Macrocheles
- Species: M. baliensis

Binomial name
- Macrocheles baliensis Takaku & Hartini, 2001

Species of mite

Macrocheles baliensis is a species of mite in the family Macrochelidae.
