= Grafia =

Grafia may refer to:

- Grafia (plant), a genus of plants in the family Apiaceae
- Grafia, a genus of plants in the family Orchidaceae, synonym of Phalaenopsis
- Grafia, a genus of spiders in the family Macrochelidae, synonym of Trigonholaspis
