= Holostaspella bifoliata =

Scientific classification
- Kingdom: Animalia
- Phylum: Arthropoda
- Subphylum: Chelicerata
- Class: Arachnida
- Order: Mesostigmata
- Family: Macrochelidae
- Genus: Holostaspella
- Species: H. bifoliata

Binomial name
- Holostaspella bifoliata Tragrdh, 1952

Species of mite

Holostaspella bifoliata is a species of mite in the family Macrochelidae. It has been found engaging in phoresis with certain species of Omorgus beetles, including Omorgus monachus and Omorgus persuberosus.
