= Pachylaella =

Scientific classification
- Domain: Eukaryota
- Kingdom: Animalia
- Phylum: Arthropoda
- Subphylum: Chelicerata
- Class: Arachnida
- Order: Mesostigmata
- Family: Macrochelidae
- Genus: Pachylaella; Berlese, 1917

Genus of mites

Pachylaella is a genus of mites in the family Macrochelidae.

This genus was formerly in the family Pachylaelapidae.
