= Vlieghuis =

- Hamlet
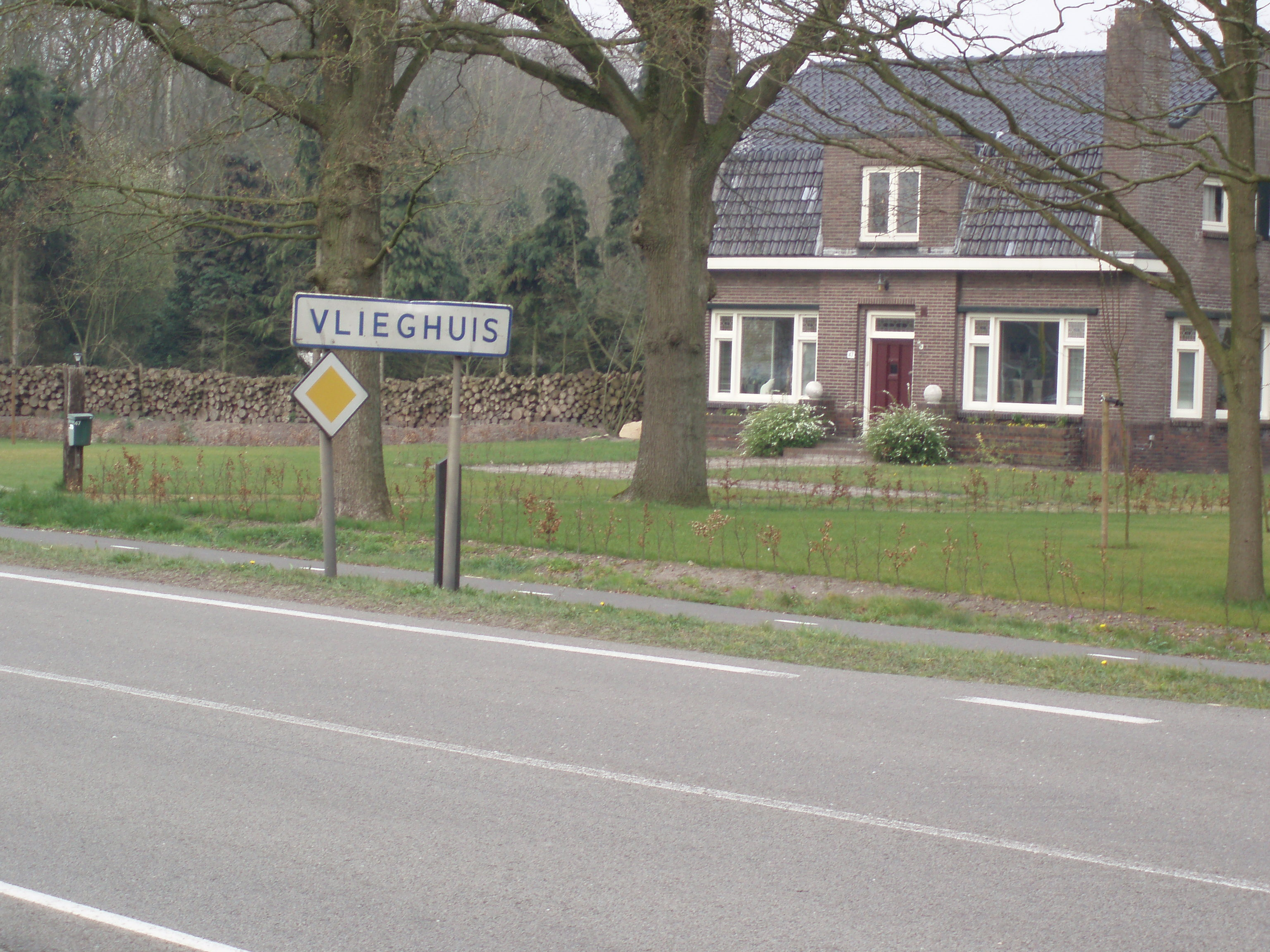
- Entering Vlieghuis

- Location within Drenthe Location within Netherlands
- Coordinates: 52°39′30″N 6°50′15″E
- Country: Netherlands
- Province: Drenthe
- Municipality: Coevorden

Area
  - Total: 6.59 km^{2} (2.54 sq mi)
- Elevation: 10 m (33 ft)

Population (2021)
  - Total: 120
  - Density: 18/km^{2} (47/sq mi)
- Time zone: UTC+1 (CET)
  - Summer (DST): UTC+2 (CEST)
- Postal code: 7742
- Dialing code: 0524

Vlieghuis is a hamlet in the Netherlands and is part of the Coevorden municipality in Drenthe.

Vlieghuis has a joint statistical listing with Padhuis, but the postal authorities have placed it under Coevorden. It was first mentioned in 1538 as Roeleff tem Fleighus, and might be related to the housefly (Musca domestica), however it is not certain. In 1840, it was home to 23 people. Nowadays there are about 20 houses in the hamlet.
