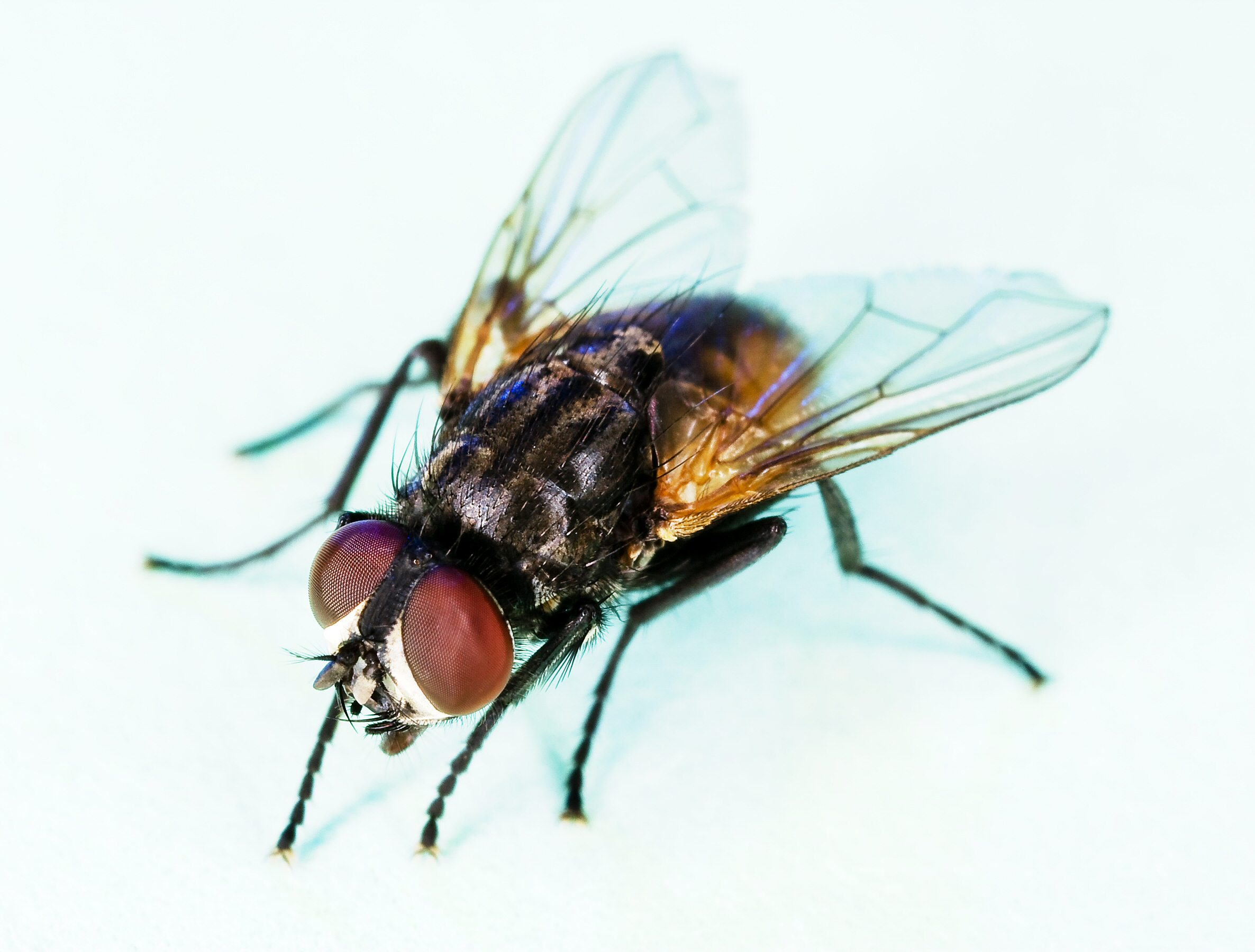
- Adult male

Scientific classification
- Kingdom: Animalia
- Phylum: Arthropoda
- Clade: Pancrustacea
- Class: Insecta
- Order: Diptera
- Family: Muscidae
- Genus: Musca
- Species: M. domestica

Binomial name
- Musca domestica Linnaeus, 1758

Subspecies
- M. d. calleva Walker, 1849; M. d. domestica Linnaeus, 1758

= Housefly =

Species of insect

The housefly (Musca domestica) is a species of fly in the family Muscidae. From its place of origin, possibly in the Middle East, it has spread around the world as a commensal of humans. Adults are gray to black, with four dark, longitudinal lines on the thorax, slightly hairy bodies, and a single pair of membranous wings. They have red compound eyes, set farther apart in the slightly larger female.

The female housefly usually mates only once and stores the sperm for later use. It lays batches of about 100 eggs on decaying organic matter such as food waste, carrion, or feces. These soon hatch into legless white larvae, known as maggots. After two to five days of development, these metamorphose into reddish-brown pupae, about 8 millimetres (3/8 inch) long. Adult flies normally live for two to four weeks, but can hibernate during the winter. The adults feed on a variety of liquid or semi-liquid substances, as well as solid materials which have been softened by their saliva. They can carry pathogens on their bodies and in their feces, contaminate food, and contribute to the transfer of food-borne illnesses, while, in numbers, they can be physically annoying. For these reasons, they are considered pests.

Houseflies, with short life cycles and the ease with which they can be maintained, have been found useful for laboratory research into aging and sex determination. Houseflies appear in literature from Ancient Greek myth and Aesop's "The Impertinent Insect" onwards. Authors sometimes choose the housefly to speak of the brevity of life, as in William Blake's 1794 poem "The Fly", which deals with mortality subject to uncontrollable circumstances.

== Description ==
Adult houseflies are usually 6 to 7 mm (1/4 to 9/32 in) long with a wingspan of 13 to 15 mm (1/2 to 19/32 in). The females tend to be larger winged than males, while males have relatively longer legs. Females tend to vary more in size and there is geographic variation with larger individuals in higher latitudes. The head is strongly convex in front and flat and slightly conical behind. The pair of large compound eyes almost touch in the male, but are more widely separated in the female. They have three simple eyes (ocelli) and a pair of short antennae. Houseflies process visual information around seven times more quickly than humans, enabling them to identify and avoid attempts to catch or swat them, since they effectively see the human's movements in slow motion with their higher flicker fusion rate.

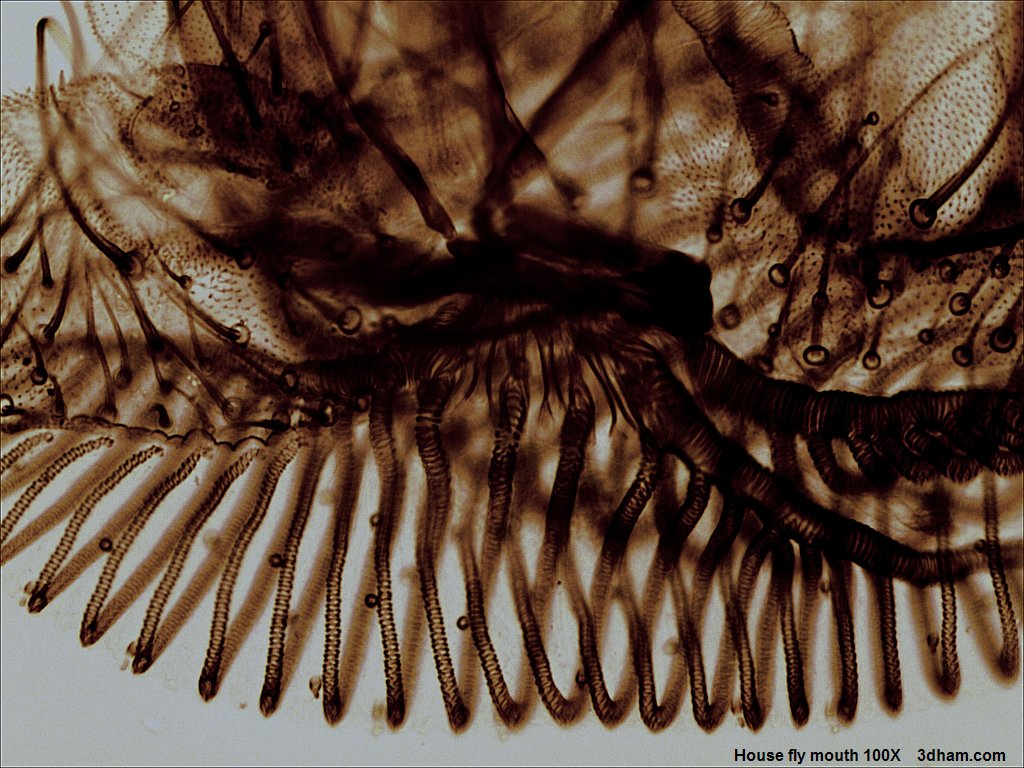
Housefly mouthparts, showing the pseudotracheae, semitubular grooves (dark parallel bands) used for sucking up liquid food

The mouthparts are specially adapted for a liquid diet; the mandibles and maxillae are reduced and not functional, and the other mouthparts form a retractable, flexible proboscis with an enlarged, fleshy tip, the labellum. This is a sponge-like structure that is characterized by many grooves, called pseudotracheae, which suck up fluids by capillary action. It is also used to distribute saliva to soften solid foods or collect loose particles. Houseflies have chemoreceptors, organs of taste, on the tarsi of their legs, so they can identify foods such as sugars by walking over them. Houseflies are often seen cleaning their legs by rubbing them together, enabling the chemoreceptors to taste afresh whatever they walk on next. At the end of each leg is a pair of claws, and below them are two adhesive pads, pulvilli, enabling the housefly to walk up smooth walls and ceilings using Van der Waals forces. The claws help the housefly to unstick the foot for the next step. Houseflies walk with a common gait on horizontal and vertical surfaces with three legs in contact with the surface and three in movement. On inverted surfaces, they alter the gait to keep four feet stuck to the surface. Houseflies land on a ceiling by flying straight towards it; just before landing, they make a half roll and point all six legs at the surface, absorbing the shock with the front legs and sticking a moment later with the other four.

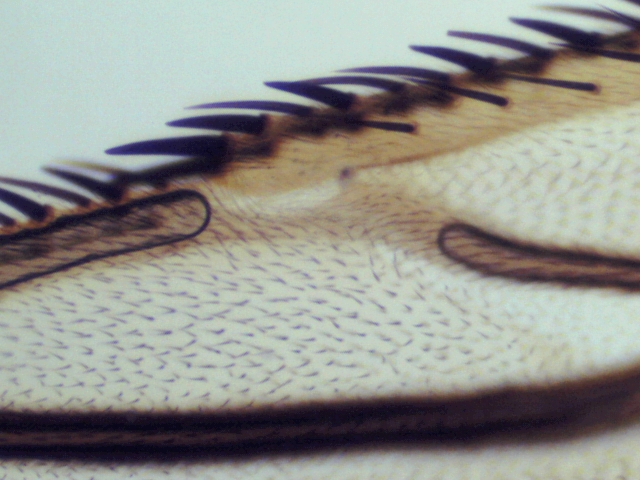
A housefly wing under 250x magnification

The thorax is a shade of gray, sometimes even black, with four dark, longitudinal bands of even width on the dorsal surface. The whole body is covered with short hairs. Like other Diptera, houseflies have only one pair of wings; what would be the hind pair is reduced to small halteres that aid in flight stability. The wings are translucent with a yellowish tinge at their base. Characteristically, the medial vein (M1+2 or fourth long vein) shows a sharp upward bend. Each wing has a lobe at the back, the calypter, covering the haltere. The abdomen is gray or yellowish with a dark stripe and irregular dark markings at the side. It has 10 segments which bear spiracles for respiration. In males, the ninth segment bears a pair of claspers for copulation, and the 10th bears anal cerci in both sexes.

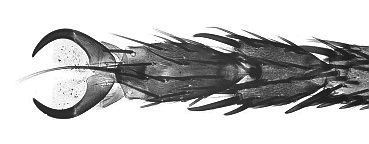
Micrograph of the tarsus of the leg showing claws and bristles, including the central one between the two pulvilli known as the empodium

A variety of species around the world appear similar to the housefly, such as the lesser house fly, Fannia canicularis; the stable fly, Stomoxys calcitrans; and other members of the genus Musca such as M. vetustissima, the Australian bush fly and several closely related taxa that include M. primitiva, M. shanghaiensis, M. violacea, and M. varensis. The systematic identification of species may require the use of region-specific taxonomic keys and can require dissections of the male reproductive parts for confirmation.

== Distribution ==
The housefly is probably the insect with the widest distribution in the world; it is largely associated with humans and has accompanied them around the globe. It is present in the Arctic, as well as in the tropics, where it is abundant. It is present in all populated parts of Europe, Asia, Africa, Australasia, and the Americas.

== Evolution and taxonomy ==
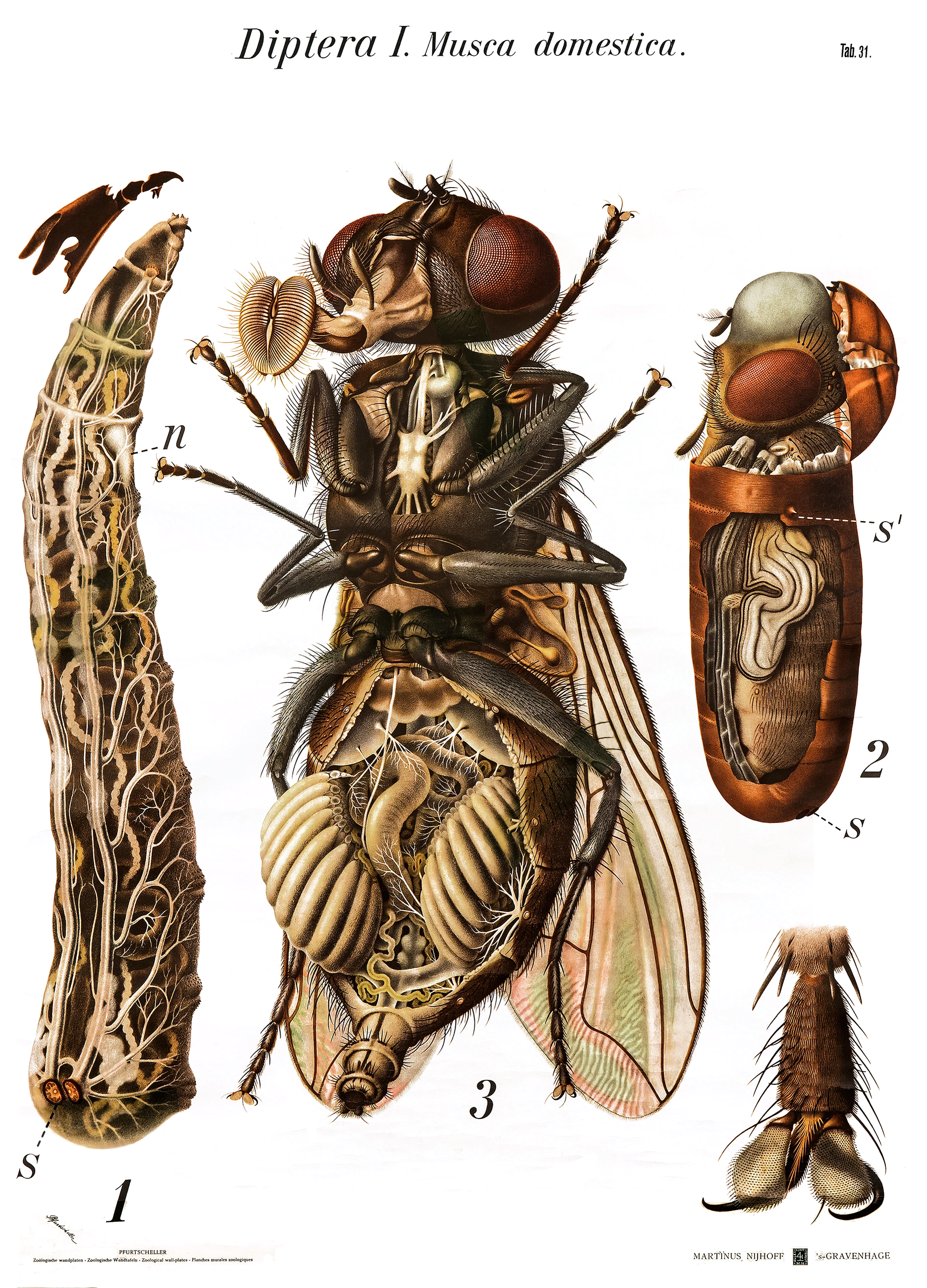
Anatomy

Though the order of flies (Diptera) is much older, true houseflies are believed to have evolved in the beginning of the Cenozoic Era. The housefly's superfamily, Muscoidea, is most closely related to the Oestroidea (blow flies, flesh flies and allies), and more distantly to the Hippoboscoidea (louse flies, bat flies and allies). They are thought to have originated in the southern Palearctic region, particularly the Middle East. Because of their close, commensal relationship with humans, they probably owe their worldwide dispersal to co-migration with humans.

The housefly was first described as Musca domestica in 1758 based on the common European specimens by the Swedish botanist and zoologist Carl Linnaeus in his Systema naturae and continues to be classified under that name. A more detailed description was given in 1776 by the Danish entomologist Johan Christian Fabricius in his Genera Insectorum.

== Life cycle ==
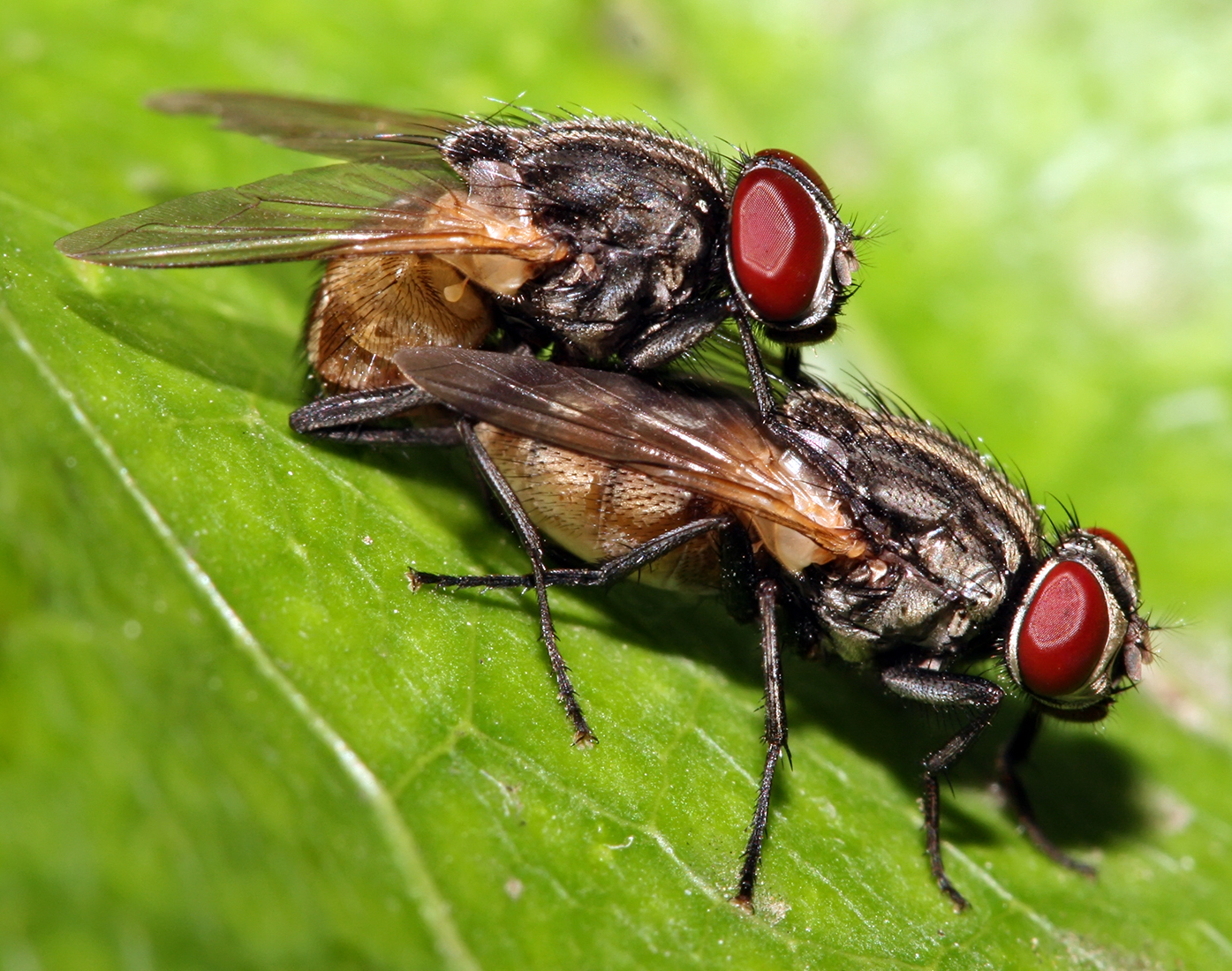
Houseflies mating

Each female housefly can lay up to 500 eggs in her lifetime, in several batches of about 75 to 150. The eggs are white and are about 1.2 mm (1/16 in) in length, and they are deposited by the fly in a suitable place, usually dead and decaying organic matter, such as food waste, carrion, or feces. Within a day, larvae (maggots) hatch from the eggs; they live and feed where they were laid. They are pale-whitish, 3 to 9 mm (1/8 to 11/32 in) long, thinner at the mouth end, and legless. Larval development takes from two weeks, under optimal conditions, to 30 days or more in cooler conditions. The larvae avoid light; the interiors of heaps of animal manure provide nutrient-rich sites and ideal growing conditions: warm, moist, and dark.

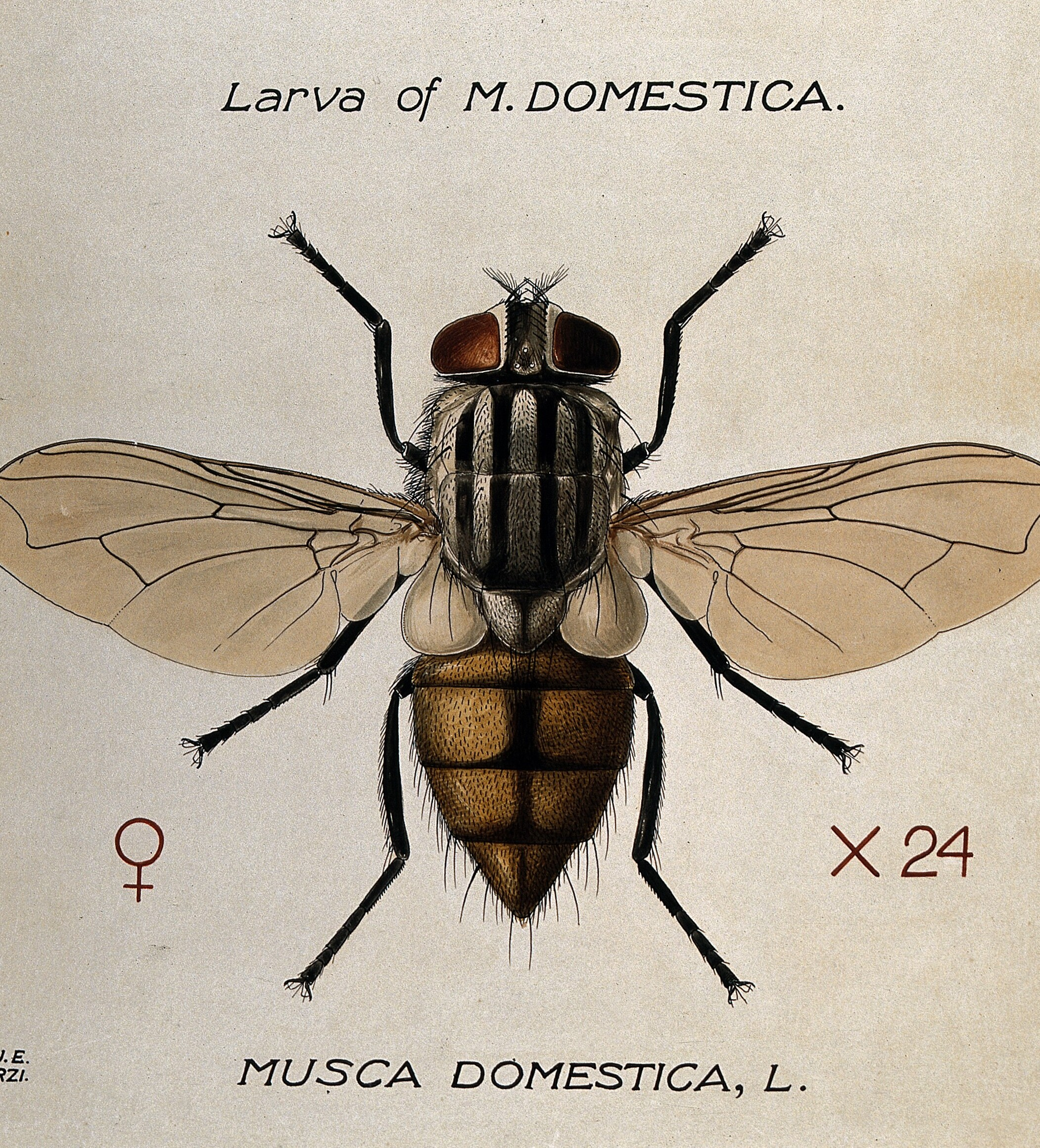
Housefly larva and adult, by Amedeo John Engel Terzi (1872–1956)

At the end of their third instar, the larvae crawl to a dry, cool place and transform into pupae. The pupal case is cylindrical with rounded ends, about 8 mm (5/16 in) long, and formed from the last shed larval skin. It is yellowish at first, darkening through red and brown to nearly black as it ages. Pupae complete their development in two to six days at 35 °C (95 °F), but may take 20 days or more at 14 °C (57 °F).

When metamorphosis is complete, the adult housefly emerges from the pupa. To do this, it uses the ptilinum, an eversible pouch on its head, to tear open the end of the pupal case. Having emerged from the pupa, it ceases to grow; a small fly is not necessarily a young fly, but is instead the result of getting insufficient food during the larval stage.

Male houseflies are sexually mature after 16 hours and females after 24. Females produce a pheromone, (Z)-9-tricosene (muscalure). This cuticular hydrocarbon is not released into the air and males sense it only on contact with females; it has found use in pest control, for luring males to fly traps. The male initiates the mating by bumping into the female, in the air or on the ground, known as a "strike". He climbs on to her thorax, and if she is receptive, a courtship period follows, in which the female vibrates her wings and the male strokes her head. The male then reverses onto her abdomen and the female pushes her ovipositor into his genital opening; copulation, with sperm transfer, lasts for several minutes. Females normally mate only once and then reject further advances from males, while males mate multiple times. A volatile semiochemical that is deposited by females on their eggs attracts other gravid females and leads to clustered egg deposition.

The larvae depend on warmth and sufficient moisture to develop; generally, the warmer the temperature, the faster they grow. In general, fresh swine and chicken manures present the best conditions for the developing larvae, reducing the larval period and increasing the size of the pupae. Cattle, goat, and horse manures produce fewer, smaller pupae, while mature swine manure composted with water content under 30%, approached 100% mortality of the larvae. Pupae can range from about 8–20 milligrams (0.12–0.31 gr) in weight under different conditions.

The life cycle can be completed in seven to ten days under optimal conditions, but may take up to two months in adverse circumstances. In temperate regions, 12 generations may occur per year, and in the tropics and subtropics, more than 20.

== Ecology ==
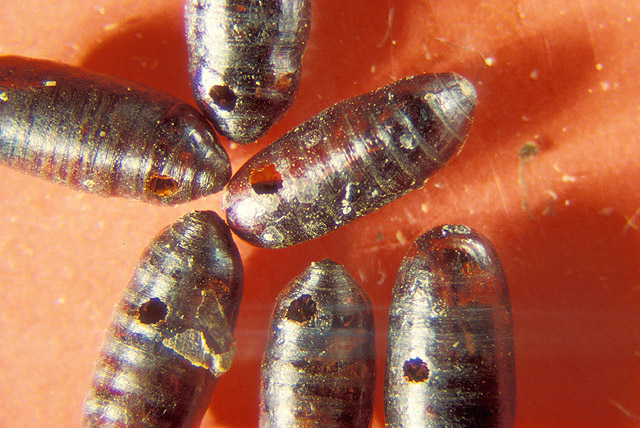
Housefly pupae killed by parasitoid wasp larvae: Each pupa has one hole through which a single adult wasp has emerged; the wasp larvae fed on the housefly larvae.

Houseflies play an important ecological role in breaking down and recycling organic matter. Adults are mainly carnivorous; their primary food is animal matter, carrion, and feces, but they also consume milk, sugary substances, and rotting fruit and vegetables. Solid foods are softened with saliva before being sucked up. They can be opportunistic blood feeders. Houseflies have a mutualistic relationship with the bacterium Klebsiella oxytoca, which can live on the surface of housefly eggs and deter fungi which compete with the housefly larvae for nutrients.

Adult houseflies are diurnal and rest at night. If inside a building after dark, they tend to congregate on ceilings, beams, and overhead wires, while out of doors, they crawl into foliage or long grass, or rest in shrubs and trees or on wires. In cooler climates, some houseflies hibernate in winter, choosing to do so in cracks and crevices, gaps in woodwork, and the folds of curtains. They arouse in the spring when the weather warms up, and search out a place to lay their eggs.

Houseflies have many predators, including birds, reptiles, amphibians, various insects, and spiders. The eggs, larvae, and pupae have many species of stage-specific parasites and parasitoids. Some of the more important are the parasitic wasps Muscidifurax uniraptor and Spalangia cameroni; these lay their eggs in the housefly larvae tissue and their offspring complete their development before the adult houseflies can emerge from the pupae. Hister beetles feed on housefly larvae in manure heaps and the predatory mite Macrocheles muscae domesticae consumes housefly eggs, each mite eating 20 eggs per day.

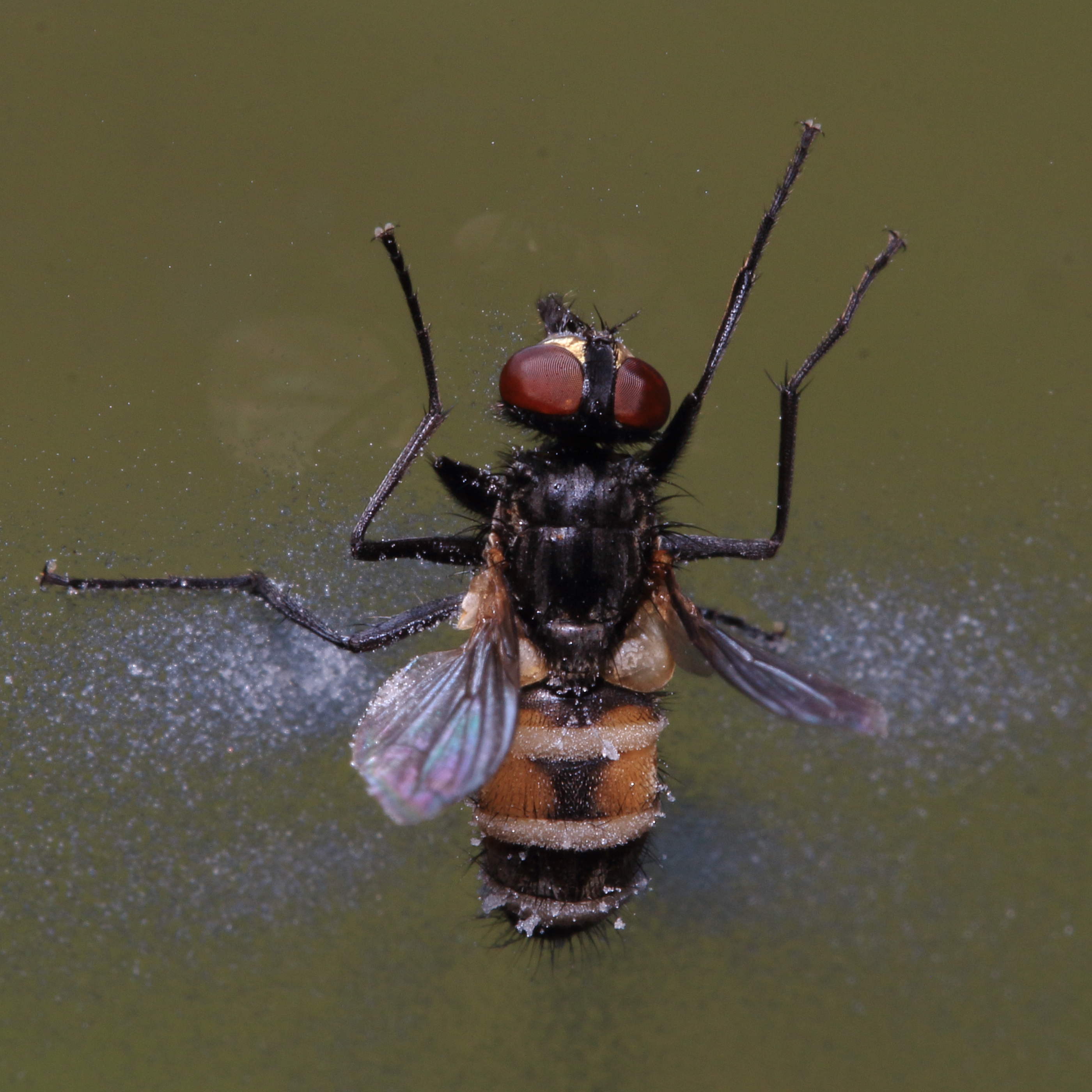
Housefly killed by the pathogenic fungus Entomophthora muscae

Houseflies sometimes carry phoretic (nonparasitic) passengers, including mites such as Macrocheles muscaedomesticae and the pseudoscorpion Lamprochernes chyzeri.

The pathogenic fungus Entomophthora muscae causes a fatal disease in houseflies. After infection, the fungal hyphae grow throughout the body, killing the housefly in about five days. Infected houseflies have been known to seek high temperatures that could suppress the growth of the fungus. Affected females tend to be more attractive to males, but the fungus-host interactions have not been fully understood. The housefly also acts as the alternative host to the parasitic nematode Habronema muscae that attacks horses. A virus that causes enlargement of the salivary glands, salivary gland hypertrophy virus (SGHV), is spread among houseflies through contact with food and infected female houseflies become sterile.

== Relationship with humans ==
Houseflies are often considered a nuisance, disturbing people while at leisure and at work, but they are disliked principally because of their habits of contaminating foodstuffs. They alternate between breeding and feeding in dirty places with feeding on human foods, during which process they soften the food with saliva and deposit their feces, creating a health hazard. However, housefly larvae are as nutritious as fish meal, and could be used to convert waste to insect-based animal feed for farmed fish and livestock. Housefly larvae have been used in traditional cures since the Ming period in China (1386 AD) for a range of medical conditions and have been considered as a useful source of chitosan, with antioxidant properties, and possibly other proteins and polysaccharides of medical value.

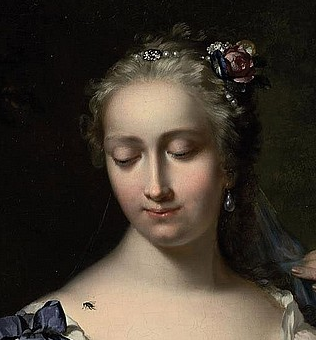
Detail of a 1742 painting by Frans van der Mijn with a Musca depicta

Houseflies have been used in art and artifacts in many cultures. In 16th- and 17th-century European vanitas paintings, houseflies sometimes occur as memento mori. These depictions, Musca depicta, are also used for other effects as in the Flemish painting, the Master of Frankfurt (1496). Housefly amulets were popular in ancient Egypt.

=== As a disease vector ===
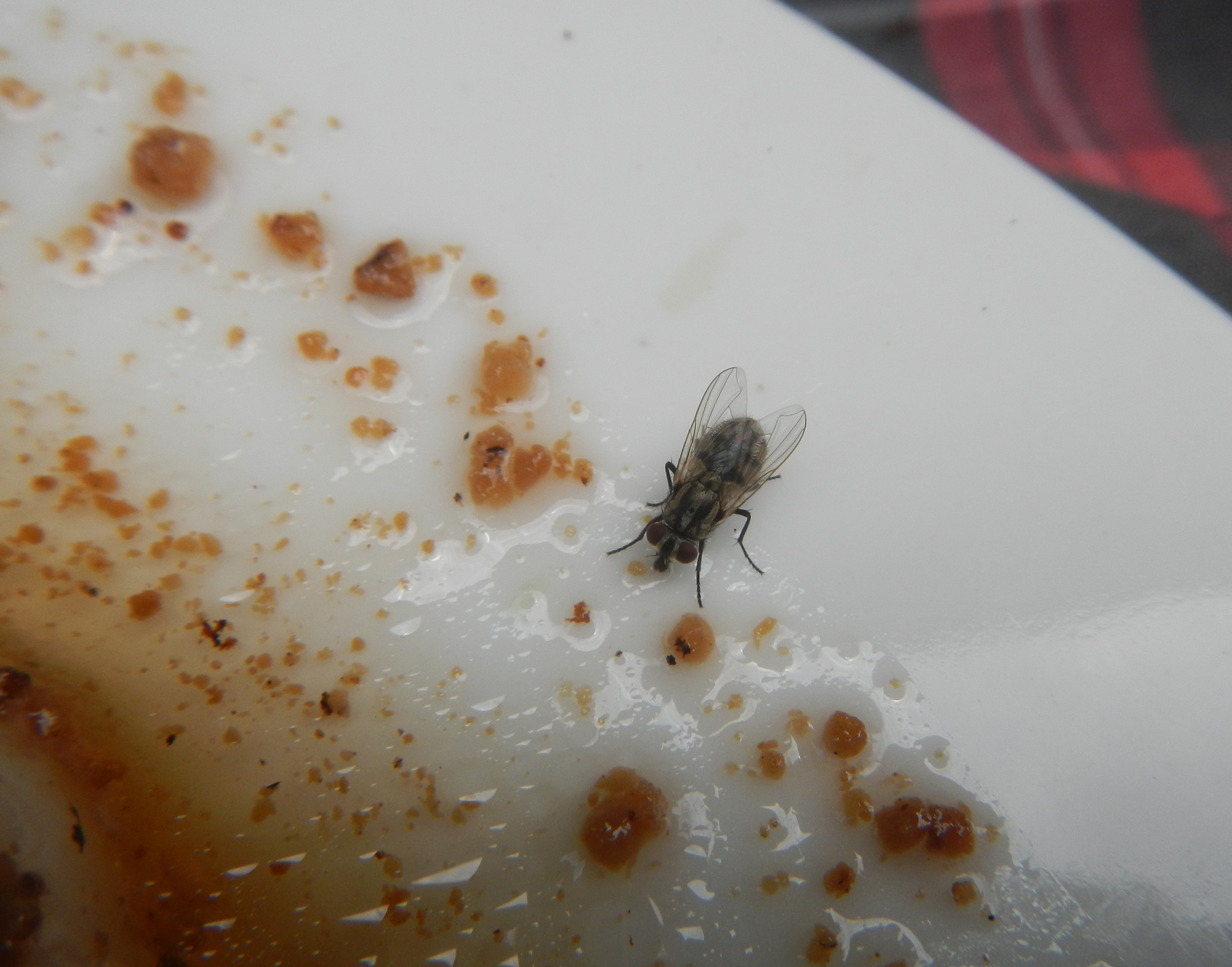
Housefly lapping up food from a plate

Houseflies can fly for several kilometers from their breeding places, carrying a wide variety of organisms on their hairs, mouthparts, vomitus, and feces. Parasites carried include cysts of protozoa, e.g. Entamoeba histolytica and Giardia lamblia and eggs of helminths; e.g., Ascaris lumbricoides, Trichuris trichiura, Hymenolepis nana, and Enterobius vermicularis. Houseflies do not serve as a secondary host or act as a reservoir of any bacteria of medical or veterinary importance, but they do serve as mechanical vectors to over 100 pathogens, such as those causing typhoid, cholera, salmonellosis, bacillary dysentery, tuberculosis, anthrax, ophthalmia, and pyogenic cocci, making them especially problematic in hospitals and during outbreaks of certain diseases. Disease-causing organisms on the outer surface of the housefly may survive for a few hours, but those in the crop or gut can be viable for several days. Usually, too few bacteria are on the external surface of the houseflies (except perhaps for Shigella) to cause infection, so the main routes to human infection are through the housefly's regurgitation and defecation. A number of bacterial endosymbionts have however been detected in sequence-based identification from whole genome sequences extracted from flies, the greatest numbers being detected in the abdomen.

In the early 20th century, Canadian public health workers believed that the control of houseflies was important in controlling the spread of tuberculosis. A "swat that fly" contest was held for children in Montreal in 1912. Houseflies were targeted in 1916, when a polio epidemic broke out in the eastern United States. The belief that housefly control was the key to disease control continued, with extensive use of insecticidal spraying well until the mid-1950s, declining only after the introduction of Salk's vaccine. In China, Mao Zedong's Four Pests Campaign between 1958 and 1962 exhorted the people to catch and kill houseflies, along with rats, mosquitoes, and sparrows.

=== In warfare ===
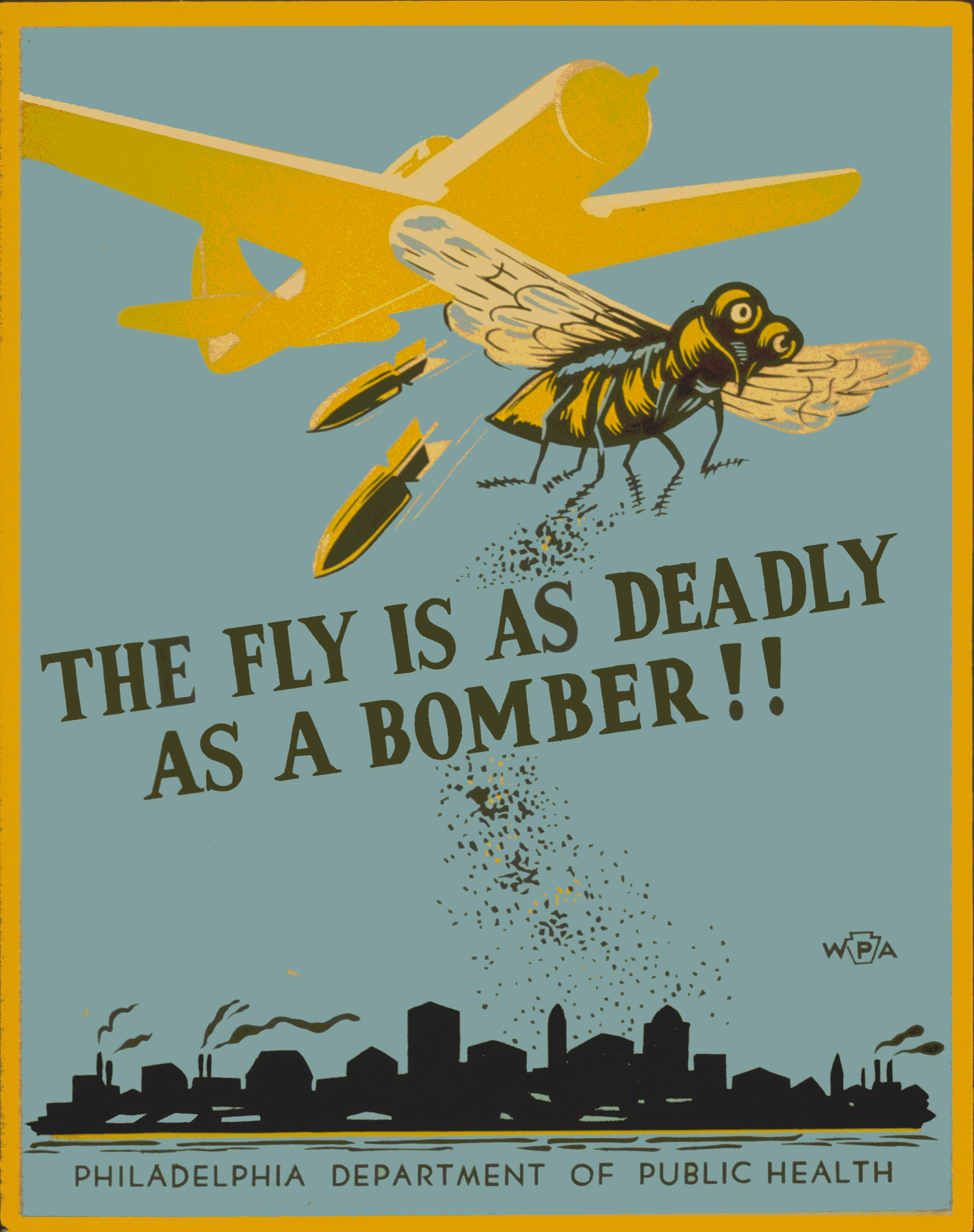
Philadelphia Department of Health poster warning the public of housefly hazards (c. 1942)

During the Second World War, the Japanese worked on entomological warfare techniques under Shirō Ishii. Japanese Yagi bombs developed at Pingfan consisted of two compartments, one with houseflies and another with a bacterial slurry that coated the houseflies prior to release. Vibrio cholerae, which causes cholera, was the bacterium of choice, and was used by Japan against the Chinese in Baoshan in 1942, and in northern Shandong in 1943. The Baoshan bombing produced epidemics that killed 60,000 people in the initial stages, reaching a radius of 200 kilometres (120 mi) which finally took a toll of 200,000 victims. The Shandong attack killed 210,000; the occupying Japanese troops had been vaccinated in advance.

=== In waste management ===
The ability of housefly larvae to feed and develop in a wide range of decaying organic matter is important for recycling of nutrients in nature. This could be exploited to combat ever-increasing amounts of waste. Housefly larvae can be mass-reared in a controlled manner in animal manure, reducing the bulk of waste and minimizing environmental risks of its disposal. Harvested maggots may be used as feed for animal nutrition.

=== Control ===
Houseflies can be controlled, at least to some extent, by physical, chemical, or biological means. Physical controls include screening with small mesh or the use of vertical strips of plastic or strings of beads in doorways to prevent entry of houseflies into buildings. Fans to create air movement or air barriers in doorways can deter houseflies from entering, and food premises often use fly-killing devices; sticky fly papers hanging from the ceiling are effective, but electric "bug zappers" should not be used directly above food-handling areas because of scattering of contaminated insect parts. Another approach is the elimination as far as possible of potential breeding sites. Keeping garbage in lidded containers and collecting it regularly and frequently, prevents any eggs laid from developing into adults. Unhygienic rubbish tips are a prime housefly-breeding site, but if garbage is covered by a layer of soil, preferably daily, this can be avoided.

Insecticides can be used. Larvicides kill the developing larvae, but large quantities may need to be used to reach areas below the surface. Aerosols can be used in buildings to "zap" houseflies, but outside applications are only temporarily effective. Residual sprays on walls or resting sites have a longer-lasting effect. Many strains of housefly have become immune to the most commonly used insecticides. Resistance to carbamates and organophosphates is conferred by variation in acetylcholinesterase genes. M. domestica has achieved a high degree of resistance. Resistance monitoring is vital to avoid continued use of ineffective active ingredients such as found in the notably severe example of Freeman et al 2019 in Kansas and Maryland, USA.

Several means of biological pest control have been investigated. These include the introduction of another species, the black soldier fly (Hermetia illucens), whose larvae compete with those of the housefly for resources. The introduction of dung beetles to churn up the surface of a manure heap and render it unsuitable for breeding is another approach. Augmentative biological control by releasing parasitoids can be used, but houseflies breed so fast that the natural enemies are unable to keep up.

=== In science ===
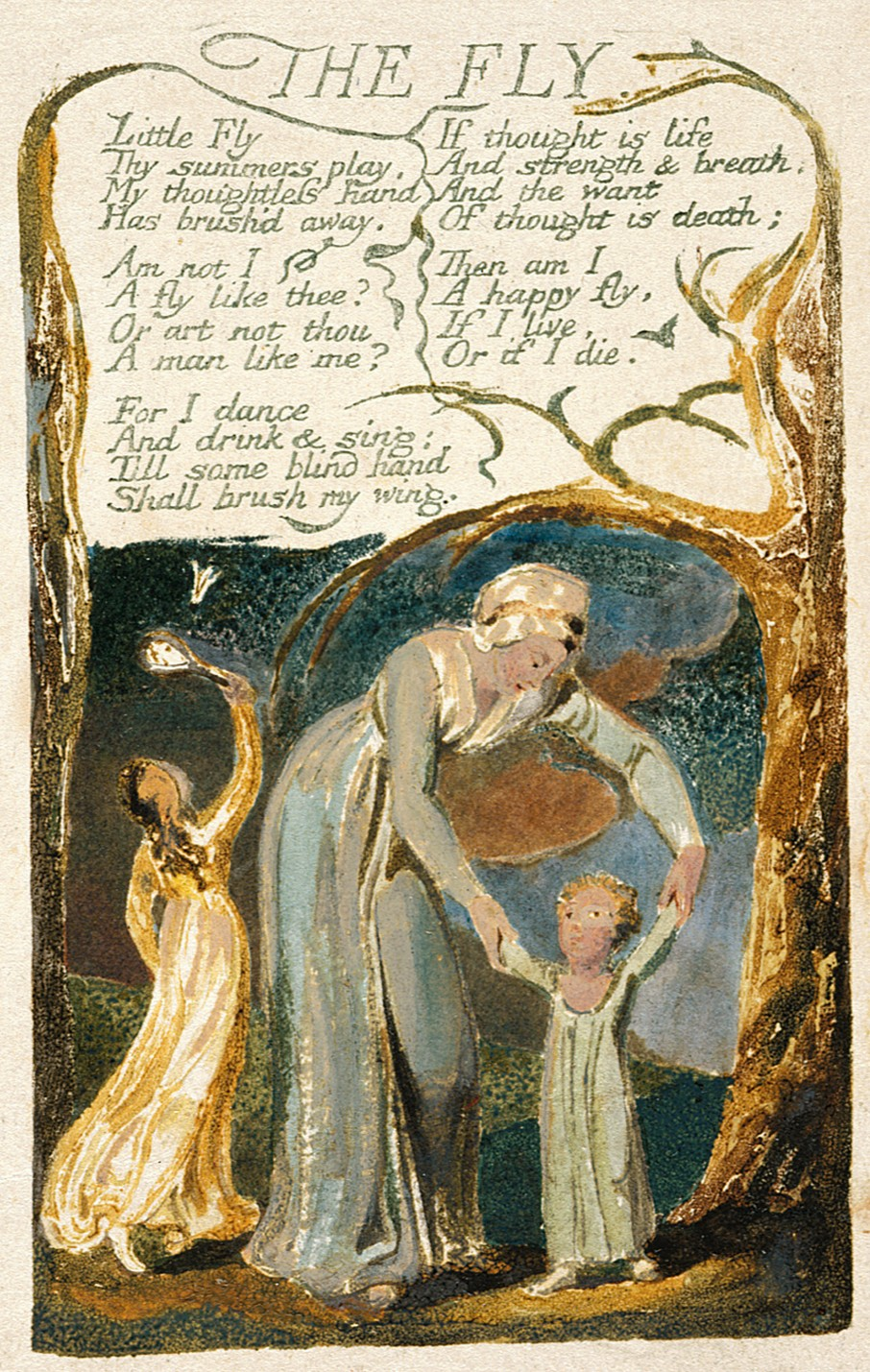
William Blake's illustration of "The Fly" in Songs of Innocence and of Experience (1794)

The ease of culturing houseflies, and the relative ease of handling them when compared to the fruit fly Drosophila, have made them useful as model organism for use in laboratories. The American entomologist Vincent Dethier, in his humorous To Know A Fly (1962), pointed out that as a laboratory animal, houseflies did not trouble anyone sensitive to animal cruelty. Houseflies have a small number of chromosomes, haploid 6 or diploid 12. Because the somatic tissue of the housefly consists of long-lived postmitotic cells, it can be used as an informative model system for understanding cumulative age-related cellular alterations. Oxidative DNA damage 8-hydroxydeoxyguanosine in houseflies was found in one study to increase with age and reduce life expectancy supporting the hypothesis that oxidative molecular damage is a causal factor in senescence (aging).

The housefly is an object of biological research, partly for its variable sex-determination mechanism. Although a wide variety of sex-determination mechanisms exists in nature (e.g. male and female heterogamy, haplodiploidy, environmental factors), the way sex is determined is usually fixed within a species. The housefly is, however, thought to exhibit multiple mechanisms for sex determination, such as male heterogamy (like most insects and mammals), female heterogamy (like birds), and maternal control over offspring sex. This is because a male-determining gene (Mdmd) can be found on most or all housefly chromosomes. Sexual differentiation is controlled, as in other insects, by an ancient developmental switch, doublesex, which is regulated by the transformer protein in many different insects. Mdmd causes male development by negatively regulating transformer. There is also a female-determining allele of transformer that is not sensitive to the negative regulation of Mdmd.

The antimicrobial peptides produced by housefly maggots are of pharmacological interest.

In the 1970s, the aircraft modeler Frank Ehling constructed miniature balsa-wood aircraft powered by live houseflies. Studies of tethered houseflies have helped in the understanding of insect vision, sensory perception, and flight control.

=== In literature ===
The Impertinent Insect is a group of five fables, sometimes ascribed to Aesop, concerning an insect, in one version a fly, which puffs itself up to seem important. In the Biblical fourth plague of Egypt, flies represent death and decay, while the Philistine god Beelzebub's name may mean "lord of the flies". In Greek mythology, Myiagros was a god who chased away flies during the sacrifices to Zeus and Athena; Zeus sent a fly to bite Pegasus, causing Bellerophon to fall back to Earth when he attempted to ride the winged steed to Mount Olympus. In the traditional Navajo religion, Big Fly is an important spirit being.

William Blake's 1794 poem "The Fly", part of his collection Songs of Experience, deals with the insect's mortality, subject to uncontrollable circumstances, just like humans. Emily Dickinson's 1855 poem "I Heard a Fly Buzz When I Died" speaks of flies in the context of death. In William Golding's 1954 novel Lord of the Flies, the fly is, however, a symbol of the children involved.

Ogden Nash's humorous two-line 1942 poem "God in His wisdom made the fly/And then forgot to tell us why." indicates the debate about the value of biodiversity, given that even those considered by humans as pests have their place in the world's ecosystems.
