= Glyptholaspis fimicola =

Scientific classification
- Kingdom: Animalia
- Phylum: Arthropoda
- Subphylum: Chelicerata
- Class: Arachnida
- Order: Mesostigmata
- Family: Macrochelidae
- Genus: Glyptholaspis
- Species: G. fimicola

Binomial name
- Glyptholaspis fimicola (Sellnick, 1931)

Species of mite

Glyptholaspis fimicola is a species of mite in the family Macrochelidae.
