= Geholaspis berlesei =

Scientific classification
- Kingdom: Animalia
- Phylum: Arthropoda
- Subphylum: Chelicerata
- Class: Arachnida
- Order: Mesostigmata
- Family: Macrochelidae
- Genus: Geholaspis
- Species: G. berlesei

Binomial name
- Geholaspis berlesei Valle, 1953

Species of mite

Geholaspis berlesei is a species of mite in the family Macrochelidae.
