= Geholaspis hortorum =

Scientific classification
- Kingdom: Animalia
- Phylum: Arthropoda
- Subphylum: Chelicerata
- Class: Arachnida
- Order: Mesostigmata
- Family: Macrochelidae
- Genus: Geholaspis
- Species: G. hortorum

Binomial name
- Geholaspis hortorum (Berlese, 1918)

Species of mite

Geholaspis hortorum is a species of mite in the family Macrochelidae, recorded in Germany and Finland, Europe.
