= Neopodocinum subjaspersi =

Scientific classification
- Kingdom: Animalia
- Phylum: Arthropoda
- Subphylum: Chelicerata
- Class: Arachnida
- Order: Mesostigmata
- Family: Macrochelidae
- Genus: Neopodocinum
- Species: N. subjaspersi

Binomial name
- Neopodocinum subjaspersi Hartini & Takaku, 2003

Species of mite

Neopodocinum subjaspersi is a species of mite in the family Macrochelidae.
