= Macrocheles muscaedomesticae =

Scientific classification
- Kingdom: Animalia
- Phylum: Arthropoda
- Subphylum: Chelicerata
- Class: Arachnida
- Order: Mesostigmata
- Family: Macrochelidae
- Genus: Macrocheles
- Species: M. muscaedomesticae

Binomial name
- Macrocheles muscaedomesticae (Scopoli, 1772)

Species of mite

Macrocheles muscaedomesticae is a species of mite in the family Macrochelidae. It has a cosmopolitan distribution.

This mite species feeds on flies in their egg, larval and (possibly) adult stages, and also attaches to adult flies for dispersal (phoresis). Its hosts include houseflies (Musca domestica), drosophilid flies (Drosophila hydei) and stable flies (Stomoxys calcitrans).
