= Venatiolaspis =

Scientific classification
- Kingdom: Animalia
- Phylum: Arthropoda
- Subphylum: Chelicerata
- Class: Arachnida
- Order: Mesostigmata
- Family: Macrochelidae
- Genus: Venatiolaspis van Driel & Loots, 1975

Genus of mites

Venatiolaspis is a genus of mites in the family Macrochelidae.
