= Trigonholaspis trigonarum =

Scientific classification
- Kingdom: Animalia
- Phylum: Arthropoda
- Subphylum: Chelicerata
- Class: Arachnida
- Order: Mesostigmata
- Family: Macrochelidae
- Genus: Trigonholaspis
- Species: T. trigonarum

Binomial name
- Trigonholaspis trigonarum Vitzthum, 1930

Species of mite

Trigonholaspis trigonarum is a species of mite in the family Macrochelidae.
