= Ancistrocheles =

Scientific classification
- Kingdom: Animalia
- Phylum: Arthropoda
- Subphylum: Chelicerata
- Class: Arachnida
- Order: Mesostigmata
- Family: Macrochelidae
- Genus: Ancistrocheles; Krantz, 1962

Genus of mites

Ancistrocheles is a genus of mites in the family Macrochelidae.
