= Holostaspella exornata =

Scientific classification
- Kingdom: Animalia
- Phylum: Arthropoda
- Subphylum: Chelicerata
- Class: Arachnida
- Order: Mesostigmata
- Family: Macrochelidae
- Genus: Holostaspella
- Species: H. exornata

Binomial name
- Holostaspella exornata Filipponi & Pegazzano, 1967

Species of mite

Holostaspella exornata is a species of mite in the family Macrochelidae. Recorded in Finland
