= Holostaspella moderata =

Scientific classification
- Kingdom: Animalia
- Phylum: Arthropoda
- Subphylum: Chelicerata
- Class: Arachnida
- Order: Mesostigmata
- Family: Macrochelidae
- Genus: Holostaspella
- Species: H. moderata

Binomial name
- Holostaspella moderata Berlese, 1920

Species of mite

Holostaspella moderata is a species of mite in the family Macrochelidae.
