= Cophrolaspis =

Scientific classification
- Kingdom: Animalia
- Phylum: Arthropoda
- Subphylum: Chelicerata
- Class: Arachnida
- Order: Mesostigmata
- Family: Macrochelidae
- Genus: Cophrolaspis; Berlese, 1918

Genus of mites

Cophrolaspis is a genus of mites in the family Macrochelidae.
