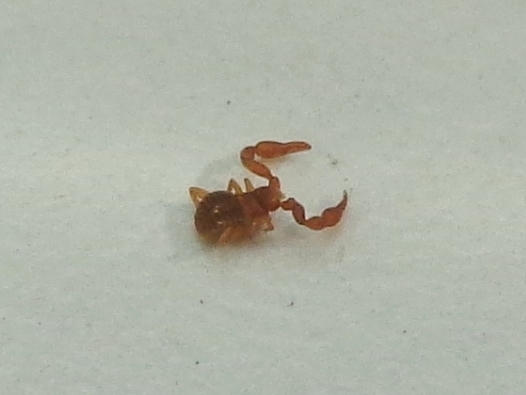

Scientific classification
- Kingdom: Animalia
- Phylum: Arthropoda
- Subphylum: Chelicerata
- Class: Arachnida
- Order: Pseudoscorpiones
- Family: Chernetidae
- Genus: Lamprochernes
- Species: L. chyzeri

Binomial name
- Lamprochernes chyzeri Tömösváry, 1882

= Lamprochernes chyzeri =

Species of pseudoscorpion

Lamprochernes chyzeri, also known as Chyzer’s shining claw, is a species of pseudoscorpion in the family Chernetidae. Its range covers most of Europe, including Sweden, Finland, Norway, England, Hungary, Romania and Yugoslavia. It is a phoretic passenger of the housefly.
