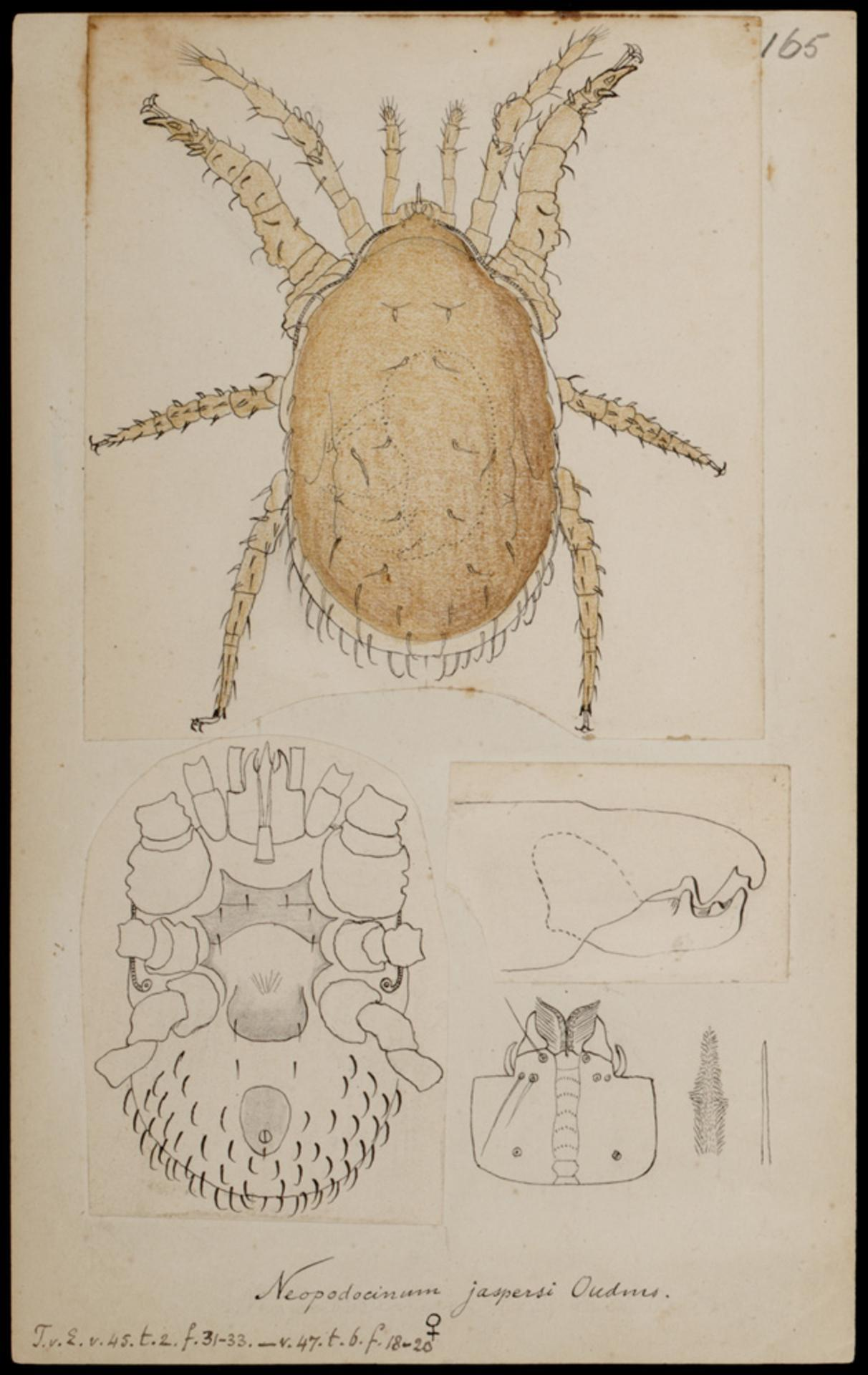
- Neopodocinum jaspersi (Oudemans)

Scientific classification
- Kingdom: Animalia
- Phylum: Arthropoda
- Subphylum: Chelicerata
- Class: Arachnida
- Order: Mesostigmata
- Family: Macrochelidae
- Genus: Neopodocinum; Oudemans, 1902

= Neopodocinum =

Genus of mites

Neopodocinum is a genus of mites in the family Macrochelidae. There are about six described species in Neopodocinum.

== Species ==
These six species belong to the genus Neopodocinum:

- Neopodocinum caputmedusae (Berlese, 1908)
- Neopodocinum halimunensis Hartini & Takaku, 2003
- Neopodocinum kalimantanense Hartini & Takaku, 2004
- Neopodocinum meridionalis Selin, 1931
- Neopodocinum mrciaki Selinick, 1968
- Neopodocinum subjaspersi Hartini & Takaku, 2003
