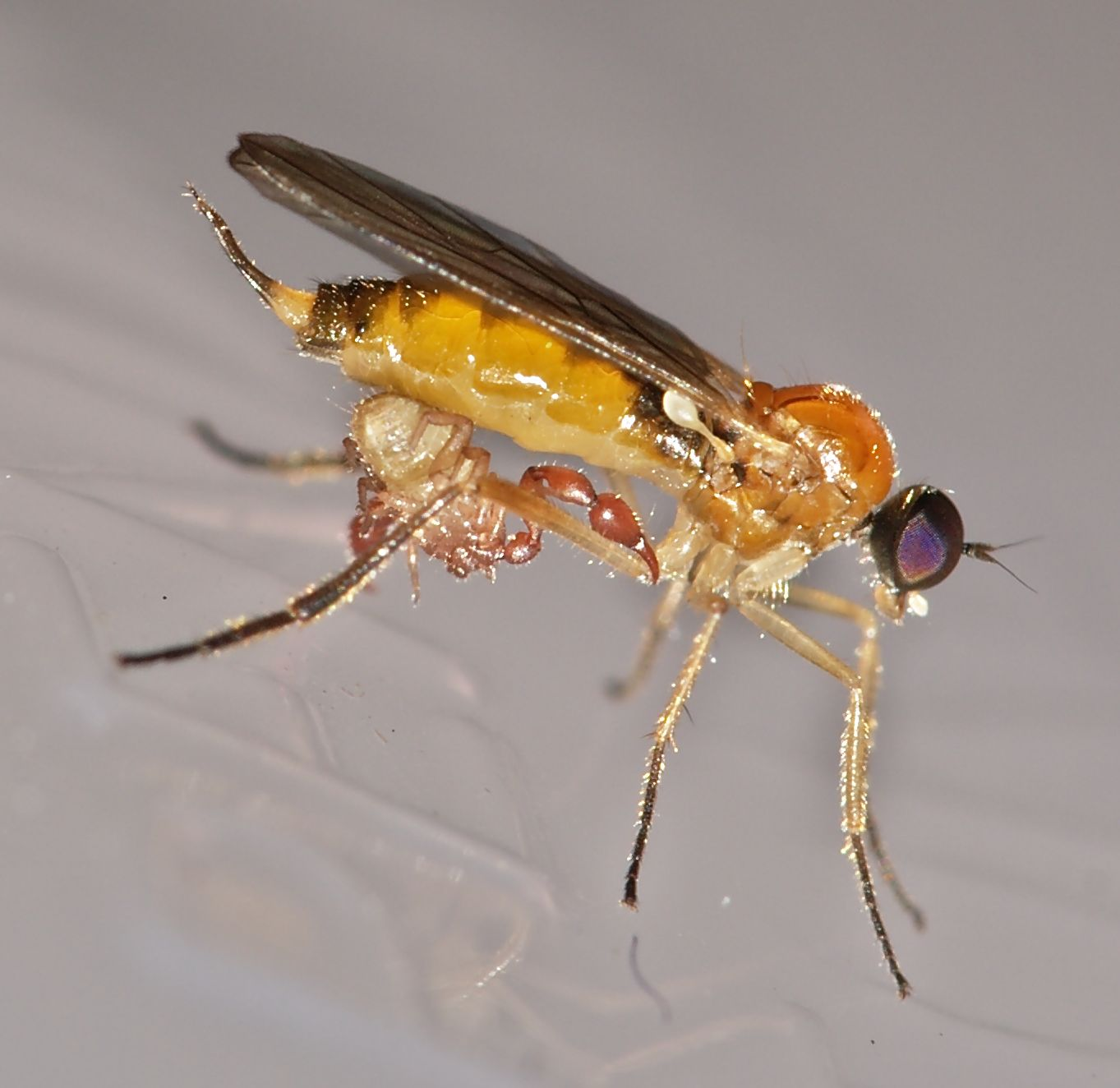
- Leptopeza flavipes (Hybotidae), with "blind passenger" pseudoscorpion Lamprochernes sp. in Cologne, Germany.

Scientific classification
- Domain: Eukaryota
- Kingdom: Animalia
- Phylum: Arthropoda
- Subphylum: Chelicerata
- Class: Arachnida
- Order: Pseudoscorpiones
- Family: Chernetidae
- Subfamily: Lamprochernetinae
- Genus: Lamprochernes; Tömösváry, 1882

= Lamprochernes =

Genus of pseudoscorpions

Lamprochernes is a genus of pseudoscorpions in the family Chernetidae.

== Species ==
Lamprochernes contains the following species

- Lamprochernes chyzeri – Chyzer's shining claw
- Lamprochernes foxi
- Lamprochernes indicus
- Lamprochernes leptaleus
- Lamprochernes minor
- Lamprochernes moreoticus
- Lamprochernes muscivorus
- Lamprochernes nodosus
- Lamprochernes procer
- Lamprochernes savignyi
