= Tricholaspis =

Scientific classification
- Kingdom: Animalia
- Phylum: Arthropoda
- Subphylum: Chelicerata
- Class: Arachnida
- Order: Mesostigmata
- Family: Macrochelidae
- Genus: Tricholaspis; Evans, 1956

Genus of mites

Tricholaspis is a genus of mites in the family Macrochelidae.
