= Geholaspis aeneus =

Scientific classification
- Kingdom: Animalia
- Phylum: Arthropoda
- Subphylum: Chelicerata
- Class: Arachnida
- Order: Mesostigmata
- Family: Macrochelidae
- Genus: Geholaspis
- Species: G. aeneus

Binomial name
- Geholaspis aeneus Kraus, 1970

Species of mite

Geholaspis aeneus is a species of mite in the family Macrochelidae, recorded in The Netherlands, Europe.
