= Beaurieuia =

Scientific classification
- Kingdom: Animalia
- Phylum: Arthropoda
- Subphylum: Chelicerata
- Class: Arachnida
- Order: Mesostigmata
- Family: Macrochelidae
- Genus: Beaurieuia; Oudemans, 1929

Genus of mites

Beaurieuia is a genus of mites in the family Macrochelidae.

This genus was formerly in the family Pachylaelapidae.
