= Lamprochernes nodosus =

Scientific classification
- Kingdom: Animalia
- Phylum: Arthropoda
- Subphylum: Chelicerata
- Class: Arachnida
- Order: Pseudoscorpiones
- Family: Chernetidae
- Genus: Lamprochernes
- Species: L. nodosus

Binomial name
- Lamprochernes nodosus (Schrank, 1803)

Synonyms
- Chelifer nodosus Schrank, 1803

Species of pseudoscorpion

Lamprochernes nodosus is a species of arachnid belonging to the family Chernetidae.

It is native to Europe. Both sexes are known to engage in phoresy, clinging to other arthropods such as harvestmen and flies.
