= Padhuis =

Place in Drenthe, Netherlands

- Hamlet
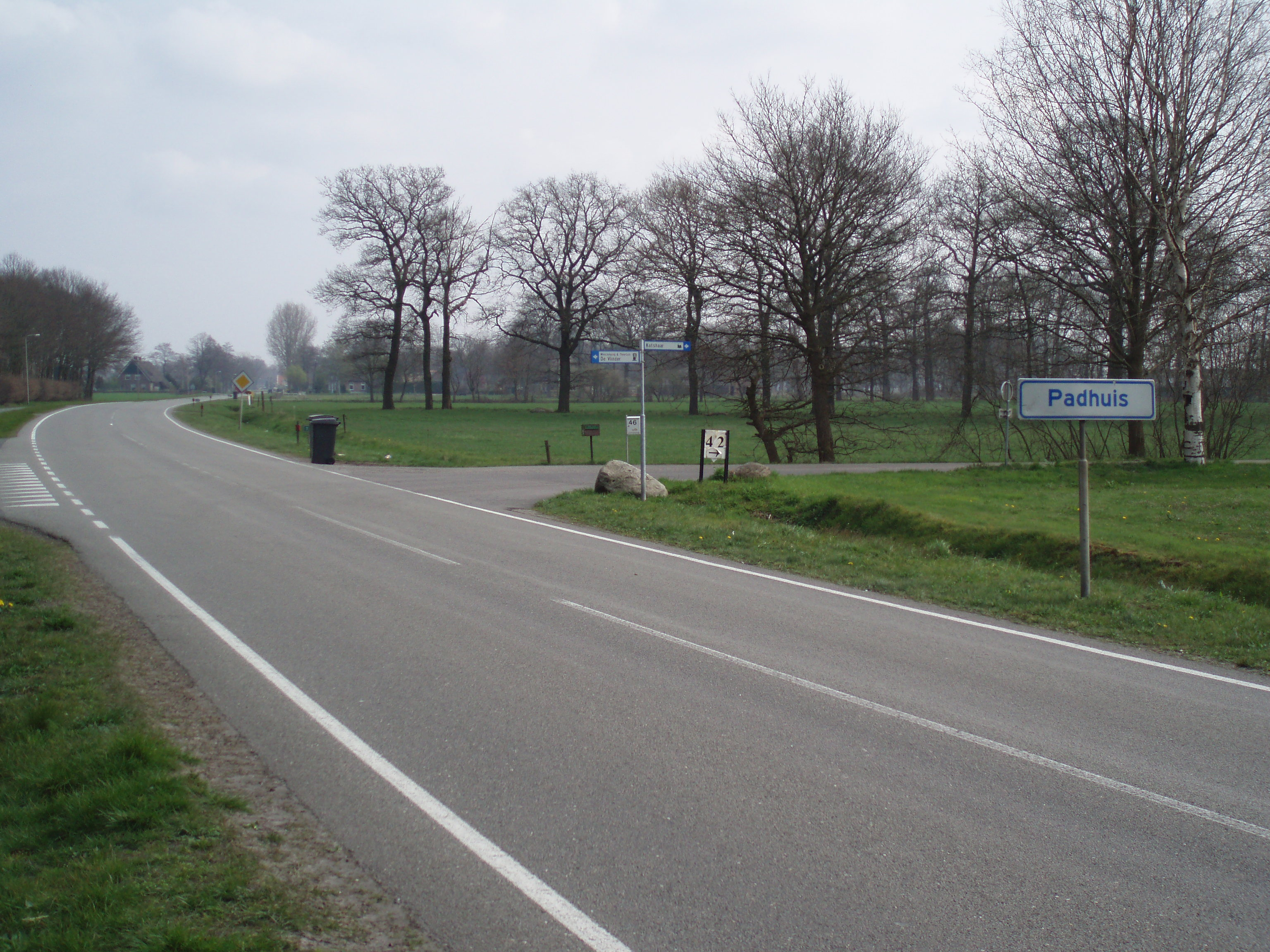
- Entering Padhuis (Place name sign on the Europaweg)

- Location within Drenthe Location within Netherlands
- Coordinates: 52°39′40″N 6°50′55″E
- Country: Netherlands
- Province: Drenthe
- Municipality: Coevorden

Area
  - Total: 6.59 km^{2} (2.54 sq mi)
- Elevation: 10 m (33 ft)

Population (2021)
  - Total: 120
  - Density: 18/km^{2} (47/sq mi)
- Time zone: UTC+1 (CET)
  - Summer (DST): UTC+2 (CEST)
- Postal code: 7742
- Dialing code: 0592

Padhuis (Low German: Pathuus) is a hamlet in the Netherlands and is part of the Coevorden municipality in Drenthe.

Padhuis has a joint statistical listing with Vlieghuis, but the postal authorities have placed it under Coevorden. It was first mentioned in 1276 as "inter domos que dicuntur Venehus et Pathhus", and can either mean "house on a path" or "house near a swamp". In 1840, it was home to 34 people. There are 5 oil wells in the hamlet.
