= Geholaspis mandibularis =

Scientific classification
- Kingdom: Animalia
- Phylum: Arthropoda
- Subphylum: Chelicerata
- Class: Arachnida
- Order: Mesostigmata
- Family: Macrochelidae
- Genus: Geholaspis
- Species: G. mandibularis

Binomial name
- Geholaspis mandibularis (Berlese, 1904)

Species of mite

Geholaspis mandibularis is a species of mite in the family Macrochelidae. It is found in Europe.
