= Neopodocinum caputmedusae =

Scientific classification
- Kingdom: Animalia
- Phylum: Arthropoda
- Subphylum: Chelicerata
- Class: Arachnida
- Order: Mesostigmata
- Family: Macrochelidae
- Genus: Neopodocinum
- Species: N. caputmedusae

Binomial name
- Neopodocinum caputmedusae (Berlese, 1908)

Species of mite

Neopodocinum caputmedusae is a species of mite in the family Macrochelidae.
