= Habronema =

Scientific classification
- Kingdom: Animalia
- Phylum: Nematoda
- Class: Chromadorea
- Order: Rhabditida
- Family: Habronematidae
- Genus: Habronema; Diesing, 1861

Species
- Habronema avicedae Soota & Dey Sarkar, 1981; Habronema Habronema bialatum; Habronema cameroni Gupta & Kazim, 1979; Habronema clarki Foster & Chitwood, 1937; Habronema colaptes Walton, 1923; Habronema congolense Vuylsteke, 1937; Habronema dipterum Popova, 1927; Habronema ficheuri Seurat, 1916; Habronema irritans (Rivolta, 1884); Habronema khalili Ezzat, 1945; Habronema leptoptera Rudolphi, 1819; Habronema longistoma Vanden-Berghe, 1943; Habronema majus Schneider, 1866; Habronema malani Krecek, 1989; Habronema manidis Vuylsteke, 1936; Habronema mansioni Seurat, 1914; Habronema megastoma Rudolphi, 1819; Habronema microstoma Schneider, 1866; Habronema murrayi Ortlepp, 1934; Habronema muscae Carter, 1861; Habronema numidae Ortlepp, 1938; Habronema spinosa Gendre, 1923; Habronema tomasi Krecek, 1989; Habronema unilateralis Molin, 1860; Habronema whitei Mönnig, 1931; Habronema zebrae Theiler, 1923

Genus of roundworms

Habronema is a genus of nematodes in the order Spirurida.

Species include:

- Habronema clarki – rodent parasite
- Habronema incertum – bird parasite
- Habronema microstoma – parasite of the stomach of horses, can be transmitted by the stable fly
- Habronema muscae – parasite of the stomach of horses
