= Holostaspella scatophila =

Scientific classification
- Kingdom: Animalia
- Phylum: Arthropoda
- Subphylum: Chelicerata
- Class: Arachnida
- Order: Mesostigmata
- Family: Macrochelidae
- Genus: Holostaspella
- Species: H. scatophila

Binomial name
- Holostaspella scatophila Takaku, 1994

Species of mite

Holostaspella scatophila is a species of mite in the family Macrochelidae.
