= Holocelaeno =

Scientific classification
- Kingdom: Animalia
- Phylum: Arthropoda
- Subphylum: Chelicerata
- Class: Arachnida
- Order: Mesostigmata
- Family: Macrochelidae
- Genus: Holocelaeno; Berlese, 1910

Genus of mites

Holocelaeno is a genus of mites in the family Macrochelidae. There are about six described species in Holocelaeno.

== Species ==
These six species belong to the genus Holocelaeno:

- Holocelaeno costai
- Holocelaeno jasius
- Holocelaeno melisi
- Holocelaeno neophanei
- Holocelaeno palaeno
- Holocelaeno singeri
