= Lamprochernes savignyi =

Scientific classification
- Kingdom: Animalia
- Phylum: Arthropoda
- Subphylum: Chelicerata
- Class: Arachnida
- Order: Pseudoscorpiones
- Family: Chernetidae
- Genus: Lamprochernes
- Species: L. savignyi

Binomial name
- Lamprochernes savignyi (Simon, 1881)

Synonyms
- Chelifer savignyi Simon, 1881; Chelifer pygmaeus L.Koch & Keyerling, 1885; Chelifer brevifemoratus Balzan, 1890; Chelifer celerrimus With, 1908; Chelifer (Chernes) godfreyi Kew, 1911; Pycnochernes linsdalei Chamberlin, 1952; Muscichernes katoi Morikawa, 1960

Species of pseudoscorpion

Lamprochernes savignyi is a species of pseudoscorpion in the Chernetidae family. It was described in 1881 by French naturalist Eugène Simon.

== Distribution and habitat ==
The species has a cosmopolitan distribution, inhabiting plant litter. The type locality is Ramleh, Alexandria, Egypt.

== Behaviour ==
The pseudoscorpions are terrestrial predators.
