= Nothrholaspis =

Scientific classification
- Kingdom: Animalia
- Phylum: Arthropoda
- Subphylum: Chelicerata
- Class: Arachnida
- Order: Mesostigmata
- Family: Macrochelidae
- Genus: Nothrholaspis; Berlese, 1918

Genus of mites

Nothrholaspis is a genus of mites in the family Macrochelidae. There are about six described species in Nothrholaspis.

== Species ==
These six species belong to the genus Nothrholaspis:

- Nothrholaspis anatolicus
- Nothrholaspis carinata Berlese, 1918
- Nothrholaspis planus Vitzthum, 1935
- Nothrholaspis saboorii
- Nothrholaspis scutivagus Özbek, 2017
- Nothrholaspis turcicus
