= Geholaspis =

Scientific classification
- Kingdom: Animalia
- Phylum: Arthropoda
- Subphylum: Chelicerata
- Class: Arachnida
- Order: Mesostigmata
- Family: Macrochelidae
- Genus: Geholaspis; A.Berlese, 1918

Genus of mites

Geholaspis is a genus of mites in the family Macrochelidae. There are about 18 described species in Geholaspis.

== Species ==
These 18 species belong to the genus Geholaspis:

- Geholaspis aeneus Kraus, 1970
- Geholaspis alpinus (Berlese, 1887)
- Geholaspis asper (Berlese, 1904)
- Geholaspis berlesei Valle, 1953
- Geholaspis biperforatus Krauss, 1970
- Geholaspis bulgaricus Balogh, 1958
- Geholaspis comelicensis Lombardini, 1962
- Geholaspis foroliviensis Lombardini, 1943
- Geholaspis hortorum (Berlese, 1918)
- Geholaspis ilvana Valle & Mazzoleni, 1967
- Geholaspis lagrecai Valle, 1963
- Geholaspis longisetosus Balogh, 1958
- Geholaspis longispinosus (Kramer, 1876)
- Geholaspis longulus (Berlese, 1887)
- Geholaspis mandibularis (Berlese, 1904)
- Geholaspis pauperior (Berlese, 1918)
- Geholaspis pennulatus
- Geholaspis ponticus Bregetova & Koroleva, 1960
