= Neopodocinum halimunensis =

Scientific classification
- Kingdom: Animalia
- Phylum: Arthropoda
- Subphylum: Chelicerata
- Class: Arachnida
- Order: Mesostigmata
- Family: Macrochelidae
- Genus: Neopodocinum
- Species: N. halimunensis

Binomial name
- Neopodocinum halimunensis Hartini & Takaku, 2003

Species of mite

Neopodocinum halimunensis is a species of mite in the family Macrochelidae.
