= Synaphasis =

Scientific classification
- Kingdom: Animalia
- Phylum: Arthropoda
- Subphylum: Chelicerata
- Class: Arachnida
- Order: Mesostigmata
- Family: Macrochelidae
- Genus: Synaphasis; Krantz, 1961

Genus of mites

Synaphasis is a genus of mites in the family Macrochelidae.
