= Holostaspella =

Scientific classification
- Kingdom: Animalia
- Phylum: Arthropoda
- Subphylum: Chelicerata
- Class: Arachnida
- Order: Mesostigmata
- Family: Macrochelidae
- Genus: Holostaspella; A.Berlese, 1903

Genus of mites

Holostaspella is a genus of mites in the family Macrochelidae. There are about 12 described species in Holostaspella.

== Species ==
These 10 species belong to the genus Holostaspella:

- Holostaspella bidentata Özbek, 2017
- Holostaspella bifoliata Tragrdh, 1952
- Holostaspella exornata Filipponi & Pegazzano, 1967
- Holostaspella katakurai Hartini & Takaku, 2003
- Holostaspella moderata Berlese, 1920
- Holostaspella ornata (Berlese, 1904)
- Holostaspella pentalineatus Krauss, 1970
- Holostaspella scatophila Takaku, 1994
- Holostaspella sklari Bregetova, 1977
- Holostaspella subornata Bregetova & Koroleva, 1960
