= Geholaspis pauperior =

Scientific classification
- Kingdom: Animalia
- Phylum: Arthropoda
- Subphylum: Chelicerata
- Class: Arachnida
- Order: Mesostigmata
- Family: Macrochelidae
- Genus: Geholaspis
- Species: G. pauperior

Binomial name
- Geholaspis pauperior (Berlese, 1918)

Species of mite

Geholaspis pauperior is a species of mite in the family Macrochelidae.
