= Grafia (plant) =

Scientific classification
- Kingdom: Plantae
- Clade: Tracheophytes
- Clade: Angiosperms
- Clade: Eudicots
- Clade: Asterids
- Order: Apiales
- Family: Apiaceae
- Genus: Grafia; Rchb.

Synonyms
- Golatta Raf.; Hladnikia W.D.J.Koch; Malabaila Tausch

Genus of plants

Grafia is a monotypic genus of flowering plants belonging to the family Apiaceae. It only contains one species, Grafia golaka (Hacq.) Rchb.

Its native range is southern central Europe. It is found in the countries of Albania, Italy and Yugoslavia.

It grows on montane meadows.

The genus name of Grafia is in honour of Žiga Graf (1801–1838), German doctor and botanist in Ljubljana. It was first described and published by Ludwig Reichenbach in Handb. Nat. Pfl.-Syst. on page 219 in 1837.
