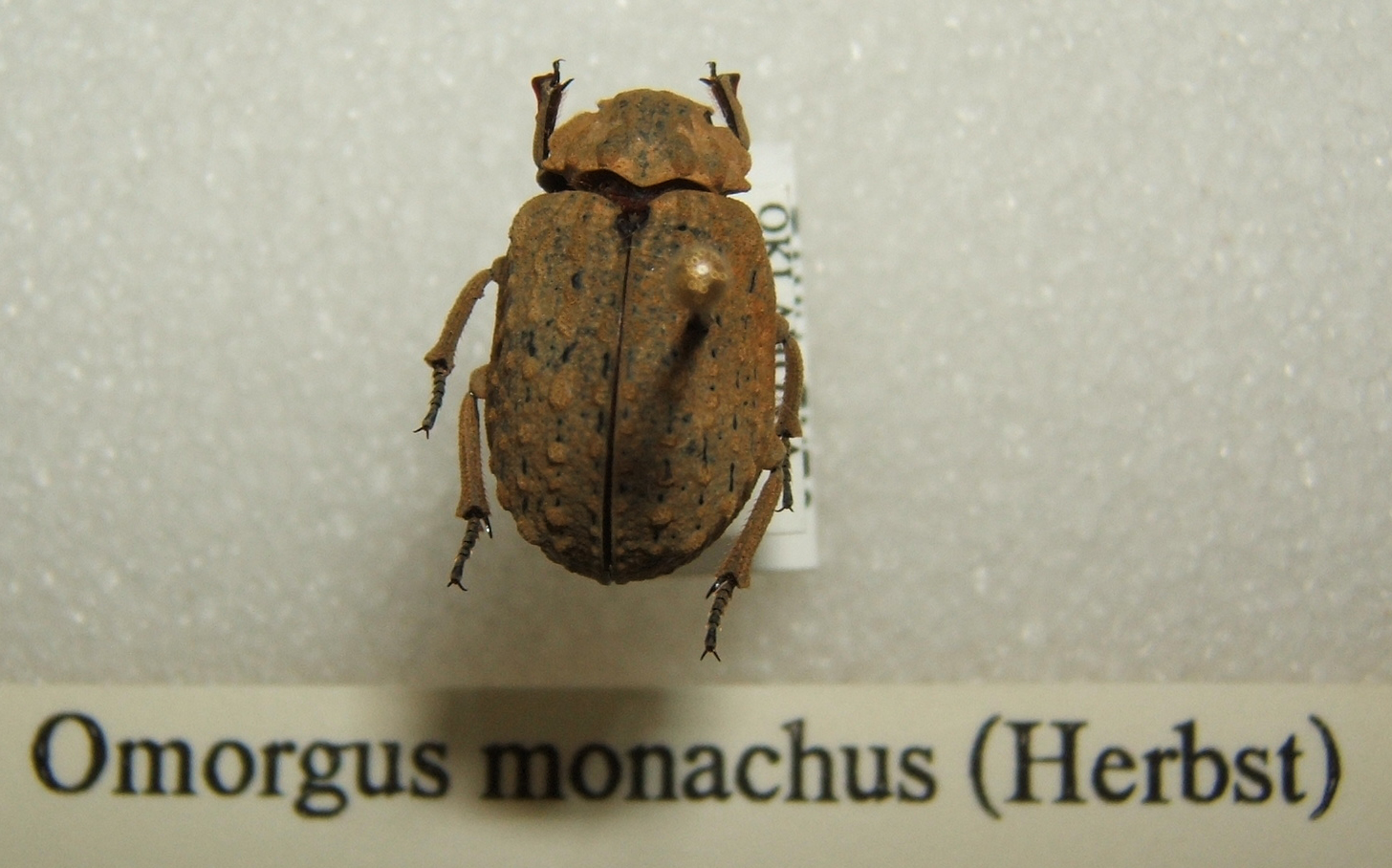
- Omorgus monachus, adult

Scientific classification
- Kingdom: Animalia
- Phylum: Arthropoda
- Class: Insecta
- Order: Coleoptera
- Suborder: Polyphaga
- Infraorder: Scarabaeiformia
- Family: Trogidae
- Genus: Omorgus
- Species: O. monachus

Binomial name
- Omorgus monachus (Herbst, 1790)

= Omorgus monachus =

Species of beetle

Omorgus monachus is a beetle of the family Trogidae. It is found in the United States from the Great Lakes region to Florida and west to Nebraska, Kansas, Oklahoma and eastern Texas.
