= Glyptholaspis =

Scientific classification
- Kingdom: Animalia
- Phylum: Arthropoda
- Subphylum: Chelicerata
- Class: Arachnida
- Order: Mesostigmata
- Family: Macrochelidae
- Genus: Glyptholaspis; Filipponi & Pegazzano, 1960
- Species: G. fimicola

Binomial name
- Glyptholaspis fimicola (Sellnick, 1931)

Genus of mites

Glyptholaspis is a genus of mites in the family Macrochelidae. There is one described species in Glyptholaspis, G. fimicola.
