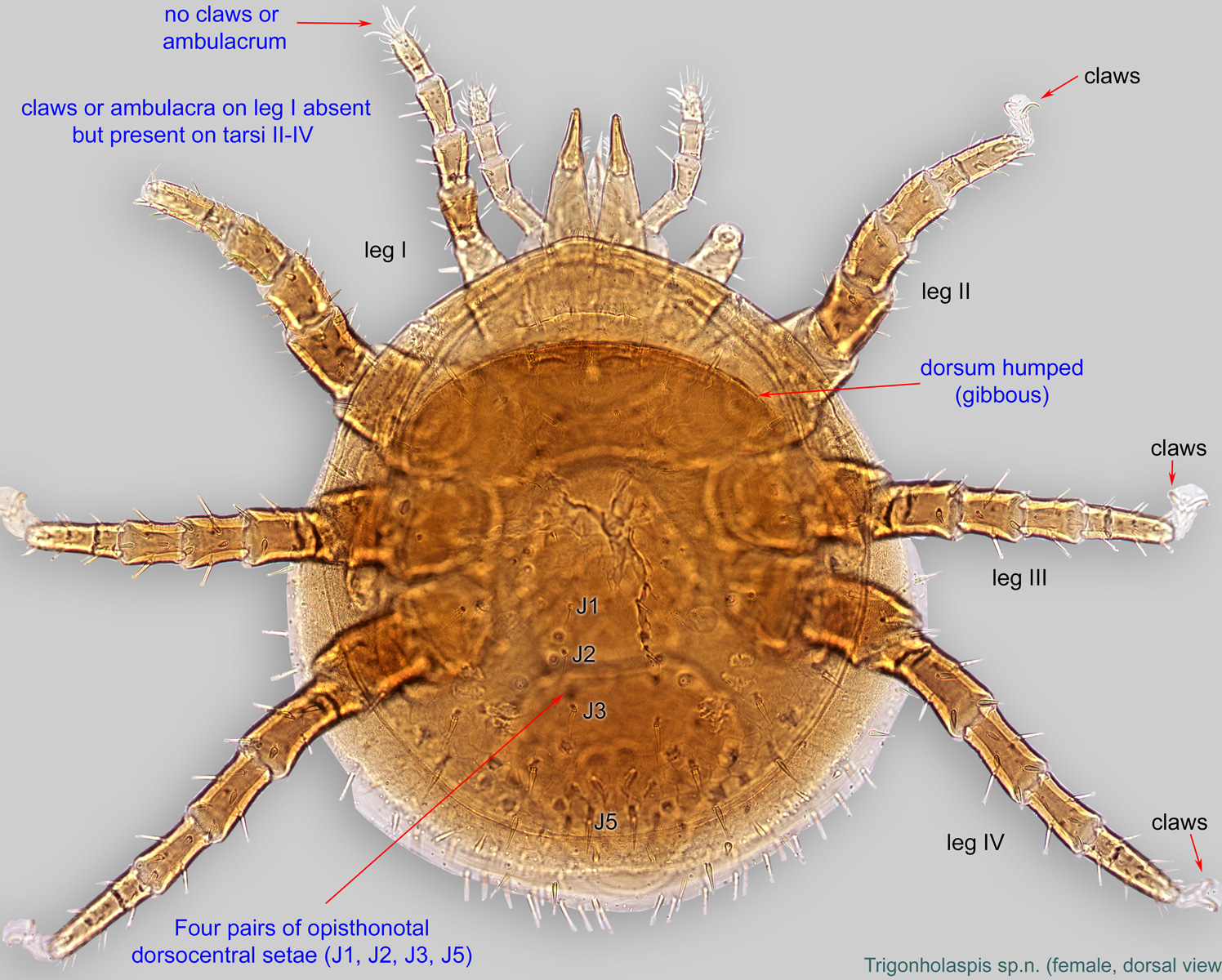

Scientific classification
- Kingdom: Animalia
- Phylum: Arthropoda
- Subphylum: Chelicerata
- Class: Arachnida
- Order: Mesostigmata
- Family: Macrochelidae
- Genus: Trigonholaspis; Vitzthum, 1930

= Trigonholaspis =

Genus of mites

Trigonholaspis is a genus of mites in the family Macrochelidae. There are at least four described species in Trigonholaspis.

== Species ==
These four species belong to the genus Trigonholaspis:

- Trigonholaspis amaltheae Vitzthum, 1930
- Trigonholaspis columbiana Vitzthum, 1930
- Trigonholaspis salti Vitzthum, 1930
- Trigonholaspis trigonarum Vitzthum, 1930
