= The Impertinent Insect =

Aesop's fable

There are no less than six fables concerning an impertinent insect, which is taken in general to refer to the kind of interfering person who makes himself out falsely to share in the enterprise of others or to be of greater importance than he is in reality. Some of these stories are included among Aesop's Fables, while others are of later origin, and from them have been derived idioms in several languages.

== The Flea and the Camel ==
Credited as among Aesop's Fables, and recorded in Latin by Phaedrus, the fable is numbered 137 in the Perry Index. There are also versions by the so-called Syntipas (47) via the Syriac, Ademar of Chabannes (60) in Mediaeval Latin, and in Medieval English by William Caxton (4.16). The story concerns a flea that travels on a camel and hops off at its journey's end, explaining that it does not wish to tire the camel any further. The camel replies that it was unaware it had a passenger. Phaedrus comments that "He who, while he is of no standing, boasts to be of a lofty one, falls under contempt when he comes to be known."

== The Gnat and the Bull ==
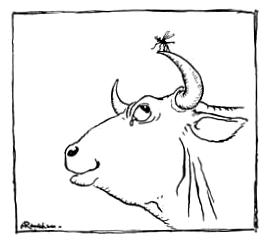
Arthur Rackham drawing for The gnat and the bull, 1912

Babrius recorded a variant story in which a gnat settles on a bull's horn but offers to fly off again if he finds it too much of a burden. The bull replies that he is indifferent either way and the moral is much the same as in the contemporary Phaedrus. The fable did not become generally known in Britain until a Latin verse translation appeared in Victorian textbooks and then versions in English fable collections. At the same time Paul Stevens published a diffuse French version in his Fables, published in Montreal (1857).

== The Gnat's Challenge ==
Ademar of Chabannes, who had a history of forgery, came up with a story of his own which he passed off as ancient. This appears as fable 564 in the Perry Index. There a gnat challenges a bull to a trial of strength but then claims that, by accepting, the bull has acknowledged it as his equal. Ademar's comment is that the bull "should have dismissed this opponent as beneath contempt and the impertinent creature would not have had anything to boast about."

== The Fly on the Chariot Wheel ==
The fable was composed in Latin by Laurentius Abstemius and appeared in his Hecatomythium (1490) under the title Musca et Quadrigae. It was added to the Perry Index as Fable 724. Here a fly perches on a chariot during a race and comments on how much dust it is raising. Gabriele Faerno included it in his own Centum Fabulae (1563), giving the impression that it was of Aesopic origin, although verbally it is close to the text of Abstemius.

Francis Bacon also took the fable to be Aesopic, observing that "It was prettily devised of Æsop: The fly sat upon the axle-tree of the chariot-wheel, and said, What a dust do I raise!" at the start of his essay "On Vainglory". Eventually 'the fly on the coach wheel' became an English idiom with the meaning of "one who fancies himself of mighty importance but who is in reality of none at all".

== The Fly and the Ox Ploughing ==
A variant story of a boastful insect claiming a share in the labours of others appeared in the Middle Ages among the 'fox fables' (Mishlei Shualim) of the French Jew Berechiah ha-Nakdan. A fly perching between a bull's horns is asked by a bee why it is wasting its time there. The fly replies that "I and the bull have worked all day at ploughing this great plain" and suggests that the bee should be as industrious. The author then comments: "the lowly who walks amongst the mighty or ... the iniquitous who is mustered in the camp of the upright. In their counsel and in their strength he cannot stand, but by the utterance of his mouth he is joined with them to make his might equal to theirs and his wisdom to their wisdom".

The fly's reply later became proverbial and there are allusions to it in several languages. In Franco Sacchetti's collection of Italian anecdotes, Il Trecentonovelle (1399), a character sums up a series of instances at the end of one story with the remark that "It's like the fly on the ox's neck who, asked what it was doing, replied 'We're ploughing'". A 17th century collection of proverbs records a similar Spanish allusion, "We're plowing said the fly on the ox's horn". This is echoed in English too at the end of Henry Wadsworth Longfellow's early play The Spanish Student (1843): "and so we plough along, as the fly said to the ox".

Much the same story as Berechiah's was told at the start of the 19th century by Ivan Dmitriev in his Russian poem "The Fly" (Mucha, 1805). As the insect rides home on a bull's horn, it boasts to another, "We've been plowing" (Мы пахали). In Russia too that phrase is still used idiomatically to mock people who exaggerate their own contributions.

== The Fly and the Mule ==
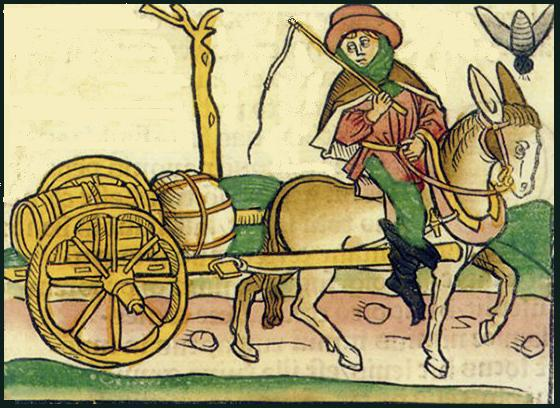
A woodprint of The fly and the mule from the 1476 Ulm edition of Steinhöwel's collection of Aesop's Fables

This fable has the longest history of internal change. It was recorded by Phaedrus and is numbered 498 in the Perry Index. There, a fly seated on the cart threatens to sting the mule if it does not pull faster. The mule replies that he only fears the driver and his whip. Empty threats from bystanders mean nothing. This entered the European canon through Heinrich Steinhöwel's collection of Aesop's fables (1476) and the books derived from it, including Caxton's collection. In Roger L'Estrange's large collection, however, his "The Fly on the Wheel" seems to blend the two fables together: "What a Dust do I raise! says the Fly upon the Coach-Wheel? and what a rate do I drive at, says the same Fly again upon the Horse's Buttock?"

La Fontaine's Fables expands the scenario with his treatment of "La coche et la mouche" (VII. 9), where the emphasis shifts wholly to the insect. Six horses strain to pull a stage-coach up a sandy hill and all the passengers are obliged to get out. A fly now buzzes about, urging on the horses and supervising the progress of the coach, then complains that all the work has been left to it alone. The fabulist comments,

Thus certain people, with important air,
Meddle with business they know nought about:
Seem to be wanted everywhere,
And everywhere they ought to be turned out.

This version of the fable has twice been set to music: as the fifth piece in Benjamin Godard's Six Fables de La Fontaine (op. 17 1872/9); and as the second piece in Maurice Thiriet's Trois fables de La Fontaine (1959) for 4-part children's a cappella chorus. In French the idiomatic phrase Faire (or jouer) la mouche du coche continues to be applied to self-important do-nothings.

Hitherto, the fables had been pithily told, but La Fontaine's leisurely and circumstantial narration over the length of 32 lines went on to infect those who followed him in other languages with similar prolixity. William Godwin adapted the gist to a short story of "The Fly in the Mail Coach" in his Fables Ancient and Modern (1805), although otherwise seeming to draw more from L'Estrange than La Fontaine. The same is true of the prose version of "The Fly and the Wagon" that appeared in The Flowers of Fable (New York, 1833). Claimed there to be translated from the Dutch, that too mixes Abstemius with La Fontaine and culminates in a horse killing the fly with a switch of its tail.
