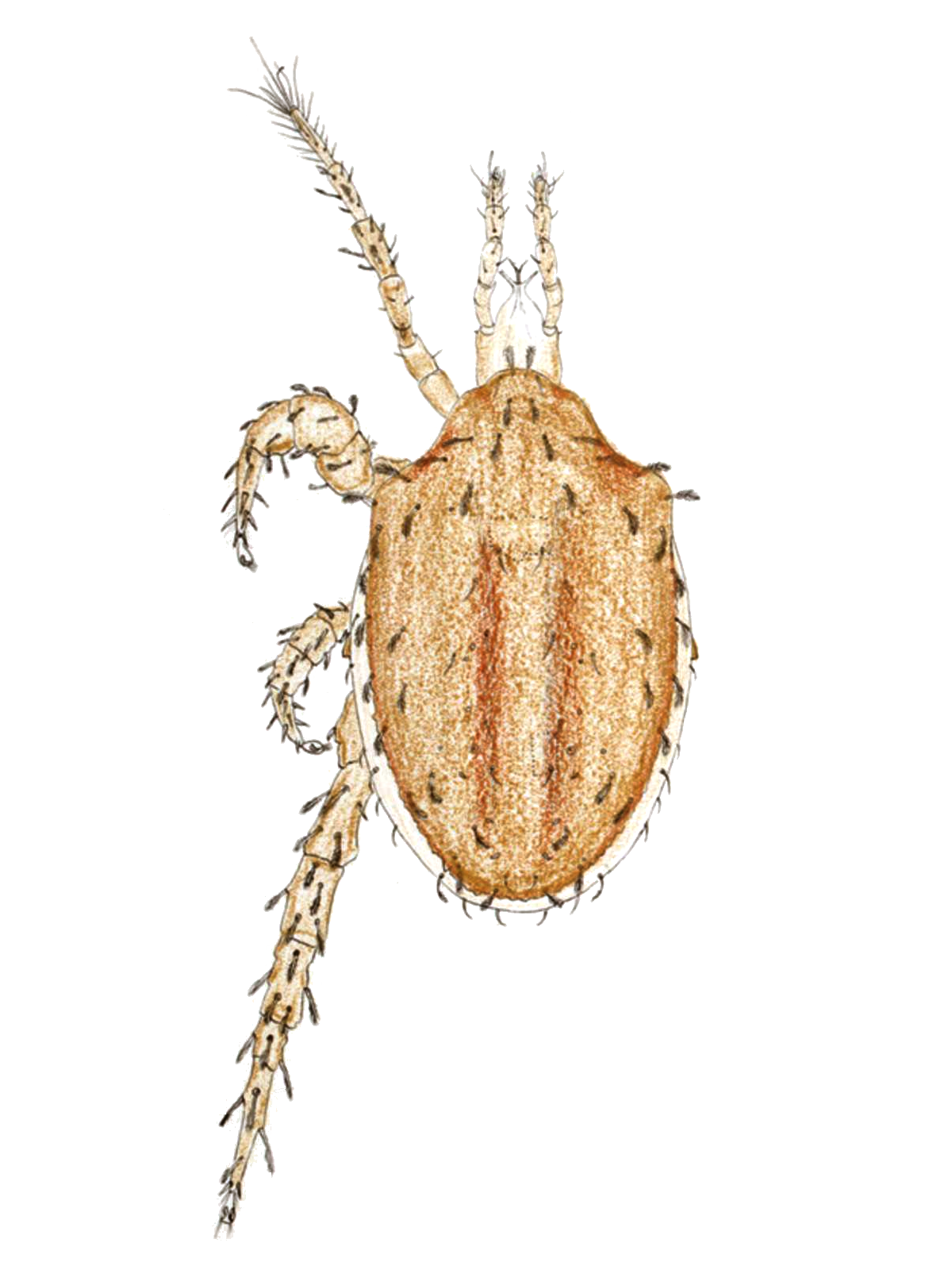
- Macrocheles carinatus. (The legs on the right side have been omitted in this drawing.)

Scientific classification
- Kingdom: Animalia
- Phylum: Arthropoda
- Subphylum: Chelicerata
- Class: Arachnida
- Order: Mesostigmata
- Suborder: Monogynaspida
- Infraorder: Gamasina
- Superfamily: Eviphidoidea
- Family: Macrochelidae; Vitzthum, 1930

= Macrochelidae =

Macrochelidae Temporal range: Quaternary–present

Family of mites

Macrochelidae is a family of mites in the order Mesostigmata.

== Description ==
Adult females of Macrochelidae have: an undivided dorsal shield bearing at least 28 pairs of setae, a sternal shield with three pairs of setae, a genital shield with one pair of setae and with a pair of conspicuous accessory sclerites beneath lateral margins, usually a ventrianal shield with 1–5 pairs of setae in addition to circumanal setae, peritreme usually looped around stigma, and movable cheliceral digit usually with a well-developed arthrodial brush at the base. Adult males are similar but with a holoventral shield or separate sternigenital and ventrianal shields.

== Reproduction ==
Macrochelidae reproduce sexually and some can also reproduce asexually. Species of Geholaspis and Macrocheles can perform thelytoky, the production of female offspring from unfertilised eggs. Species of Glyptholaspis, Holostaspella and Macrocheles can perform arrhenotoky, the production of male offspring from unfertilised eggs.

== Ecology ==
Mites of this family are predators. The majority of species are coprophilous, meaning they live in animal dung and feed on the prey available there (oligochaete worms, nematodes, arthropod eggs and larvae). Dung offers high prey availability and shelter from the weather, but it is a temporary resource. Melicharids therefore attach to insects (e.g. scarab beetles or flies) to be carried to fresh dung deposits; this is known as phoresis. Adult females tend to be the ones that engage in phoresis, though males and nymphs can do it as well.

Some macrochelids are believed to be facultatively parasitic on their hosts, rather than phoretic. An example is Macrocheles muscaedomesticae on flies.

Other macrochelids occupy habitats such as forest litter, decaying plant debris, beach wrack or the nests of various animals.

== Biological control ==
Because of their predatory nature, some macrochelids have potential as biological control agents of pest insects, such as flies and thrips. The species Macrocheles robustulus is commercially available for this purpose.

== Taxonomy ==
Macrochelidae contains the following genera and species:

- Aethosoma Krantz, 1962
  - Aethosoma burchellestes Krantz, 1962
- Ancistrocheles Krantz, 1962
  - Ancistrocheles bregetovae Krantz, 1962
- Andhrolaspis Türk, 1948
  - Andhrolaspis trinitatis Türk, 1948
- Beaurieuia Oudemans, 1929
- Bellatocheles van Driel & Loots, 1975
  - Bellatocheles variatus van Driel & Loots, 1975
- Calholaspis Berlese, 1918
  - Calholaspis superbus Berlese, 1918
  - Calholaspis taiwanicus Tseng, 1993
- Cophrolaspis Berlese, 1918
  - Cophrolaspis glabra (Müller, 1859)
- Evholocelaeno Berlese, 1918
  - Evholocelaeno bursiformis (Berlese, 1910)
- Geholaspis Berlese, 1918
  - Geholaspis aeneus Krauss, 1970
  - Geholaspis alpina (Berlese, 1887)
  - Geholaspis asper Valle, 1953
  - Geholaspis berlesei Valle, 1953
  - Geholaspis bianchii Valle & Mazzoleni, 1967
  - Geholaspis comelicensis Lombardini, 1962
  - Geholaspis foroliviensis Lombardini, 1943
  - Geholaspis hortorum (Berlese, 1904)
  - Geholaspis ilvana Valle & Mazzoleni, 1967
  - Geholaspis lagrecai Valle, 1963
  - Geholaspis longispinosa (Kramer, 1876)
  - Geholaspis longula (Berlese, 1882)
  - Geholaspis mandibularis (Berlese, 1904)
  - Geholaspis pauperior (Berlese, 1918)
- Glyptholaspis Filipponi & Pegazzano, 1960
  - Glyptholaspis americana (Berlese, 1888)
  - Glyptholaspis asperrima (Berlese, 1905)
  - Glyptholaspis baichengensis Ma, 1997
  - Glyptholaspis cariasoi de-Jesus & Rueda, 1990
  - Glyptholaspis confusa (Foà, 1900)
  - Glyptholaspis filipponii Roy, 1988
  - Glyptholaspis fimicola (Sellnick, 1931)
  - Glyptholaspis indica Roy, 1988
  - Glyptholaspis orientalis Iavorschi, 1980
  - Glyptholaspis pontina Filipponi & Pegazzano, 1960
  - Glyptholaspis thorri van-Driel, Loots & Marais, 1977
  - Glyptholaspis wuhouyongi Ma, 1997
- Gonatothrix G. W. Krantz, 1988
  - Gonatothrix carinata G. W. Krantz, 1988
- Holocelaeno Berlese, 1910
  - Holocelaeno mitis Berlese, 1910
- Holostaspella Berlese, 1903
  - Holostaspella ateucha Halliday, 1988
  - Holostaspella bifoliata (Trägårdh, 1952)
  - Holostaspella caelata Berlese, 1910
  - Holostaspella congoensis (van Driel & Loots, 1975)
  - Holostaspella crenulata Krantz, 1967
  - Holostaspella exornata Filipponi & Pegazzano, 1967
  - Holostaspella foai Berlese, 1910
  - Holostaspella halawanyii Ibrahim, 1992
  - Holostaspella krantzi Roy, 1988
  - Holostaspella macula Karg, 1979
  - Holostaspella moderata Berlese, 1920
  - Holostaspella orientalis Roy, 1988
  - Holostaspella scatophila Takaku, 1994
  - Holostaspella sculpta Berlese, 1903
  - Holostaspella similiornata Roy, 1988
  - Holostaspella tropicalis Roy, 1991
  - Holostaspella tuberilinea (Karg, 1994)
- Lordocheles Krantz, 1961
  - Lordocheles desaegeri Krantz, 1961
- Macrocheles Latreille, 1829
  - See Macrocheles
- Neoholaspis Türk, 1948
  - Neoholaspis coprophilus Türk, 1948
- Neopodocinum Oudemans, 1902
  - Neopodocinum caputmedusae (Berlese, 1908)
  - Neopodocinum dehongense Li & Chang, 1979
  - Neopodocinum galfyi Samsinak & Daniel, 1978
  - Neopodocinum gigantum Gu & Li, 1987
  - Neopodocinum halimunensis Hartini & Takaku, 2003
  - Neopodocinum jaspersi Oudemans, 1902
  - Neopodocinum magna Krantz, 1965
  - Neopodocinum maius Berlese, 1911
  - Neopodocinum petrovae Davydova, 1979
  - Neopodocinum sinicum Li & Gu, 1987
  - Neopodocinum spinirostris (Berlese, 1910)
  - Neopodocinum subjaspersi Hartini & Takaku, 2003
  - Neopodocinum vanderhammeni Krantz, 1965
  - Neopodocinum wainsteini Arutunian, 1993
  - Neopodocinum yunnanense Li & Gu, 1987
- Nothrholaspis Berlese, 1918
  - Nothrholaspis tridentatus (G.& R. Canestrini, 1882)
- Proholaspina Berlese, 1918
  - Proholaspina micrarhena (Berlese, 1916)
- Synaphasis Krantz, 1961
  - Synaphasis congoensis Krantz, 1961
- Tigonholaspis Vitzthum, 1930
  - Tigonholaspis saiti Vitzthum, 1930
- Tricholaspis Evans, 1956
  - Tricholaspis marginipilis Evans, 1956
- Tricholocelaeno Berlese, 1918
  - Tricholocelaeno longicoma (Berlese, 1910)
- Trigonholaspis Vitzthum, 1930
  - Trigonholaspis trigonarum (Vitzthum, 1930)
- Venatiolaspis van Driel & Loots, 1975
  - Venatiolaspis pilosus van Driel & Loots, 1975
