= Petrushka =

Stock character of Russian folk puppetry

Petrushka (Russian: Петру́шка, IPA: [pʲɪtˈruʂkə]) is a stock character of Russian folk puppetry. It was first introduced by traveling Italian performers in the first third of the 19th century during a period of Westernization in Russian culture. While most core characters came from Italy, they were soon transformed by the addition of material from the Russian cultural context.' Petrushkas are traditionally hand puppets. The character is a kind of a jester, a slapstick protagonist distinguished by his red dress, a red kolpak, and often a long nose.

== Name ==
The name "Petrushka" originally and primarily refers to the specific stock character of the Russian carnival puppetry. However, like Guignol, due to the central role Petrushka played in the puppet theatre, it also has come to refer to the tradition more generally (sometimes referred to as balagan (балаган) after the carnival booths in which the plays were enacted), or even the general category of Russian hand puppets as a whole.

Although the Russian word "petrushka" has a homonym meaning "parsley", in this context the word is actually a hypocoristic (diminutive) for "Pyotr" (Пётр), which is Peter in Russian. Despite this, the character has little or nothing in common with the commedia dell'arte stock characters of Petruccio or Pierrot (whose names are themselves diminutive forms of the Italian and French names for Peter), but is instead a Russian version of Punch or Pulcinella.

Though Petrushka's name still likely comes to the Russian puppet theatre through the commedia dell'arte, Petrushka's popularization following the Peter the Great's Westernization efforts have led many to speculate about the relationship nonetheless.

== Description ==
=== As stock character ===
==== Form ====
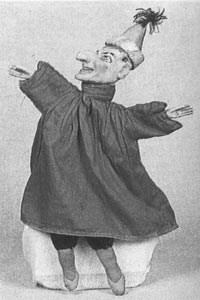
I.A. Zaitzev, Petrushka Hand-Puppet, late 19th-early 20th c.

While the Petrushka puppet has been attested as both a marionette and a hand puppet, in the vast majority of occurrences he takes the form of the latter. He typically appears as a small figure with exaggerated features, taking aesthetic cues from the clown performers upon which such stock puppets are originally based, while also allowing the important aspects of his appearance to be seen from an audience despite his small size. His face, for instance, is the largest portion of the puppet, with a proportionally smaller torso and legs that dangle beneath the structural body of the glove puppet. Overall, the size of the puppet is determined by the limiting factor of the human hand, with the width delineated by the space between the thumb and pinky, which act as the puppet's arms, while the three proximal fingers serve as the puppet's torso supporting the head. The length has more variation but typically is fewer than 19 inches since the legs hang toward the proximal part of the forearm.

The head of the Petrushka puppet was traditionally made with wood, such as birch, with papier-mâché applied to it so as to be lightweight and to make a sound when hit, such as was often the case in the slapstick comedy of carnival theatre. Petrushka is most often represented wearing red clothing (typically a kaftan and kolpak) and carrying a club called a dubinka (дубинка). His face is defined primarily by his long nose and pointed red hat, with static features that do not have any articulation points. Instead, emotions are conveyed through movement, and the downward slope of the face is designed in such a way that expressions are made possible through the angle at which the puppet's face is viewed.

==== Personality ====
Petrushka's personality typically follows that of Pulcinella. He was described by prominent Soviet puppeteer Nina Simonovich-Efimova as the "classical ne'er-do-well in the puppet family." He is presented as mischievous, self-serving, gluttonous, aggressive, and cowardly. He is usually at the center of conflict in the Petrushka carnival plays, often getting himself out of trouble by killing the other puppets on stage with a swing of his club.

=== Petrushka in the carnival theatre ===
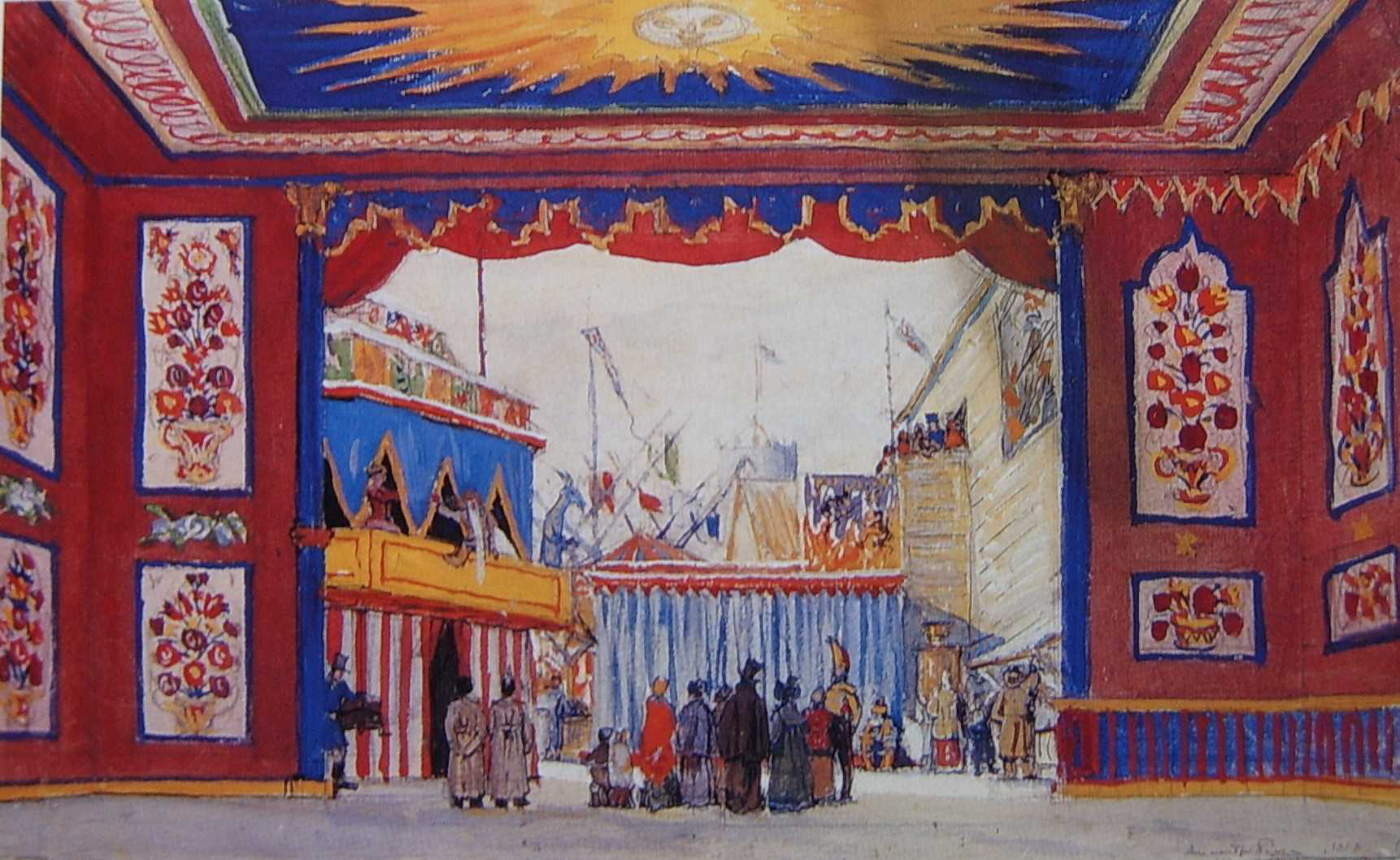
Alexander Benois' depiction of a Russian Petrushka theatre, 1911.

Petrushka plays were primarily performed in the setting of the carnivals held in cities such as Saint Petersburg, particularly during Shrovetide. At these carnivals surrounding Easter, booths were specially constructed and situated for commedia dell'arte performances, which were performed in wooden structures called balagans that held up to 1500 people in the audience. This was significantly larger than the small huts that Petrushka performances began in at the beginning of their popularity in the mid 19th century, where their booths were situated at the periphery of the fairgrounds and held fewer than 200 patrons, which allowed audience members to see the small puppets in their booth.

The plays themselves were often referred to as Kamed' o Petrushke or Comedy of Petrushka, though there was not a single play to which they were referring. Rather, the Comedy was collectively referring to the different characters and scenes arranged in various ways for various audiences, including regional differences. These variants ranged from a simple monologue performed by the hero Petrushka to a full ensemble cast. In each of these cases, Petrushka was at the center of the action, rarely leaving the stage, and only matched in stage time by the character of the Musician--a human respondent (Cyrillic: Russian: ответчик, otvetchik) who served as a counterpart to the hero.

In addition to the Musician, who often played a hurdy-gurdy throughout the performance, other characters included Petrushka's fiance or wife, a horse-trader, a German, a doctor, a corporal, the policeman, the Devil, and Barbos, a large dog, who would drag Petrushka off the stage to end the play. Much of what we know about the Petrushka comedies comes from the folklorist Anna Fyodorovna Nekrylova, who analyzed the collected text of about forty Petrushka plays from the late nineteenth and early twentieth centuries. Nekrylova described twenty-three distinct scenes that make up the building blocks of a Petrushka comedy, which could then be combined (or omitted) as desired to fit the context of the performance. These variants include a scene in which Petrushka declares his intent to find a wife, Petrushka purchasing a horse, Petrushka with his fiancee, several variations of a scene with the doctor character treating Petrushka for medical injuries, a confrontation with a policeman, Petrushka meeting with a soldier, and several variations of Petrushka being dragged off stage by either the Devil or Barbos.

The puppeteer for the show did the voices for all the characters present in the show. However, the voice of Petrushka was distinct from the other characters on stage through use of a swazzle (Russian: пищик, pishchik). The dialogue was based on a momentary change of the swazzle and the "live" voice of other characters.

== History ==
=== 19th century ===
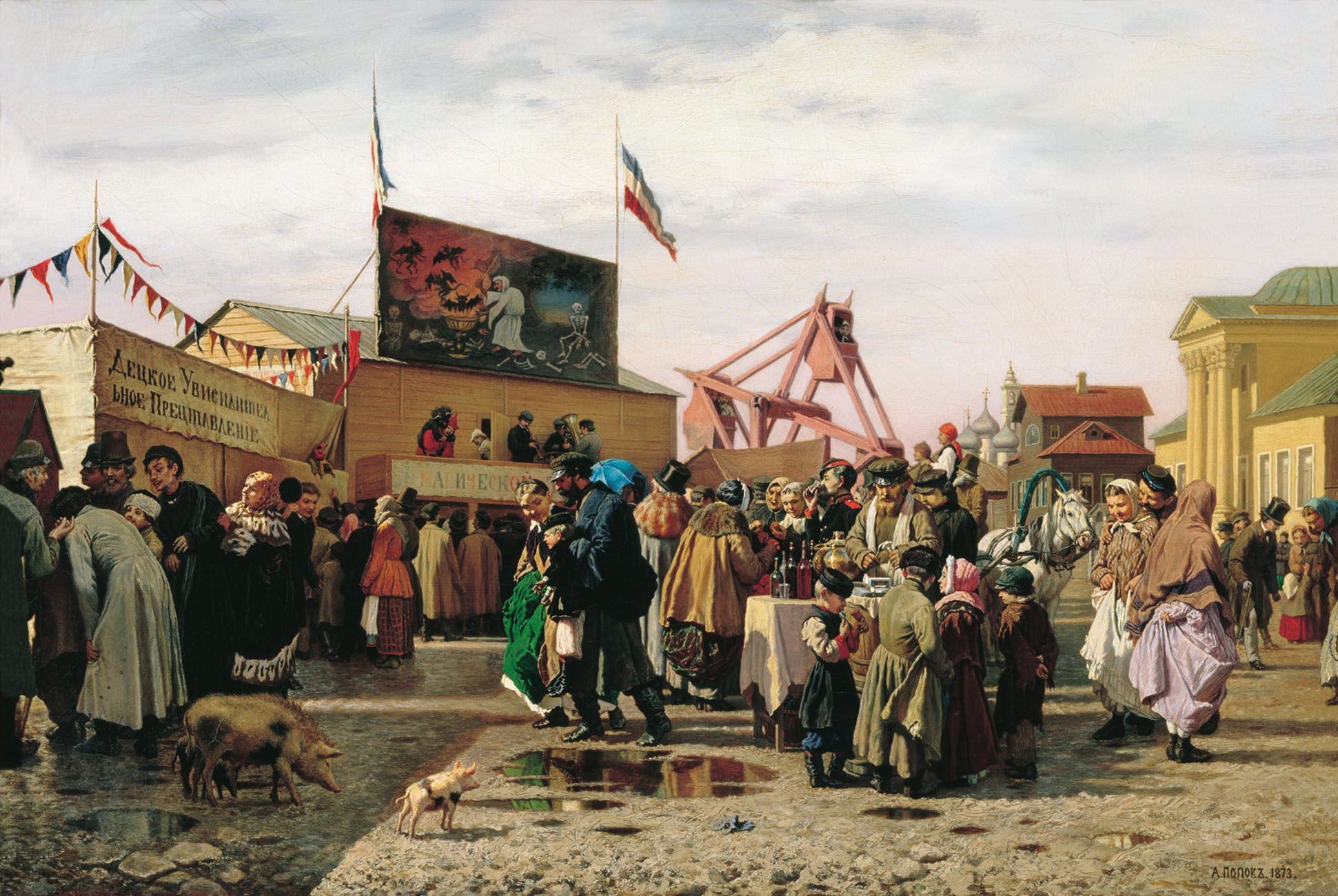
Andrei Popov, "Balagans in Tula during Holy Week", 1873.

Pietro-Mira Pedrillo of Italy, the court jester of the Empress Anna Ioannovna, allegedly served as a prototype for Petrushka.

The popularity of Petrushka comedies in particular largely began in the mid-nineteenth century, with the century from 1830–1930 being the height of its popularity. The origins of the Petrushka puppet in Russia are debated, with some claiming that there were origins of the tradition pre-dating the arrival of the commedia dell'arte with traveling Italian puppeteers after the period of Tsar Peter I's rule. While there was undoubtedly some form of puppet culture in traditional Russia, the influence of the commedia dell'arte on puppet theatre in Russia is undeniable. Originating as actors in clown makeup before gradually moving toward puppetry, Russian artists began to take over from the Russian-speaking Italian performers who had been running the scenes before.

Entry to the puppet booths was cheaper than to the larger, primary attractions at the late 19th-century Russian carnival, with standard entry as low as a grivennik (10 kopecks), or even lower, depending on the development of the area. During the 1840s and especially after the emancipation of the serfs in 1861, industrialization in the cities brought more attention to the fairs. This was likely how Petrushka puppetry became a provincial form of entertainment, often frequented primarily by the urban lower class. At the same time, the Russian intelligentsia were more interested in the puppet theatres of Western Europe.

It was during this period that a young Fyodor Dostoevsky frequented puppet shows with his brother, attesting in his writings for the relationship between Petrushka and Pulcinella. In his diaries and in "Gospodin Prokharchin," he writes of Petrushka as a counterpart to "Pul'chinel," a companion who would take the stage as sidekick to the puppet whose antics would become his own. As others who came before and after him, Dostoevsky saw the Petrushka theatre as an exploration of Russian cultural identity. By the 1880s, Petrushka was the hero of these comedies, the sole constant among the moving parts of other characters and scenes. His popularity grew to the point of anachronistic texts from later periods retroactively referring to puppet shows of previous centuries petrushka. This also accounts for the frequent mixing of surnames, such as when Nina Simonovich-Efimova refers to the Russian puppet as "Petroushka Guignol Pickelherring Punch," describing him as a puppet who fell in with a bad crowd (i.e. a joke about the influence of the French, English, and Italian puppets on Russian puppetry).

With the popularization of the genre, the target demographic began to shift. Though children were never excluded from the booths at the fairgrounds, they were not the primary audience. Rather, Petrushka--and carnival affairs more generally--were most popular among young, single men. Starting in the 1870s, Petrushka puppets began to be bought and sold at the carnival grounds, along with Russian chapbooks (Russian: лубки, lubki) providing instructions on how to enact them. With this shift, though the carnival remained the primary venue for Petrushka, puppet theatre became increasingly associated with children's entertainment.

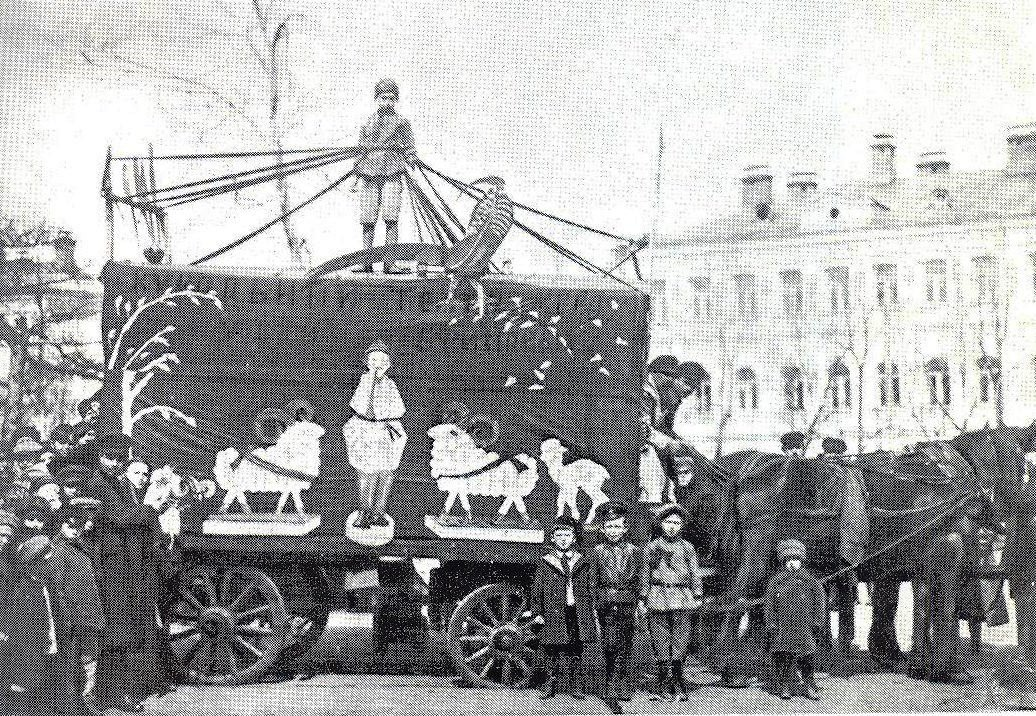
The Efimov Theatre in Moscow, 1919. The Efimovs were responsible for popularizing the standalone puppet theatre tradition in the 20th century.

=== 20th century ===
The early twentieth century saw both the growth and shift of Petrushka's popularity before its decline. In particular, the years leading up to and immediately surrounding the Russian revolution saw the growth of puppet theaters as year-round standalone cultural institutions outside of the Shrovetide carnival context, likely in response to growing revolutionary sentiments and an attempt by artists and audiences to connect with cultural roots.

In 1916, the influential theater critic and puppeteer Yulia Slonimskaia Sazonova opened her puppet theatre in Saint Petersburg. That same year in Moscow, Nina Simonovich-Efimova performed her first public Petrushka plays in Moscow before opening her own theatre with her husband sculptor and artist Ivan Efimov. The Efimovs were highly influential in the world of puppetry, including training Sergei Obraztsv who himself eventually became the President of the International Union of Puppeteers as well as named the Head of the Sergei Obraztsov State Academic Central Puppet Theatre by the Soviet government in 1931. Simonovich-Efimova published the most extensive description of practical puppet knowledge about Petrushka glove puppets in her theory "O Petrushke" ("About Petrushka") in 1919, along with books, pamphlets and guides for aspiring Petrushka puppeteers.

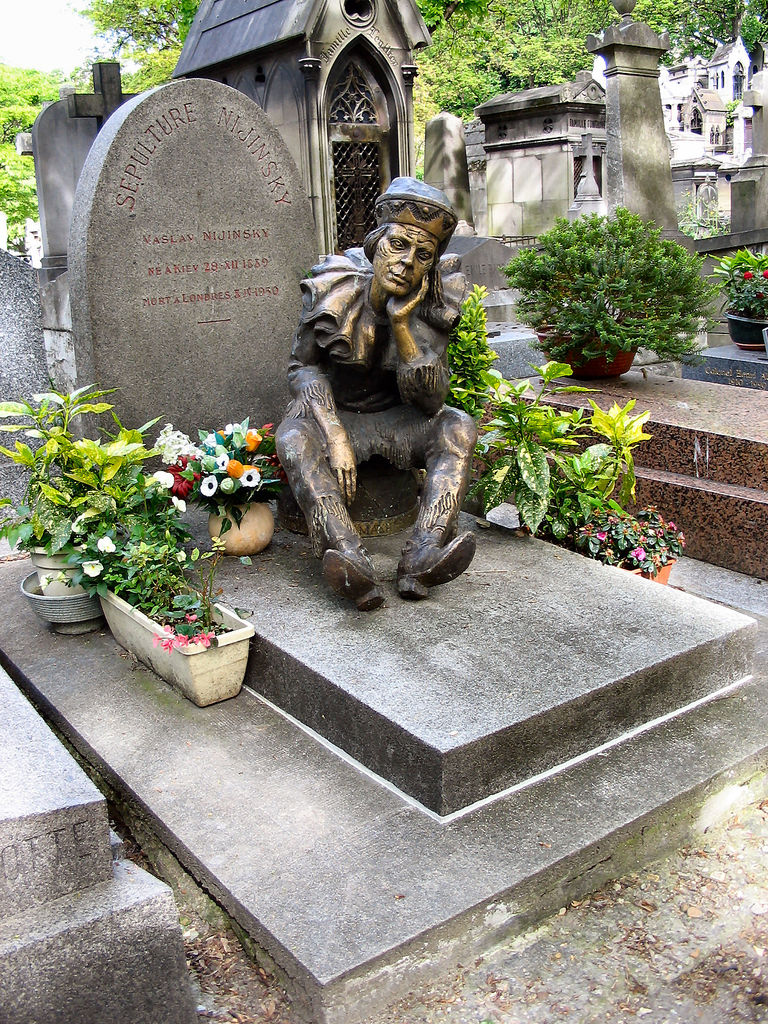
Tombstone of Vaslav Nijinsky in Montmartre Cemetery in Paris. The statue, donated by Serge Lifar, shows Nijinsky as the puppet Petrushka.

Meanwhile, while the practical art of puppetry was thriving under the Efimovs' influence, the image of Petrushka was outgrowing the puppet theatre in other ways. In 1911, the composer Igor Stravinsky wrote a ballet called Petrushka, in which the eponymous hero challenges the love interest of a ballerina he wants to marry. The plot of the ballet relies on knowledge of the Petrushka tradition, as the puppets are brought to life during Maslenitsa in 1830 Saint Petersburg, and plays with cultural expectations of the standard structure of a Petrushka comedy. Vaslav Nijinsky was the first to star on the stage as Petrushka.

At the same time, Petrushka was being used by Russian Symbolists in poetry, stage plays, and novels. The Symbolists were less interested in the puppet theatre than in what the symbol of the puppet represented between past and future. Drawing on the idea that the puppet superseded the human comedic actor, they used the image to comment on how the position of humanity between a mythic past and a tenuous future and the decline of society and the arts in Russia. Andrei Bely's 1913 novel Petersburg about the failed revolution of 1905, for instance, features a scene wherein the protagonist, Nikolai Apollonovich goes from a masked Harlequin of the commedia dell'arte to seeing himself in the mirror as the image of Petrushka amidst the threat of failure in his revolutionary activity.

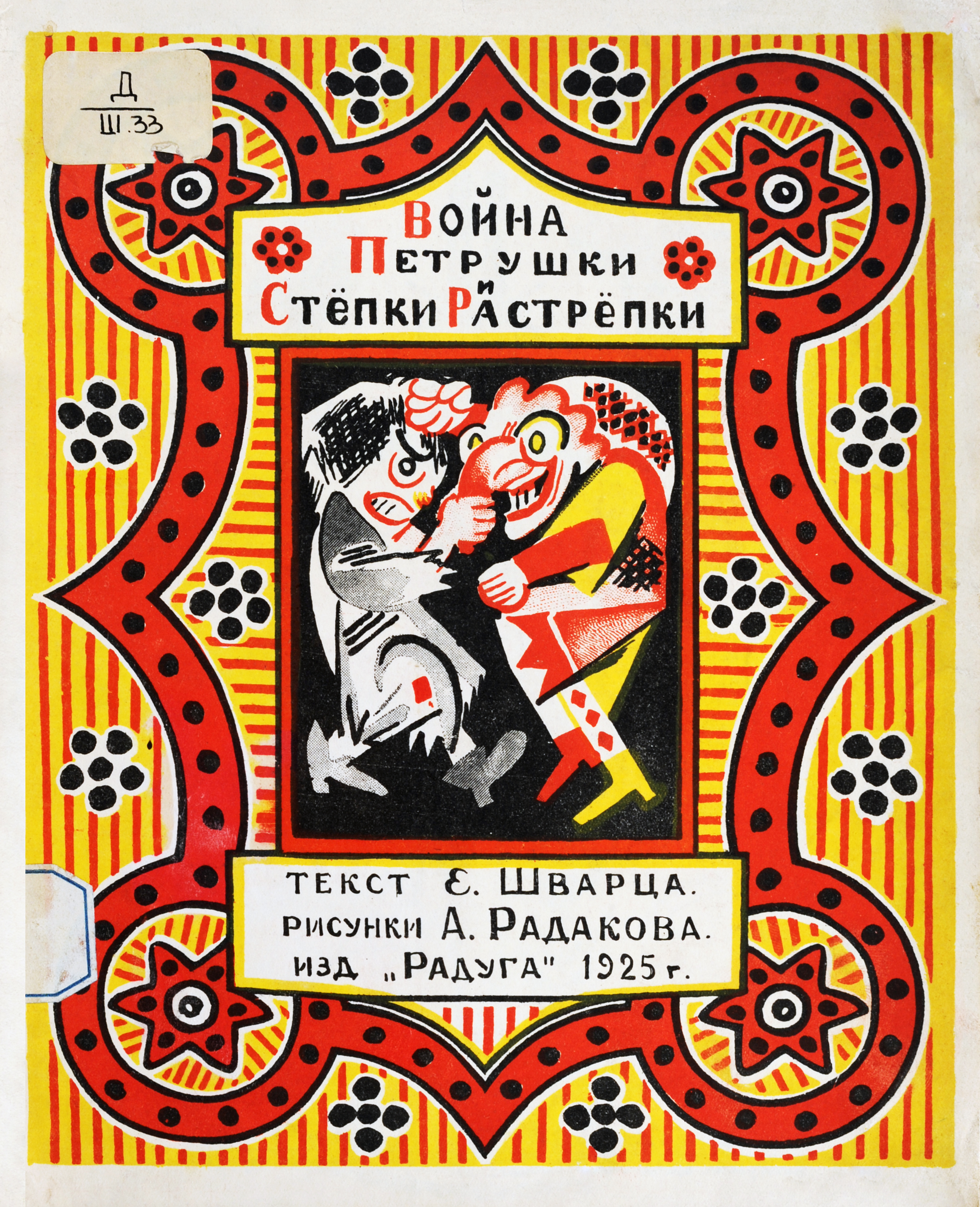
The War of Petrushka and Struwwelpeter, 1925.

During the early Soviet years, the puppet theatre again was transformed. Fairgrounds, the traditional home of the Petrushka theatre, were replaced with Parks of Culture in Rest throughout the late 1920s and 30s. Despite this, Petrushka continued. In the 1920s and 1930s, Petrushka increasingly became the subject of the children's literature. As puppet theatre gradually became a predominantly children's entertainment, Petrushka became less vulgar and aggressive, moving away from his slapstick roots.

Starting in the 1920s, troupes traveled from city to city doing Petrushka editions of the agitprop theatre in which Petrushka appeared defending poor peasants and attacking kulaks. Such groups directing Petrushka's last stand included the Red Petrushka Collective in 1927 and the Red Army Petrushka Group in 1928. However, by the late 1930s, this version of Petrushka, too, declined. Sergei Obraztsov claimed that Petrushka failed because before the revolution, Petrushka, who beat people with his club and enacted his own justice, was commenting on wrongs in the world that simply did not exist after the war. The lack of meaningful social commentary in Red Petrushka resulted in conflicts that seemed arbitrary and missing their carnivalesque sense of a world turned upside down.

=== Contemporary ===
The Russian Children's Welfare Society (RCWS) hosts an annual "Petroushka Ball", which is named after a version of the Petrushka character who fell in love with a graceful ballerina.

== See also ==
- Commedia dell'arte
- Glove puppet
- Guignol
- Nina Simonovich-Efimova
- Petrushka (ballet), music by Igor Stravinsky
- Punch and Judy
- Pulcinella
- Puppet theatre
- Sergey Obraztsov
