= Andrei Popov =

Andrei Popov may refer to:

- Andrei Alexandrovich Popov (1821–1898), Russian admiral
- Andrei Popov (actor) (1918–1983), Soviet actor
- Andrei Andreyevich Popov (1832-1896), Russian painter
- Andrei Popov (ice hockey) (born 1988), Russian ice hockey player
- Andrei Popov (politician) (born 1971), Moldovan politician 2009–2013
