= Le financier et le savetier =

1856 opera by Jacques Offenbach

Jacques Offenbach by Nadar, c. 1860s

Le financier et le savetier (The financier and the cobbler) is a one-act opérette bouffe of 1856 with words by Hector Crémieux and Edmond About, and music by Jacques Offenbach, based on the poem by La Fontaine. In 1842 Offenbach had set The Cobbler and the Financier (Le Savetier et le Financier) among a set of six fables of La Fontaine.

== Performance history ==
Le financier et le savetier was first performed in Paris, at the refurbished Théâtre des Bouffes-Parisiens, on 23 September 1856, and ran into 1857. In 1858 it was performed by the company at Bad Ems. At the Carltheater in Vienna it was staged as Schuhflicker und Millionär in January 1859. A complete recording of Keck’s critical edition was made in 2007.

== Roles ==
Role	Voice type	Premiere Cast, 23 September 1856 (Conductor: Jacques Offenbach)
Belazor, a financier	tenor	Étienne Pradeau
Larfaillou, a cobbler	tenor	Gustave Gerpré
Aubépine	soprano	Marie Dalmont
First guest	baritone	Davoust
A page, guests, servants

== Synopsis ==
The drawing-room of rich financier Belazor on his name-day; it is 1856 and nine o’clock in the evening

A page waits at the entrance, Belazor paces up and down. Larfaillou can be heard singing off-stage.

Larfaillou, the cobbler who works downstairs comes in, uninvited, and is asked to leave by Belazor (who is fed up with his constant singing). Larfaillou says he has come to ask for the hand of Belazor’s daughter Aubépine. Belazor asks how he has come to know the girl, and the cobbler replies that he does the repairs for the pensionnat where she stays. The cobbler also admits that the girl’s potential dowry and inheritance are no barriers to his proposal. Belazor stalls his first guests as he gets rid of Larfaillou. After the guests have gushed their admiration for him, Belazor (with Larfaillou singing off-stage again) outlines his hopes to get rid of his neighbour through statistical analysis of the death rate of cobblers: he will achieve it by forcing the merger of all the cobbler businesses in Paris so that Larfaillou is the only one left, and that given at least one cobbler dies each year in the city he will then get rid of him.

Aubépine, released from the pension for the celebration, enters and sings some couplets after which she presents a gift to her father. She then sings a 'fable', based on that by La Fontaine (‘Le Savetier et le Financier’), but arranged by her school mistresses. A waltz is heard in preparation for dancing. Belazor has a brainwave: invite the cobbler back up and bribe him with 300 écus. Larfaillou comes in and reluctantly accepts the money. Alone with Aubépine – who has fallen in love with him – he admits he is no Prince of Gerolstein, but – in a duo with Aubépine – declares his love for her. They wonder how to get round the problem of his lack of money. Aubépine says that she has learnt from her father how to play the stock exchange but as it is nearly midnight and it is closed, Larfaillou challenges one of the guests to a game of lansquenet. Chance is on his side; in the 'trio' he continually beats the guest. Then Belazor plays against him, but loses 8, 16, then 32 million, then his house, his spectacles and finally the financier has to strip out of his evening dress to hand over to Larfaillou. The cobbler, donning these fine clothes loses his common accent – while Belazor, in the cobbler’s old clothes begins to speak in slang. As a final attempt to annoy his neighbour the financier tries a song of his own, but Larfaillou merely asks for another verse. However, as a millionaire now, Larfaillou can again demand the hand of Aubépine.

The end of the trio ('Le jeu, fièvre brûlante') refers to the duo of Blondel and Richard 'Une fièvre brûlante' from Act II of Richard Coeur-de-lion. In the scene of ‘jeu d’oie’ in Act II of La belle Hélène Offenbach referred back to Le financier et le savetier.

== Recording ==
Ghyslaine Raphanel (soprano), Eric Huchet (tenor), Frank Thézan (tenor), Frédéric Bialecki (baritone); Orchestre des Concerts Pasdeloup conducted by Jean-Christophe Keck; recorded November 13, 14 & 16, 2007. CD: Universal Music Classics France 442 8964 DDD Stereo.
