= Alexander Agin =

Russian painter, illustrator and draftsman

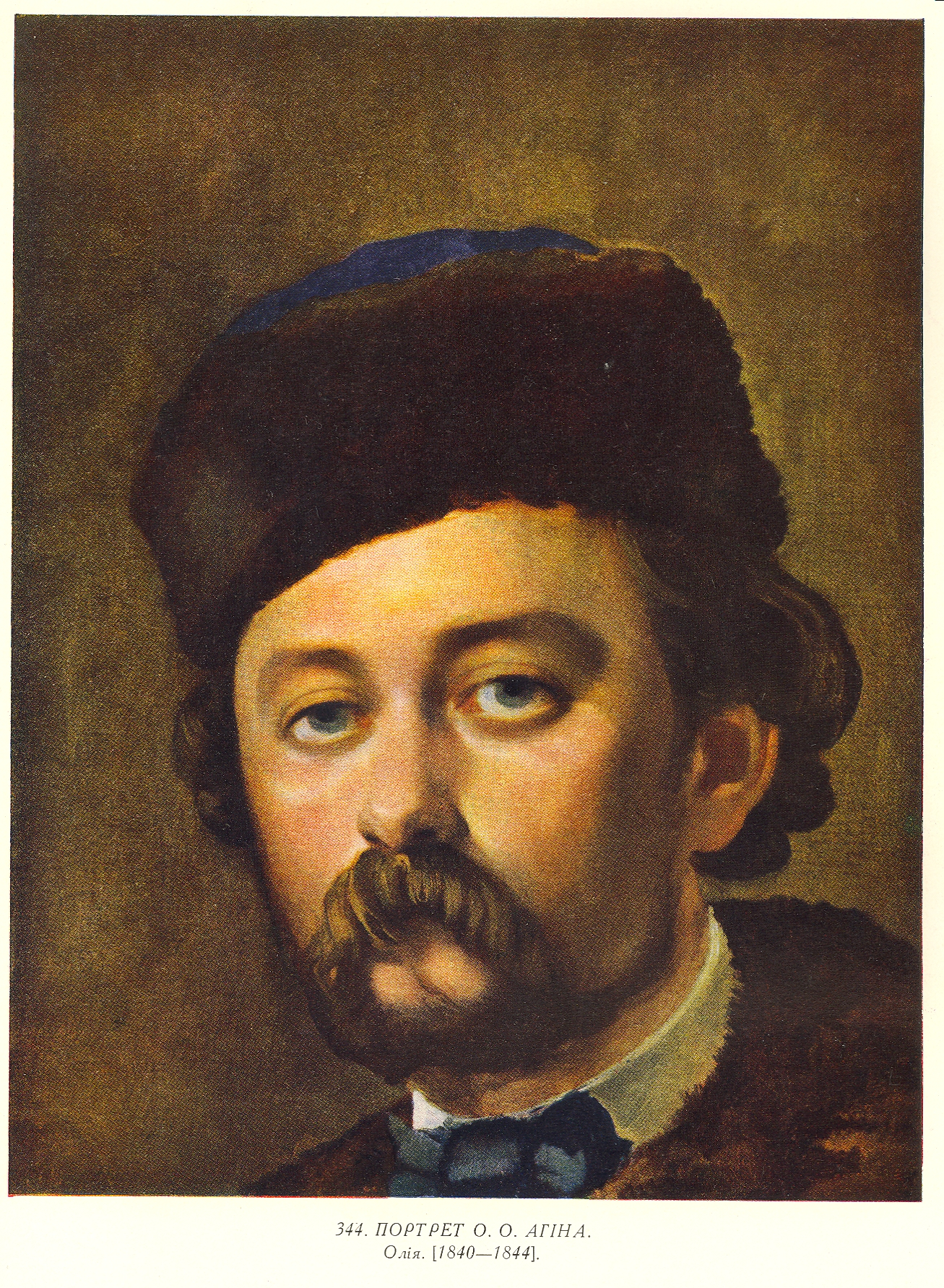
Alexander Agin; portrait by Taras Shevchenko (1840s)

Characters from Dead Souls

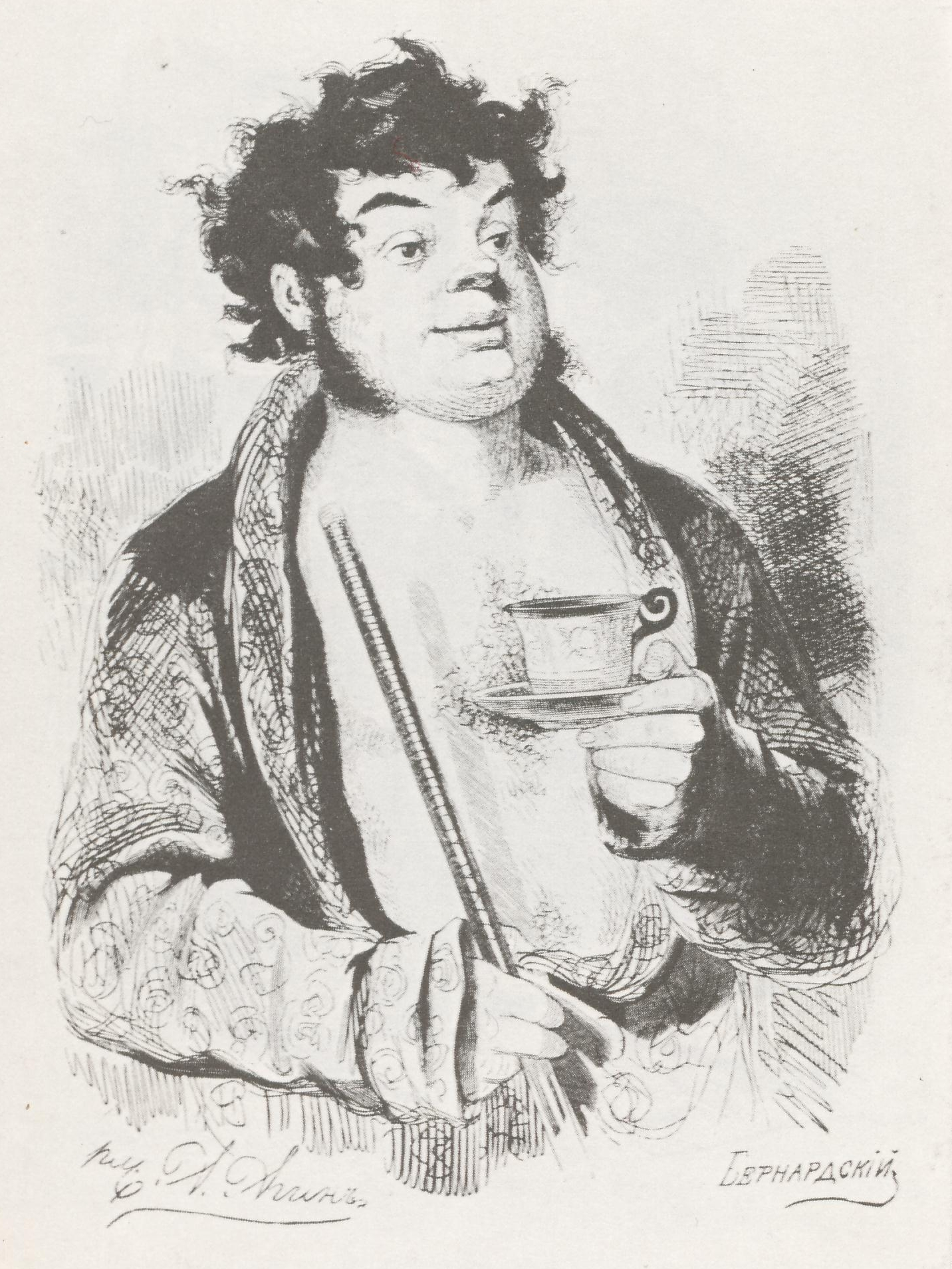
Nozdryov

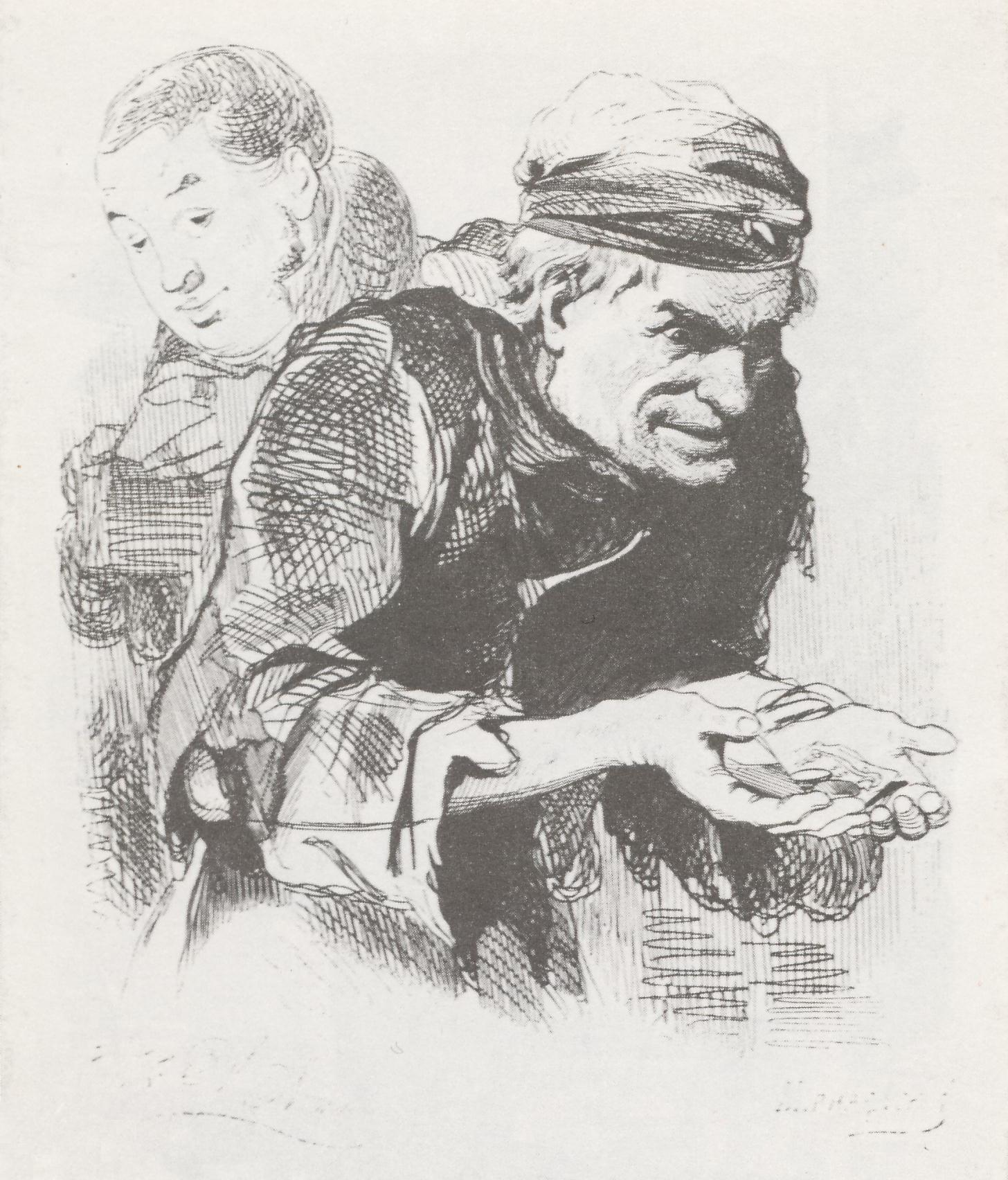
Plyushkin

Alexander Alexeyevich Agin (Russian: Алекса́ндр Алексе́евич А́гин; 11 May 1817, Pskov Governorate - 1875, Kachanivka) was a Russian painter, illustrator and draftsman.

== Biography ==
He was the illegitimate son of a serf and a retired Rittmeister named Alexei Petrovich Yelagin. Due to that status, his surname was shortened to "Agin".

From 1827, he studied at the Pskov Men's Gymnasium, then, from 1834 to 1839, at the Imperial Academy of Arts, under the tutelage of Karl Bryullov and Taras Shevchenko. Upon graduation, he was certified as a drawing teacher at the secondary school level. As early as 1844, his work was praised by Vasily Grigorovich, an influential member of the Imperial Society for the Encouragement of the Arts.

From 1844 to 1845, he illustrated the Old Testament and, in 1849, designed reliefs for the monument to Ivan Krylov in Saint Petersburg; sculpted by Peter Clodt von Jürgensburg.

In 1853, due to issues involving censorship, he moved to Kiev, where he taught drawing at the Vladimir Cadet Corps school and created props for the Berger Theater (a forerunner to the National Opera of Ukraine).

He died at the estate of Kachanivka; then owned by Vasily Tarnovksy, a well-known collector of Ukrainian art and antiquities.

He was one of the founders of modern Russian illustration; providing images for the works of Yevgeny Grebyonka, Ivan Panaev, Ivan Turgenev, Mikhail Lermontov and Alexander Pushkin as well as for numerous periodicals. He is, perhaps, best-known for the 104 drawings he created for Dead Souls by Nikolai Gogol; which were turned into woodcuts by his collaborator, Evstafy Bernardsky. They were also engraved by one of Bernardsky's students, Fyodor Bronnikov. They have been reissued on several occasions.
