= The Wolf and the Crane =

Fable by Aesop

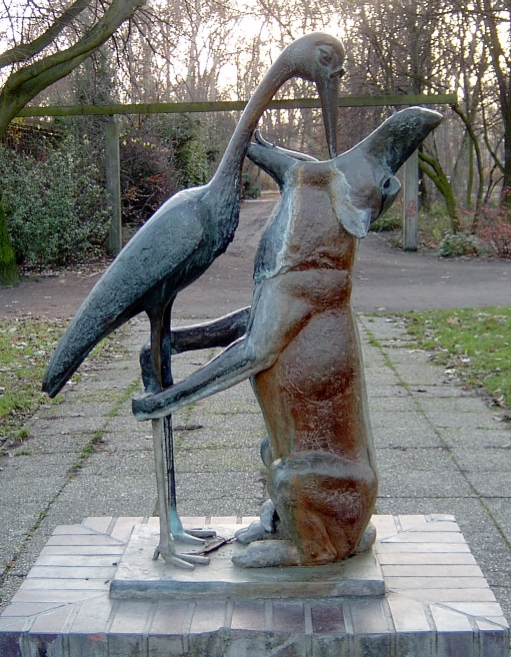
Stephan Horota's sculpture of the fable in Berlin's Treptower Park, 1968

The Wolf and the Crane is a fable attributed to Aesop that has several eastern analogues. Similar stories have a lion instead of a wolf, and a stork, heron or partridge takes the place of the crane.

== The fable and its alternative versions ==
A feeding wolf got a small bone stuck in his throat and, in terrible pain, begged the other animals for help, promising a reward. At last the Crane agreed to try and, putting its long bill down the Wolf's throat, loosened the bone and took it out. But when the Crane asked for his reward, the Wolf replied, "You have put your head inside a wolf's mouth and taken it out again in safety; that ought to be reward enough for you." In early versions, where Phaedrus has a crane, Babrius has a heron, but a wolf is involved in both.

The story is very close in detail to the Javasakuna Jataka in the Buddhist scriptures. In this it is a woodpecker that dislodges the bone from a lion's throat, having first taken the precaution of propping its mouth open with a stick. On testing his gratitude later, the woodpecker is given the same answer as the wolf's and reflects on the wisdom of avoiding future harm through association with the violent:

From the ignoble hope not to obtain
The due requital of good service done,
From bitter thought and angry word refrain,
But haste the presence of the wretch to shun.

A Jewish Midrash version, dating from the 1st century CE, tells how an Egyptian partridge extracts a thorn from the tongue of a lion. Its reward is similar to the other retellings. Another of this fable's earliest applications was at the beginning of the Roman emperor Hadrian's reign (117–138 CE), when Joshua ben Hananiah skilfully made use of the Babrius variant involving a wolf and a heron in order to dissuade the Jewish people from rebelling against Rome and once more putting their heads into the lion's jaws.

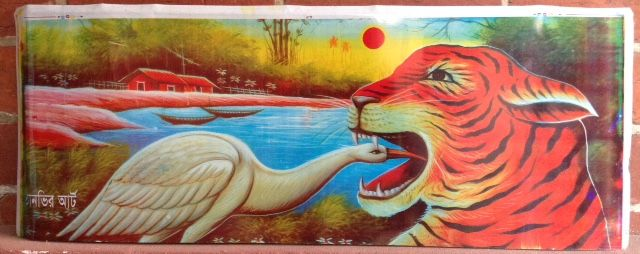
Rickshaw art from Bangladesh, featuring a tiger and egret

It is notable that both Asian versions are given a political application. This is equally true of John Lydgate's 15th century retelling of Isopes Fabules, titled 'How the Wolf deceived the Crane'. The crane there is described as a surgeon engaged to perform a delicate operation and then deceived out of his fee. Lydgate goes on to draw the wider lesson of how a tyrannous aristocracy oppresses the rural poor and gives them no return for their service.

Jean de la Fontaine makes his social point through satire. In Le loup et la cigogne (Fables III.9) he also describes the crane's action as a surgical service; but when it asks for the salary promised, it is scolded for ingratitude by the wolf. Gotthold Ephraim Lessing takes the satire even further in alluding to the fable in his sequel, "The Sick Wolf". The predator is near death and, in confessing himself to the fox, recalls occasions when he voluntarily abstained from killing sheep. The sympathising fox replies, 'I recollect all the particulars. It was just at that time that you suffered so much from the bone in your throat.' In Ran Bosilek's Bulgarian adaptation, "The Choking Bear", the stork, after being deceived once, takes the precaution of pulling out the bear's teeth before treating its patient again, forcing her to think of an alternative reward.

== Symbolic meanings ==
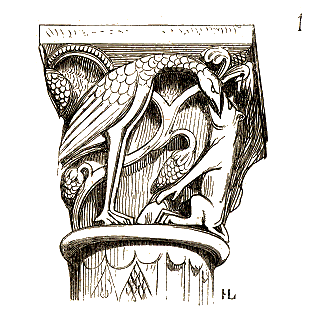
A capital head in Autun Cathedral

A political lesson can also be drawn from some mediaeval sculptures of the fable, most notably on the Great Fountain in Perugia executed in 1278 by Nicola Pisano and his son Giovanni. Since Perugia was at that time an ally of Rome, a carving of the wolf suckling Remus is included there; but the wolf peers back over her shoulder towards two adjacent panels depicting the fables "The Wolf and the Lamb" and "The Wolf and the Stork". This hints at the political lesson that the friend might find an excuse to swallow its ally or at the very least would not reward its help.

Where sculptures of the fable are found in a church, a different symbolism is involved. Commenting on its appearance above a capital of the west door of Autun Cathedral, one scholar points out that what is in this instance a fox typifies the devil, and the crane is an emblem of Christian care and vigilance, ever active in saving souls from the jaws of hell. The crane must therefore be imagined as coming to the rescue, not of the fox, but of the bone. This religious meaning made the subject, according to the French architect Eugène Viollet-le-Duc, one of the commonest sculpted on buildings from the 12th to the 13th century, not simply in France, but elsewhere in Europe. The fable appears as one of many animal scenes in the borders of the 11th-century Bayeux Tapestry.

The subject continues to be featured in more modern times, as evidenced by its appearance on the St. Petersburg monument to Ivan Krylov (1855), as a bronze sculpture by Joseph Victor Chemin (1825–1901) in the Musée Jean de La Fontaine, and by Stefan Horota in Berlin's Treptower Park (1968). In Bangladesh, the story is adapted to native species, the tiger and crane or egret, and is found painted on rickshaw panels as illustrated above.
