= The Cobbler and the Financier =

La Fontaine's fable

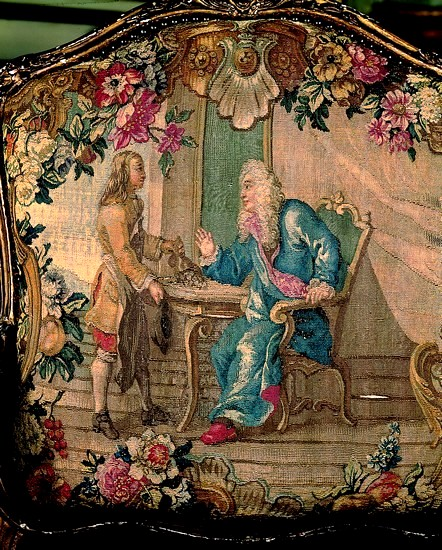
J-B Oudry's illustration of La Fontaine's fable, adapted for use as a Beauvais tapestry

The Cobbler and the Financier (Le Savetier et le Financier) is one of La Fontaine's Fables that deals directly with a human situation rather than mediating it through the behaviour of animal stereotypes. An adaptation from a Classical Latin source, it gained some currency in England during the 18th century and later in Russia, via Ivan Krylov’s 19th-century adaptation. In France it eventually served as the basis for a number of dramatic adaptations as well.

== A fable of dependency ==
La Fontaine's account is based on a story told by Horace in his verse epistle to Maecenas (I.7) concerning the lawyer Philippus and the crier Volteius Mena. The lawyer amuses himself by befriending a carefree and contented man and destroys his peace of mind by presenting him with the means to buy a farm. It is a disaster and eventually his client begs Philippus to return him to his former way of life. In the poem, Horace is pointing out to Maecenas that the obligations of his client status should not be urged to the point of damaging his health and that, if he cannot be allowed his independence, he is ready to return the benefits he has received in the past. The story he tells follows immediately after a shorter reference to one of Aesop's animal fables pointing to the same conclusion, "The Fox and the Weasel". John Addison, writing in 1735, relates a similar story told by Stobaeus (5th century) about the poet Anacreon. Having received a treasure of five gold talents from Polycrates, Anacreon could not sleep for two nights in a row. He then returned it to his patron, saying: "However considerable the sum might be, it's not an equal price for the trouble of keeping it."

La Fontaine adapts the story to the circumstances of his own century. A Financier's troubled rest is broken by the merry singing of a cobbler. The man of affairs interviews the workman about his business and offers him a gift of a hundred crowns to insure against a rainy day. Worry over the security of his nest-egg destroys the cobbler's own rest and allows the financier a period of unbroken repose. Finally the cobbler brings back the money and demands the return of his songs and his sleep. This particular passage is based, not on the story but on Horace's suggestion to Maecenas in the poem that he should give him back his health and light-hearted laughter (lines 25–8). The poem is also marked by many memorable lines, including the financier's wish that sleep was a commodity to be bought at market and the cobbler's suspicion that his roaming cat is after his money.

A fable that follows La Fontaine's account fairly closely was included soon after in Roger L'Estrange's Fables of Aesop and Other Eminent Mythologists (1692) and a verse translation of La Fontaine appeared later in Charles Denis' Select Fables (1754). However, Jonathan Swift had already made a humorous adaptation of Horace's poem at the start of the 18th century, retelling the story of his ruinous patronage by the Earl of Oxford in a more direct manner than had Horace, and in the process drawing out the original forty lines of the Latin author to 140 in octosyllabic couplets. The 18th century collection Democritus Ridens (The Laughing Democritus) tells a variant about Emperor Sigismund, where he orders a large amount of gold to be brought to his quarters, but a few hours later, in the middle of the night, summons a number of his advisors and friends, ordering them to take away the tormentor which keeps him from sleeping. It also retells the story about Anacreon, likewise ending it with him handing out the money to others.

== Interpretations ==
=== Artistic ===
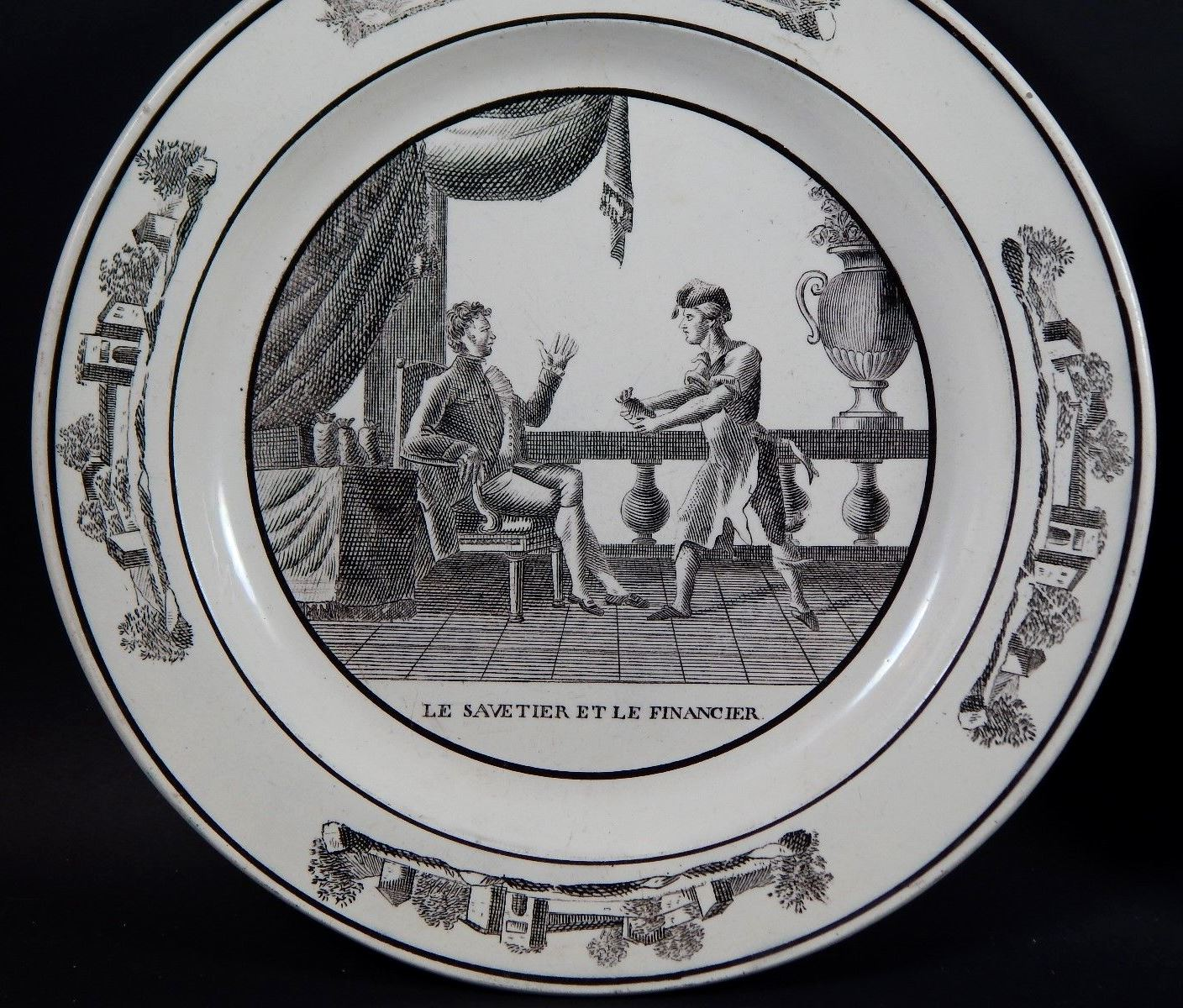
The final episode from La Fontaine's fable on a plate, c.1810

While many French illustrations of this popular story portray the cobbler in the financier's presence, two Russian depictions present him singing at his work. This is so in a 1951 pencil illustration by Valentin Serov to Ivan Krylov's Russian translation and in Marc Chagall’s coloured etching from 1952. Earlier on in Russia, Krylov's translation has been adapted into a four-panel lubok at least twice, each time using the same designs. These consisted of a band of four illustrations across the top of the sheet, followed by the poem in three columns beneath. The episodes there included the tax-farmer (in this version) being served at table by a servant; the cobbler receiving the money (five hundred rubles in this variant) in a bag; burying the money under the floor of his cabin; and returning the bag to his benefactor.

There were also several French composite publications combining the text of La Fontaine’s fable with serial illustrations. These included separate sheets by Hermann Vogel, which could also be combined in an album, and Louis-Maurice Boutet de Monvel’s Jean de La Fontaine, 26 fables, both published in 1888. Later there was Benjamin Rabier’s complete edition of the Fables of 1906, also illustrated in this form. A different kind of illustration followed later in the 20th century in the form of a comic strip. In Marcel Gotlib’s 1970 update of the fable, it is contemporary hit songs like "All You Need Is Love" and "Nights In White Satin" with which the carefree cobbler breaks the investment banker’s rest. Silenced by being presented with a 100 ECU cheque, the cobbler regains his lightness of heart by bringing the money back for the banker to invest on his behalf.

Earlier in the 20th century, the Art Deco sculptor Max Le Verrier (1891-1973) created a pair of metal book ends based on the fable. The two figures are represented in 17th century dress and present a contrast between lack and luxury. On one side the cobbler is sitting on a stool and focusses on his task while on the other the care-worn financier is in an armchair grasping the money bags in his lap.

=== Dramatic and musical ===
During the 18th-century the fable was given several dramatic adaptations in which the story-line is more or less the same, but with additional male and female characters so as to lengthen the performance and provide romantic interest. The earliest was the popular L’Embarras des Richesses (Troublesome Riches) by Léonor Jean Christine Soulas d'Allainval, a 1725 prose comedy in three acts which added two sets of lovers to the cast. It was followed by a two-act comedy interspersed with lyrics by Maximilien-Jean Boutillier (1745-1811) in 1761, and shortly after that by Toussaint-Gaspard Taconet’s two-act opéra comique of 1765. Later there was another comic opera in much the same form by Jean Baptiste Lourdet de Santerre (1732 – 1815), with music by Henri-Joseph Rigel. As the 1778 performance of that work met with no success, it was replaced in 1782 with a three-act musical comedy (comédie lyrique) set by André Grétry with the new title of L'Embarras des Richesses, borrowed from D’Allainval’s earlier work, which still continued in print.

Following the French Revolution, there were further attempts to give the fable new dramatic life. Les Deux Voisins was a prose comedy with sung intervals by Charles J. La Roche which had a single night’s performance in 1791. This was followed in 1793 by Pierre-Antoine-Augustin de Piis’ much more successful musical, Le Savetier et le Financier, which had repeated performances over the following years. The subject was taken up again in another one-act musical in 1815, Le Savetier et le Financier ou Contentement Passe Richesse (Better than wealth is content), by Nicolas Brazier and Jean-Toussaint Merle. This was successful enough for a scene from the production to appear as a commercial chimney plaque soon after.

Later in the 19th century, Jacques Offenbach, having already set the fable for soloist and small orchestra as part of his 6 fables de la Fontaine in 1842, wrote the music for a one-act comic opera, Le financier et le savetier (1856), with a script by Hector-Jonathan Crémieux in which the heroine sings a parody of his own setting. In that light-hearted entertainment, the cobbler turns the tables on his opponent by using the 300 crowns he is given to beat the financier at cards, taking over all his assets and winning the hand of his daughter, Aubépine. It was followed in about 1870 by a one-act bouffonerie musicale (knock-about musical) by (Mme) Sounier Geoffroy.

A later setting of just the fable itself was for children's choir and orchestra by Ida Gotkovsky as the final section of her Hommage à Jean de La Fontaine (1995).

At least three early silent films were also based on the fable: Le Savetier et le Financier of 1909, made by La Société des Etablissements L. Gaumont, another with the same title made in 1912 by La Société Française des Films Éclairs, and a 1911 Russian movie based on two of Ivan Krylov's fables including "The Tax-Farmer and the Cobbler" (currently considered lost).

== Attitudes to wealth ==
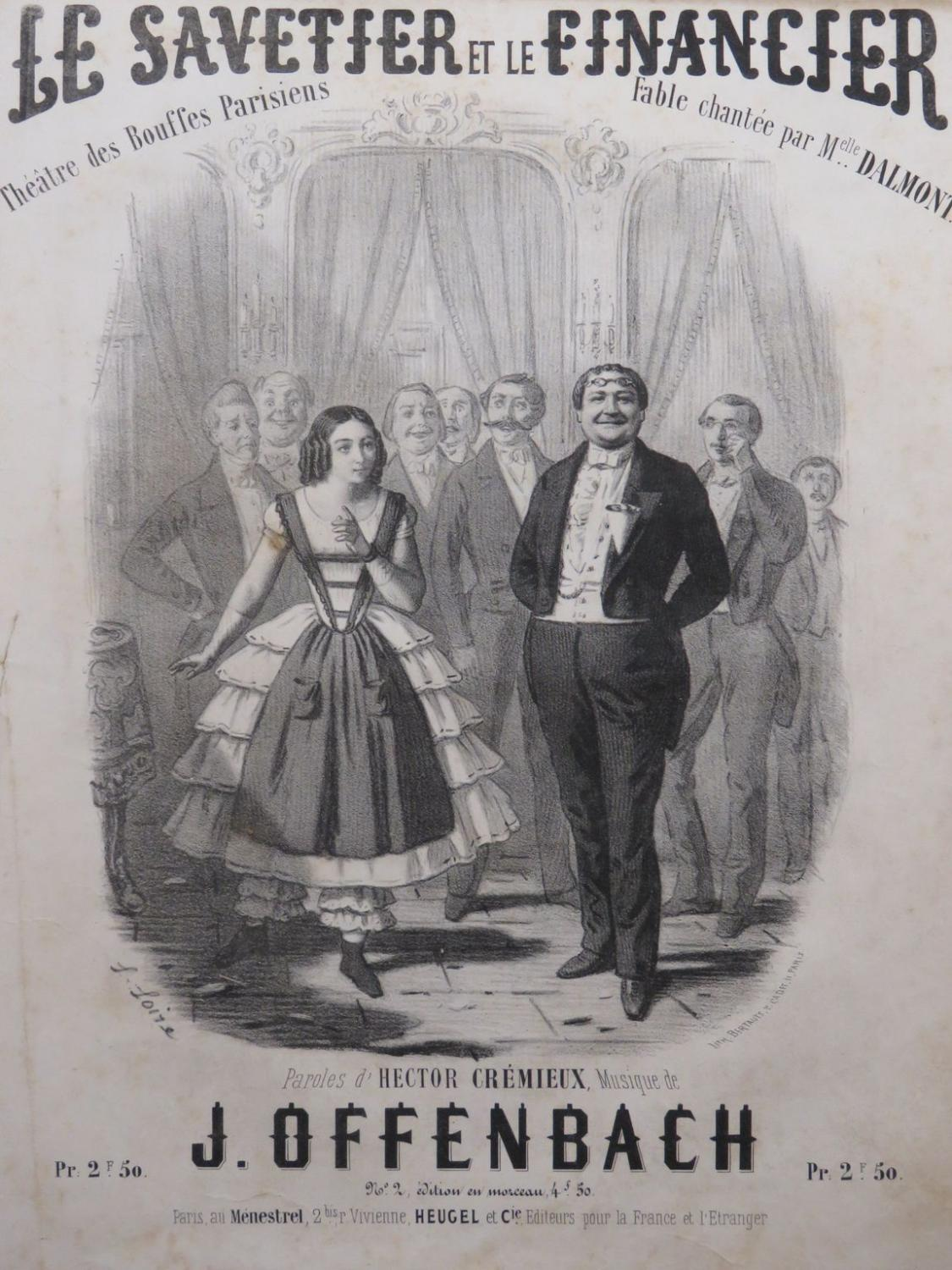
The score of Aubépine's solo from Offenbach's opera

The original fable as told by Horace occurs in a criticism of the dependent client-patron relationship and the anxiety it brings. His advice at the end is that it is better to retain one's independence for "it is right that each should measure himself by his own rule and standard" (Epistle 7, line 98). Swift followed him in applying the story to his own circumstances. But La Fontaine used the fable differently and changed the status of his protagonist to that of an artisan who, when questioned by the financier, admits to living from hand to mouth. The focus of the story centres on the consequences of an upward change in financial standing: "From the moment he gained what hurts us so" (line 40), the cobbler's sleep was as troubled as the banker's. Though La Fontaine was also dependent on others, he does not apply the fable so openly to himself; for him the problem is not the client status but the personal consequences of possession.

When the story was adapted to musical comedy in France, its moral was often incorporated into the vaudeville at the close. D'Allainval's comedy spells out explicitly what is largely implicit in La Fontaine: "Riches and vain honours/ Are chains that weigh life down" (p. 116). Grégoire's self-criticism at the end of Boutiller's play is that, blinded by riches, he mistook their possession for happiness (p. 56). Similarly in Lourdet de Santerre's ending, Gregoire begins his song with "Gold does not make you happy", while the chorus at the end of his and the cast's succeeding stanzas draws the proverbial conclusion that "Contentment passes riches" (pp. 63–4). That same sentiment, Contentement Passe Richesse, was made the subtitle of the 1815 version of the fable, in which Sans-Quartier, Grégoire's counterpart, sings that "Money’s the root of all evil" (p. 32). Other adaptations shifted their focus away from condemnation of money to the personal quality of contentment. "For my ditties and my sleep no million is needed" is the new final line that Krylov added to the scene where the cobbler returns his money to the tax-farmer. And in the restatement of the fable by Aubépine in Offenbach's operetta the new moral is drawn that "This teaches you to be content with less" (Scene 4).

== Proverbs ==
During the 18th-19th centuries, the term proverbe was being applied to moralised dramatic pieces of one act, which had become popular because they could be played without the need of a stage and allowed for improvisation. Le Savetier et le Financier was one such 'proverb' that, according to her memoirs, was acted in her dining room by Stéphanie Félicité, comtesse de Genlis and two of her friends in pre-revolutionary days. A typical script of this kind furnishes the proverb that serves as its moral. Contentement Passe Richesse by Claude-Louis-Michel de Sacy (1746–94), for example, appeared in 1778 and there the French proverb provides the cobbler with his final words as he confronts the financier and hands him back his money. Similarly, in Le Savetier et le Financier, one of the pieces in the Proverbes dramaticques (1823) of Théodore Leclercq (1777-1851), the cobbler becomes reconciled with his wife after returning the money and they repeat together "Better than wealth is content" at the end.

The proverb itself was common in La Fontaine's time and was recorded as such in a contemporary dictionary. It was first applied as the story's subtitle by Jean Philippe Valette (1699-1750) in his condensations of La Fontaine's fables to fit the tune of popular songs, published in 1746. There the final stanza sums up the moral of the story in the words “Money is no beatitude,/ Believing otherwise is wrong”. But while the fable was initially independent of the proverb, La Fontaine's work soon provided the French language with a popular expression alluding to it. Grégoire was the name given the singing cobbler in the fable, and Insouciant comme Grégoire (carefree as Gregory) was soon applied to those with a similar nature.
