= Balagan =

Temporary building for theater and circus performances

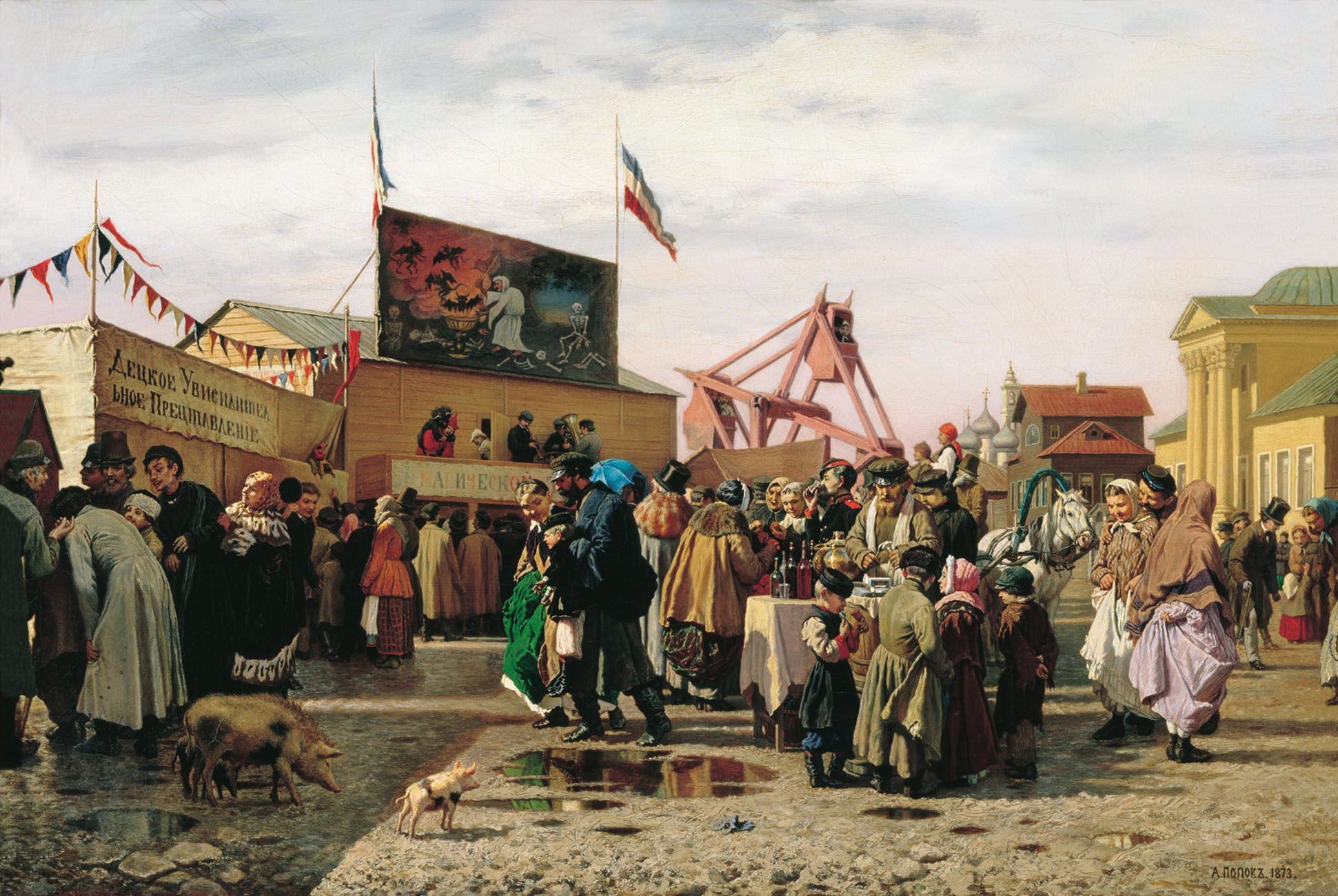
Andrei Popov, "Balagans in Tula during Holy Week", 1873.

In the history of Russia, balagans (Russian: балаган from Persian: بالاخانه, balaχanä, "balcony", "upper room") were temporary structures for seasonal theatrical performances during major holidays or fairs. (Note: The Russian word has also meanings of a storage of goods, as well as a hunter's hut. From its performance meaning, the word may be used derisiely for something noisy and messy.) Balagans were set up in town/city squares. Often balagan shows were of comical character. They could also include freak shows.
