= The Travellers and the Plane Tree =

Fable by Aesop

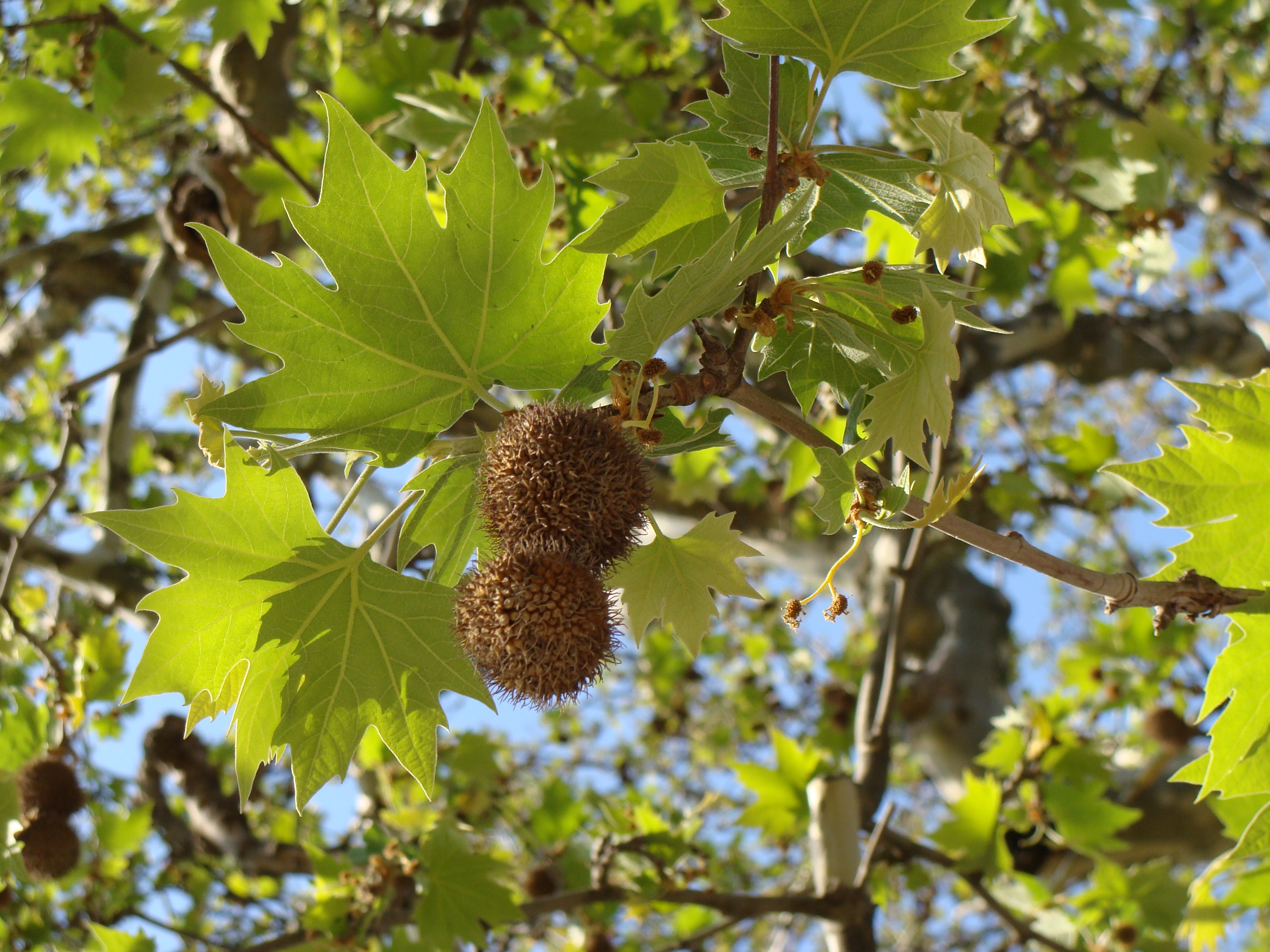
The 'useless' fruits of the plane tree

The Travellers and the Plane Tree is one of Aesop's Fables, numbered 175 in the Perry Index. It may be compared with The Walnut Tree as having for theme ingratitude for benefits received. In this story two travellers rest from the sun under a plane tree. One of them describes it as useless and the tree protests at this view when they are manifestly benefiting from its shade.

The historian Plutarch quotes Themistocles as applying the fable to himself, saying 'that the Athenians did not honour him or admire him, but made, as it were, a sort of plane-tree of him; sheltered themselves under him in bad weather, and as soon as it was fine, plucked his leaves and cut his branches.' But the fable was not included in collections of Aesop's fables in the rest of Europe until the 19th century. One of the first to do so in French was Baron Goswin de Stassart, who included it in his collection of fables, published in 1818 and many times reprinted. There he transposes the scene and makes the travellers a couple of Normandy cider farmers. It was eventually translated by John Henry Keane in 1850 and a prose translation from the Greek appeared in George Fyler Townsend's collection of Aesop's fables in 1867.

A similar story from Ancient China about the survival of a useless tree is told by the 4th century BCE Taoist philosopher Chuang Tzu. Its preservation is owed to the fact that it is good for nothing else but providing shade. A similar theme reappears in the Hecatomythium of Laurentius Abstemius as Fable 12, De arboribus pulchris et deformibus (Trees fair and crooked). In this an entire plantation is felled to build a house, leaving as the survivor the one tree that cannot be used because it is 'knotty and ill-favoured'. Two hundred years later Roger L'Estrange included the story in his Fables of Aesop and Other Eminent Mythologists (1692) and was followed shortly afterwards by Edmund Arwaker in his verse collection, Truth in Fiction (1708). All teach that one should be content with one's looks for 'beauty is often harmful'.
