= Andrei Andreyevich Popov =

Russian painter (1832–1896)

- Андрей Андреевич Попов
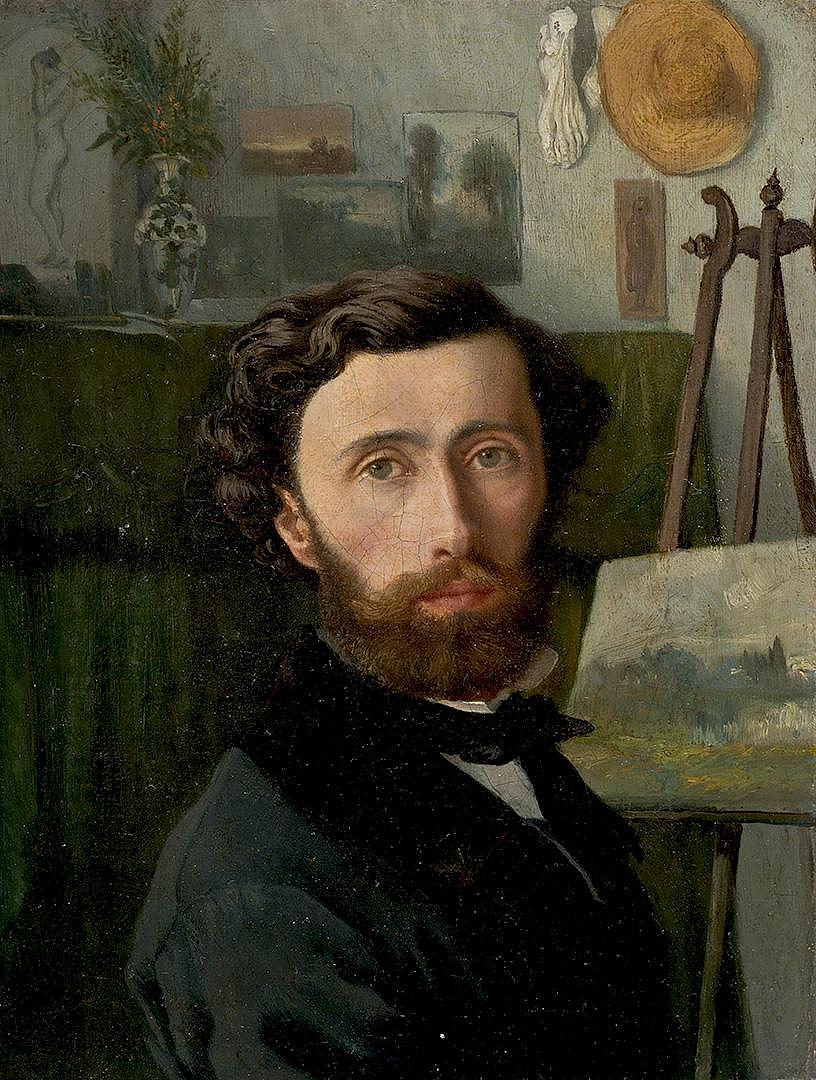
- Self-portrait (c.1864)
- Born: October 13, 1832; Tula, Russia
- Died: 1896 (aged 63–64); Nizhny Novgorod, Russia
- Education: Imperial Academy of Arts (1858)
- Known for: Painting
- Awards: Big Gold Medal of the Imperial Academy of Arts (1860)

Andrei Andreyevich Popov (Russian: Андрей Андреевич Попов; (13 October 1832 – 1896) was a Russian genre painter in the Realist style.

== Biography ==
He received his first art lessons from his father, who was a local icon painter. In 1846, he entered the Imperial Academy of Fine Arts, where he studied with Maxim Vorobiev and Bogdan Willewalde.

In 1849, he was awarded a grant by the Society for the Encouragement of Artists. For an exhibition there in 1857, he had his first critical success with "Demyan's Fish Soup", based on the fable by Ivan Krylov.

From 1858 to 1859, he worked at the Academy as an assistant to Ivan Vistelius (1802–1872), who had been a tutor to the young James McNeill Whistler during his stay in Saint Petersburg.

In 1860, his work, "The Tea Warehouse at the Nizhny Novgorod Fair" earned him a gold medal and the title of "Artist", first-class. He also received a stipend that enabled him to continue his studies in Paris (1863–65) and Rome (1865–67).

He returned to Russia in 1867, initially settling in Kaluga but eventually moving to Nizhny Novgorod. In the 1870s, his health began to decline from a chronic lung condition, possibly a form of tuberculosis, and he was often too weak to work for long periods. As a result, he painted little and had given up entirely by the early 1880s. His last known showing was at the Pan-Russian Exhibition of Art and Industry in Moscow in 1882. He died in poverty.

== Selected paintings ==
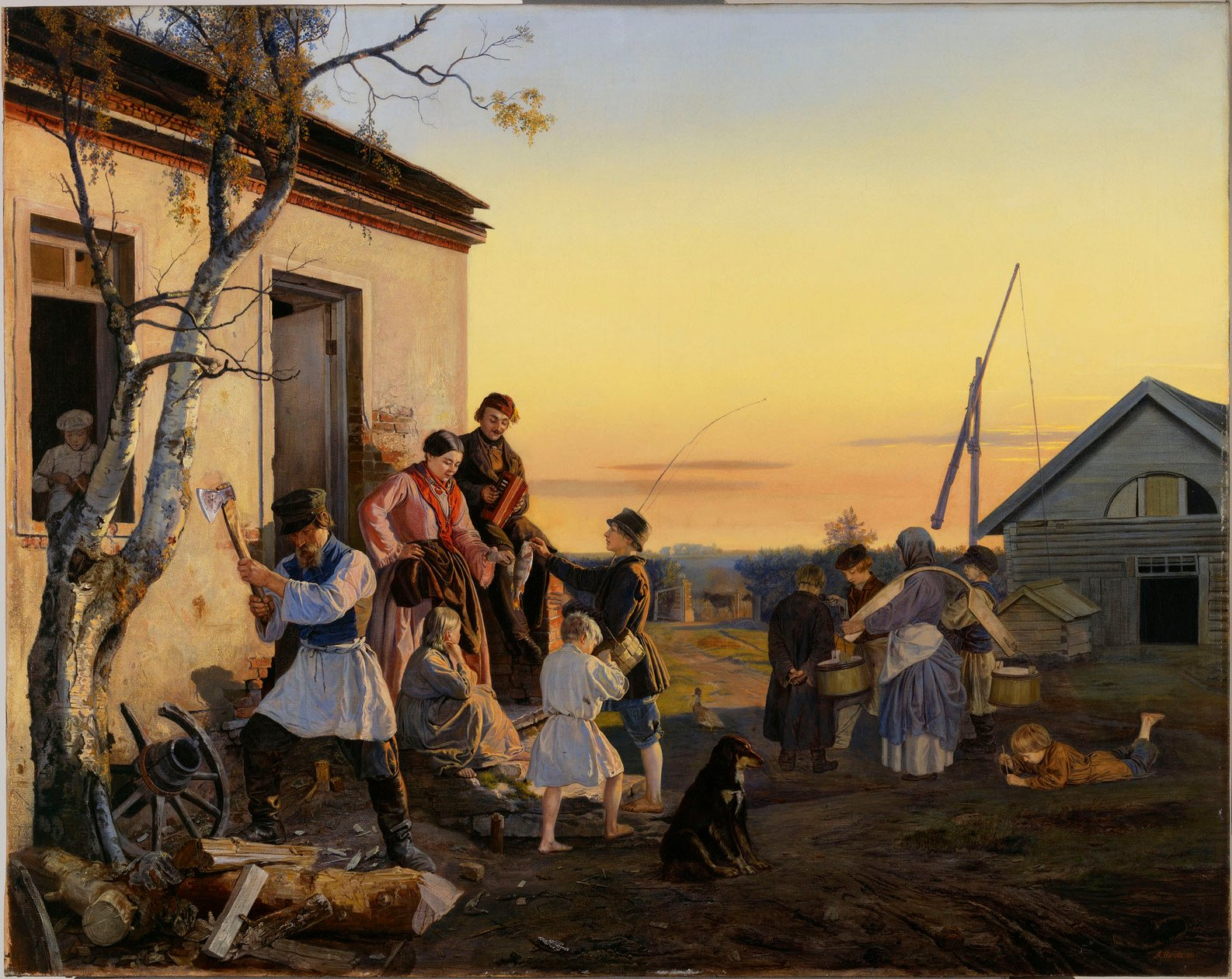
Farmyard

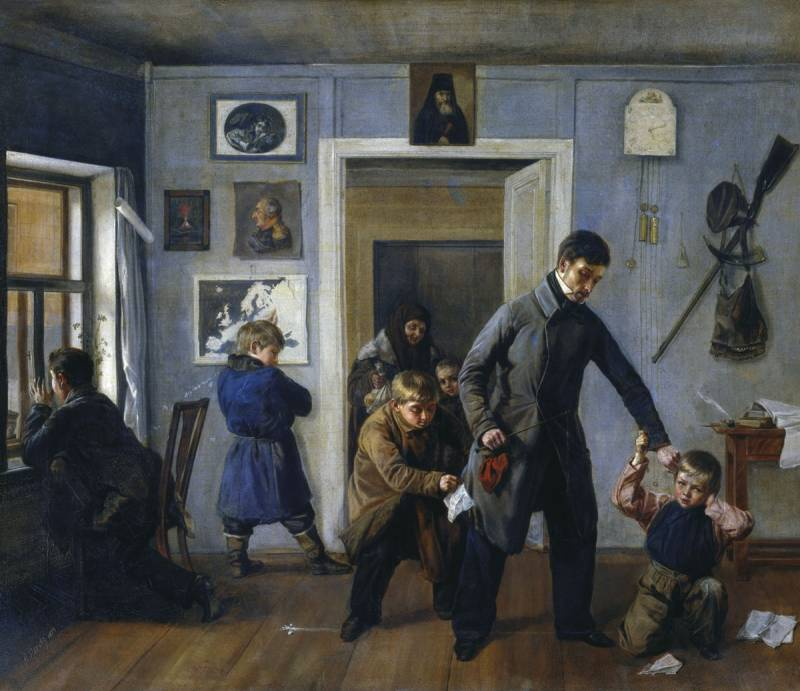
School Teacher

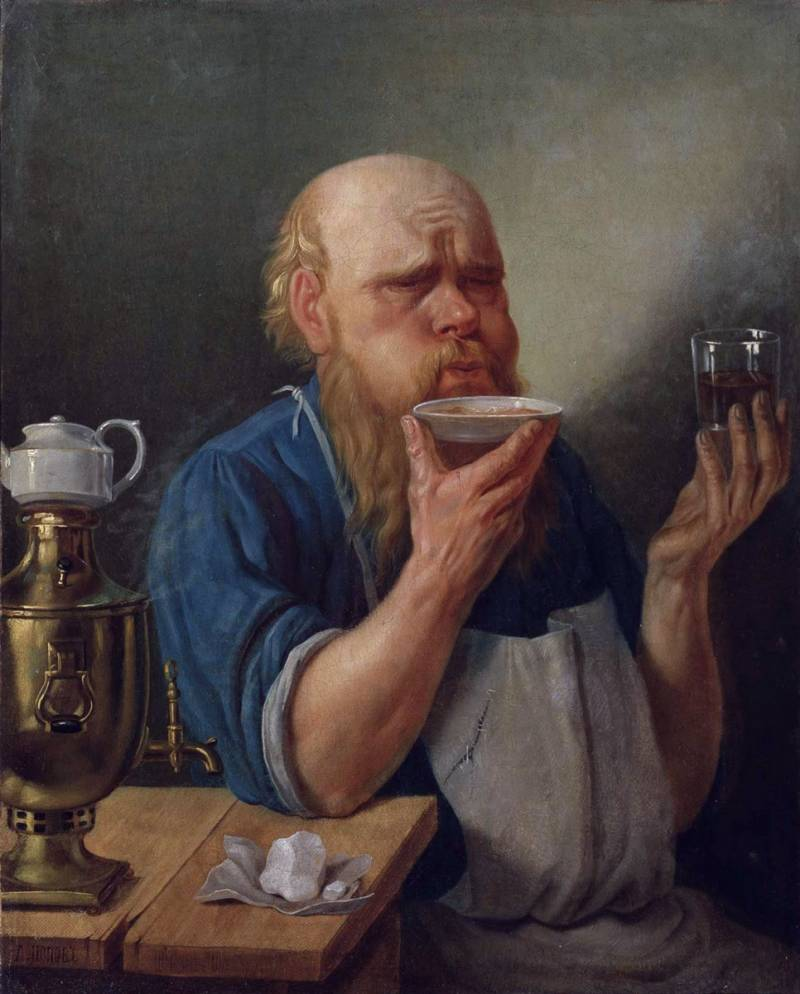
Tea

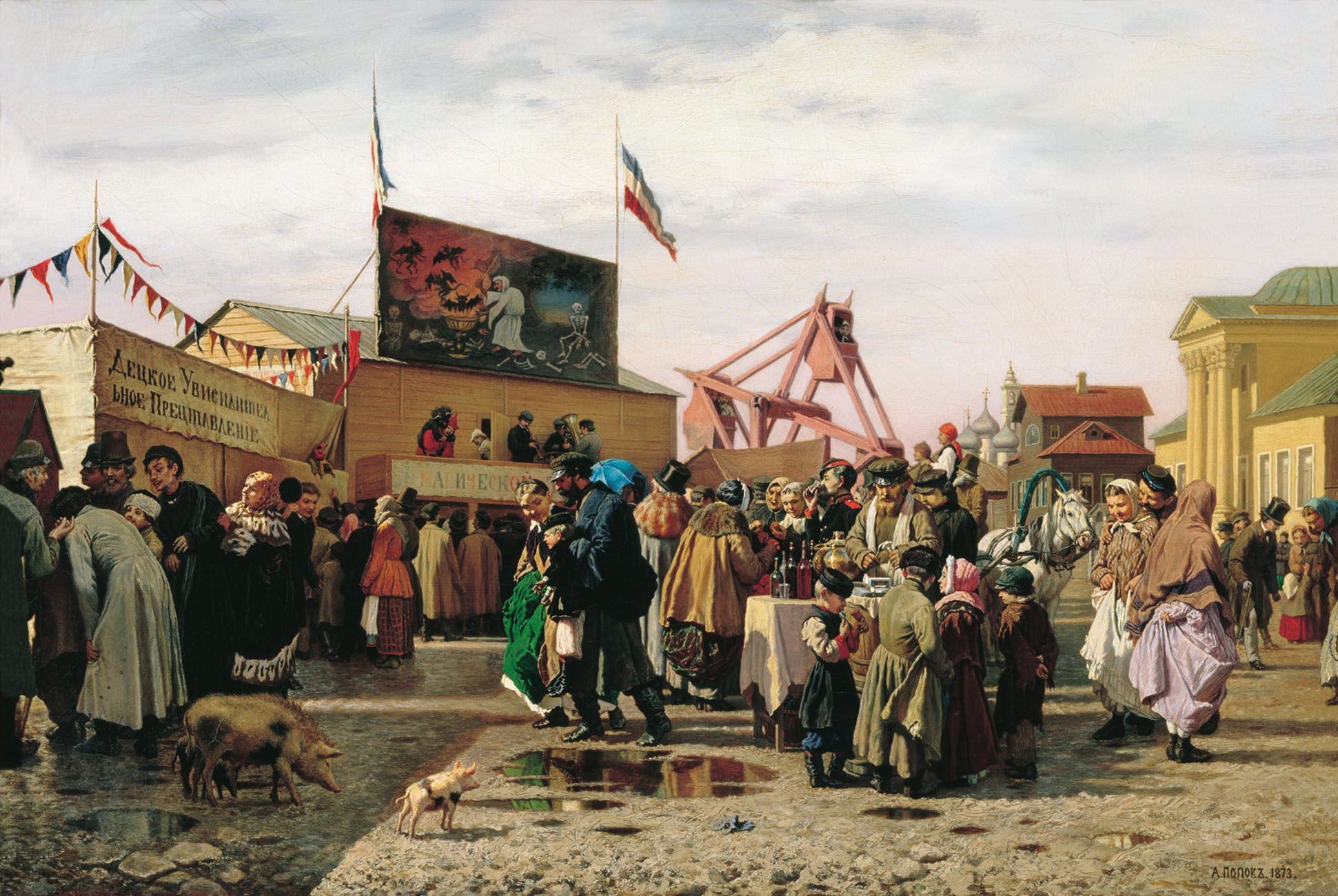
Balagans in Tula During Holy Week
(1873 version)

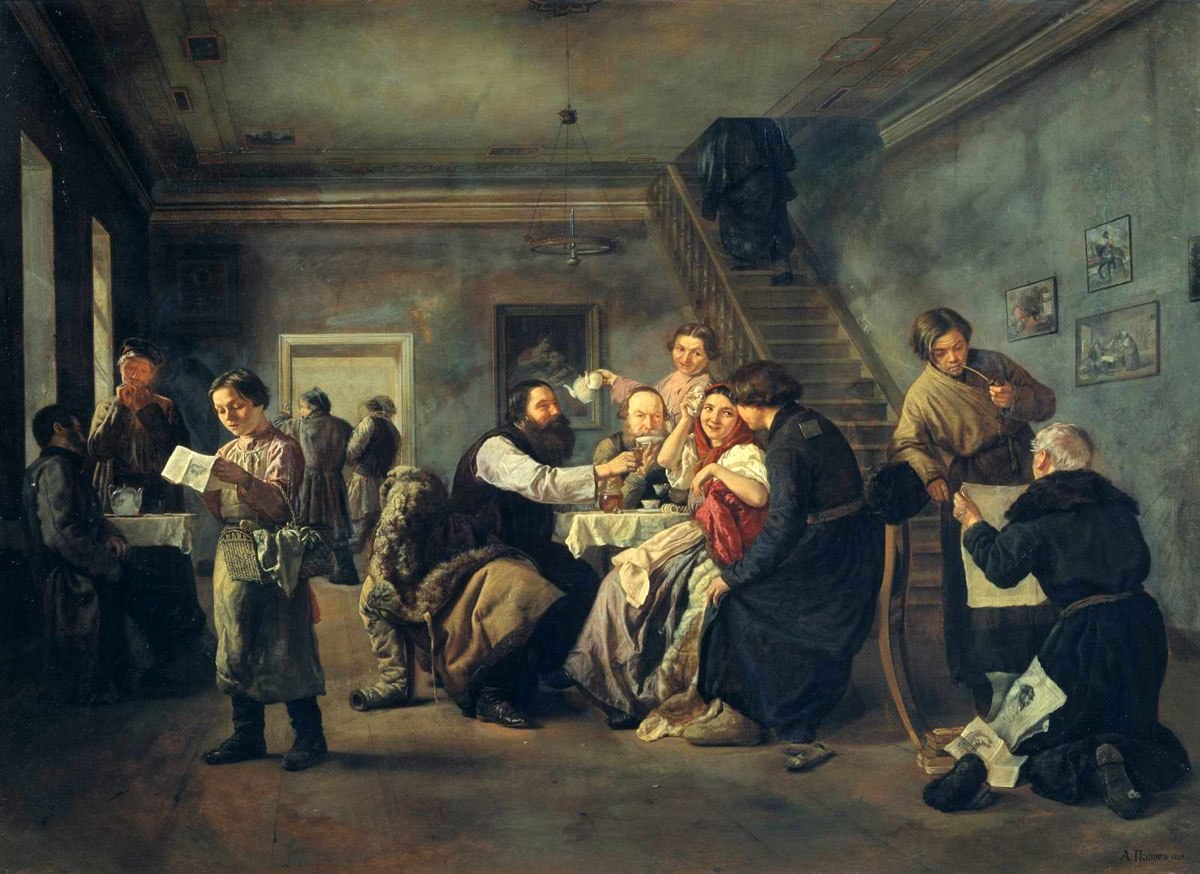
An "Eating House"
