= The Monkey and the Cat =

Fable

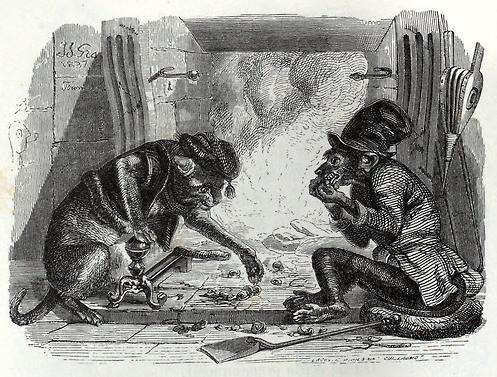
J.J. Grandville's illustration from the 1855 edition of La Fontaine's Fables

The Monkey and the Cat is best known as a fable adapted by Jean de La Fontaine under the title Le Singe et le Chat that appeared in the second collection of his Fables in 1679 (IX.17). It is the source of popular idioms in both English and French, with the general meaning of being the dupe (or tool) of another (e.g., a cat's-paw).

In the fable, a monkey persuades a cat to retrieve chestnuts from the embers of a fire for the two to share, but the monkey quickly eats each chestnut as it is retrieved, and the cat burns its paw in the process. Although there is no evidence that the story existed before the 15th century, it began to appear in collections of Aesop's Fables from the 17th century but is not included in the Perry Index. Usage of the "cat's paw" idiom and reference to the fable have been particularly employed in (although not limited to) political contexts.

== The fable ==
In La Fontaine's telling, Bertrand the monkey persuades Raton the cat to pull chestnuts from the embers amongst which they are roasting, promising him a share. As the cat scoops them from the fire one by one, burning his paw in the process, the monkey gobbles them up. They are disturbed by a maid entering and the cat gets nothing for its pains.

=== As a source of modern idioms ===
It is from this fable that the French get their idiom Tirer les marrons du feu, meaning to act as someone's dupe or, deriving from that, to benefit from the dirty work of others. It is also the source of the English idiom 'a cat's paw', defined in the Merriam-Webster Dictionary as 'one used by another as a tool'. It is also the source of the English expression "to pull someone's chestnuts out of the fire" (succeed in a hazardous undertaking for someone else's benefit).

== History ==
There are earlier idiomatic allusions in 15th century Burgundian sources. Jean Miélot records the saying c'est un bon jeu de chat et singe (it's a cat and monkey game) in his Proverbes (1456) and there is another apparent reference to the story in a poem in Jean Molinet's Faictz et dictz. In the following century, Jean-Antoine de Baïf has the version faire comme le singe, tirer les marrons du feu avec la patte du chat in his Mimes, enseignements et proverbes (1575) and John Florio includes the saying in his collection of idioms Second Frutes (1591).

However, the earliest surviving texts relating the story date from the mid-16th century and some of these have a puppy in place of a cat as the monkey's victim. Johannes Sambucus reports it as happening recently in the Dutch town of Bergen op Zoom in his Emblemata (1564). The Latin poem there continues, 'A small monkey gave us an example noteworthy and amusing for its cunning. For, when he saw the chestnuts buried in the hearth, he began to brush the ash aside but, afraid of the burning coals, he suddenly seized the foot of a sleeping puppy and stole it out.' The same story involving a sleeping dog appeared in other emblem books, including the Choice of Emblemes by the English poet Geoffrey Whitney (1586), who draws a political lesson from it in common with the other emblematists:

Which shewes, when as ambition fowle doth prick
The hartes of kinges, then there is no remorce,
But oftentimes, to aunswere theire desire,
The subjectes feele both famine, sworde and fire.

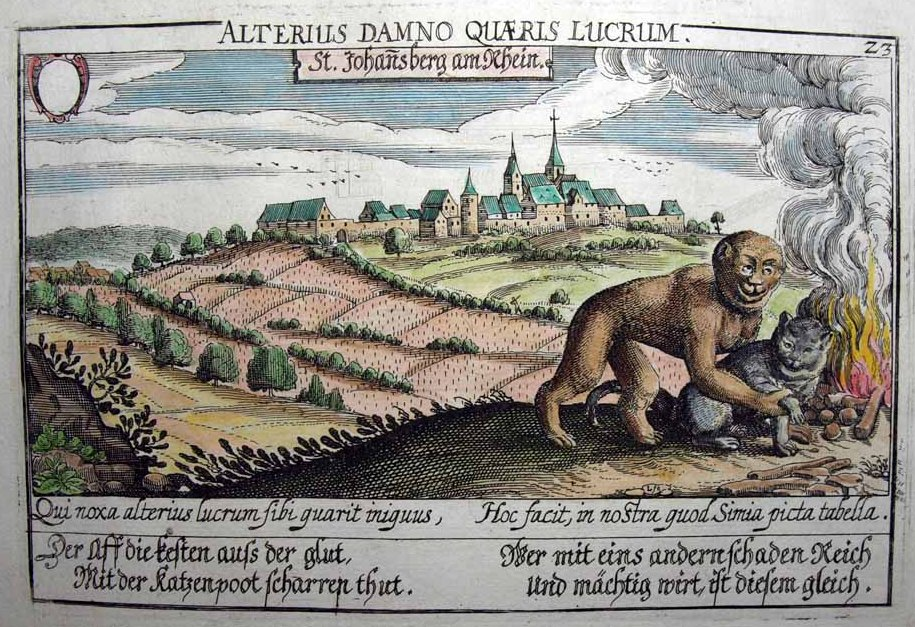
An adaptation of Gheeraert's figure illustrating an engraving of the Schloss Johannisberg vineyards.

A version in which a cat figures is in Marcus Gheeraerts the Elder's illustrated book of fables, De warachtighe fabulen der dieren (True animal fables, Bruges, 1567), with Flemish verse provided by the foremost Netherlandic emblematist Edewaerd de Dene. A French version of the Fabulen was published in 1578 under the title Esbatement moral des animaux. Gheeraert's figure had a number of adaptations in the following century. The Dutch poet Joost van den Vondel published an emblematic collection based on his prints, Vorstelijke Warande der Dieren (Princely pleasure-ground of beasts, Amsterdam 1617), in which the poem Den aap en de katte appears. In England the scene was reused as one of twelve circular engravings, intended for trenchers, made in 1630–36. The text around the edge of the picture reads: "The Monkey seing nuts in fire Doth force the Cat to plucke them neir; Which showeth the Envious doth not care, Whose House do burne so they have share". In Germany it was incorporated into a view of the Schloss Johannisberg wine estate in Daniel Meisner's Thesaurus Philopoliticus (later known as the Sciographia Cosmica) of 1623. In this combination of the Emblem book and collection of town plans, the scene of the fable takes place on the lower right and is accompanied by verses illustrating the Latin moral, Alterius Damno Quaeris Lucrum (Another is duped to benefit the greedy).

Elsewhere in Europe, the monkey and cat version appears in Simone Majoli's Latin work Dies caniculares (1588), where it is told of the antics of the pet monkey of Pope Julius II at the start of the century; a little later the story appeared as Un Singe et un Chat in Philippe Deprez's collection of a hundred verse fables, Le Théâtre des animaux (Paris, 1595). It is from one or other of these last two that La Fontaine is said to have adapted his story. Even before he popularised it, the earlier version had been used by two artists: the Roman painter Tommaso Salini and the Dutch animal painter Abraham Hondius. Both of these illustrate the detail that La Fontaine chose to modify, in which the monkey uses the cat's paw to poke out the chestnuts against its will. A third version of the story, yet again quoted as happening recently, was contained in Gemelli Careri's Voyage round the world (1695) and related by 'the admiral of the Portuguese fleet in India' as witnessed by him.

One of the channels through which the fable was taken to be Aesop's was its inclusion among the hydraulic statues in the labyrinth of Versailles in 1669. These were accompanied by quatrains by Isaac de Benserade, which subsequently appeared in Les fables d'Ésope, mises en françois, avec le sens moral en quatre vers, & des figures à chaque fable (Aesop's fables in French, with a verse commentary and illustrations, 1709). Here the initial quatrain refers to the version where force is used ('The monkey looks sprightly/ but the cat doesn't take lightly/ having its paw acquired/ to pull chestnuts from the fire') while the prose telling which follows is of La Fontaine's version. The statue accompanied by De Benserade's verse is described in Daniel Bellamy's 18th century description of the labyrinth: 'Upon a shell composed of brass, and supported by a column erected in the antique taste with the same metal, the spectator is amused with the resemblance of a large fire, from whence issues a torrent of water. Here a monkey appears with a smiling countenance, grasping a cat's paw with his own, whilst the latter is seemingly struggling to get loose.'

It was a version in which the monkey uses force that was painted by Edwin Landseer in 1824 and by his 19th century imitator (see the gallery below). When the former painting was put up for auction in January 2011, U.S. Christie's recorded that 'The subject of the present painting is taken from the ancient fable traditionally ascribed to Aesop'. While this is far from true, the fable had been appearing in collections of Aesop's Fables since the 17th century. Where the story is ascribed to Aesop, it is in the version where the monkey forcibly uses the cat's paw. La Fontaine's modified version of 1679 can only be regarded as original for the detail of persuasion rather than compulsion. It was translated by neither of La Fontaine's main 18th century English translators, Bernard de Mandeville (1704) and Charles Denis (1754), but was ascribed to him in the verse Flowers of Fable in 1832. Charles H. Bennett also included the story in his The Fables of Aesop and Others, translated into Human Nature (1857) under the title of "The Cat's Paw". Referring back to the plot of Oliver Twist, Bennett's cat acts as thief's apprentice to the monkey.

== Idiom meaning and use ==
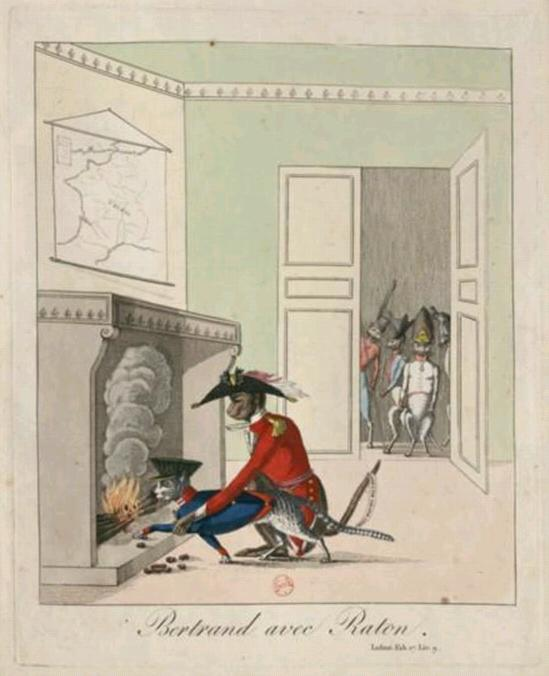
A satirical French view of military glory from Napoleonic times

La Fontaine applies the fable itself directly to statecraft:

No more are the princes, by flattery paid
For furnishing help in a different trade,
And burning their fingers to bring
More power to some mightier king,

This was followed by political cartoonists exploiting the imagery, and metaphor. One English example, dating from 1766 and titled "The Cat's Paw", satirises a political alliance of the time and represents the Earl of Bute as a monkey, using the paw of the feline Earl of Chatham as a tool to extract chestnuts from a fire. Use of the idiom at this date is one of the earliest examples in English. The satirist Peter Pindar (John Wolcot) continued the political use of the fable by including a lengthy reference to it in his ode "To the Chancellor of the Exchequer" (1801), in the context of the argument over Catholic Emancipation. Soon after, the same issue was illustrated in a caricature from 1804 titled "The monkey and the cat's paw, a fable from Esop".

The cat's paw title was to be used once again in a cartoon relating to the political maneuvering that preceded the passing of the English Reform Act in 1832. In this King William IV is the cat, being coaxed by the bewigged Lord Chancellor Henry Brougham, depicted as a monkey seated at his side, to pull the hot iron of reform from a blazing fire. In this case the reference is to La Fontaine's version of the story. Another contemporary source to draw a parallel between the passing of the bill and the fable was the satirical paper Figaro in London. There the claim is made that the Irish members of Parliament halted agitations for wider representation while the Reform Bill was being passed and were now cheated of a similar reward. The political leader Daniel O'Connell is likened to the cat in the fable and the report is followed by the poem, "The grey monkey and the Irish cat", concluding with the lines "And thus 'twill always be, whoever lingers/ About the grate is sure to burn his fingers". The idiom of getting one's fingers burned alludes, according to Brewer's Dictionary of Phrase and Fable, "to taking chestnuts from the fire".

In France the fable was often used to satirise the ambitious sacrificing the life of others for their own ends. The cartoon Bertrand avec Raton s'amusent à tirer les marrons du feu, dating from Napoleonic times, pictures a red uniformed monkey marshall guiding a blue-uniformed infantryman in the task. The theme reappeared in the broadside La Caricature with the title "The monkey and the cat: a military pastime". Another cartoon has a marquis urging a barefoot patriotic workman to take his place on a republican barricade, while chuckling to himself that soon the artistocratic exiles will return with their allies to impose a renewed feudalism. This too is titled "Bertrand et Raton".

The French dramatist Eugène Scribe gave the same title to his social comedy of 1833. Subtitled l'art de conspirer (the art of conspiracy), it has also been translated as 'The school for politicians' and is a reworking of a play of the same name by Louis-Benoît Picard (1805). It is ostensibly based on an episode of Danish history and concerns a bourgeois dupe caught up in political intrigue. In reality it satirises the July Revolution of 1830.

In the Netherlands the words of Vondel's Den aap en de katte were set for a cappella male chorus by Sem Dresden to celebrate the centenary of the Royal Dutch Choir in 1953. In the aftermath of World War II, the closing moral that rulers are careless of the suffering of others in fulfilling their ambition had special resonance.

== Gallery ==
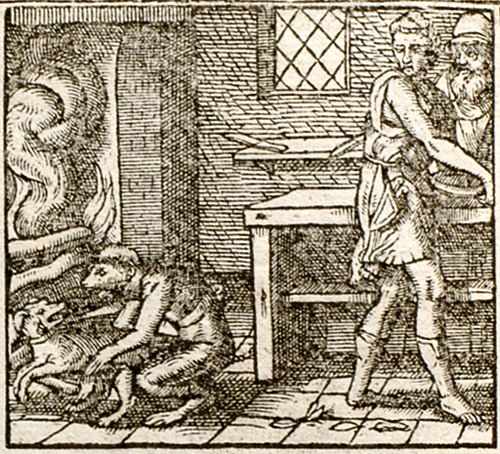
Joannes Sambucus, 1567: the version with a dog

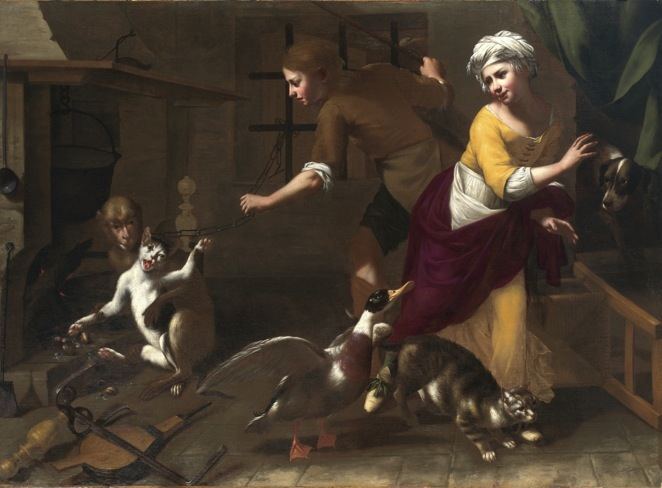
Painting by Tommaso Salini (Mao), 17th century

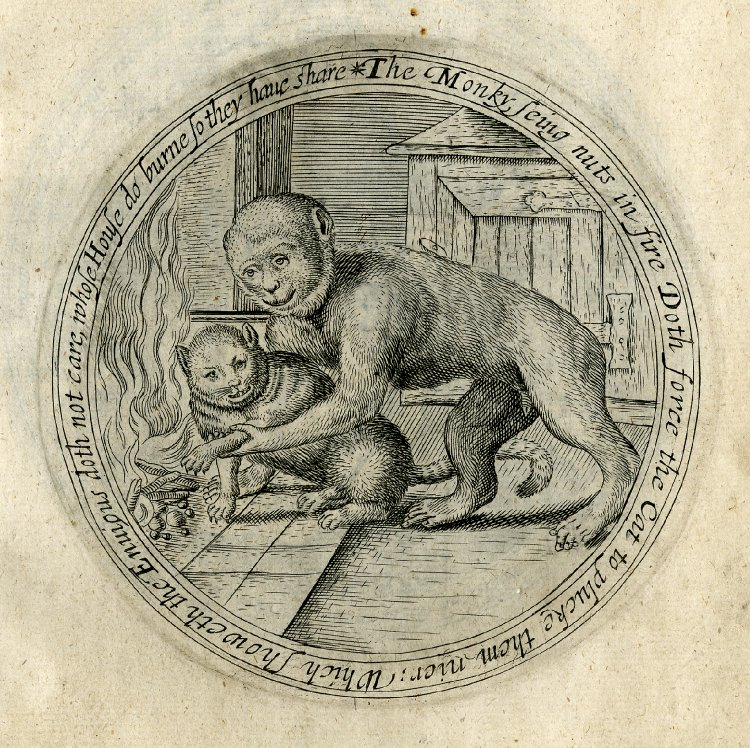
English engraving for trencher, 1630–36, based on a Gheeraerts illustration

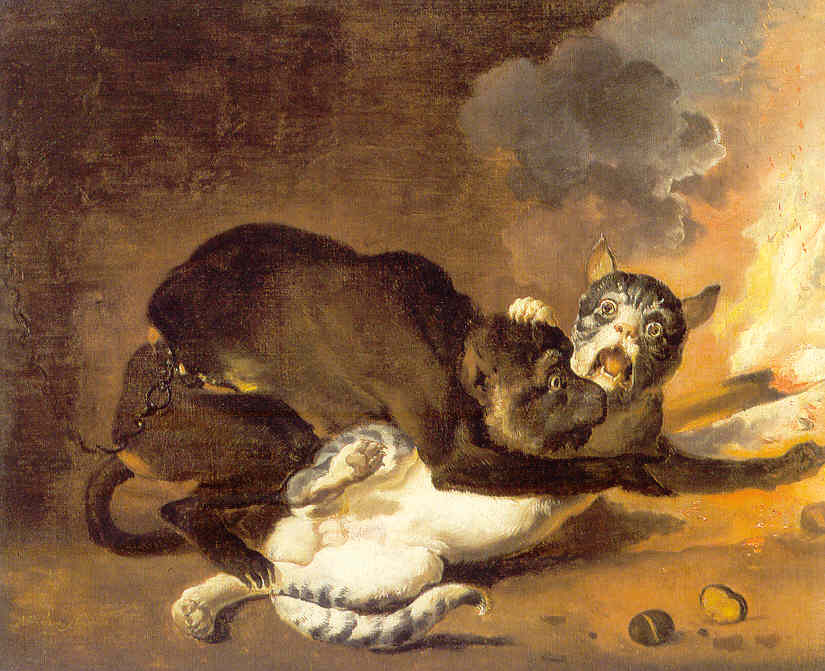
The Monkey and the Cat, 1670, by Abraham Hondius

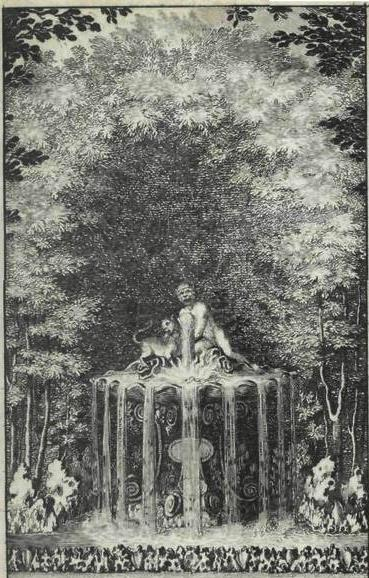
A hydraulic statue in the Versailles labyrinth, 1675

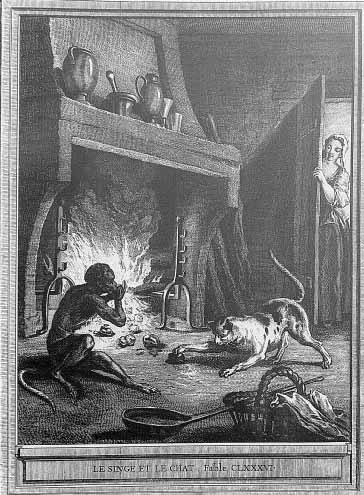
Jean-Baptiste Oudry's illustration of La Fontaine's fable, 1729/34

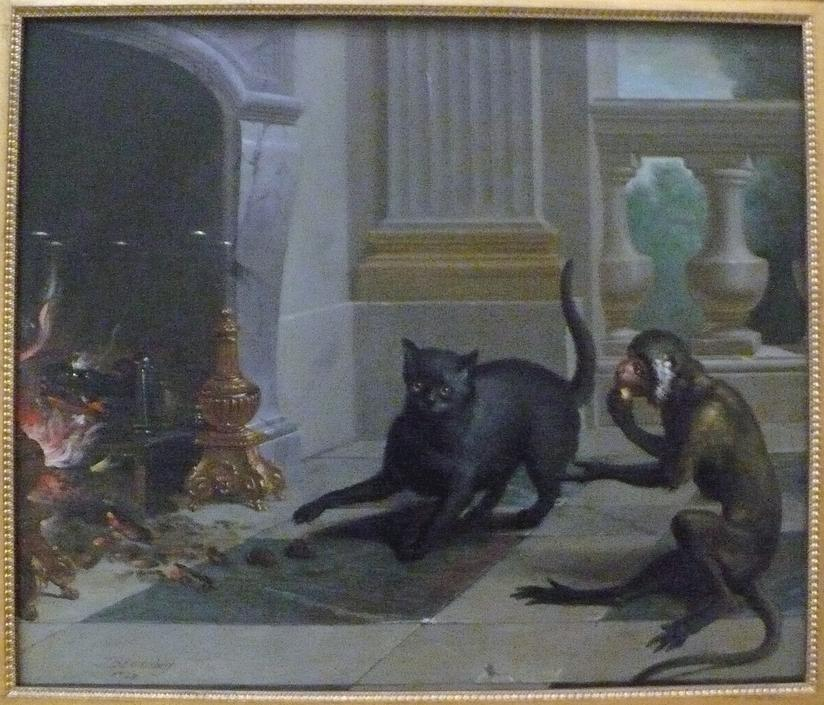
Jean-Baptiste Oudry's painting of La Fontaine's fable, 1740s

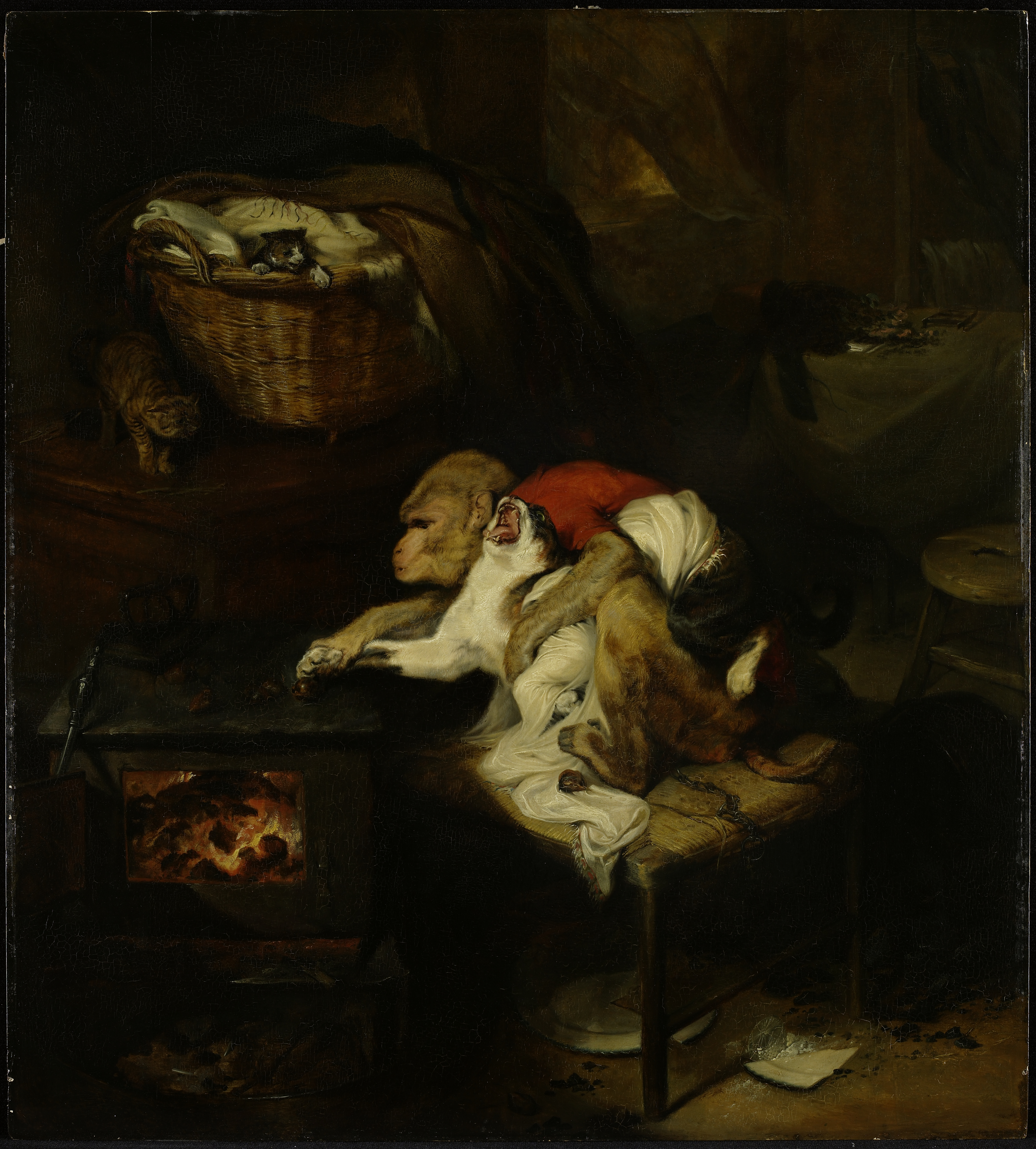
The Cat's Paw, Edwin Henry Landseer, c. 1824

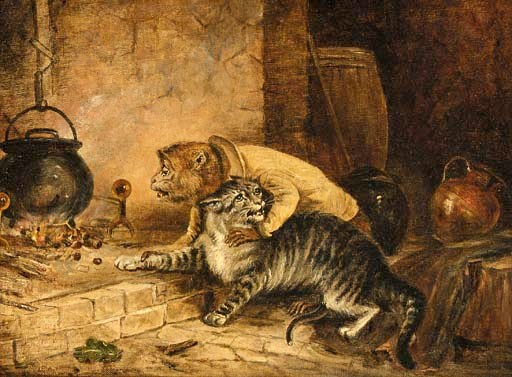
Monkey Business by a follower of Edwin Landseer

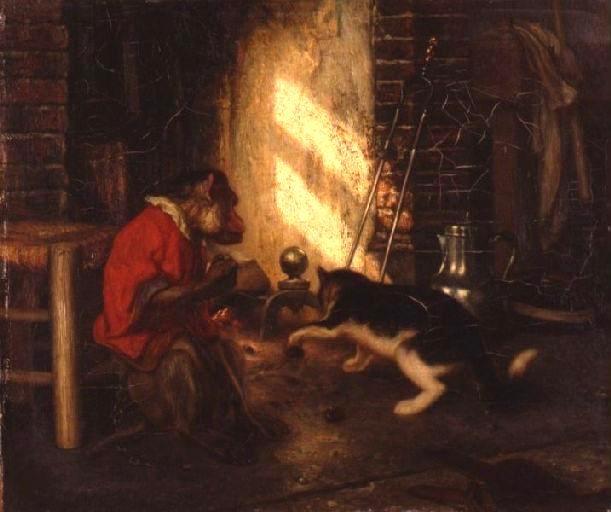
Bernard et Raton, Alexandre-Gabriel Decamps, 1847

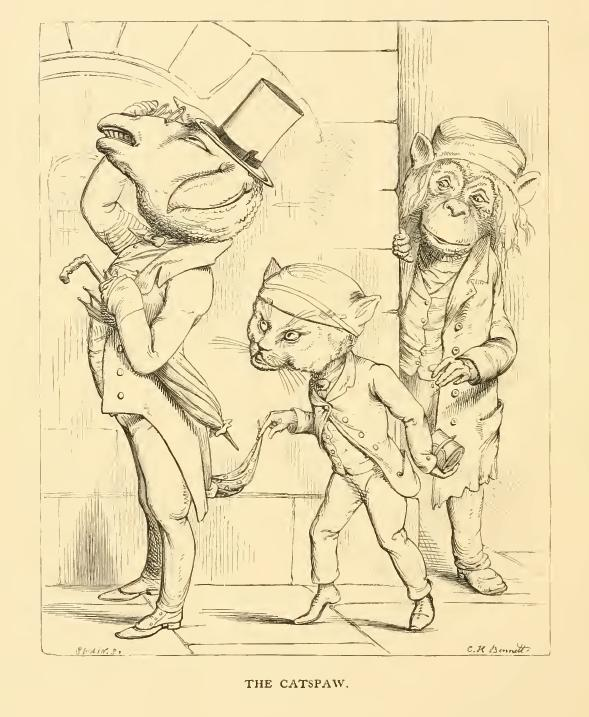
From The Fables of Aesop and Others, Translated into Human Nature, Charles H. Bennett, 1857

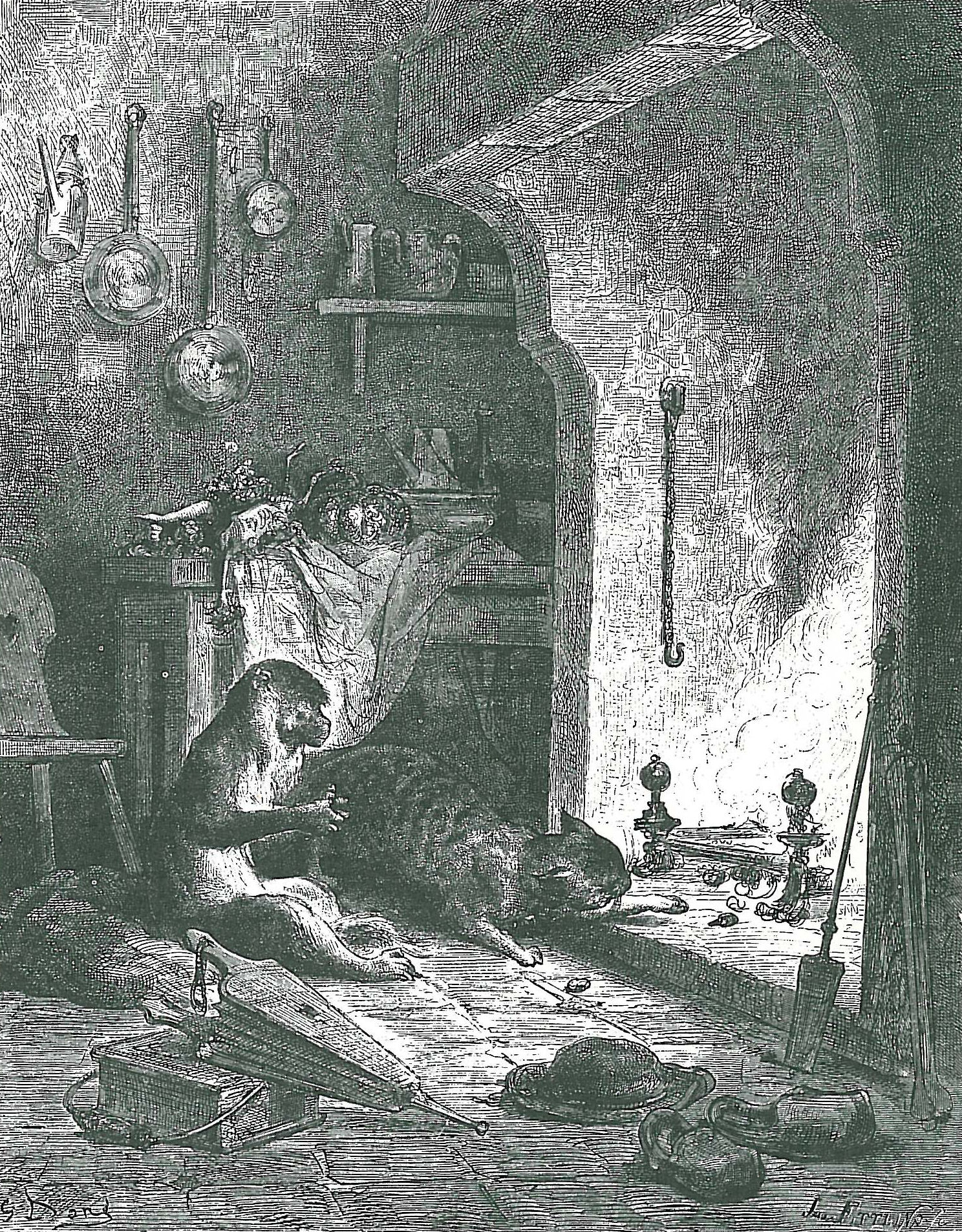
Gustave Doré's illustration of La Fontaine's fable, 1867
