= Labyrinth of Versailles =

Coordinates: 48°48′13″N 02°07′00″E

- Labyrinthe de Versailles
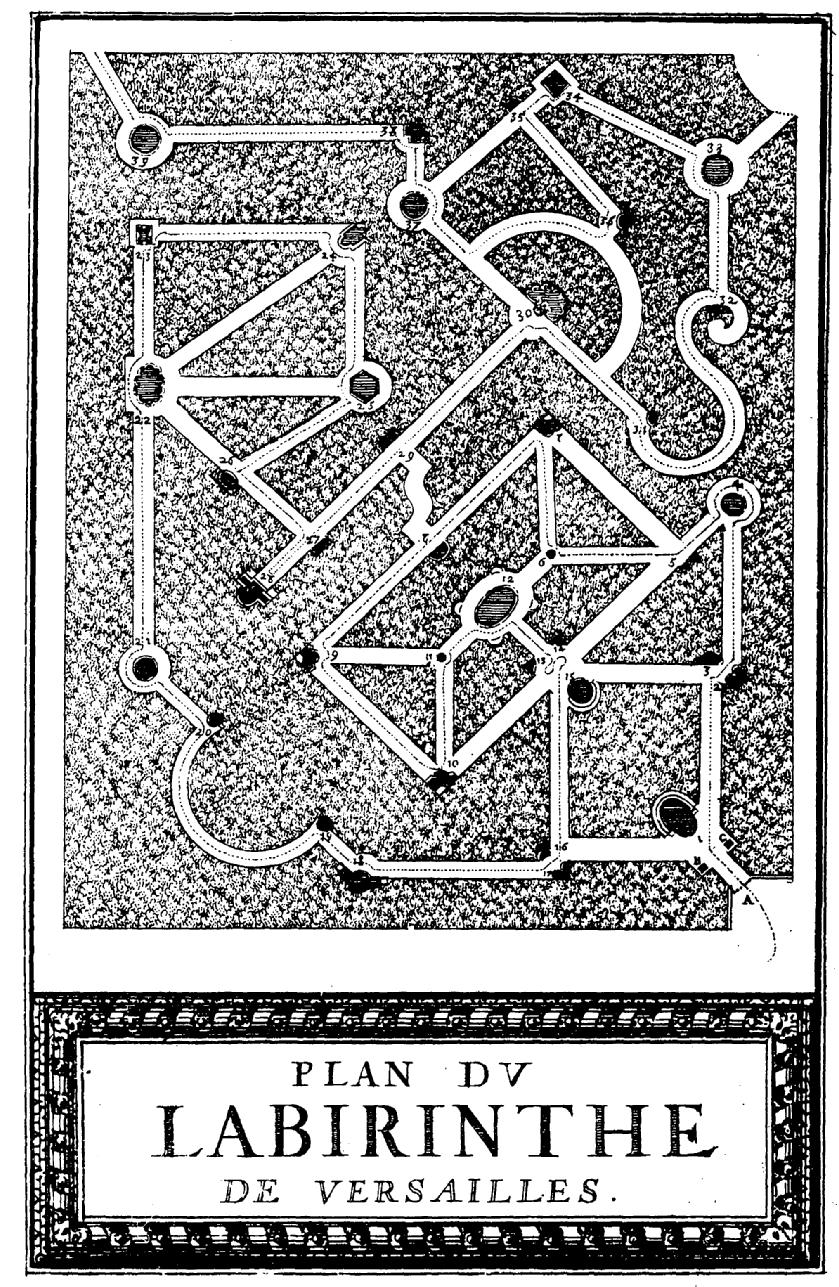
- "Plan du Labirinte de Versailles", printed at the Royal Press, Paris and illustrated by Sébastien Leclerc
- Interactive map of the Labyrinth of Versailles area

General information
- Status: Destroyed
- Type: labyrinth
- Architectural style: fantasy
- Location: Versailles, Kingdom of France
- Groundbreaking: 1665
- Demolished: 1778
- Client: Louis XIV

Technical details
- Grounds: Gardens of Versailles

Design and construction
- Architect: André Le Nôtre
- Other designers: Charles Perrault

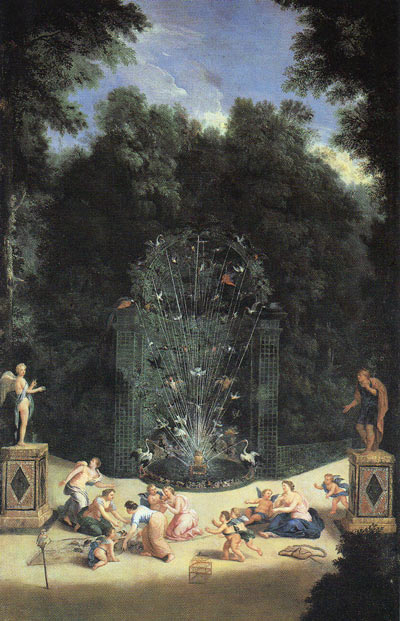
Jean Cotelle the younger's painting of the entrance to the Labyrinth of Versailles; Cupid ('Love') on the left, Aesop on the right.

The labyrinth of Versailles was a hedge maze in the Gardens of Versailles with groups of fountains and sculptures depicting Aesop's Fables. André Le Nôtre initially planned a maze of unadorned paths in 1665, but in 1669, Charles Perrault advised Louis XIV to include thirty-nine fountains, each representing one of the fables of Aesop. Labyrinth The work was carried out between 1672 and 1677. Water jets spurting from the animals mouths were conceived to give the impression of speech between the creatures. There was a plaque with a caption and a quatrain written by the poet Isaac de Benserade next to each fountain. A detailed description of the labyrinth, its fables and sculptures is given in Perrault's Labyrinte de Versailles, illustrated with engravings by Sébastien Leclerc.

In 1778 Louis XVI had the labyrinth removed and replaced by an arboretum of exotic trees planted as an English landscape garden.

== Creation ==
In 1665, André Le Nôtre planned a hedge maze of unadorned paths in an area south of the Latona Fountain near the Orangerie. In 1668 Jean de La Fontaine published his first collection Fables Choisies, dedicated to "Monseigneur" Louis, Grand Dauphin, the six-year-old son of Louis XIV. Although La Fontaine had incurred the royal displeasure, his poems perhaps encouraged Charles Perrault, author of the Mother Goose stories, who the year before had been named senior civil servant in the Superintendence of the King's Buildings, to advise Louis XIV in 1669 to remodel the labyrinth in such a way as to serve the Dauphin's education. Between 1672 and 1677 Le Nôtre redesigned the labyrinth to feature thirty-nine fountains that depicted stories from Aesop's Fables. The sculptors Jean-Baptiste Tuby, Etienne Le Hongre, Pierre Le Gros the Elder, and the brothers Gaspard and Balthazard Marsy worked on these thirty-nine hydraulic sculptures.

Each fountain was accompanied by a plaque on which the fable was printed, with verse written by Isaac de Benserade. It was from these plaques that Louis XIV's son learned to read. In his Fables d'Ésope en quatrains, dont il y en a une partie au labyrinthe de Versailles de Benserade claims that, as well as being the one to choose the fables, it was the King himself who had wanted a quatrain to describe each of them.

Once completed in 1677 the labyrinth contained thirty-nine fountains with 333 painted metal animal sculptures. The water for the elaborate waterworks was conveyed from the Seine by the Machine de Marly, which used fourteen water-wheels driving 253 pumps, some of which worked at a distance of three-quarters of a mile.

== Layout ==
The layout of the maze was unusual, as there was no central goal, and, despite the five-metre-high (16 ft) hedges, allowed glimpses ahead. Jean-Aymar Piganiol de La Force in his Nouvelle description du château et parc de Versailles et de Marly (1702) describes the labyrinth as a "network of allées bordered with palisades where it is easy to get lost." He continues: "At every turn you see a fountain decorated with delicate rocaille, and representing very simply a fable, the subject of which is indicated by a four-line inscription in gold letters on a bronze plate."

Shortly after the labyrinth was completed, Perrault published a description in his Recueil de divers ouvrages en prose et en vers. "At each end of a path," he wrote, "and wherever they cross, there are fountains, so arranged that in whatever place one finds oneself, one sees always three or four and often six or seven of them at once. The basins of these fountains, all different in figure and design, are enriched with fine rock-work and rare shells and for ornamentation have different animals who represent the most charming fables of Aesop. These animals are so well made and lifelike that they seem to be still in the action that they depict; one can even say that they in some way speak the words that the fable attributes to them, since the water that they spout forth at one another seems not only to give them life and action, but serves them also as a voice to express their passions and their thoughts."

== Success ==
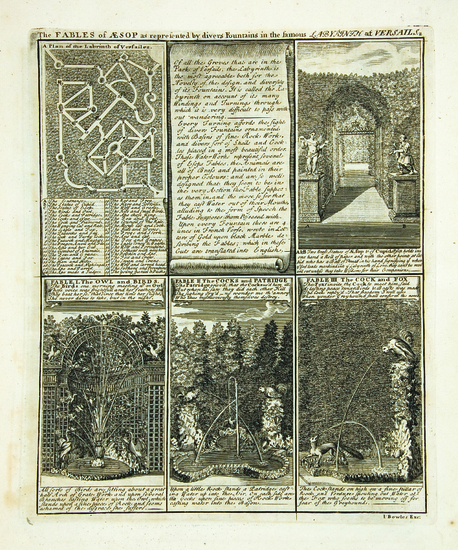
John Bowles (author) guidebook

This labyrinth was so popular, not only with the King and the young Dauphin, but with the nobility and gentry who were allowed to visit the garden, that a guidebook was published, Perrault's Labyrinte de Versailles, which contained the fables, a description of the fountains and the quatrains written by the poet Isaac de Benserade for each fable. It was first published in 1675, then reprinted in 1677 with engravings by Sébastien Leclerc. A third version, in which the engravings by Leclerc were illuminated by Jacques Bailly was produced soon after. The small, pocket-sized books were richly bound in red Morocco leather with stamped gilt decoration. The book was eventually translated into English, appearing twice in 1768, in John Bowles's edition and Daniel Bellamy, the elder's Aesop at Court, with plates engraved by George Bickham the Younger.

The labyrinth contributed greatly to the wonder that the Gardens of Versailles instilled in visitors and diplomats from abroad. An illustrated guide printed in Amsterdam in 1682 praised Le Nôtre's work saying, "Amongst all these works there is nothing more admirable and praiseworthy than the Royal Garden at Versailles, and, in it, the Labyrinth... The Turnings and Windings, edged on both sides with green cropt hedges, are not at all tedious, by reason that at every hand there are figures and water-works representing the mysterious and instructive fables of Aesop".

The composer Marin Marais wrote a piece for viola da gamba called "Le Labyrinthe." Titon du Tillet admired it: "The piece from his Fourth Book, titled Le Labyrinthe, in which after roaming through various keys, touching diverse dissonances, and underlining, first with sombre tones and later with lively and sprightly ones, the uncertainty of a man lost in a labyrinth, the composer manages happily to find the way out at last and finishes with a graceful and natural sounding Chaconne."

Plan of the gardens in 1746

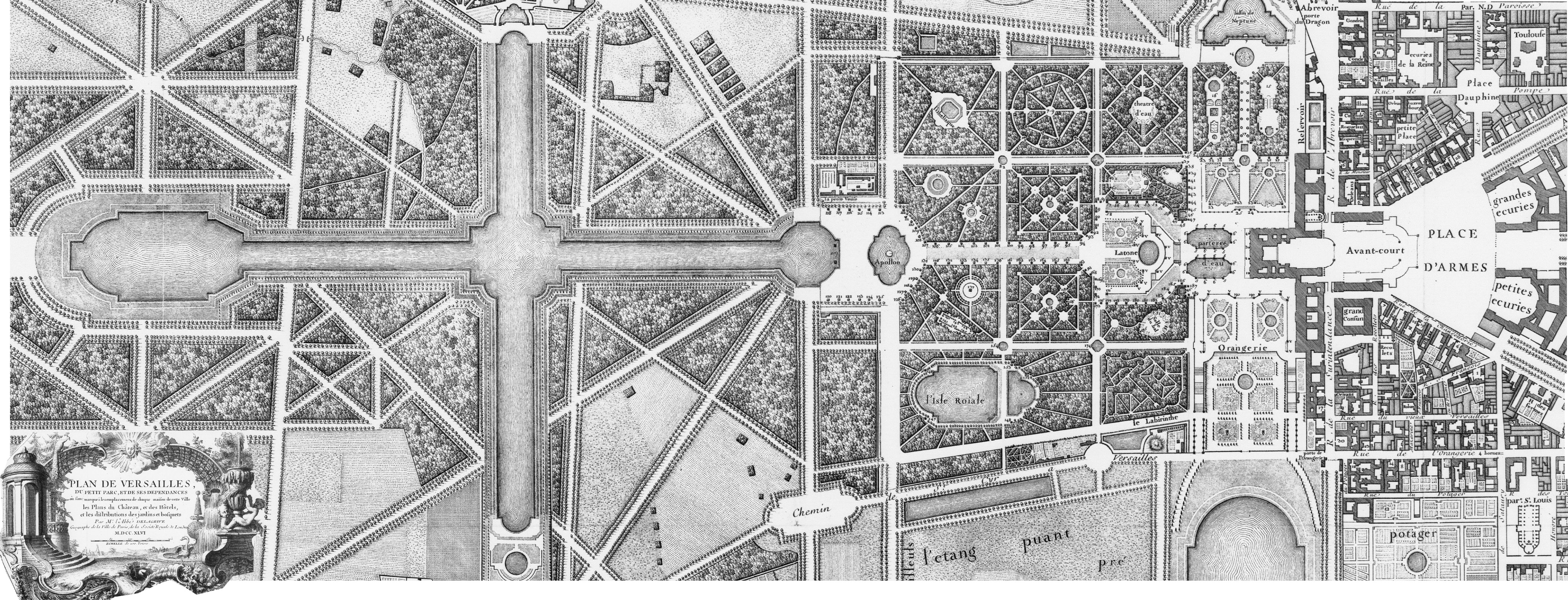
Gardens and palace of Versailles in 1746 showing the labyrinth, by the abbot Delagrive

== Aesop and Love ==
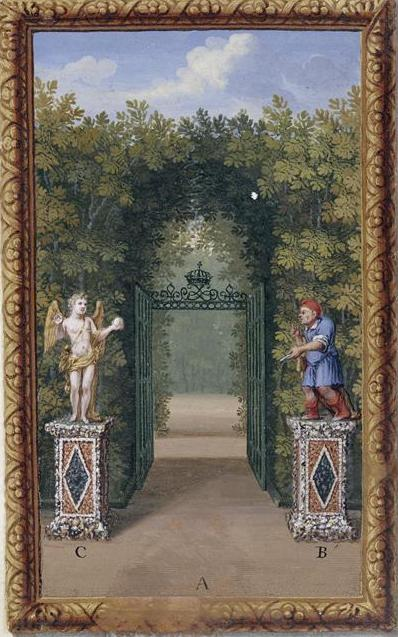
From Jacques Bailly's Le Labyrinthe de Versailles. Shows entrance (A), statues of Aesop (B) and Cupid (C).

Two statues were placed at the entrance to the labyrinth ("A" in the plan), one of Aesop by Le Gros ("B") holding a scroll of paper and the other of Love or Cupid by Tuby ("C") holding a ball of thread, like Ariadne's. Labyrinth

Perrault writes of the two figures: "Aesop has a roll of paper which he shows to Love who has a ball of thread, as if to say that if God has committed men to troublesome labyrinths, there is no secret to getting out as long as Love is accompanied by wisdom, of which Aesop in his fables teaches the path."

For Michel Conan, the maze's design "invited all visitors to give first-person attention" to their movements, and the statues "advised that unless they pondered their choices they might fail to find their way through the labyrinth." For him, the labyrinth, as a metaphor for life, "encouraged self-reflection and a search for a personal code of conduct", with the dialogue between Cupid and Aesop at the entrance emphasising this:

Cupid:

Yes, I can now close my eyes and laugh: with this thread I'll find my way.

Aesop:

Love, that slender thread might get you lost: the slightest shock could break it.

== Destruction ==
Citing repair and maintenance costs, Louis XVI ordered the labyrinth destroyed in 1778. In its place, an arboretum of exotic trees was planted as an English-styled garden. Rechristened Bosquet de la Reine, it would be in this part of the garden that an episode of the Affair of the Diamond Necklace, which compromised Marie Antoinette, transpired in 1785. In the reserve collections of the Musée national des châteaux de Versailles et de Trianon, there remain only thirty-four fragments of the fountains, as well as the statues of L'Amour and Aesop.

== The fables in the labyrinth ==
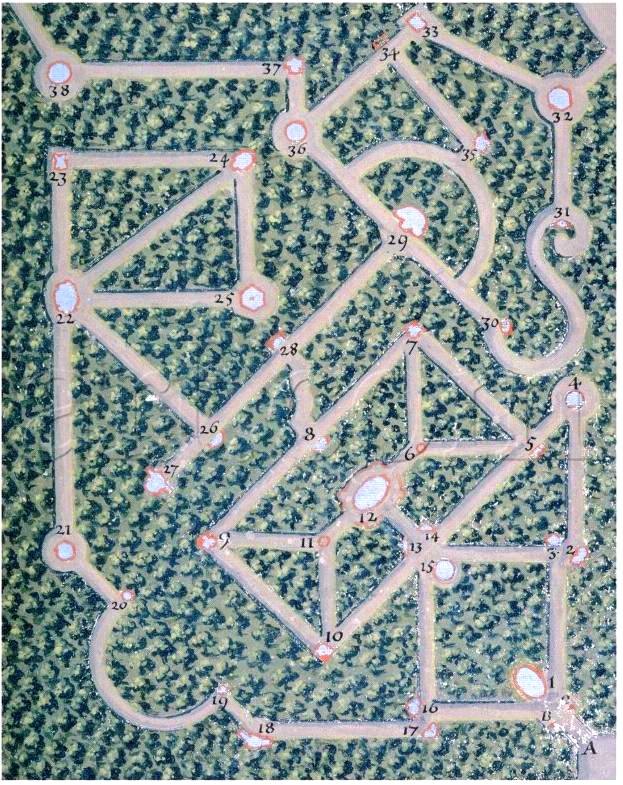
Plan of the Labyrinth of Versailles, with the fountains (numbered)

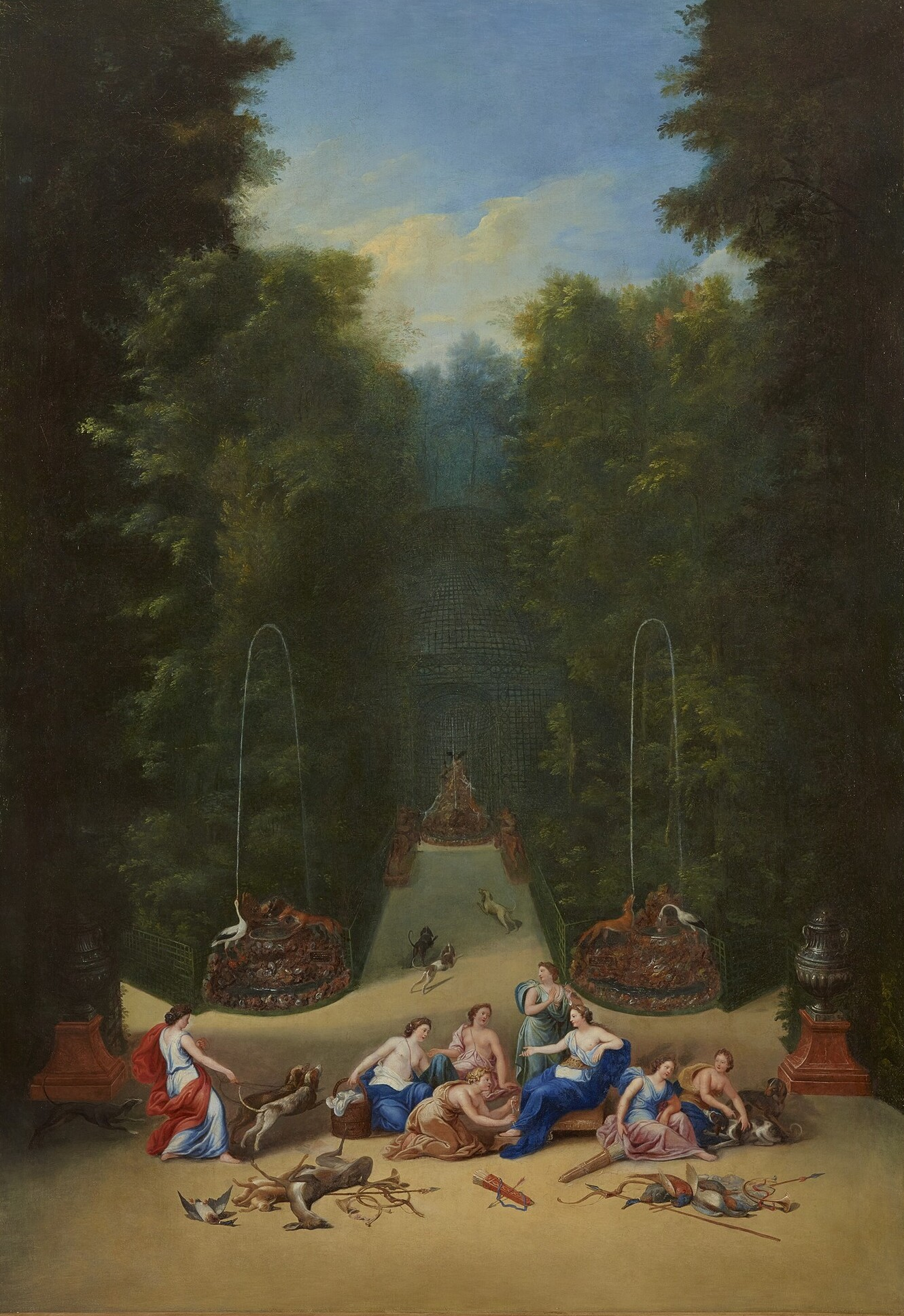
"Vue de l'intérieur du bosquet du Labyrinthe" by Jean Cotelle, ca. 1693

1. Owl and Birds (Le duc et les oiseaux, Perry 614)
2. Cocks and Partridge (Les coqs et la perdrix, Perry 23)
3. The Cock, the Dog and the Fox (Le coq et le renard, Perry 252)
4. The Cock and the Jewel (Le coq et le diamant, Perry 503)
5. The Cat and the Mice (Le chat pendu et les rats, Perry 79)
6. The Eagle and the Fox (L'aigle et le renard Perry 1)
7. The Jay and the Peacock (Les paons et le geai, Perry 472)
8. The Cock and the Turkey-cock (Le coq et le coq d'Inde)
9. The Peacock and the Jackdaw (Le paon et la pie, Perry 219)
10. The Viper and the File (Le dragon, l'enclume et la lime, Perry 93)
11. The Ape's Twin Offspring (Le singe et ses petits, Perry 218)
12. The Bat (Le combat des oiseaux, Perry 566)
13. Hen, Chicks and Kite (La poule et les poussins, Perry 601)
14. The Fox and the Stork, first part (Le renard et la grue, Perry 426)
15. The Fox and the Stork, second part (La grue et le renard, Perry 426)
16. The Peacock complains to Juno about his Voice (Le paon et le rossignol, Perry 509)
17. The Parrot and the Ape (Le perroquet et le singe)
18. The Wolf and the Fox before Judge Ape (Le singe juge, Perry 474)
19. The Frog and the Mouse (Le rat et la grenouille, Perry 384)
20. The Tortoise and the Hare (Le lièvre et la tortue, Perry 226)
21. The Wolf and the Heron (Le loup et la grue, Perry 156)
22. The Kite and the Birds (Le milan et les oiseaux)
23. The Ape and the Fox (Le singe roi, Perry 81)
24. The Fox and the Goat in the Well (Le renard et le bouc, Perry 9)
25. The Mice in Council (Le conseil des rats, Perry 613)
26. The Frogs ask Zeus for a King (Les Grenouilles et Jupiter, Perry 44)
27. The Monkey and the Cat (Le singe et le chat, not in Perry)
28. The Fox and the Grapes out of Reach (Le renard et les raisins, Perry 15)
29. The Eagle and the Beetle (L'aigle, le lapin et l'escarbot, Perry 3)
30. The Wolf and the Porcupine (Le loup et le porc-épi)
31. The Snake with several Heads (Le serpent à plusieurs têtes)
32. The Mouse, the Cat and the little Cock (La petite souris, le chat et le cochet)
33. The Kite and the Doves (Le milan et les colombes, Perry 486)
34. The Ape and the Dolphin (Le dauphin et le singe, Perry 73)
35. Fox and Crow (Le renard et le corbeau, Perry 124)
36. The Swan and his Owner (Du cygne et de la grue, Perry 233)
37. The Fox and the Mask (Le loup et la tête, Perry 27)
38. The Snake and the Porcupine (Le serpent et le porc-épic)
39. The Ducks and the Water-Spaniel (Les cannes et le petit barbet)

== Gallery ==
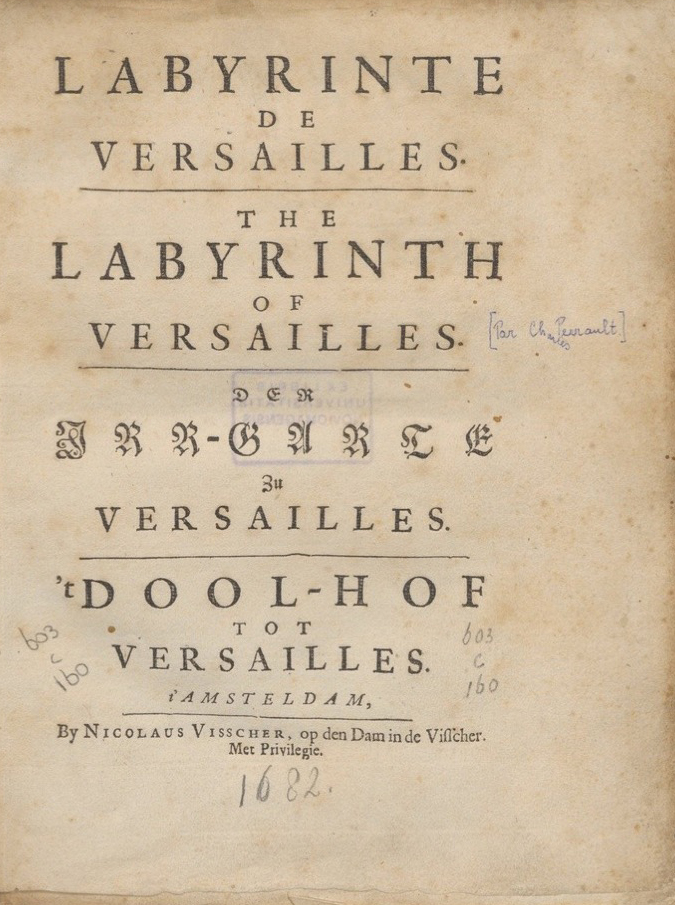
Title page

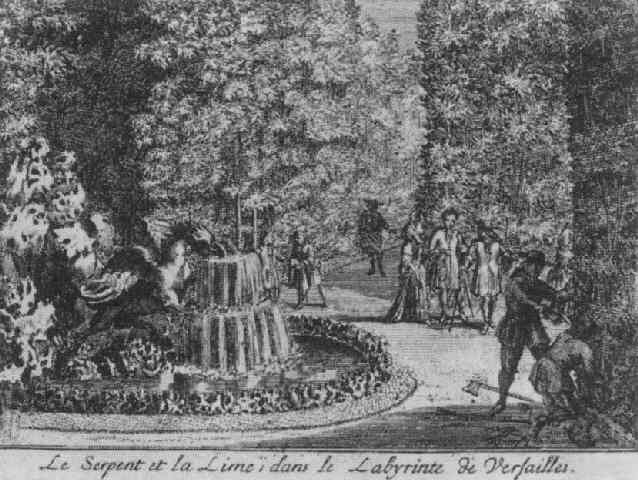
no.10: The Viper and the File (Le Serpent et la Lime:1679)

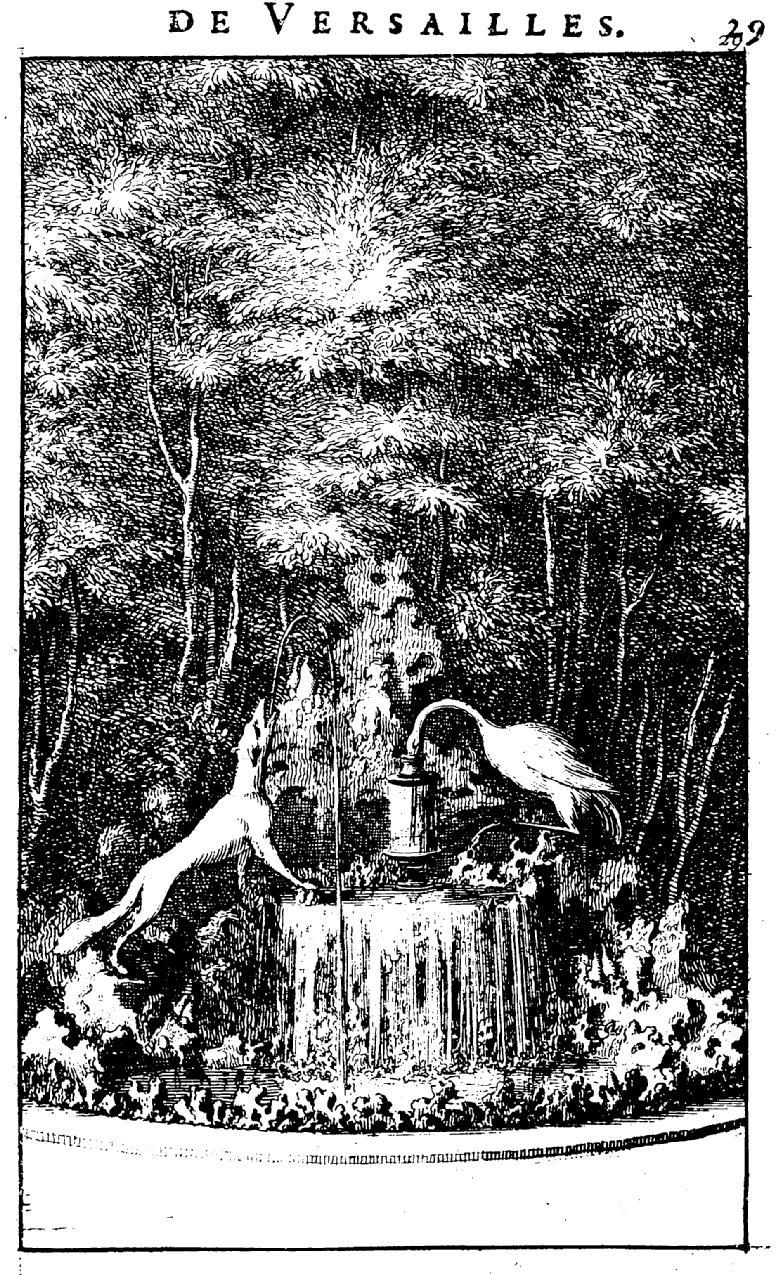
no.14: The Fox and the Crane (Le Renard et le Grue)

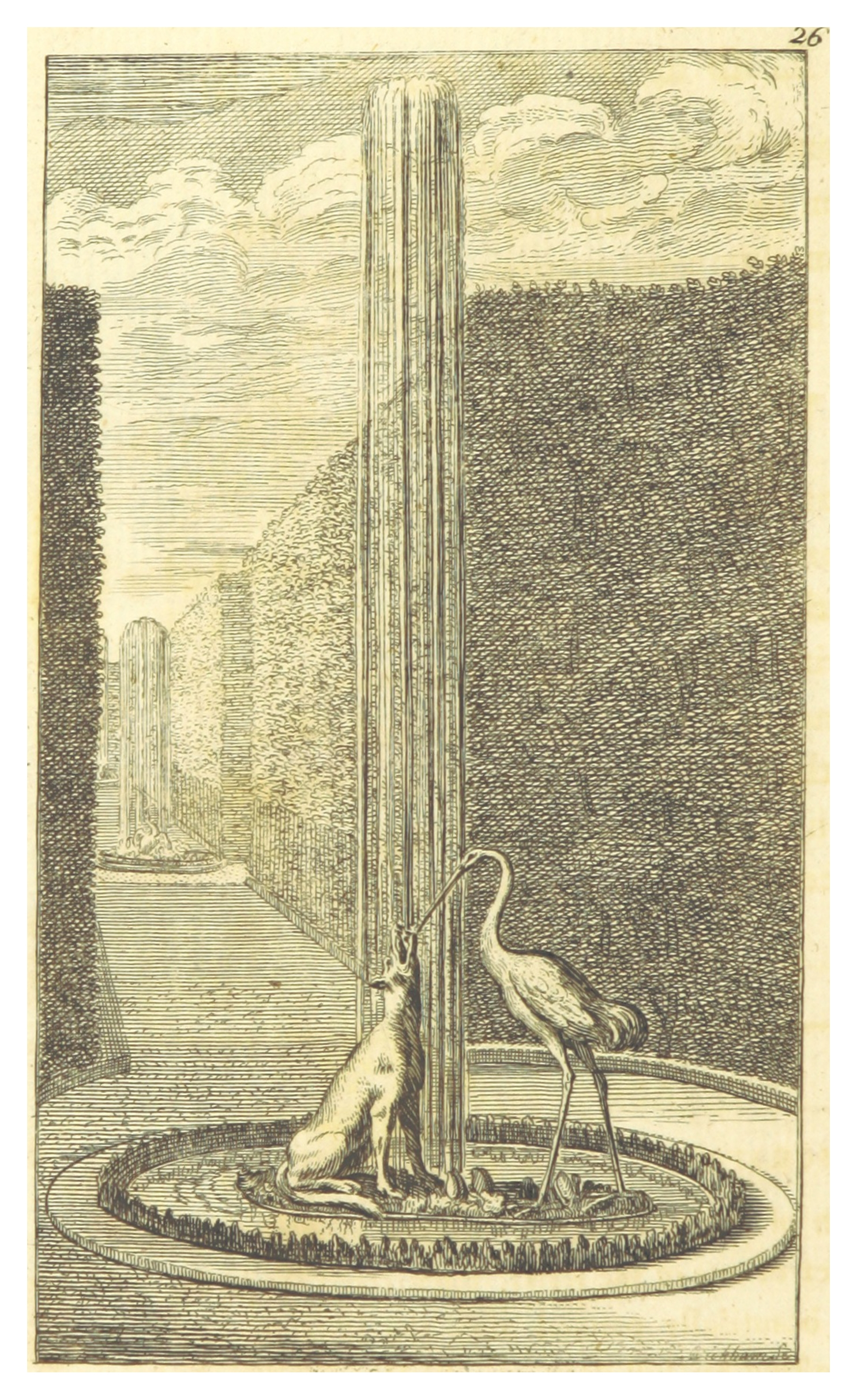
no.26: The Wolf and the Crane (Le loup et la cigogne)

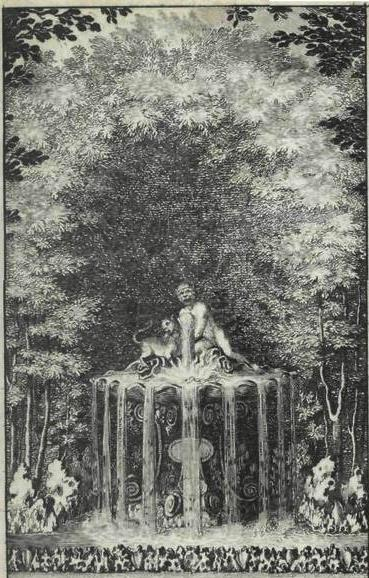
no.27: The Monkey and the Cat (Le Singe et le Chat)

== See also ==
- Louis XIV
- History of the Palace of Versailles
- Gardens of Versailles
- Aesop's Fables
- André Le Nôtre
- Charles Perrault
