= Sour Grapes =

Sour Grapes may refer to:

- Sour grapes, an expression from "The Fox and the Grapes", one of Aesop's Fables

== Film ==
- Sour Grapes (1998 film), a film by Larry David
- Sour Grapes (2016 film), a film about Rudy Kurniawan

== Literature ==
- Chew: Sour Grapes, a comic book series by John Layman and Rob Guillory
- Sour Grapes (poetry collection), a book of poems by William Carlos Williams
- Sour Grapes: Studies in the Subversion of Rationality, a 1983 book by Jon Elster

== Music ==
- "Sour Grapes", a song by Puscifer from "V" Is for Vagina
- "Sour Grapes", a song by John Prine from Diamonds in the Rough
- "Sour Grapes", a song by The Descendents from Enjoy!
- "Sour Grapes", a song by Cass Elliot from Bubblegum, Lemonade, and... Something for Mama
- "Sour Grapes", a song by Le Sserafim from the album Fearless, 2022

== Other ==
- Sour Grapes, a Strawberry Shortcake character
- "sour grapes" law, another term for sore loser law that prevents a losing primary election candidate from running in general election on another ticket

== See also ==
- Accismus
- Appeal to spite
