= Claude Lefèbvre =

French painter

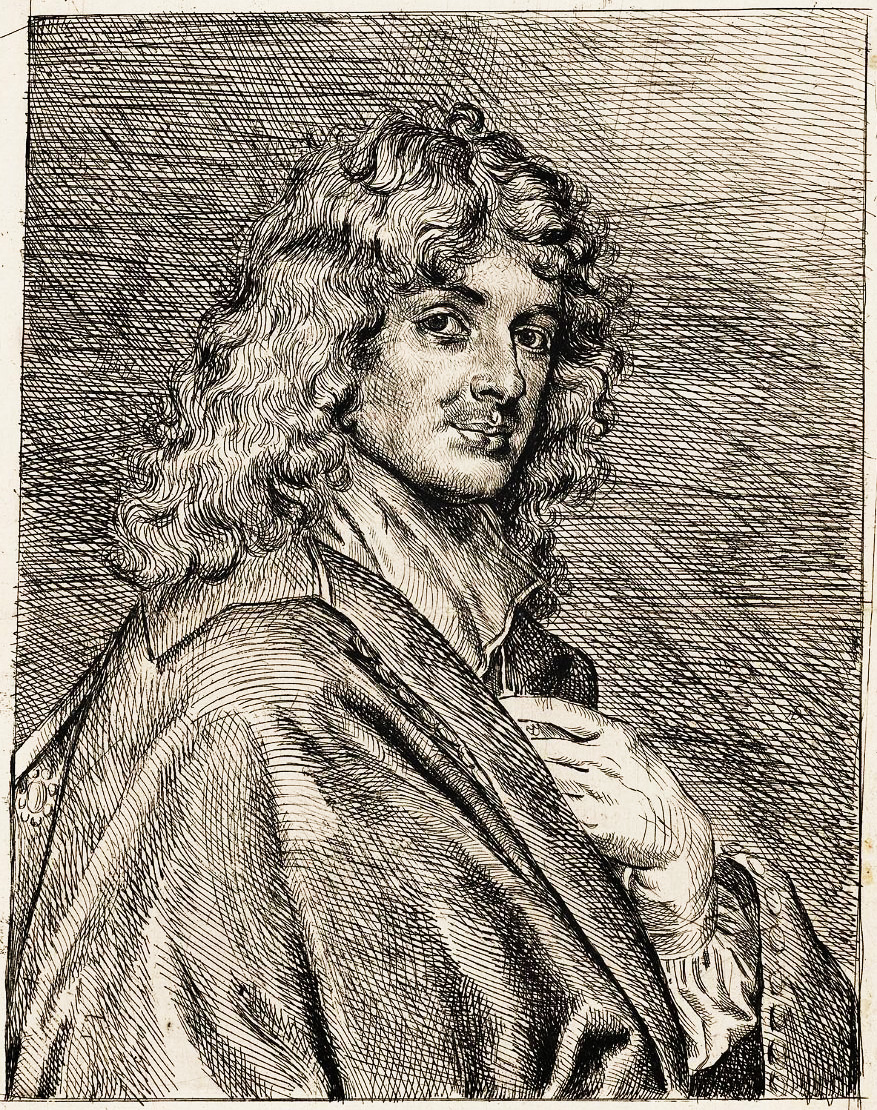
Claude Lefèbvre (self-portrait, c. 1663)

Claude Lefèbvre (12 September 1632 (baptised) - 25 April 1675) was a French painter and engraver.

== Early life and training ==
Lefèbvre was born at Fontainebleau, the son of the painter Jean Lefèbvre (1600–1675), and became a member of the workshop of Claude d'Hoey (1585–1660) at Fontainebleau. In 1654 he studied with Eustache Le Sueur in Paris, and after Le Sueur's death in 1655, with Charles Le Brun. Under Le Brun he probably assisted in the preparation of cartoons (untraced) for the tapestry series History of the King (Château of Versailles) and painted a Nativity (untraced) for Louis XIV, but Le Brun found Lefèbvre's compositions poor and encouraged him to specialize in portraiture.

== Career ==
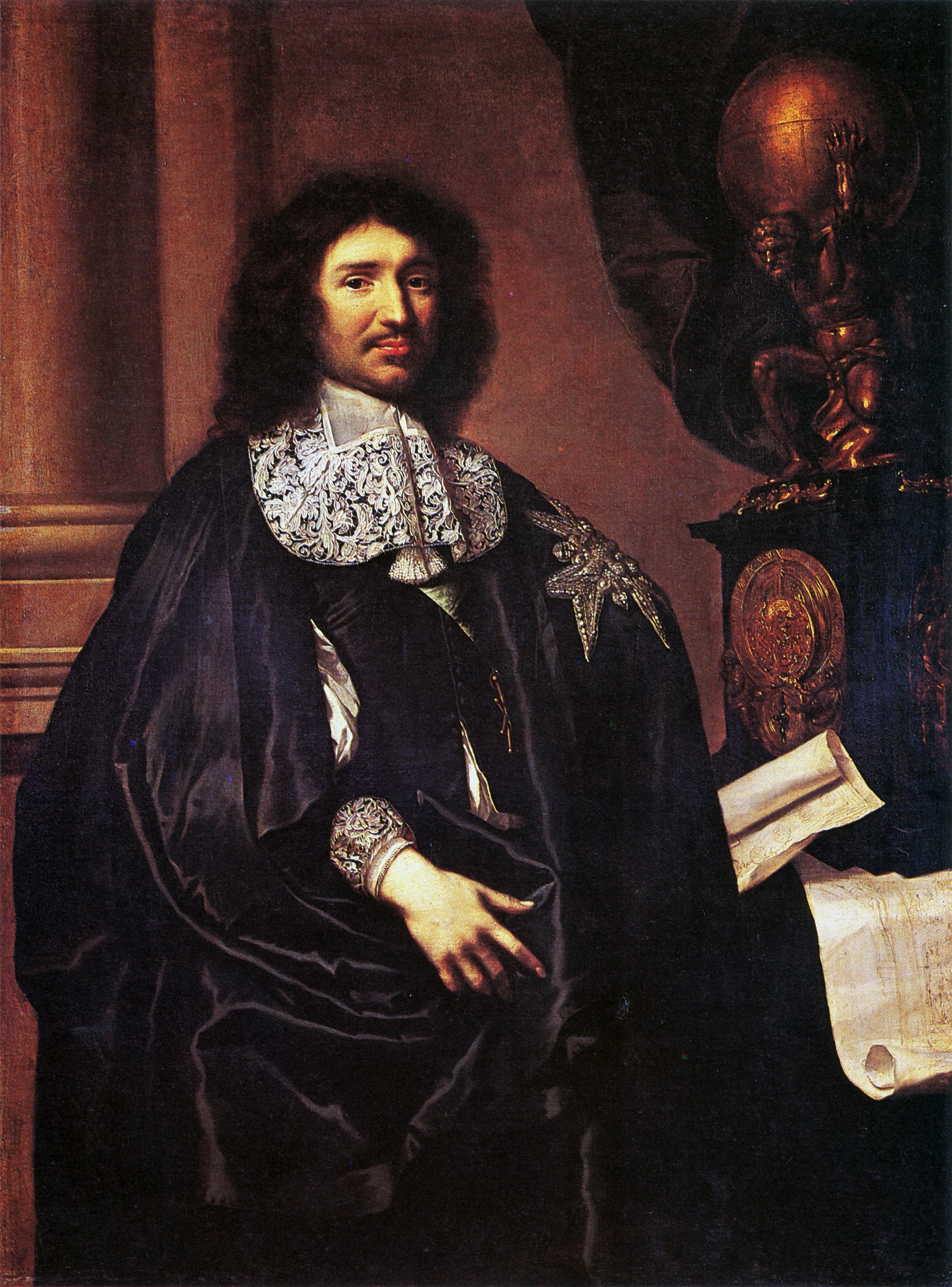
Portrait of Colbert, 1666

Lefèbvre soon established himself as a leading portrait artist, and in 1663, at the age of thirty, he was received (reçu) as a member of the Académie Royale de peinture et de sculpture in anticipation of his portrait of Jean-Baptiste Colbert (Château of Versailles). Lefèbvre spent several years creating the portrait and finally presented it on 30 October 1666. He was an assistant professor at the Académie beginning in 1664. Among his students were François de Troy and Jean Cotelle, le jeune.

Lefebvre visited England, where he appears to have been influenced by the work of Anthony van Dyck. In London he was invited to paint at the court of King Charles II of England. His work is included in major collections such as the National Portrait Gallery, London, and the Louvre.

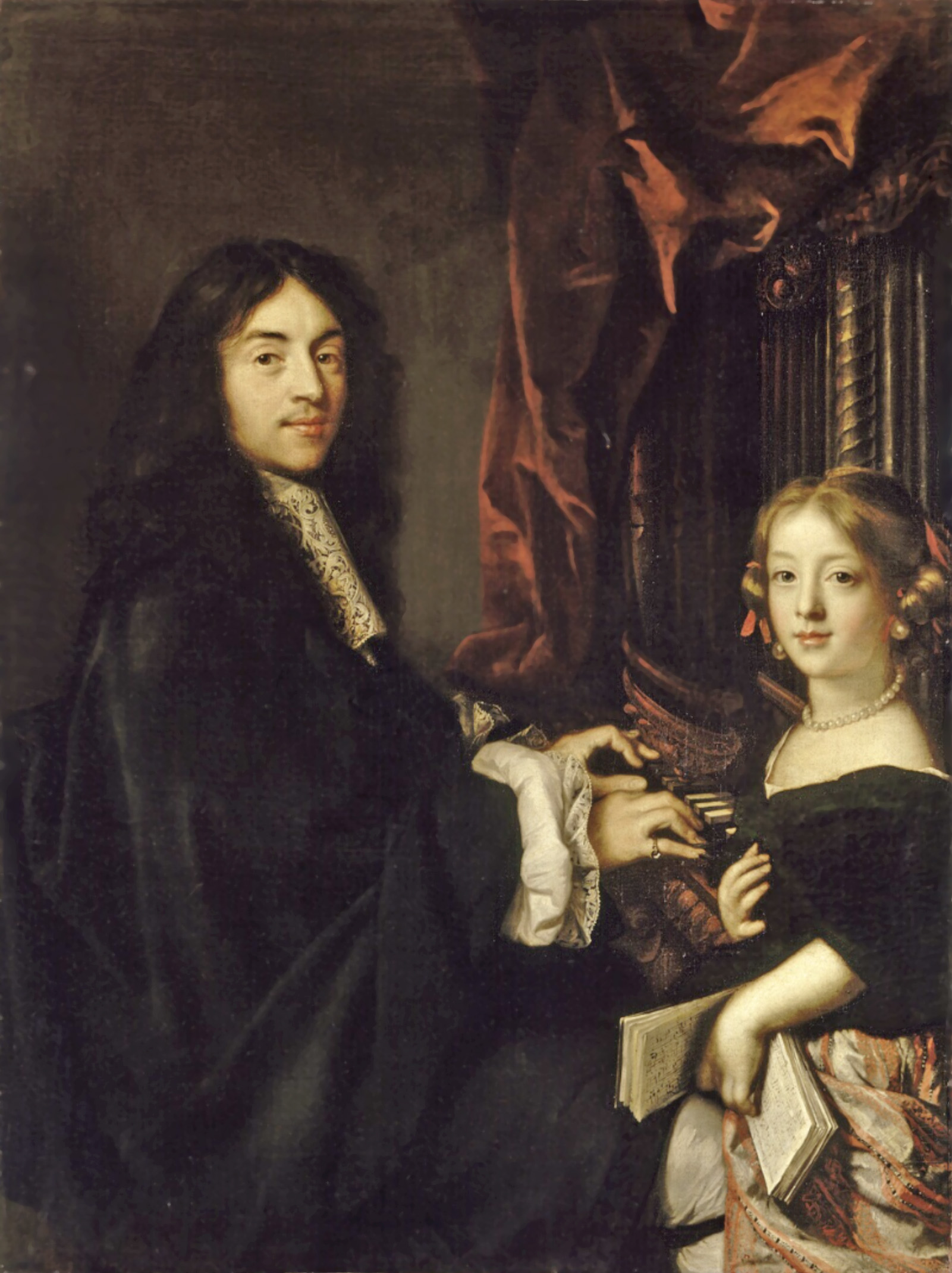
Charles Couperin and the painter's daughter, c. 1665–1670

At the peak of his career, at the Salon of 1673, he presented ten pictures, of which nine were portraits. Few of Lefèbvre's paintings have survived, and many are known only from engravings by artists such as Gérard Edelinck, Nicolas de Poilly and Pieter van Schuppen. Based on the evidence from engravings, several paintings have been attributed to Lefèbvre, including the portrait of Charles Couperin with the Artist's Daughter (Château of Versailles).

Lefèbvre was also an engraver. His engravings include a Self-portrait and a portrait of Alexandre Boudan. Claude Lefèbvre died in Paris. He is sometimes confused with Rolland Lefèbvre, a portrait painter who died in London in 1677.

== Works ==
- Charles Couperin et la fille du peintre, Musée national du château et des Trianons de Versailles
- Claude Saumaise, professeur à l’université de Leyde de 1632 à 1653, Musée national du château et des Trianons de Versailles
- Jean-Baptiste Colbert (1619-1683), Musée national du château et des Trianons de Versailles
- Louis II de Bourbon, prince de Condé et son fils aîné Henri Jules de Bourbon, duc d’Enghien, Musée national du château et des Trianons de Versailles
- Louise-Françoise de La Baume Le Blanc, duchesse de la Vallière et de Vaujours (1644-1710), Musée national du château et des Trianons de Versailles
- Portrait of Jacques de Saulx-Tavannes, Musée des Beaux-Arts de Dijon
- Portrait of Madame de Sillery, Musée des Beaux-Arts de Dole
- Portrait of a Man, Musée du Louvre
- Portrait of a Man, Musée Ingres de Montauban
- Portrait of a Magistrate, Musée des Beaux-Arts de Caen
- Portrait présumé de Claude-Emmanuel Lhuillier, dit Chapelle, Musée Condé in Chantilly, Oise
- Un Précepteur et son élève, Musée du Louvre
- Portrait de Monsieur paillet, Collection de Monsieur Christophe Bastiani.
