= Don't get above your raising =

Don't get above your raisin may be:

- Don't get above your raisin', a Southern American colloquialism
- "Don't Get Above Your Raisin'", a 1951 song by Earl Scruggs, covered by Ricky Skaggs
- Don't Get Above Your Raisin': Country Music and the Southern Working Class, a 2001 by Bill C. Malone
- "Don't Get Above Your Raisin' (1984-2003)", episode 7 of Ken Burns's documentary Country Music

== See also ==
- Pretense (disambiguation)
- Snobbery
