= Pretense =

Pretense or pretence may refer to:

- pretext
- pretexting (social engineering)
- "Pretense" (Stargate SG-1), an episode of Stargate SG-1
- "Pretense", a song by Knuckle Puck from their 2015 album Copacetic
- "Pretence", a song by Jolin Tsai from her 2006 album Dancing Diva
- a pretender's claim to the throne
- accismus

== See also ==
- Deception
- Camouflage
- False pretenses, in criminal law
