= Accismus =

Feigned refusal of something earnestly desired

Accismus is a feigned refusal of something earnestly desired.

The 1823 Encyclopædia Britannica writes that accismus may sometimes be considered as a virtue or sometimes a vice.

The Latin term comes from the Greek word is "ἀκκισμός", which, according to Britannica, was "supposed to be formed from Acco (Greek: Ἀκκώ), the name of a foolish old woman, famous in antiquity for an affectation of this kind." (An 1806 Lexicon manuale Graeco-Latinum et Latino-Graecum agrees with this derivation. However an 1820 Lexicon Graeco-Latinum associates Acco with idle occupation, e.g., chatting with other women or looking into a mirror, hence the Greek coinages ἀκκίζομαι and ἀκκισμός).

More particularly, in rhetorics, accismus is a figure of speech, a figure of refutation, and a type of irony.

== Examples ==
- (behaviour) Britannica cites Oliver Cromwell's refusal of the crown of England as an example of accismus.
- (behaviour) Merriam-Webster's Encyclopedia Of Literature cites the dismissal of the grapes by the fox in The Fox and the Grapes as an example.
- When receiving gifts or honours, accismus is used to demonstrate modesty: "I am not worthy of the honor."
- (ironic utterance) "I couldn't possibly accept such charity from you."

== See also ==
- Sour grapes (disambiguation)
