= Jean Cotelle =

French painter

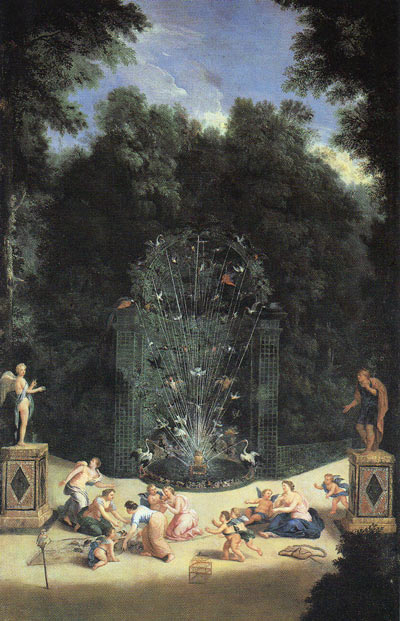
Entrance to the labyrinth at Versailles

Jean Cotelle, 'the younger' (1646–1708) was a painter and engraver, born in Paris. He received his early instruction from his father, Jean Cotelle, and eventually visited Italy. On his return he devoted himself to his profession, producing historical paintings, miniatures, and occasionally etchings. His chef-d'oeuvre was the 'Marriage at Cana,' painted in 1681 for the cathedral of Notre-Dame. There are by him at Versailles several views in the gardens of that palace. He etched a plate representing 'Our Lord on the Mount of Olives,' and a series of seven scenes from the history of Venus. He was admitted into the Academy in 1672, and died at Villers-sur-Marne in 1708.
