= The Bird in Borrowed Feathers =

Aesop's fable

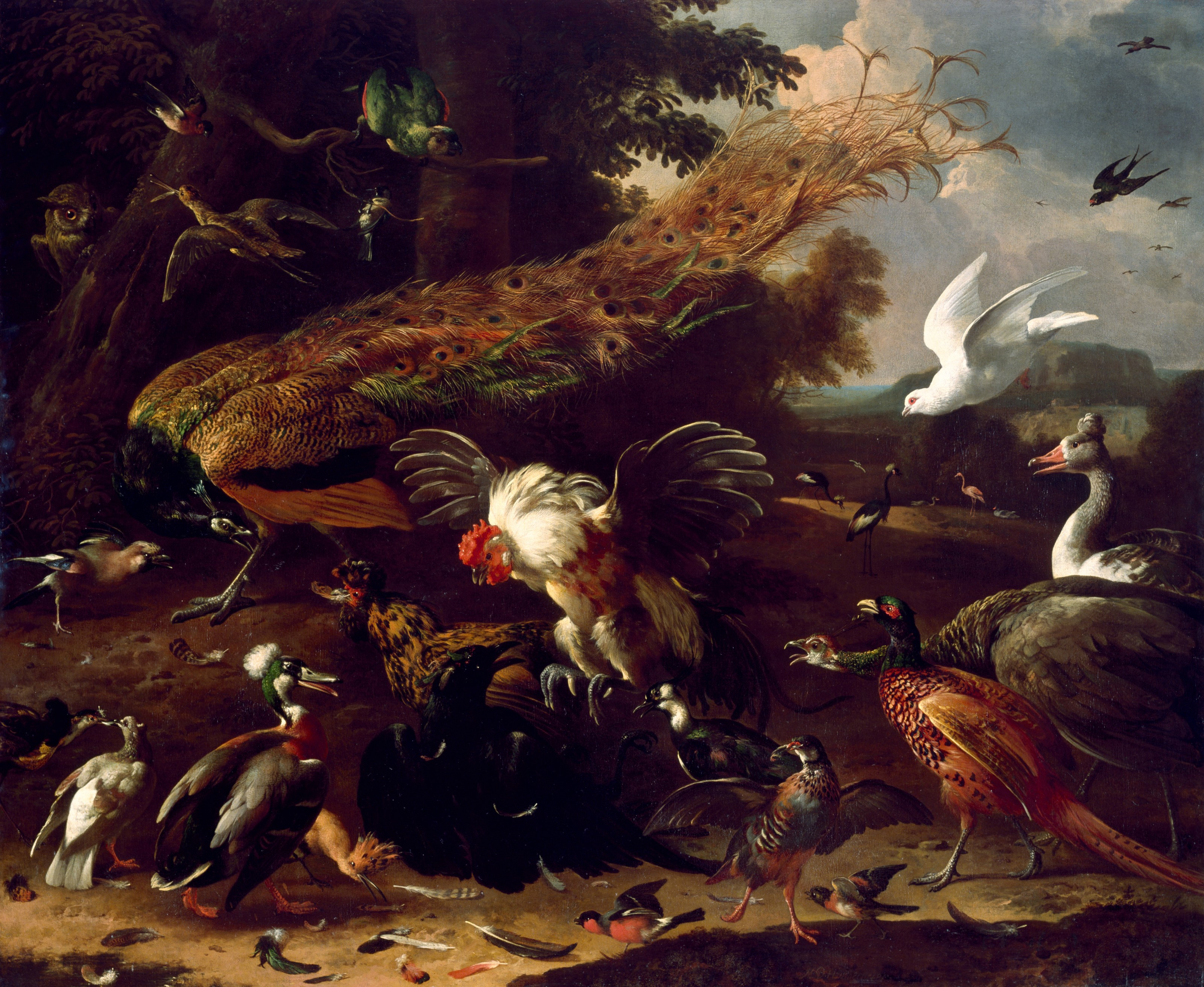
The Crow Exposed by Melchior d' Hondecoeter (ca. 1680), oil on canvas, 170.2 × 211.5 cm., Museum of Fine Arts, Houston

The Bird in Borrowed Feathers is a fable of Classical Greek origin usually ascribed to Aesop. It has existed in numerous different versions between that time and the Middle Ages, going by various titles and generally involving members of the corvid family. The lesson to be learned from it has also varied, depending on the context in which it was told. Several idioms derive from the fable.

== The main variations ==
While the details of the fable have always been varied, two main versions have been transmitted to European cultures in modern times. The first of these is mostly found in Greek sources and numbered 101 in the Perry Index. It concerns a daw or crow that dresses itself in the feathers of other birds before competing against them, only to have them recognised and stripped away by their owners; in some versions all its own feathers are also torn away. The lesson to be learned is that borrowed finery brings humiliation.

The second version stems from the Latin collection of Phaedrus and is numbered 472 in the Perry Index. In this a jackdaw (or jay in Caxton's telling) that has found some peacock feathers and stuck them among its own, looks down on its kind and joins the peacocks. When they realise the intruder is not one of themselves, they attack it, stripping away the borrowed finery and leaving the jackdaw so dishevelled that it is afterwards rejected by its fellows. The moral of the story is not to reach above one's station.

Some mediaeval versions have different details. In Odo of Cheriton's telling the crow is ashamed of its ugliness and is advised by the eagle to borrow feathers from the other birds, but when it starts to insult them the eagle suggests that the birds reclaim their feathers. Froissart's Chronicles have a certain Friar John advising church leaders that their possessions depend on temporal rulers and illustrating the lesson with a story of a bird that is born featherless until all the other birds decide to furnish it with some of their own. When it starts to act too proudly, they threaten to take their feathers back.

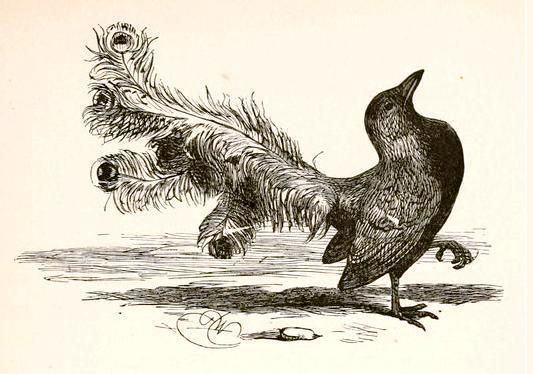
Harrison Weir's illustration of The Vain Jackdaw, 1881

Such stories addressed themselves to various kinds of pride and had given rise to the Latin idiomatic phrase esopus graculus (Aesop's jackdaw) that Erasmus recorded in his Adagia. But the story has also been used to satirise literary plagiarists in Classical times. In one of his Epistles, the Roman poet Horace alludes to the Greek version of the fable when referring to the poet Celsus, who is advised not to borrow from others 'lest, if it chance that the flock of birds should some time or other come to demand their feathers, he, like the daw stripped of his stolen colors, be exposed to ridicule.' It was in this sense too that the young William Shakespeare was attacked by the elder playwright Robert Greene as 'an upstart crow, beautified with our feathers'.

When Jean de la Fontaine adapted the story in his Fables Choisies (IV.9), it was the Latin version of a bird disguised as a peacock that he chose, but he followed Horace in applying it to 'The human jay: the shameless plagiarist'. The very free version of John Matthews, his English translator, develops the suggestion much further:

If you closely examine the men of the quill
And search for goods stolen with sharp piercing eyes,
Taking these from the pages their volumes which fill,
Huge quartos would shrink to a very small size.

However, when La Fontaine's fable was rewritten to fit a popular air in the 18th century Nouvelles Poésies Spirituelles et Morales sur les plus beaux airs, its focus was changed to dressing above one's station.

It is the Latin version too that lies behind the popular idiom 'to adorn oneself (or strut) in borrowed plumes', used against empty pretensions. This is made more obvious by the reference to peacock feathers in the Italian equivalent, Vestirsi con le penne del pavone.

Among Russian variants of the fable, Alexander Sumarokov's featured a kite in 1760, comparing it to a lowly person who has managed to enrich himself with bribes and is now holding himself as equal to nobility. Ivan Krylov's own variation was titled "The Crow" and gave rise to two expressions in Russian (after two different phrases in it): "Left the crows, but didn't join the peacocks" (От ворон отстала, а к павам не пристала) and "Neither peacock nor crow" (Ни пава, ни ворона). While keeping close to the fable at the start, Krylov ends by extending the application to the human example of a merchant's daughter marrying a noble and fitting neither with his family nor her own.

== Artistic use ==
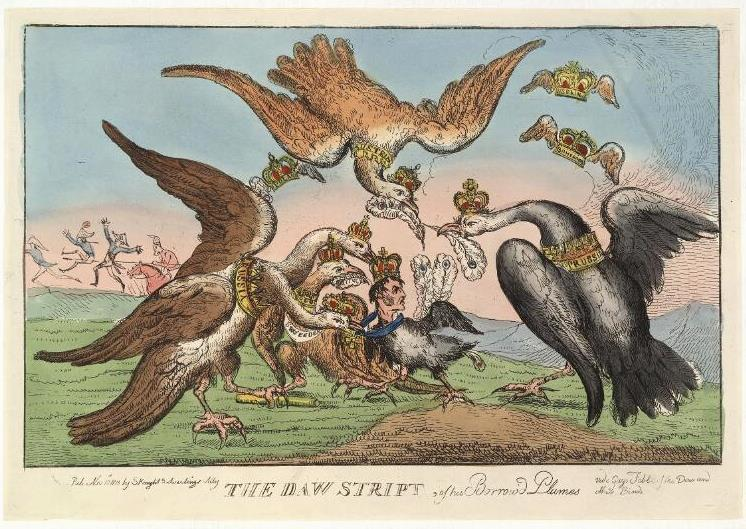
The fable applied to Napoleon in a political cartoon

In the 17th century, when paintings were popular home decorations but had to be justified by carrying a moral message, the Dutch artist Melchior d'Hondecoeter executed at least two of the Greek version of the fable in which many species of bird attack the daw. He was followed in 1719 by Pieter Casteels III, whose "Fable of the Raven" shows flocks of brightly coloured birds descending for the attack. English artists who have been influenced by their treatment of the subject include George Lance, whose "The vain jackdaw stripped of his borrowed plumes" was highly praised when he exhibited it at the British Institution in 1828. In the 20th century, Edward Bawden's composite design of the same subject incorporates a broad variety of exotic species, including parrots and flamingoes.

Many illustrations of La Fontaine's fables follow similar themes, including Kano Tomo-nobou's Japanese woodcut version published from Tokyo in 1894. Political cartoons celebrating the defeat of Napoleon also imply this imagery, with feathered kings and emperors snatching away his finery. There was a slightly earlier Japanese woodprint by Kawanabe Kyosai in his Isoho Monogotari series (1870–80) which shows peacocks attacking a prostrate crow. In general the artist was dependent on John Tenniel's illustrations of the fables for his interpretations, but in this case the print is similar to the picture in the Croxall edition of 1814.
