= The Ape and the Fox =

Ancient fables, including Aesop's

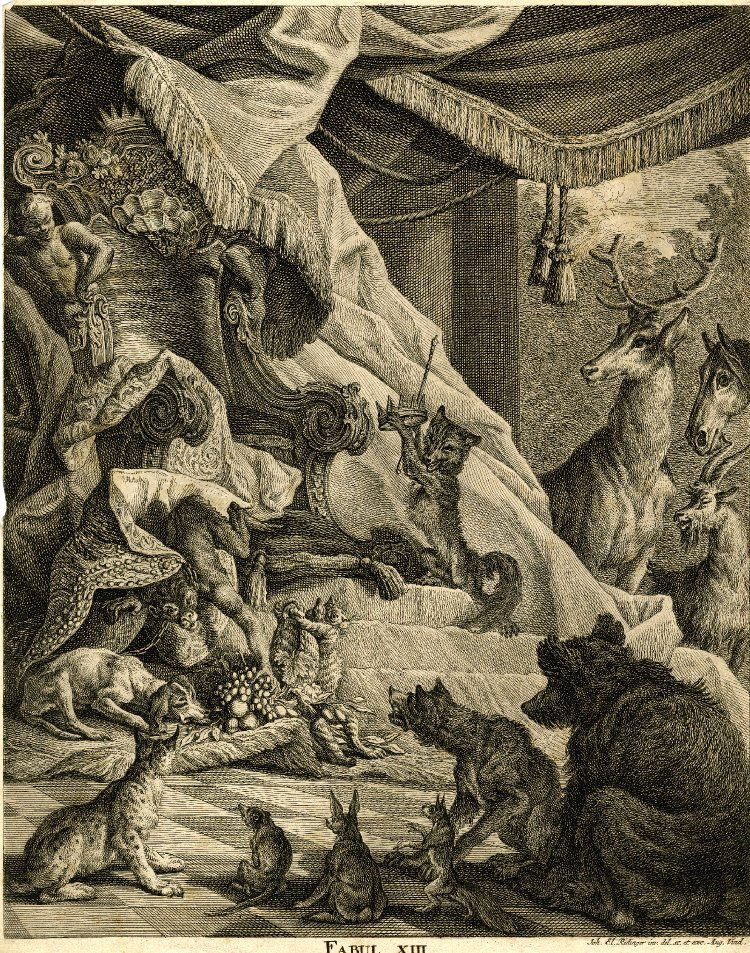
"The Monkey King", Johann Elias Ridinger's Fable XIII, 1744

The Ape and the Fox is a fable credited to Aesop and is numbered 81 in the Perry Index. However, the story goes back before Aesop's time and an alternative variant may even be of Asian origin.

== The story and its spread ==
The story relates how animals meet after the death of the lion to choose a new king and are so impressed by the capering of an ape that they crown him. The fox had been one of the contestants and now plays the part of courtier. Taking the ape aside, he says that he has found something to whet the royal appetite and leads him to a baited trap. Caught in the trap, the ape accuses the fox of treachery. The latter replies that someone so gullible and greedy is unfit to rule. Some versions provide the moral that those who aspire to rule must first learn to govern themselves.

The fable is very old and may predate Aesop, since it seems to have been used by the 7th century BCE poet Archilochos. In Europe it was for a long time restricted to Greek sources but it was one of those that also travelled eastwards into Central Asia from about the 8th century CE. Papyrus fragments of the fable from this era have been discovered in both Sogdian and Uyghur.

The fable of the ape and the fox began to appear in other European countries during the 17th century. Hieronymus Osius devoted a Neo-Latin poem to it, as did Gabriele Faerno. The latter ends with the moral that "desert must be proved by deeds" (ostendit comissus honos, quam quisque probandus). The French version of the fable by La Fontaine ends with a similar reflection as the fox chides the monkey, "Do you aspire to govern us, unable to control yourself?"

The commentary that follows the telling by Roger L'Estrange condemns all the participants: the electors for their unthinking choice, the unqualified monkey for accepting the office and the envious fox for its malice. Samuel Croxall too deplores the choice, while Thomas Bewick's edition reflects that "when Apes are in power, Foxes will never be wanting to play upon them", criticising the self-serving courtier and the foolishness that exposes authority to scorn. There was also a poem by John Byrom, subtitled "The fruits of greediness and credulity" and designed for school recitation, that was close in wording to Croxall's account.

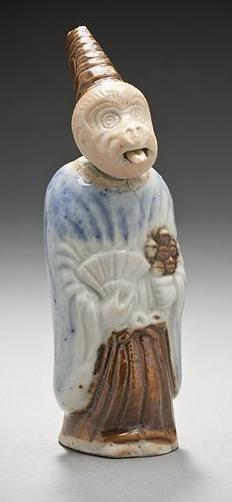
A 19th-century Japanese netsuke in the form of a dancing monkey

== The dancing monkeys ==
An alternative fable with the same implication that one's basic nature will ultimately betray itself was translated under the title "The Dancing Monkeys" by George Fyler Townsend in 1867. A prince has trained a troop of dancing monkeys to perform at court, "arrayed in their rich clothes and masks". However, a courtier disrupts their human pretence by scattering nuts on the stage, for which the monkeys immediately scramble. Formerly this had formed part of the oldest collection of Aesop's fables, the lost Aisopeia of Demetrius of Phalerum, and may have been of Oriental origin. The fable was versified by John Ogilby as "An Aegyptian King and his Apes" and told by Roger L'Estrange with the reflection that "it is not in the Power of Study and Discipline to extinguish Natural Inclinations". That moral was put more directly in the German version set by Andre Asriel as the last of his Sechs Fabeln nach Äsop (1922): "Ape is always ape, even when taught to dance" (Das Affen bleiben immer Affen, auch wenn man sie das Tanzen lehrt).

== Art ==
Illustrations of the fable begin with the fine Medici manuscript of 1480, which collects Greek versions of Aesop's fables. The illumination accompanying the story is often a composite of incidents there. In the case of "The Ape and the Fox" these portray the ape dancing before an audience of animals on the left and on the right the crowned ape caught in a snare and attended by the fox.

These key incidents are interpreted differently over the centuries. La Fontaine's fable featured a scene in which various creatures unsuccessfully try on the dead lion's crown until the ape pleases them with its capering. 19th century prints by Gustave Doré and Grandville picture this moment, in which the ape is balancing an impossibly large crown on its shoulders. In the previous century, Jean-Baptiste Oudry chose the final incident in which the ape's leg is caught in a mechanical trap, a scene varied by Thomas Bewick to show the ape caught by the arm.

A more novel approach to illustrating the fable's message was taken by Johann Elias Ridinger in his Instructive Fables from the Animal Kingdom for the Improvement of Manners and especially the Instruction of Youth (1744). There the fox has just raised the crown in a coronation ceremony before the assembled beasts, when the ape causes consternation by diving from the throne in pursuit of a platter of fruit. The print is accompanied by the explanation that "a high social position is not always matched by intelligence". Although such a sentiment matches the commentary in several fable collections, the actual scenario comes closer to that of "The Dancing Monkeys".
