= Geoffrey Whitney =

English poet (c. 1548 – c. 1601)

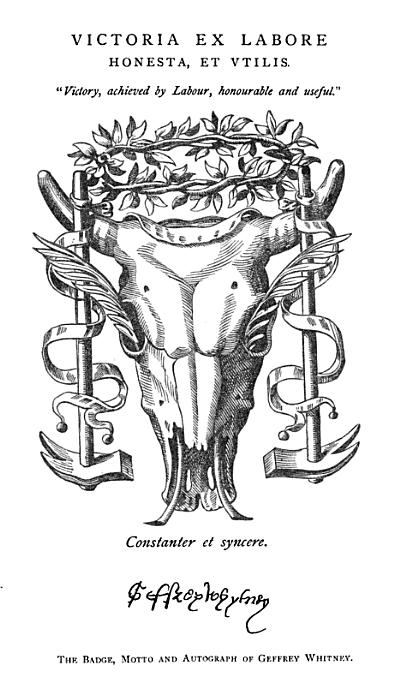
The badge, motto and autograph of Geoffrey Whitney

Geoffrey (then spelt Geffrey) Whitney (c. 1548 – c. 1601) was an English poet, now best known for the influence on Elizabethan writing of the Choice of Emblemes that he compiled.

== Life ==
Geoffrey Whitney, the eldest son of a father of the same name, was born in or about 1548 at Coole Pilate, a township in the parish of Acton, four miles from Nantwich in Cheshire, where his family had been settled on a small estate since 1388. Educated at the neighbouring school of Audlem, he afterwards proceeded to Oxford University, and then for a longer period to Magdalene College, Cambridge. He seems to have left the university without a degree, going on to legal studies in London, where he was addressed in a poem by his sister dated 1573. Having entered the legal profession, he became in time under-bailiff of Great Yarmouth, a post he held from at least 1580, retaining it until 1586. In 1584 the Earl of Leicester, high steward of the borough, made an unsuccessful attempt to procure the under-stewardship for Whitney but the place was bestowed on someone else the following year. After some litigation with the corporation, by which he seems to have been badly treated, the dispute was settled by a compensatory payment.

During his residence at Yarmouth, Whitney appears to have had much contact with the Netherlands, and to have made the acquaintance of many scholars there. On the termination of his connection with the town, he followed his patron into Holland and settled in Leyden, where 'he was in great esteem among his countrymen for his ingenuity'. On 1 March 1586 he became a student in the town's newly founded university and later in the year he brought out his Choice of Emblemes. This contains many commendatory poems that make much of his connection with the Earl. There is no evidence of how much longer he stayed abroad. He subsequently returned to England and rented a farm in the neighbourhood of his birthplace at Ryles (or Royals) Green, near Combermere Abbey. There he made his will on 11 September 1600, describing himself as 'sick in bodie but of sounde and perfect memorie'. The will was proved on 28 May 1601 and he seems to have died unmarried.

His sister Isabella Whitney was likewise a writer of verses. Her principal work, A Sweet Nosegay, or Pleasant Posye, contayning a Hundred and Ten Phylosophicall Flowers, appeared in 1573.

== Poetry ==
Whitney's reputation depends upon his celebrated emblem book, the full title of which was A Choice of Emblemes and other Devises, for the moste parte gathered out of sundrie writers, Englished and moralised, and divers newly devised, by Geffrey Whitney. A worke adorned with varietie of matter, both pleasant and profitable: wherein those that please maye finde to fit their fancies: Because herein, by the office of the eie and the eare, the minde maye reape dooble-delighte throughe holsome preceptes, shadowed with pleasant devises: both fit for the vertuous, to their incoraging; and for the wicked, for their admonishing and amendment. It was published in a two-part quarto edition from the Plantin Press in Leyden and dedicated to the Earl of Leicester from London, 28 November 1585, with an epistle to the reader dated Leyden, 4 May 1586.

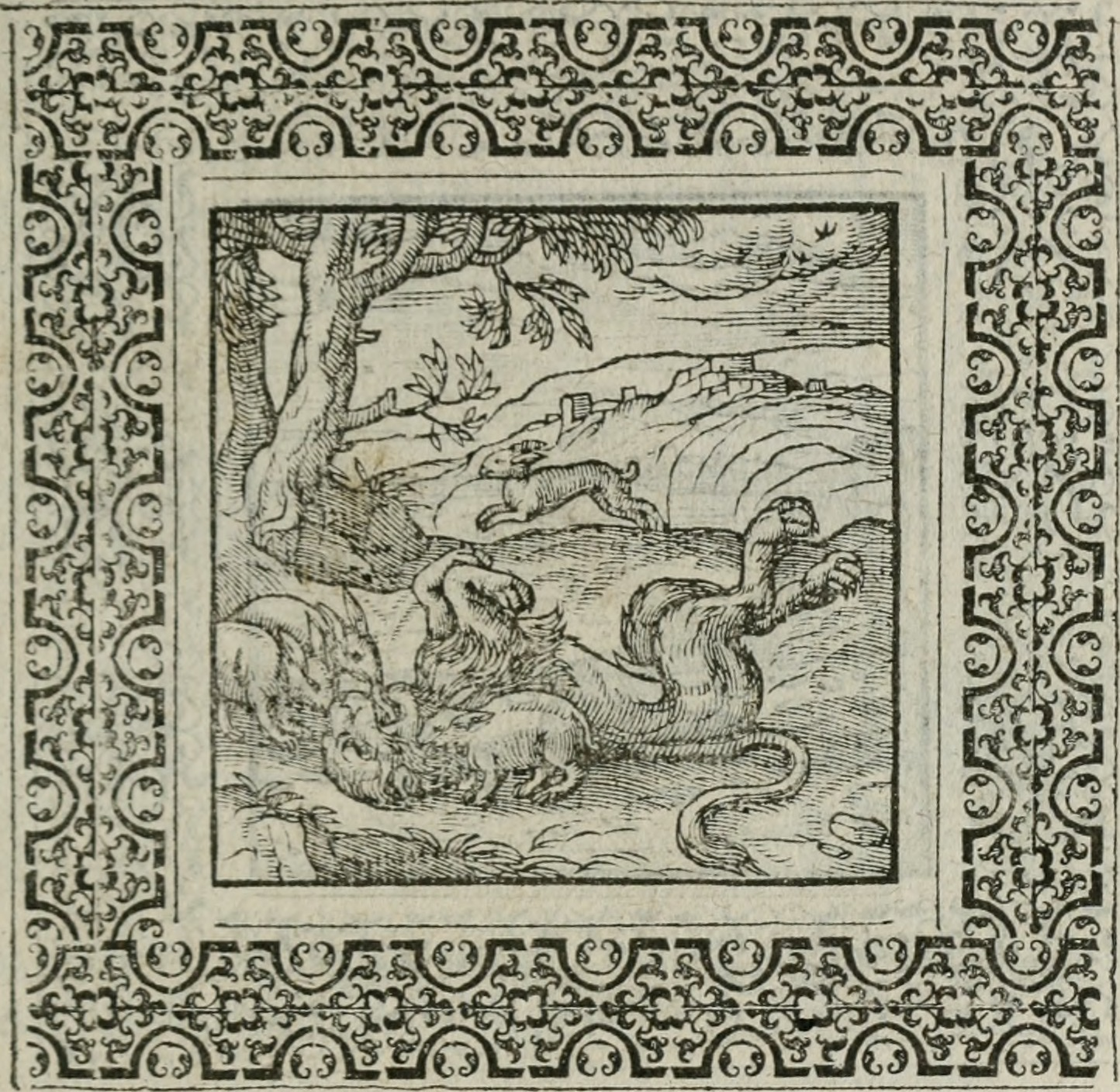
An image from A Choice of Emblemes, 1586

The work was the first of its kind to give to Englishmen an adequate example of the emblem books from the great continental presses. It was mainly from this book, representing the greater part of emblem literature preceding it, that Shakespeare gained knowledge of the great foreign emblematists of the 16th century. There are 248 emblems, each accompanied by a woodcut with a motto and a poem in English. 202 of the illustrations were chosen from the stock held at the Plantin Press and are the work of Andrea Alciato, Claude Paradin, Johannes Sambucus, Hadrianus Junius, and the illustrator of Gabriele Faerno's Centum Fabulae. Twenty-three more are suggested by the work of others and a further 23 are original.

The poems are for the most part in six-line stanzas; a few are in quatrains or are even two-line epigrams. They are addressed to Whitney's kinsmen or friends, or to a notable contemporary, and give information of persons, places, and things rarely to be found elsewhere. The verses are often of great merit and always show extensive learning. Some are translations or adaptations of Classical authors such as Horace (p. 59), Ovid (p. 121) and Anacreon (p. 182). It is noteworthy that there are a higher proportion of fables in the collection than are usual in other emblem books. While most are the fables of Aesop to be found in Faerno's Centum Fabulae, which had been issued from the Plantin Press in 1567, there are rarer items like The Dog in the Manger and Washing the Ethiopian white.

Anthony Wood's Athenae Oxonienses credits Whitney with another collection of Fables or Epigrams 'printed much about the same time', but no evidence of it has been found. The title sounds more like a description of the contents of Choice of Emblemes. Two other poems were printed in his friend Jan Dousa's Odae Brittanicae, also printed by the Plantin Press in 1586. One is a translation of complimentary verses addressed to the Earl of Leicester; the other is a 90-line commendation of the book of odes, very much in the style of his own emblem book:

There needes no bushe, wheare nectar is to drinke;
Nor helpes by arte, wheare bewtie freshe doth bloome;
Wheare sonne doth shine, in vayne wee lyghte the linke;
Wheare sea dothe swelle, the brookes do loose their roome;

Let Progne cease, wheare Philomela singes,
And oaten pipe, wheare Fame her trompet ringes.

More recently it has been argued that the two commendatory sonnets that preface Edmund Spenser's Amoretti (1595) were written by Whitney and his father.

== Notes ==
- Details are taken from the Dictionary of National Biography (London and New York, 1900), vol. LXI, pages 142–143.
