= János Zsámboky =

Hungarian scholar

Johannes Sambucus
- János Zsámboky
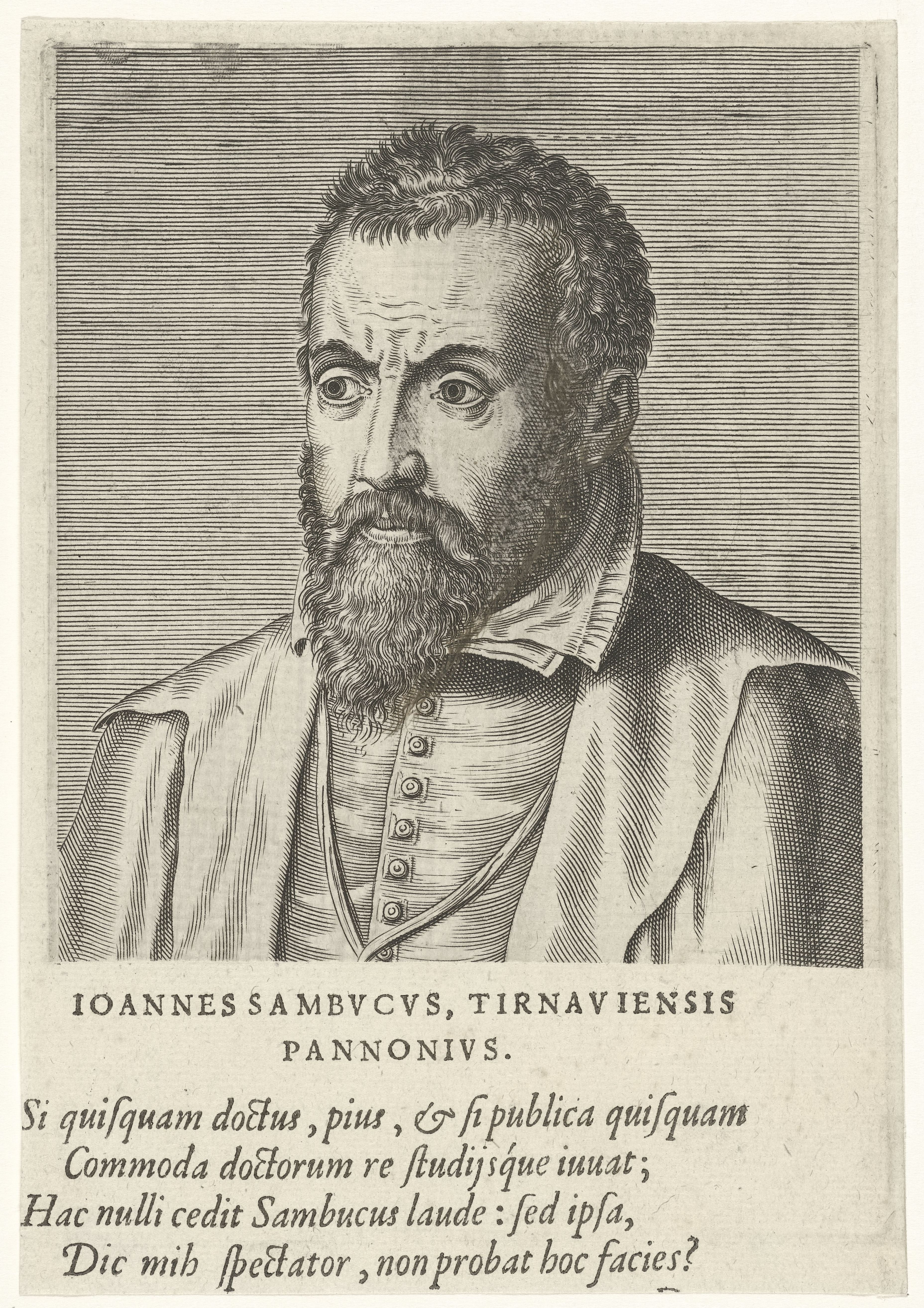
- Born: 1 June 1531; Nagyszombat
- Died: 13 June 1584 (aged 53); Vienna

János Zsámboky or János Zsámboki or János Sámboki, (with his humanist name Latin: Johannes Sambucus, or Johannes Pannonicus Sambucus; 1 June 1531 – 13 June 1584) was a Hungarian humanist scholar, physician, philologist, and historian.

Sambucus was born in Trnava (Latin: Tyrnavia, Hungarian: Nagyszombat). He was the composer of the most renowned emblem book in Hungary: Emblemata cum aliquot nummis antiqui operis (1564). Sambucus' emblem book was edited five times and it was translated into French and Dutch. He also wrote the Icones veterum aliquot ac recentium Medicorum Philosophorumque in 1574, published in Antwerp. He died, aged 53, in Vienna.

== Life and work ==
Johannes Sambucus was born in the year 1531 in the town Trnava. While he was Hungarian politically (as a person born in the kingdom), it is possible his family also had Slovak roots.

In Vienna in 1542 he graduated, and went on to study philology, ancient languages, law, history, and philosophy in Leipzig, Wittenberg, Ingolstadt, Strasbourg, and Paris where he obtained a master's degree in philosophy in 1551. From 1558 to 1564 he traveled to Venice, Padua, Genoa, Naples, Milan, Ghent, and Antwerp . At the University of Padua, he turned to the study of medicine, becoming the Medical Licentiate in 1555. In 1560 he returned to Vienna, settling down as a physician and leading exponent of scientific and cultural knowledge.

1564 saw the first edition of his "Emblemata"; within a short time followed by five more. These works won him international renown as a master of this form of literature. He was the first Hungarian writer whose works were translated into French.

1581 saw the publication of the first edition of Sambucus' Corpus Iuris Hungarici. The principles contained therein, based on legal strictures of antiquity, contributed to the foundations of the modern day Hungarian legal system.

Sambucus was appointed the court physician of Emperor Maximilian II, as well as the Imperial Council and Hofhistoriograf. From this he obtained a considerable fortune, with which he amassed the largest private library in the world. The library contained numerous previously unknown ancient and contemporary Greek and Latin manuscripts, for instance: Janus Pannonius and Antonio Bonfini, whose texts he partially edited or through his influence supplied patronage to. He also published several maps and geographical descriptions, e.g. "Hungaria", "Transilvaniae Descriptio" and "Illirium", and sometimes wrote Latin poems. Along with his library, he had a large coin and art collection.

Sambucus influenced numerous personalities of the humanistic spirit of his time, many by letter correspondence. He died on June 13, 1584, in Vienna. A plaque commemorates his life at his residence, Singer street in the 1st, House No. 3.

Sambucus' collection of books, maps, coins, and art formed the basis for the manuscript collection of the Austrian National Library.

== Bibliography ==
- Sarah Bakewell : A bibliography of Joannes Sambucus (1531–1584) Dept.. of Library, Archive and Information Studies, September 1994.
- Hans Gerstinger (ed.): From the diary of the imperial court historian Johannes Sambucus (1531–1584): Cod Vind Latin 9039, fol (Proceedings of the Austrian Academy of Sciences of Humanities Class, Volume 248, 2 Dep.). Böhlau, Vienna 1965.
- Hans Gerstinger. Letters of John Sambucus (Zsamboky) 1554-1584 (Proceedings of the Austrian Academy of Sciences of Humanities Class, Volume 255.). Böhlau, among other things, Graz 1968.
- Hans Gerstinger: Johannes Sambucus as handwriting Collectors In:.. Studies in the National Library in Vienna, Vienna 1926, pp. 250–399
- Pál Gulyás, István Monok (ed.), András Varga (Zusammenst.): The library Sambucus. Catalog after the copy of Pál Gulyás Scriptum KFT, Szeged 1992, ISBN 963-481-917-6 .
- Wolfgang Harms: Sambucus, Johannes. In: New German Biography (NDB). Volume 22, Duncker & Humblot, Berlin 2005, ISBN 3-428-11203-2, pp. 405 f ( digitized ).
- Maria Radnoti-Alfoldi : One of the early illustrations numismatic works: the "Emblemata" of Johannes Sambucus, 1531-1584 Reprint from:. *Rainer Albert u Cunz Reiner (eds.): Science History of Numismatics: Contributions to the 17th German Numismatikertag 3–5 March 1995 Hanover Numismatic Society, Speyer 1995, pp. 71–95..
- Johannes Sambucus: Emblemata et aliquot nummi operis antiqui. 2nd ed cum emendatione et auctario copioso ipsius auctoris. Reprint edition of Antwerp, 1566. Olms, Hildesheim, Zurich, New York 2002, ISBN 3-487-11380-5 .
- E. Schultheisz: A Hungarian medical humanist Johannes Zsamboky (Sambucus) and its relationships with some of his German friends. In: XXX. Congrès International d'Histoire de la Médicine, 1986. Actes, Düsseldorf 1988, pp. 441–444.
- Arnoud SQ Visser: humanism the use of the emblem in late-Renaissance dissertation: Joannes Sambucus and the learned image.. University of Leiden, 2003. Brill, Leiden, Boston 2005, ISBN 90-04-13866-8 ( digitized )
- Werner Waterschoot: Lucas d'Heere and J. Sambucus In:.. Emblematica 5, 1990.
- German Biographical Encyclopedia . paperback edition, Vol. 8 S. 508
- Almási, Gábor (2009). The uses of humanism : Johannes Sambucus (1531-1584), Andreas Dudith (1533-1589), and the republic of letters in East Central Europe. Leiden: Brill. ISBN 978-90-04-18364-3. OCLC 704654114.
