= Isaac de Benserade =

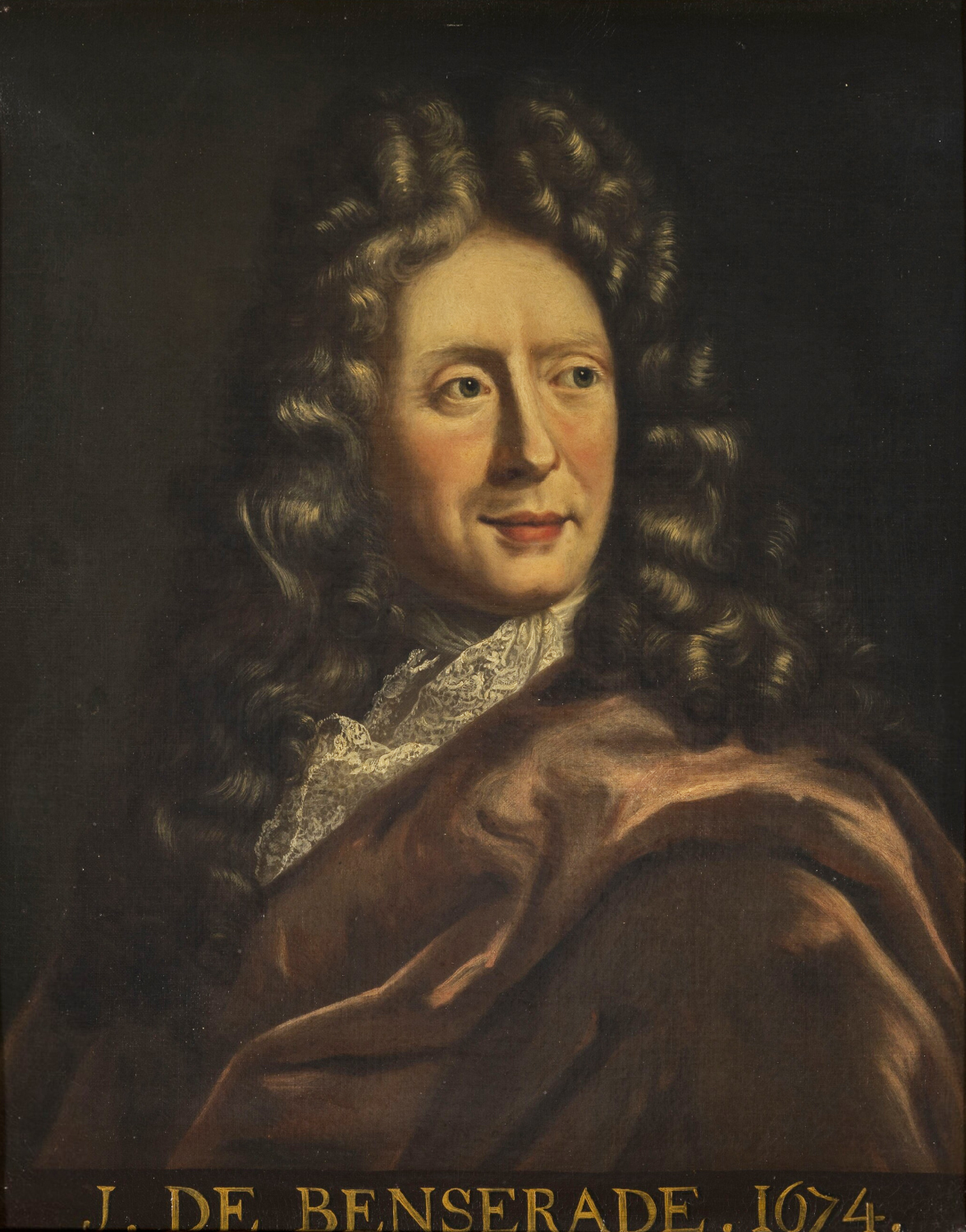
- Born: 5 November 1613; Lyons-la-Forêt, Province of Normandy, Kingdom of France
- Died: 10 October 1691 (aged 77)
- Writing career
- Language: French
- Notable awards: Académie française
- Literary movement: Précieuses

Isaac de Benserade (French: [bɛ̃.sʁad]; baptized 5 November 1613 – 10 October 1691) was a French poet and playwright.

Born in Lyons-la-Forêt, Normandy, his family appears to have been connected with Richelieu, who bestowed on him a pension of 600 livres. On Richelieu's death, Benserade lost his pension but became more and more a favourite at court, especially with Anne of Austria.

He wrote his first tragedy at the age of 23 in 1636, Cleopatra, for the actress Mademoiselle Bellerose. His first comedy was Iphis and Iante, which first opened in the Hôtel de Bourgogne in 1634. This play touches on female homosexuality in the form of cross-dressing, which was a commonplace in French literature in the 17th century.

Benserade provided the words for the court ballets and was in 1674 admitted to the French Academy, where he wielded considerable influence. In 1675, he provided the quatrains to accompany the 39 hydraulic sculpture groups depicting Aesop's fables in the labyrinth of Versailles. In 1676, the failure of his Métamorphoses d'Ovide in the form of rondeaux gave a blow to his reputation but by no means destroyed his vogue with his contemporaries. Benserade may be best known for his sonnet on Job (1651). The sonnet, which he sent to a young lady with his paraphrase on Job, was placed in competition with the Urania of Voiture and led to a dispute on their relative merits that long divided the whole court and the wits into two parties, styled respectively the Jobelins and the Uranists. The partisans of Benserade were headed by the prince de Conti and Mlle de Scudéry, and Mme de Montausier and Jean-Louis Guez de Balzac took the side of Voiture.

Some years before his death, Benserade retired to Gentilly and devoted himself to a translation of the Psalms, which he nearly completed.

== Works ==
- 1636 Cléopâtre
- 1637 La Mort d’Achille et la Dispute de ses armes
- 1637 Gustaphe ou l’Heureuse Ambition
- 1637 Iphis et Iante
- 1640 Méléagre
- 1648 Le Sonnet de Job
- 1651 Ballet de Cassandre
- 1651 Ballet des Fêtes de Bacchus
- 1653 Ballet de la Nuit
- 1654 Ballet des Proverbes
- 1654 Ballet des Noces de Pélée et de Thétis
- 1654 Ballet du Temps
- 1655 Ballet des Plaisirs
- 1655 Grand Ballet des Bienvenus
- 1656 Ballet de Psyché
- 1657 Ballet de l’Amour malade
- 1658 Ballet royal d’Alcidiane
- 1659 Ballet de la Raillerie
- 1661 Ballet royal de l’Impatience
- 1661 Ballet des Saisons
- 1663 Ballet des Arts
- 1664 Ballet des Amours déguisés
- 1664 Les Plaisirs de l'île enchantée
- 1665 Ballet royal de la Naissance de Vénus
- 1666 Ballet des Muses
- 1669 Ballet royal de Flore
- 1676 Métamorphoses d’Ovide en rondeaux
- 1678 Fables d'Ésope en quatrains
- 1681 Ballet du Triomphe de l’Amour
- 1682 Labyrinte de Versailles
- Stances
