= Fox & Goose (disambiguation) =

Fox & Goose is a shopping district in Ward End, Birmingham, England.

Fox & Goose or Fox and Goose may also refer to:

- Fox & Goose Public House, a British pub, restaurant, and music venue in Sacramento, California, U.S.
- The Fox and Goose, a pub in Hebden Bridge, West Yorkshire, England, after which the California venue is named
- Fox and Goose Ground, a former cricket ground in Coalville, Leicestershire, England

== See also ==
- The Fox and the Cat
- Fox and Crane
- The Fox and the Crow (disambiguation)
- The Fox and the Grapes
- The Fox and the Hound
- The Fox and the Lion
- The Fox and the Stork
