= The Fox and the Crow =

The Fox and the Crow (or The Crow and the Fox) may refer to:

- The Fox and the Crow (Aesop), one of Aesop's Fables
- The Fox and the Crow (animated characters), a pair of anthropomorphic cartoon characters and series created in 1941
- The Crow and the Fox (Krylov's fable), a fable by Ivan Krylov, based on Aesop's version
