= List of Krylov's fables =

This is a list of the Fables of Ivan Krylov.

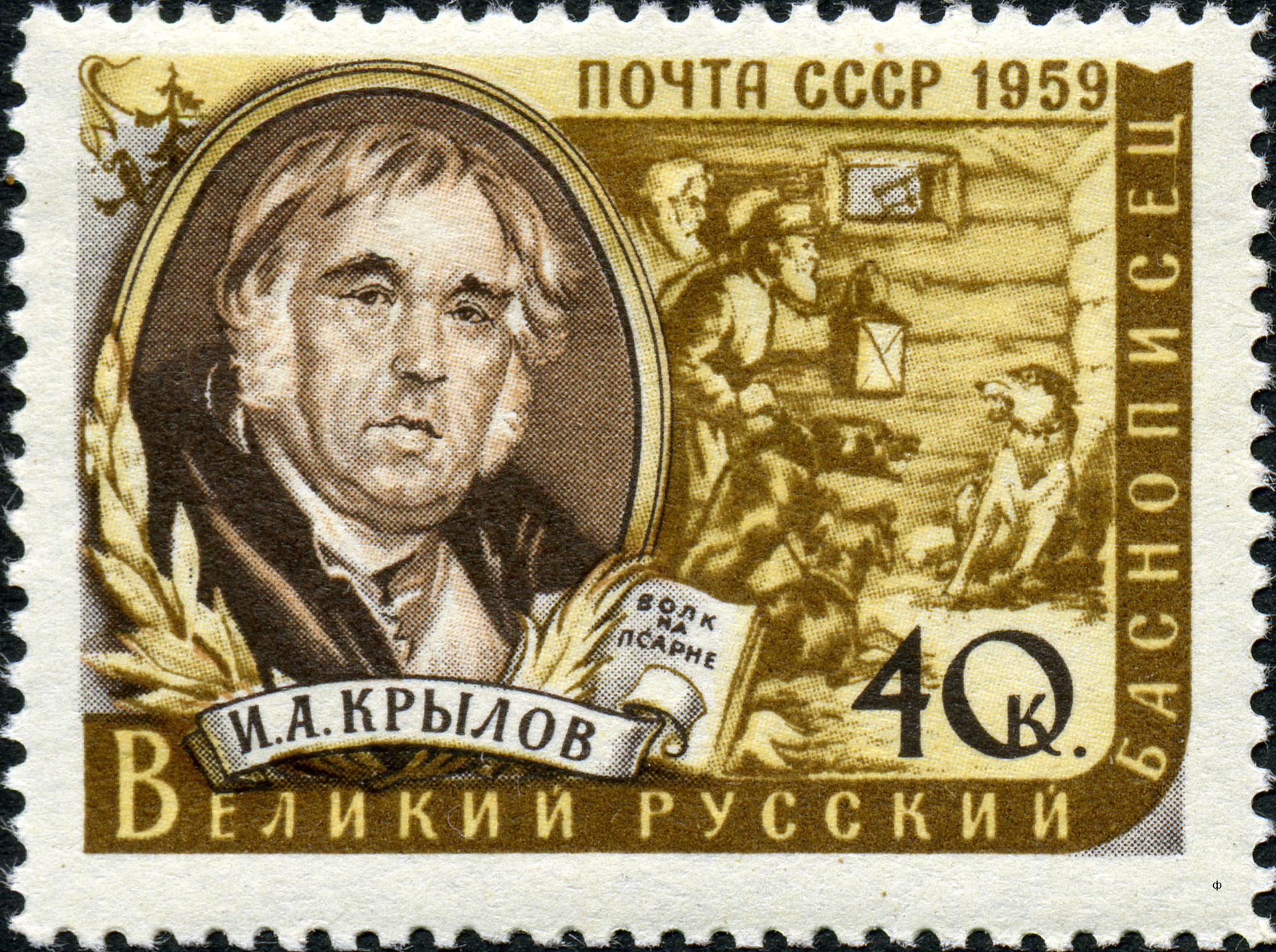
Portrait of I. A. Krylov (after Karl Bryullov) with his fable The Wolf in the Kennel (Волк на псарне / Volk na psarne; II.8), illustrations on a Soviet stamp (1959) by Vasili Zavyalov. - The fable represents one of Krylov’s most important responses to Russia’s Patriotic War against Napoleon’s aggression. In the characters of the Huntsman and the Wolf, M. I. Kutuzov and Napoleon are depicted.

The Fables (Russian: Басни / Basni) are a collection of some 200 fables by the Russian poet Ivan Krylov (1769–1844), considered classics of Russian literature. They have been translated into many languages and they appeal to today's readers just as much as to those of the past.

Nine Books I - II - III - IV - V - VI - VII - VIII - IX & Additional Fables

== Introduction ==
Ivan Krylov began by translating La Fontaine’s Fables in 1805 but soon started writing his own. Krylov published the first collection of 23 fables in 1809, 15 stories were inspired of works by Aesop and La Fontaine, Krylov gave them a distinct Russian character. This first collection brought him immediate fame. Over time, these fables "quickly became part of the texture of everyday Russian life" (Cornwell), and Krylov attained the status of a national writer of Russia during his lifetime. The number of fables continued to grow, and the final, most comprehensive edition comprised around 200 fables, organized into 9 “books” or chapters. Besides there are some additional fables not published during his lifetime.

Most fables feature animals, such as The Frog and the Ox (Лягушка и Вол / Lyagushka i Vol) and The Crow and the Fox (Ворона и Лисица / Vorona i Lisitsa), whose behavior reflects human traits. Others focus on human figures, like The Peasant and Death (Крестьянин и Смерть / Krestyanin i Smert). They are known for clear scenes, vivid characters, humorous exaggeration, and moral lessons.

Some fables refer to historical events, such as Napoleon’s invasion of Russia in 1812, but most are universal and timeless. Certain works were delayed by censorship, including The Feast (Пир / Pir). By Krylov’s death in 1844, 77,000 copies had been sold. His fables continue to influence Russian culture, reflecting enduring human and social themes.

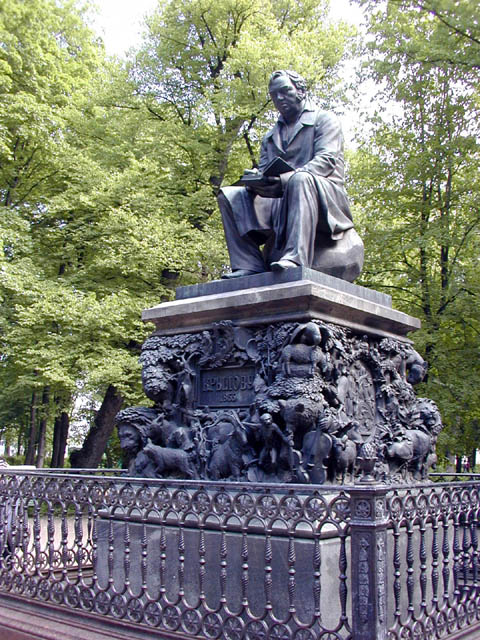
The seated statue of the fabulist Ivan Krylov in the Summer Garden in Saint Petersburg with pedestal showing the animal characters of his fables. Sculptor Baron Peter Clodt von Jürgensburg

== List ==
All titles (and the numbering) are given according to the Russian titles in the order of the edition of the Fables (Basni) in the Russian series Literary Monuments (Литературные памятники / Literaturnye pamyatniki), Moscow/Leningrad 1956 (Academy of Sciences of the USSR), with added English translations of the titles (without following a special English edition):

=== Fables in Nine Books ===
Book One

- Vorona i Lisica (Ворона и Лисица) – The Crow and the Fox (I.1)
- Dub i Trost (Дуб и Трость) – The Oak and the Reed (I.2)
- Muzykanty (Музыканты) – The Musicians (I.3)
- Vorona i Kurica (Ворона и Курица) – The Crow and the Hen (I.4)
- Larchik (Ларчик) – The Casket (I.5)
- Ljagushka i Vol (Лягушка и Вол) – The Frog and the Ox (I.6)
- Razborchivaja Nevesta (Разборчивая Невеста) – The Fastidious Bride (I.7)
- Parnas (Парнас) – Parnassus (I.8)
- Orakul (Оракул) – The Oracle (I.9)
- Vasilek (Василек) – The Cornflower (I.10)
- Rosha i Ogon (Роща и Огонь) – The Grove and the Fire (I.11)
- Chizh i Ezh (Чиж и Еж) – The Siskin and the Hedgehog (I.12)
- Volk i Jagnjonok (Волк и Ягнёнок) – The Wolf and the Lamb (I.13)
- Obez'jany (Обезьяны) – The Monkeys (I.14)
- Sinica (Синица) – The Titmouse (I.15)
- Osjol (Осёл) – The Donkey (I.16)
- Martyshka i Ochki (Мартышка и Очки) – The Monkey and the Glasses (I.17)
- Dva Golubja (Два Голубя) – Two Doves (I.18)
- Chervonec (Червонец) – The Gold Coin (I.19)
- Troezhenec (Троеженец) – The Man with Three Wives (I.20)
- Bezbozhniki (Безбожники) – The Godless (I.21)
- Orel i Kury (Орел и Куры) – The Eagle and the Hens (I.22)

Book Two

- Lyagushki, prosyashchie Tsarya (Лягушки, просящие Царя) – The Frogs Seeking a Ruler (II.1)
- Lev i Bars (Лев и Барс) – The Lion and the Leopard (II.2)
- Vel'mozha i Filosof (Вельможа и Философ) – The Nobleman and the Philosopher (II.3)
- Mor Zverej (Мор Зверей) – Pestilence Among Animals (II.4)
- Sobach'ja druzhba (Собачья дружба) – Dog’s Friendship (II.5)
- Razdel (Раздел) – Division (II.6)
- Bochka (Бочка) – The Barrel (II.7)
- Volk na psarne (Волк на псарне) – The Wolf in the Kennel (II.8)
- Ruchej (Ручей) – The Brook (II.9)
- Lisica i Osjol (Лисица и Осёл) – The Fox and the Donkey (II.10)
- Prohozhie i Sobaki (Прохожие и Собаки) – Passersby and the Dogs (II.11)
- Strekoza i Muravej (Стрекоза и Муравей) – The Grasshopper and the Ant (II.12)
- Lzhec (Лжец) – The Liar (II.13)
- Orjol i Pchela (Орёл и Пчела) – The Eagle and the Bee (II.14)
- Zajac na lovle (Заяц на ловле) – The Hare on the Hunt (II.15)
- Shhuka i Kot (Щука и Кот) – The Pike and the Cat (II.16)
- Volk i Kukushka (Волк и Кукушка) – The Wolf and the Cuckoo (II.17)
- Petuh i Zhemchuzhnoe Vervo (Петух и Жемчужное Верво) – The Rooster and the Pearl Necklace (II.18)
- Krest'janin i Rabotnik (Крестьянин и Работник) – The Peasant and the Worker (II.19)
- Oboz (Обоз) – The Cart (II.20)
- Voronenok (Вороненок) – The Young Raven (II.21)
- Slon na voevodstve (Слон на воеводстве) – The Elephant in Command (II.22)
- Osel i Solovej (Осёл и Соловей) – The Donkey and the Nightingale (II.23)

Book Three

- Otkupshhik i Sapozhnik (Откупщик и Сапожник) – The Tax Collector and the Shoemaker (III.1)
- Krest'janin v bede (Крестьянин в беде) – The Peasant in Trouble (III.2)
- Hozjain i Myshi (Хозяин и Мыши) – The Master and the Mice (III.3)
- Slon i Mos'ka (Слон и Моська) – The Elephant and the Pug-Dog (III.4)
- Volk i Volchenok (Волк и Волчонок) – The Wolf and the Cub (III.5)
- Obez'jana (Обезьяна) – The Monkey (III.6)
- Meshok (Мешок) – The Sack (III.7)
- Kot i Povar (Кот и Повар) – The Cat and the Cook (III.8)
- Lev i Komar (Лев и Комар) – The Lion and the Mosquito (III.9)
- Ogorodnik i Filosof (Огородник и Философ) – The Gardener and the Philosopher (III.10)
- Krest'janin i Lisica (Крестьянин и Лисица) – The Peasant and the Fox (III.11)
- Vospitanie L'va (Воспитание Льва) – The Education of the Lion (III.12)
- Starik i troe Molodyh (Старик и трое Молодых) – The Old Man and the Three Youths (III.13)
- Derevo (Дерево) – The Tree (III.14)
- Gusi (Гуси) – The Geese (III.15)
- Svin’ya (Свинья) – The Pig (III.16)
- Mukha i Dorozhnye (Муха и Дорожные) – The Fly and the Travelers (III.17)
- Oryol i Pauк (Орел и Паук) – The Eagle and the Spider (III.18)
- Lan’ i Dervish (Лань и Дервиш) – The Doe and the Dervish (III.19)
- Sobaka (Собака) – The Dog (III.20)
- Oryol i Krot (Орёл и Крот) – The Eagle and the Mole (III.21)

Book Four

- Kvartet (Квартет) – The Quartet (IV.1)
- Listy i Korni (Листы и Корни) – The Leaves and the Roots (IV.2)
- Volk i Lisica (Волк и Лисица) – The Wolf and the Fox (IV.3)
- Bumazhnyj Zmej (Бумажный Змей) – The Paper Kite (IV.4)
- Lebed', Shhuka i Ra (Лебедь, Щука и Ра) – The Swan, the Pike, and the Crayfish (IV.5)
- Skvorec (Скворец) – The Starling (IV.6)
- Prud i Reka (Пруд и Река) – The Pond and the River (IV.7)
- Trishkin kaftan (Тришкин кафтан) – Trishka’s Caftan (IV.8)
- Mehanik (Механик) – The Mechanic (IV.9)
- Pozhar i Almaz (Пожар и Алмаз) – The Fire and the Diamond (IV.10)
- Pustynnik i Medved (Пустынник и Медведь) – The Hermit and the Bear (IV.11)
- Cvety (Цветы) – The Flowers (IV.12)
- Krest'janin i Zmeja (Крестьянин и Змея) – The Peasant and the Snake (IV.13)
- Krest'janin i Razbojnik (Крестьянин и Разбойник) – The Peasant and the Robber (IV.14)
- Ljubopytnyj (Любопытный) – The Curious (IV.15)
- Lev na lovle (Лев на ловле) – The Lion at the Hunt (IV.16)
- Kon' i Vsadnik (Конь и Всадник) – The Horse and the Rider (IV.17)
- Krest'jane i Reka (Крестьяне и Река) – The Peasants and the River (IV.18)
- Dobraja Lisiga (Добрая Лисига) – The Good Fox (IV.19)
- Mirskaja shodka (Мирская сходка) – The Community Meeting (IV.20)

Book Five

- Dem'janova uha (Демьянова уха) – Demian’s Fish Soup (V.1)
- Mysh' i Krysa (Мышь и Крыса) – The Mouse and the Rat (V.2)
- Chizh i Golub (Чиж и Голубь) – The Siskin and the Dove (V.3)
- Vodolazy (Водолазы) – The Divers (V.4)
- Gospozha i dve Sluzhanki (Госпожа и две Служанки) – The Squire’s Wife and the Two Servant Girls (V.5)
- Kamen' i Chervjak (Камень и Червяк) – The Stone and the Worm (V.6)
- Medved' u Pchel (Медведь у Пчёл) – The Bear and the Bees (V.7)
- Zerkalo i Obez'jana (Зеркало и Обезьяна) – The Mirror and the Monkey (V.8)
- Komar i Pastuh (Комар и Пастух) – The Mosquito and the Shepherd (V.9)
- Krest'janin i Smert (Крестьянин и Смерть) – The Peasant and Death (V.10)
- Rycar (Рыцарь) – The Knight (V.11)
- Ten' i Chelovek (Тень и Человек) – The Shadow and the Man (V.12)
- Krest'janin i Topor (Крестьянин и Топор) – The Peasant and the Axe (V.13)
- Lev i Volk (Лев и Волк) – The Lion and the Wolf (V.14)
- Sobaka, Chelovek, Koshka i Sokol (Собака, Человек, Кошка и Сокол) – The Dog, the Man, the Cat, and the Falcon (V.15)
- Podagra i Pauk (Подагра и Паук) – The Gout and the Spider (V.16)
- Lev i Lisica (Лев и Лисица) – The Lion and the Fox (V.17)
- Hmel (Хмель) – The Hop (V.18)
- Slon v sluchae (Слон в случае) – The Elephant in Favor (V.19)
- Tucha chem (Туча чем) – The Cloud (V.20)
- Klevetnik i Zmeja (Клеветник и Змея) – The Slanderer and the Snake (V.21)
- Fortuna i Nishhij (Фортуна и Нищий) – Fortune and the Beggar (V.22)
- Ljagushka i Jupiter (Лягушка и Юпитер) – The Frog and Jupiter (V.23)
- Lisa-Stroitel (Лиса-Строитель) – The Fox Builder (V.24)
- Napraslina (Напраслина) – The False Accusation (V.25)
- Fortuna v gostjah (Фортуна в гостях) – Fortuna Comes to Visit (V.26)

Book Six

- Volk i Pastuhi (Волк и Пастухи) – The Wolf and the Shepherds (VI.1)
- Kukushka i Gorlinka (Кукушка и Горлинка) – The Cuckoo and the Dove (VI.2)
- Greben (Гребень) – The Comb (VI.3)
- Skupoj i Kurica (Скупой и Курица) – The Miser and the Hen (VI.4)
- Dve Bochki (Две Бочки) – The Two Barrels (VI.5)
- Alkid (Алкид) – Alcides (VI.6)
- Apelles i Osljonok (Апеллес и Ослёнок) – Apelles and the Donkey (VI.7)
- Ohotnik (Охотник) – The Hunter (VI.8)
- Mal'chik i Zmeja (Мальчик и Змея) – The Boy and the Snake (VI.9)
- Plovec i More (Пловец и Море) – The Swimmer and the Sea (VI.10)
- Osel i Muzhik (Осёл и Мужик) – The Donkey and the Peasant (VI.11)
- Volk i Zhuravl (Волк и Журавль) – The Wolf and the Crane (VI.12)
- Pchela i Muhi (Пчела и Мухи) – The Bee and the Flies (VI.13)
- Muravej (Муравей) – The Ant (VI.14)
- Pastuh i More (Пастух и Море) – The Shepherd and the Sea (VI.15)
- Krest'janin i Zmeja (Крестьянин и Змея) – The Peasant and the Snake (VI.16)

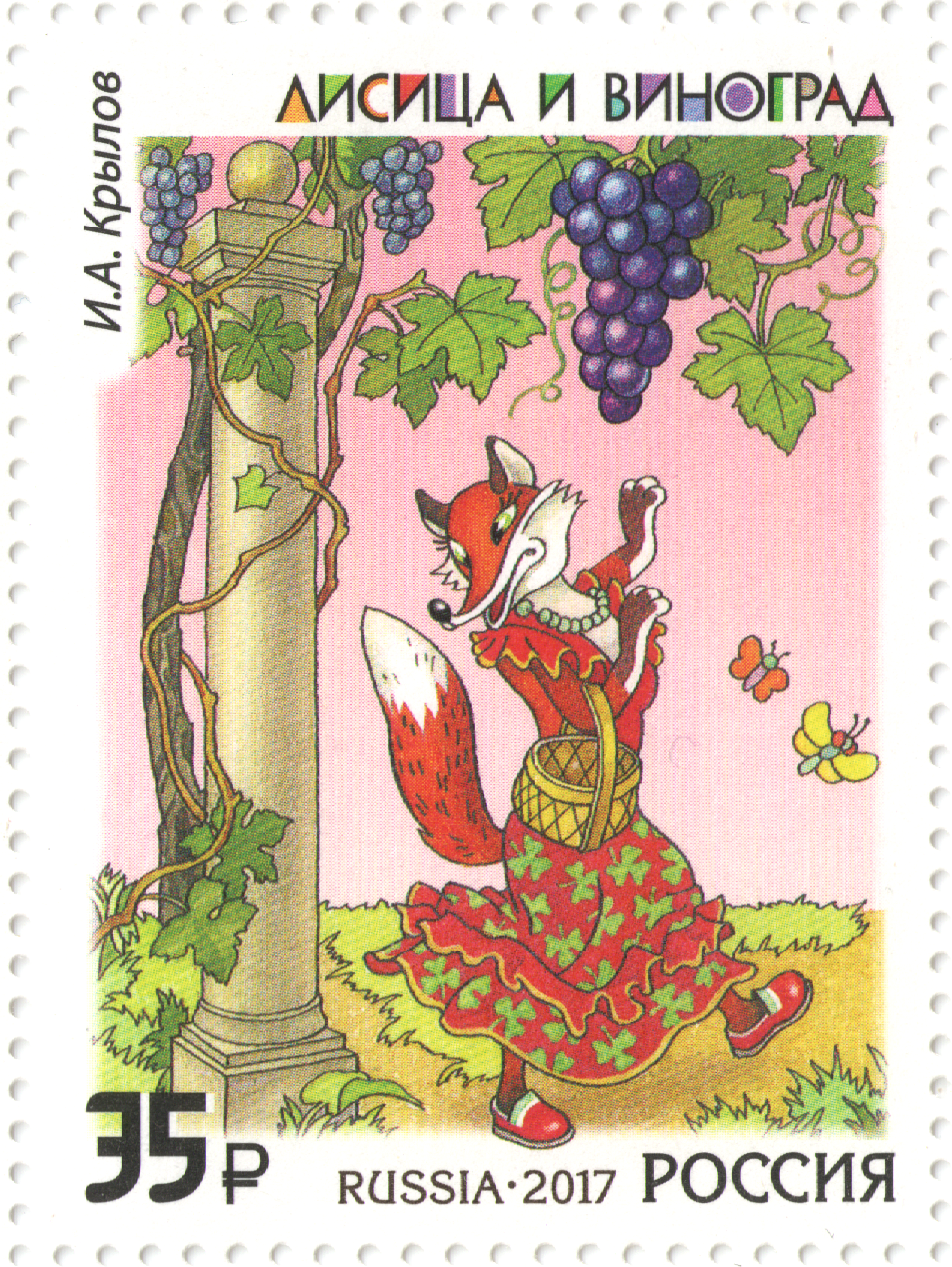
The Fox (Vixen) and the Grapes (Лисица и Виноград / Lisica i Vinograd) on a Russian stamp (2017)

- Lisica i Vinograd (Лисица и Виноград) – The Fox and the Grapes (VI.17)
- Ovtsy i Sobaki (Овцы и Собаки) – The Sheep and the Dogs (VI.18)
- Medved’ v Setyakh (Медведь в сетях) – The Bear in the Net (VI.19)
- Kolos (Колос) – The Ear of Wheat (VI.20)
- Mal’chik i Chervyak (Мальчик и Червяк) – The Boy and the Worm (VI.21)
- Pokhorony (Похороны) – The Funeral (VI.22)
- Trudolyubivyy Medved’ (Трудолюбивый Медведь) – The Hardworking Bear (VI.23)
- Sochinitel’ i Razboynik (Сочинитель и Разбойник) – The Writer and the Robber (VI.24)
- Yagnyonok (Ягнёнок) – The Lamb (VI.25)

Book Seven

- Sovet Myshej (Совет Мышей) – The Council of Mice (VII.1)
- Mel'nik (Мельник) – The Miller (VII.2)
- Bulyzhnik (Булыжник) – The Cobblestone (VII.3)
- Mot i Lastochka (Мот и Ласточка) – The Spendthrift and the Swallow (VII.4)
- Plotichka (Плотичка) – The Little Raft (VII.5)
- Krest'janin i Zeja (Крестьянин и Зея) – The Peasant and the Zeya (VII.6)
- Svin'ja pod Dubom (Свинья под Дубом) – The Pig under the Oak (VII.7)
- Pauk i Pchela (Паук и Пчела) – The Spider and the Bee (VII.8)
- Lisica i Osel (Лисица и Осёл) – The Fox and the Donkey (VII.9)
- Muha i Pchela (Муха и Пчела) – The Fly and the Bee (VII.10)
- Pestrye Ovcy (Пёстрые Овцы) – The Motley Sheep (VII.11)
- Zmeja i Ovca (Змея и Овца) – The Snake and the Sheep (VII.12)
- Kotel i Gorshok (Котёл и Горшок) – The Kettle and the Pot (VII.13)
- Dikie Kozy (Дикие Козы) – The Wild Goats (VII.14)
- Solov'i (Соловьи) – The Nightingales (VII.15)
- Golik (Голик) – Golik (VII.16)
- Krest'janin i Ovca (Крестьянин и Овца) – The Peasant and the Sheep (VII.17)
- Skupoj (Скупой) – The Miser (VII.18)
- Vel'mozha i Pojet (Вельможа и Поэт) – The Nobleman and the Poet (VII.19)
- Volk i Myshonok (Волк и Мышонок) – The Wolf and the Little Mouse (VII.20)
- Dva Muzhika (Два Мужика) – Two Peasants (VII.21)
- Kotenok i Skvorec (Котёнок и Скворец) – The Kitten and the Starling (VII.22)
- Dve Sobaki (Две Собаки) – Two Dogs (VII.23)
- Koshka i Solovej (Кошка и Соловей) – The Cat and the Nightingale (VII.24)
- Ryb'i pljaski (Рыбьи пляски) – Fish Dances (VII.25)
- Prihozhanin (Прихожанин) – The Parishioner (VII.26)
- Vorona (Ворона) – The Crow (VII.27)

Book Eight

- Lev sostarevshijsja (Лев состаревшийся) – The Aged Lion (VIII.1)
- Lev, Serna i Lisa (Лев, Серна и Лиса) – The Lion, the Chamois, and the Fox (VIII.2)
- Krest'janin i Loshad (Крестьянин и Лошадь) – The Peasant and the Horse (VIII.3)
- Belka (Белка) – The Squirrel (VIII.4)
- Shhuka (Щука) – The Pike (VIII.5)
- Kukushka i Orel (Кукушка и Орёл) – The Cuckoo and the Eagle (VIII.6)
- Britvy (Бритвы) – Razors (VIII.7)
- Sokol i Chervja (Сокол и Червя) – The Falcon and the Worm (VIII.8)
- Bednyj Bogach (Бедный Богач) – The Poor Rich Man (VIII.9)
- Bulat (Булат) – Bulat (VIII.10)
- Kupec (Купец) – The Merchant (VIII.11)
- Pushki i Parusa (Пушки и Паруса) – Cannons and Sails (VIII.12)
- Osel (Осёл) – The Donkey (VIII.13)
- Miron (Мирон) – Miron (VIII.14)
- Krest'janin i Lisica (Крестьянин и Лисица) – The Peasant and the Fox (VIII.15)
- Sobaka i Loshad (Собака и Лошадь) – The Dog and the Horse (VIII.16)
- Filin i Osel (Филин и Осёл) – The Owl and the Donkey (VIII.17)
- Zmeja (Змея) – The Snake (VIII.18)
- Volk i Kot (Волк и Кот) – The Wolf and the Cat (VIII.19)
- Leshhi (Лещи) – The Bream (VIII.20)
- Vodopad i Ruchej (Водопад и Ручей) – The Waterfall and the Brook (VIII.21)
- Lev (Лев) – The Lion (VIII.22)
- Tri Muzhika (Три Мужика) – Three Peasants (VIII.23)

Book Nine

- Pastuh (Пастух) – The Shepherd (IX.1)
- Belka (Белка) – The Squirrel (IX.2)
- Myshi (Мыши) – The Mice (IX.3)
- Lisa (Лиса) – The Fox (IX.4)
- Volki i Ovcy (Волки и Овцы) – Wolves and Sheep (IX.5)
- Krest'janin i Sobaka (Крестьянин и Собака) – The Peasant and the Dog (IX.6)
- Dva Mal'chika (Два Мальчика) – Two Boys (IX.7)
- Razbojnik i Izvoshhik (Разбойник и Извощик) – The Robber and the Coachman (IX.8)
- Lev i Mysh (Лев и Мышь) – The Lion and the Mouse (IX.9)
- Kukushka i Petuh (Кукушка и Петух) – The Cuckoo and the Rooster (IX.10)
- Vel'mozha (Вельможа) – The Nobleman (IX.11)

=== Additional Fables ===
Fables not included in the Nine Books

- Stydlivoj igrok (Стыдливой игрок) – The Shy Gambler
- Sud'ba igrokov (Судьба игроков) – The Fate of Gamblers
- Pavlin i solovej (Павлин и соловей) – The Peacock and the Nightingale
- Ne vo vremja gosti (Не во время гости) – Guests at the Wrong Time
- Lev i chelovek (Лев и человек) – The Lion and the Man
- Pir (Пир) – The Feast

Basni nedorabotannye (Басни недоработанные) – Incomplete Fables

- Kupec i vory (Купец и воры) – The Merchant and the Thieves
- Podsvechnik i ogarok (Подсвечник и огарок) – The Candlestick and the Stub
- Dva izvoshhika (Два извощика) – Two Coachmen

Basni nezakonchennye (Басни незаконченные) – Unfinished Fables

- Samonadejannyj osel (Самонадеянный осёл) – The Presumptuous Donkey
- Orel i ohotnik (Орел и охотник) – The Eagle and the Hunter
- Vit' vremja ne ptica (Вить время не птица) – Time is Not a Bird
- Fedjushin kaftanchik (Федюшин кафтанчик) – Fedya’s Little Caftan
- Zhivotnye-stroiteli (Животные-строители) – Builder Animals

Nabroski i zamysly basen (Наброски и замыслы басен) – Drafts and Fable Plans

- Chelovek i zmeja (Человек и змея) – Man and the Snake
- Syn (Сын) – The Son
- Sestrica (Сестрица) – The Sister
- Zajac (Заяц) – The Hare
- Krest'janin i zmeja (Крестьянин и змея) – The Peasant and the Snake
- Muzhik i lisa (Мужик и лиса) – The Peasant and the Fox
- Lisiga i kury (Лисига и куры) – The Fox and the Hens
- Nu svat (Ну сват) – The Matchmaker
- Cypljata (Цыплята) – The Chicks
- Hramostroitel (Храмостроитель) – The Temple Builder
- Slepoj nishhij i mal'chik (Слепой нищий и мальчик) – The Blind Beggar and the Boy

Shutochnye basni (Шуточные басни) – Humorous Fables

- Pauk i grom (Паук и гром) – The Spider and Thunder
- Osel i zajac (Осёл и заяц) – The Donkey and the Hare
- Komar i volk (Комар и волк) – The Mosquito and the Wolf

Basni, prinadlezhnost (Басни, принадлежность) – Fables, Attribution

- Olen' i zajac (Олень и заяц) – The Deer and the Hare
- Rodiny (Родины) – Homeland
- Sonlivyj (Сонливый) – The Sleepyhead
- Novopozhalovannyj osel (Новопожалованный осёл) – The Newly Granted Donkey
- Kartina (Картина) – The Picture
- Obed u medvedja (Обед у медведя) – Dinner at the Bear’s

=== Appendix ===
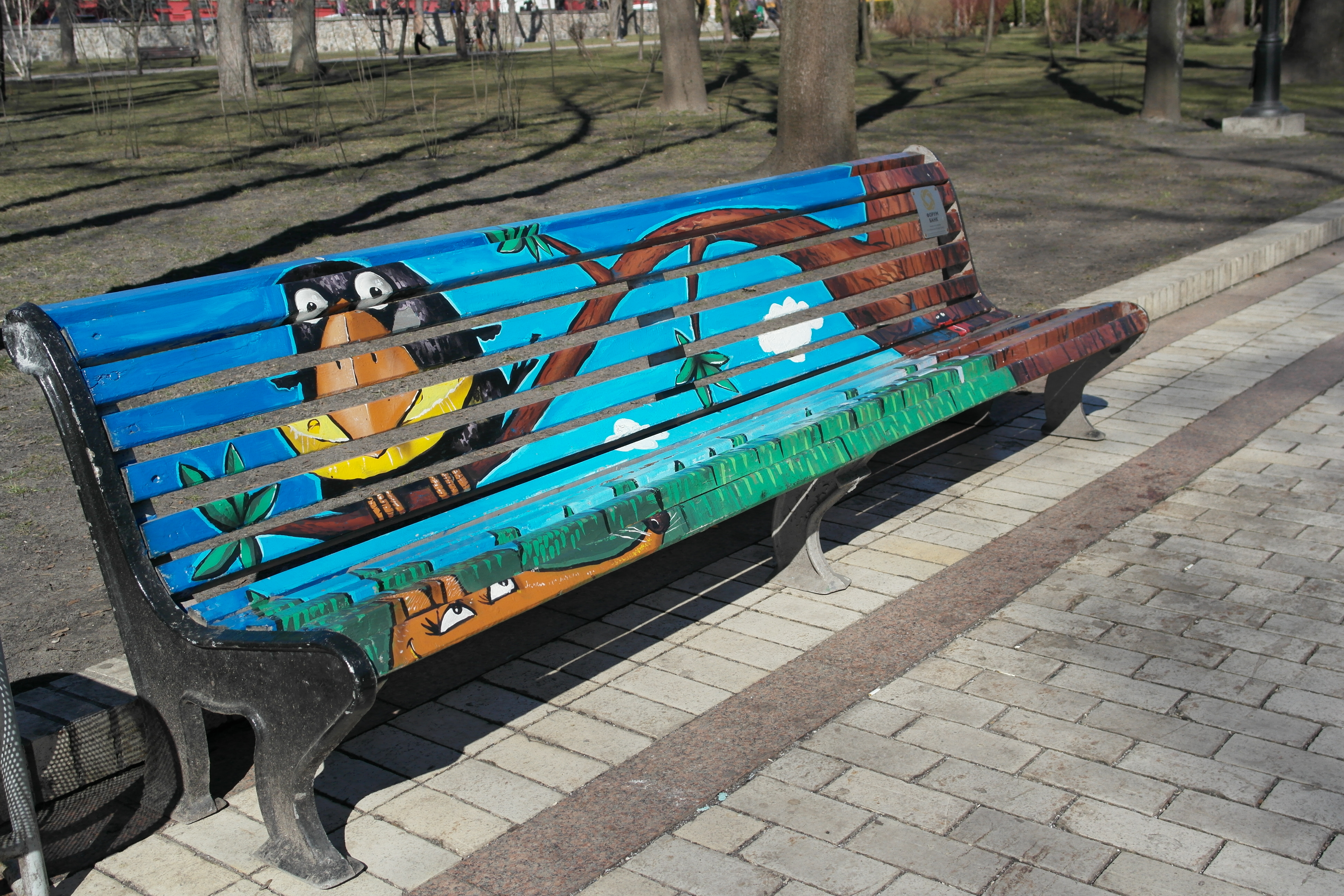
The Crow and the Fox (Ворона и Лисица / Vorona i Lisica), illustration on a park bench

Titles in the German edition (Ferdinand Löwe) of the Nine Books, Leipzig 1874 (after the order of Krylov):

Erstes Buch
1. Der Rabe und der Fuchs 2. Die Eiche und das Rohr 3. Die Musikanten 4. Die Krähe und das Huhn 5. Die Truhe 6. Der Frosch und der Stier 7. Die wählerische Maid 8. Der Parnaß 9. Das Orakel 10. Die Kornblume 11. Der Hain und das Feuer 12. Der Zeisig und der Igel 13. Der Wolf und das Lamm 14. Die Affen 15. Die Meise 16. Der Esel 17. Der Affe und die Brillen 18. Die beiden Tauben 19. Das Goldstück 20. Der Mann von drei Weibern 21. Die Gottlosen 22. Der Adler und die Hennen

Zweites Buch
1. Die Frösche, die einen Zar haben wollten 2. Der Löwe und der Panther 3. Der große Herr und der Philosoph 4. Die Pest unter den Thieren 5. Hundefreundschaft 6. Die Theilung 7. Das Faß 8. Der Wolf im Hundezwinger 9. Der Bach 10. Der Fuchs und das Murmelthier 11. Die Spaziergänger und die Hunde 12. Die Libelle und die Ameise 13. Der Lügner 14. Der Adler und die Biene 15. Der Hase auf der Jagd 16. Der Hecht und der Kater 17. Der Wolf und der Kukuk 18. Der Hahn und die Perle 19. Der Bauer und sein Knecht 20. Der Wagenzug 21. Die junge Krähe 22. Der Elefant als Gouverneur 23. Der Esel und die Nachtigall

Drittes Buch
1. Der Branntweinpächter und der Schuster 2. Der Bauer im Unglück3. Der Herr und die Mäuse 4. Der Elefant und der Mops 5. Der alte und der junge Wolf 6. Der Affe 7. Der Sack 8. Der Koch und der Kater 9. Der Löwe und die Mücke 10. Der Küchengärtner und der Philosoph 11. Der Bauer und der Fuchs 12. Die Erziehung des Löwen 13. Der Greis und die drei Jünglinge 14. Der Baum 15. Die Gänse 13. Der Greis und die drei Jünglinge 14. Der Baum 15. Die Gänse 16. Die Sau 17. Die Fliege und die Reisenden 18. Der Adler und die Spinne 19. Die Hindin und der Derwisch 20. Der Hund 21. Der Adler und der Maulwurf

Viertes Buch
1. Das Quartett 2. Die Blätter und die Wurzeln 3. Der Wolf und der Fuchs 101 4. Der Papierdrache 101 5. Der Schwan, der Hecht und der Krebs 6. Der Star 7. Der Teich und der Fluß 8. Trischka's Rock 9. Der Mechanikus 10. Die Feuersbrunst und der Diamant 11. Der Eremit und der Bär 12. Die Blumen 13. Der Bauer und die Schlange 14. Der Bauer und der Räuber 15. Der Wißbegierige 16. Der Löwe als Jagdgenosse 17. Das Roß und der Reiter 18. Die Bauern und der Fluß 19. Der gutherzige Fuchs 20. Der Landtag

Fünftes Buch
1. Demjan's Fischbrühe 2. Die Maus und die Natte 3. Der Zeisig und die Taube 4. Die Taucher 5. Die Herrin und ihre beiden Mägde 6. Der Stein und der Wurm 7. Der Bär bei den Bienen 8. Der Spiegel und der Affe 9. Die Mücke und der Hirt 10. Der Bauer und der Tod 11. Der Ritter 12. Der Schatten und der Mensch 13. Der Bauer und das Beil 14. Der Löwe und der Wolf 15. Der Hund, der Mensch, die Katze und der Falke 16. Podagra und Spinne 17. Der Löwe und der Fuchs 18. Der Hopfen 19. Der Elefant in Gnaden 20. Die Wolke 21. Der Verleumder und die Schlange 22. Fortuna und der Bettler 23. Der Frosch und Zeus 24. Der Fuchs als Architekt 25. Die falsche Anschuldigung 26. Fortuna als Gast

Sechstes Buch
1. Der Wolf und die Hirten 2. Der Kukuk und die Turteltaube 3. Der Kamm 4. Der Geizhals und die Henne 5. Die beiden Fässer 6. Herkules 7. Apelles und das Eselein 8. Der Jäger 9. Der Knabe und die Schlange 10. Der Schiffer und das Meer 11. Der Esel und der Bauer 12. Der Wolf und der Kranich 13. Die Biene und die Fliegen 14. Die Ameise 15. Der Hirt und das Meer 16. Der Bauer und die Schlange 17. Der Fuchs und die Trauben 18. Die Schafe und die Hunde 19. Der Bär im Netz 20. Die Aehre 21. Der Knabe und der Wurm 22. Das Begräbniß 23. Der arbeitliebende Bär 24. Der Schriftsteller und der Räuber 25. Das Lämmchen

Siebentes Buch
1. Der Mäuse Rath 2. Der Müller 3. Der Kiesel und der Diamant 4. Der Verschwender und die Schwalbe 5. Die Forelle 6. Der Bauer und die Schlange 7. Die Sau unter der Eiche 8. Die Spinne und die Biene 9. Der Fuchs und der Esel 10. Die Biene und die Fliege 11. Die Schlange und das Schaf 12. Der Kessel und der Topf 13. Die wilden Ziegen 14. Die Nachtigallen 15. Der Besen 16. Der Bauer und das Schaf 17. Der Geizhals 18. Der Reiche und der Poet 205 19. Der Wolf und das Mäuslein 20. Die beiden Bauern 21. Der junge Kater und der Staar 22. Die beiden Hunde 23. Die Kaze und die Nachtigall 24. Der Fische Tanz 25. Der Eingepfarrte 26. Die Krähe

Achtes Buch
1. Der gealterte Löwe 2. Der Löwe, die Gemse und der Fuchs 3. Der Bauer und das Pferd 4. Das Eichhörnchen 5. Der Hecht 6. Der Kukuk und der Adler 7. Die Rasirmesser 8. Der Falke und der Wurm 9. Der arme Reiche 10. Der Stahl 11. Der Kaufmann 12. Die Kanonen und die Segel 13. Der Esel 14. Herr Stein 15. Der Bauer und der Fuchs 16. Der Hund und das Pferd 17. Der Uhu und der Esel 18. Die Schlane 19. Der Wolf und der Kater 20. Die Brachsen 21. Der Wasserfall und der Quell 22. Der Löwe 23. Die drei Bauern

Neuntes Buch
1. Der Schäfer 2. Das Eichhörnchen 3. Die Mäuse 4. Der Fuchs. 5. Die Wölfe und die Schafe 6. Der Bauer und der Hund 7. Die beiden Knaben 8. Der Räuber und der Kärrner 9. Der Löwe und die Maus 10. Der Kukuk und der Hahn 11. Der Magnat

Anhang
Der Löwe und der Mensch
Die bunten Schafe
Das Gastmahl

== See also ==
- Monument to Ivan Krylov in the Summer Garden (in Russian)

== Bibliography (in selection) ==
- I. A. Krylov: Basni [Fables]. Moscow/Leningrad 1956 (Online) - in Russian
- Kriloff's original Fables. Translated by Henry Harrison. London 1883
- Krilof and His Fables, translated by W. R. S. Ralston, 1869 (197 fables)
- C. Fillingham Coxwell: Kriloff's Fables. Translated from the Russian into English in the Original Metres. London 1920 (Online)
- Krylof's sämmtliche Fabeln. Aus dem Russischen übersetzt und mit einer Einleitung begleitet von Ferdinand Löwe. F. A. Brockhaus, Leipzig 1874 - in German
- Fabeln von Krylow. St. Petersburg 1863 - in German
- Iwan Krylow's Fabeln in acht Büchern. Aus dem Russischen von Ferdinand Torney. Mitau und Leipzig 1842 - in German
