= The Fox and the Crow (Aesop) =

Aesop's fable

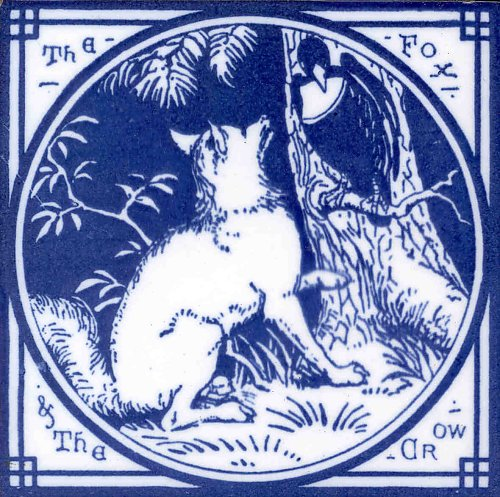
A 19th-century Minton tile illustrating the fable

The Fox and the Crow is one of Aesop's Fables, numbered 124 in the Perry Index. Early Latin and Greek versions and the fable exist, and it may even have been depicted on an ancient Greek vase. The story serves as a cautionary tale against heeding flattery.

== The story ==
In the fable, a crow has found a piece of cheese and retired to a branch to eat it. A fox, wanting it for himself, flatters the crow, calling her beautiful and wondering whether her voice is as sweet to match. When the crow lets out a caw, the cheese falls and is devoured by the fox.

The earliest surviving versions of the fable, in both Greek and Latin, date from the 1st century of the Common Era. Evidence that it was well known before then comes in the poems of the Latin poet Horace, who alludes to it twice. Addressing a maladroit sponger called Scaeva in his Epistles, the poet counsels guarded speech for "if the crow could have fed in silence, he would have had better fare, and much less of quarreling and of envy". The second reference to the fable appears in Horace's satire on legacy hunting (II.5):

A season'd Scrivener, bred in Office low,
Full often mocks, and dupes the gaping crow.

The poem has generally been taken as a caution against listening to flatterers. Phaedrus prefaces his Latin poem with the warning that the one 'who takes delight in treacherous flattery usually pays the penalty by repentance and disgrace'. One of the few who gives it a different interpretation is Odo of Cheriton, whose lesson is that virtue is forgotten in the pursuit of ambition. Babrius has the fox end with a joke at the crow's credulity in his Greek version of the story: 'You were not dumb, it seems, you have indeed a voice; you have everything, Sir Crow, except brains.' In La Fontaine's Fables (I.2), the fox delivers the moral by way of recompense for the tidbit. In Norman Shapiro's translation:

Flatterers thrive on fools' credulity.
The lesson's worth a cheese, don't you agree?"
The crow, shamefaced and flustered swore,
Too late, however: "Nevermore!"

As was the case with several others of La Fontaine's fables, there was dissatisfaction in Christian circles, where it was felt that morality was offended by allowing the fox to go unpunished for its theft. Therefore, a sequel was provided in the form of a popular song of which a version is recorded in Saskatchewan. In this, the fox's funeral is dolefully described but ends with the crow cawing from its branch,

I'm not at all sorry, now that he's dead,
He took my cheese and ate it in my stead,
He's punished by fate – God, you've avenged me.

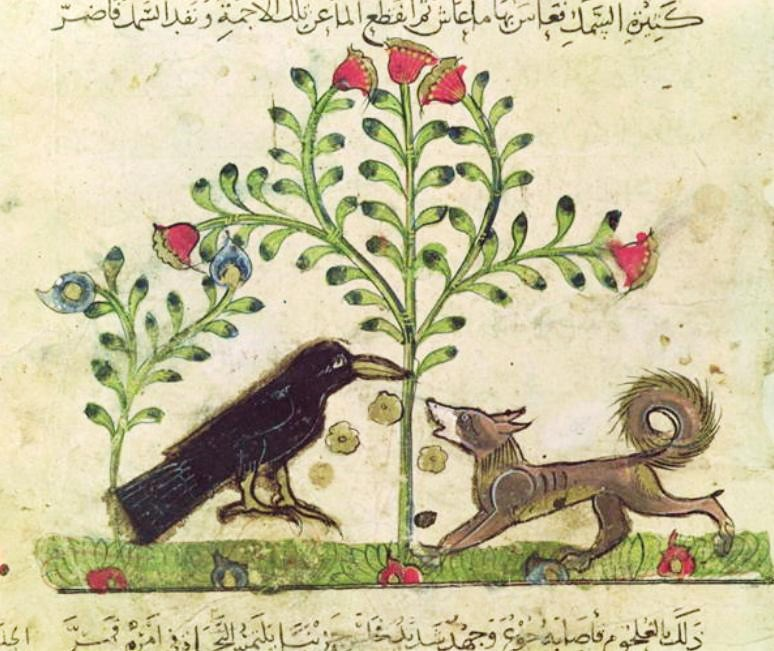
An illustration of the Indian fable as told in the Arabic Kalila and Dimna

The German writer Gotthold Ephraim Lessing, who had decided views on how fables should be written, gave Aesop's Der Rabe und der Fuchs an ironic twist. In his rewritten version, a gardener has left poisoned meat out to kill invading rats. It is this that the raven picks up but is flattered out of it by the fox, which then dies in agony. To emphasise the moral he is drawing, Lessing concludes with the curse, 'Abominable flatterers, may you all be so rewarded with one poison for another!'.

An Eastern story of flattery rewarded exists in the Buddhist scriptures as the Jambhu-Khadaka-Jataka. In this, a jackal praises the crow's voice as it is feeding in a rose-apple tree. The crow replies that it requires nobility to discover the same in others and shakes down some fruit for the jackal to share.

What seems to be a depiction of the tale on a painted vase discovered in excavations at Lothal from the Indus Valley Civilisation suggests that the story may have been known there at least a thousand years earlier than any other source. In this scene, the bird is depicted perched on a tree holding a fish, while a fox-looking animal is underneath.

== Musical versions ==
Since the fable stands at the beginning of La Fontaine's fables, generations of French children commonly learned it by heart. This will explain the many settings by French composers. They include:

- Louis-Nicolas Clérambault
- Jacques Offenbach in Six Fables de La Fontaine (1842) for soprano and small orchestra (performance available on YouTube)
- Charles Gounod in a setting for a cappella voices (1857)
- Benjamin Godard, the third of Six Fables de La Fontaine for voice and piano, op. 17 (1872/9)
- Louis Lacombe in a setting dated 1888
- Charles Lecocq in Six Fables de Jean de la Fontaine for voice and piano (1900), available on YouTube
- André Caplet in Trois Fables de Jean de la Fontaine (1919) for voice and piano, in a forcefully dramatised version
- Maurice Delage in Deux fables de Jean de la Fontaine (1931)
- Marie-Madeleine Duruflé as the sixth in her 6 Fables de La Fontaine for a cappella female voices (1960)
- Joseph Noyon in a song setting
- Jean-René Quignard for 2 children's voices
- Claude Ballif as the second in his Chansonettes : 5 Fables de La Fontaine for small mixed choir (Op.72, Nº1 1995)
- Dominique Preschez as the first of his Trois fables en une for small orchestra and soprano (1995)
- Jacques Frochot made a setting for a cappella choir (1996)
- Vladimir Cosma, as the fifth piece in Eh bien ! Dansez maintenant (2006), a light-hearted interpretation for narrator and orchestra in the style of an accordion waltz

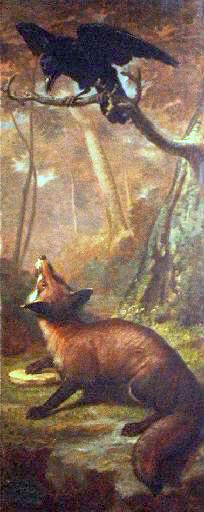
Léon Rousseau's painted panel of the fable, Musée Jean de La Fontaine

There was also a setting of the French words by the Dutch composer Rudolf Koumans in Vijf fabels van La Fontaine (op. 25, 1968) for school chorus and orchestra. In 1995 Xavier Benguerel i Godó set a Catalan translation of the fable for recitation with orchestra in his 7 Fábulas de la Fontaine.

Isabelle Aboulker included the fable among the seven in her children's 'fabl'opera' La Fontaine et le Corbeau (1977) for mezzo-soprano, baritone, children's voices and small chamber orchestra. Jean-Marie Morel (b. 1934) also exploits its dramatic possibilities in what he describes as his small cantata, La Fontaine en chantant (1999), for children's choir and string quartet. David Edgar Walther prefers the term 'short operatic drama' for his Aesop's Fables (2009), a 12-minute cycle with libretto by the composer in which "The Fox and The Raven" appears as the first of three pieces. The fable was also choreographed by Dominique Hervieu in 2003 for Annie Sellem's composite ballet project, Les Fables à la Fontaine. In it two dancers perform to a sound fusion score accompanied by video affects.

Other composers went directly to Aesop for their inspiration. In English these include the eleventh item in A Selection of Aesop's Fables Versified and Set to Music with Symphonies and Accompaniments for the Piano Forte (London 1847) and the fifth in Mabel Wood Hill's Aesop's Fables Interpreted Through Music (New York 1920). An English version by Peter Westmore was set for children's voices and piano by Edward Hughes as the second of his ten Songs from Aesop's Fables (1965) and Greg Smith included it in his "Aesop's Fables" for four-part chorus of mixed voices and piano accompaniment (New York/London 1979). In Germany, under the title Der Fuchs und der Rabe, Werner Egk set the fable for children's performance in 1932 and the Swiss composer Bertrand Gay wrote a setting for 2 trumpets, narrator and piano. It was Martin Luther's verse translation that Hans Poser included as the third piece in his Die Fabeln des Äsop for accompanied men's choir (0p.28, 1956). Ancient Greek is used in Lefteris Kordis' setting for octet and voice (2010) among his Songs for Aesop's Fables, which has now been recorded under the title "Oh Raven, If You Only Had Brains!"

“The Fox, The Crow, and The Cookie”, off It’s All Crazy! It’s All False! It’s All A Dream! It’s Alright is a version of the fable recorded by American rock band mewithoutYou, which substitutes the cheese for a pastry.

== Other artistic applications ==
The fable is depicted no less than three times in the border of the Bayeux Tapestry and it has been speculated that a political commentary is intended. The picture is that of an ungainly bird sitting in a tree under which an animal is lying. They are looking at each other with their mouths open, and there is some object in the air between them. The reason for pointing to this particular fable is quite clear. Harold's vanity has led him to overreach himself and so lose everything. A later tapestry on which the story is portrayed came from the Gobelins Manufactory and was designed by Jean-Baptiste Oudry.

The fable also figured in church architecture, most notably on a column in the Romanesque church of San Martín de Tours in Spain. In later centuries the fable was used on household china, on tiles, on vases, and figured in the series of La Fontaine medals cast in France by Jean Vernon. A less conventional use was the hydraulic statue built for the Versailles Labyrinth that was constructed for Louis XIV, one of thirty nine sets of statues in the maze illustrating Aesop's fables. The fox and the crow eventually figured, among many other beasts, on the grandiose monument to La Fontaine designed by Achille Dumilâtre in 1891. This stood at the angle of the Jardins de Ranelagh between the Avenue Ingres and Avenue du Ranelagh in Paris XVI and was melted down during World War II. It was replaced by Charles Correia's present monument in 1983. This portrays the fabulist standing and looking down at the cheese-bearing crow at his feet, while the fox gazes up at it from the steps to the pedestal. In Russia, too, there was an adaptation of La Fontaine's fable by Ivan Krylov, "The Crow and the Fox" (in this case little different from the French original), which figures among several others on panels around Andrey Drevin's monument beside the Patriarch Ponds in Moscow.

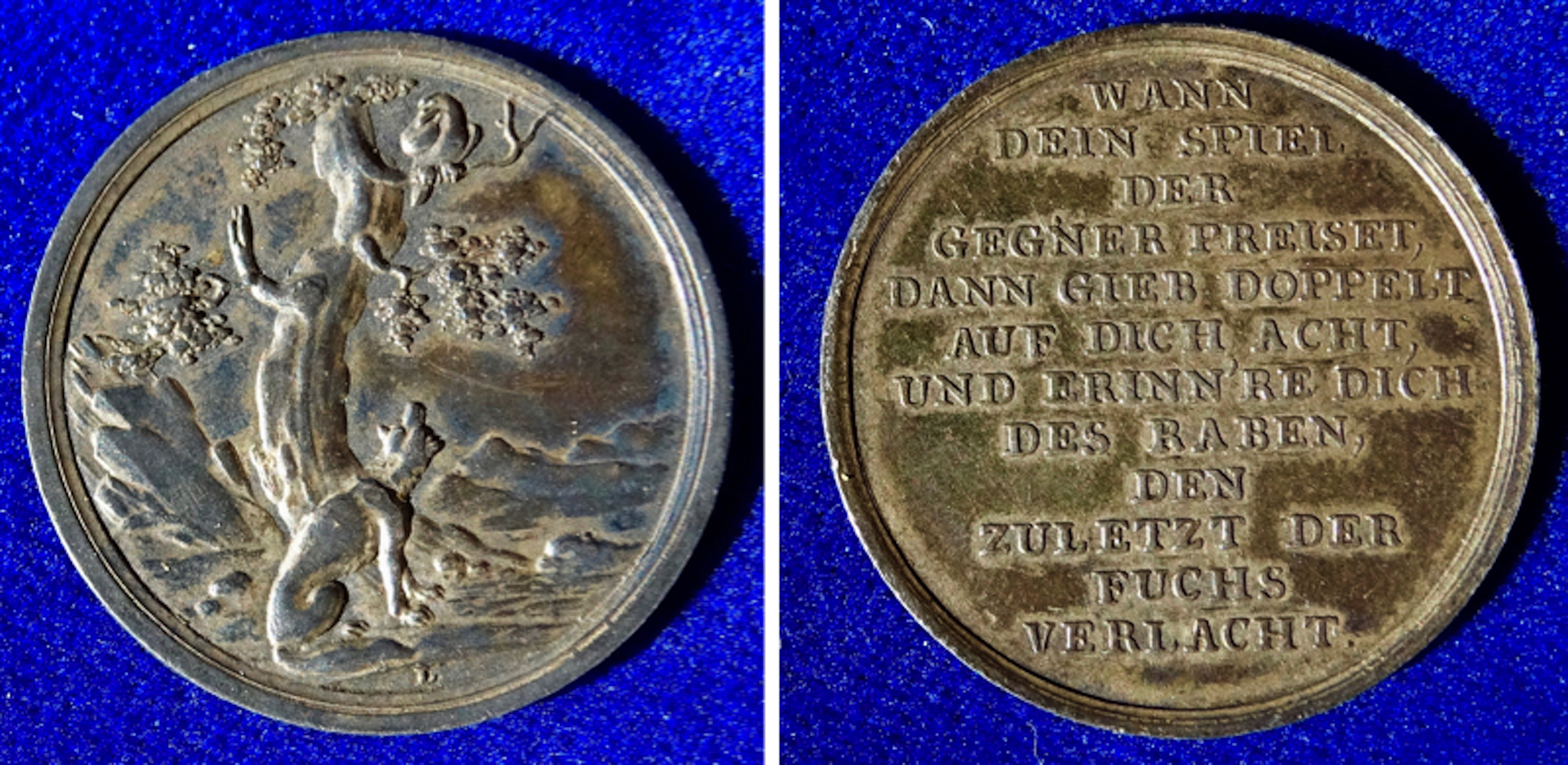
18th-century German Whist game silver token showing the fable The Fox and the Crow. Artist: Daniel Friedrich Loos.

In Germany the fable was popular, not simply because of Lessing's adaptation but from Martin Luther's versified translation. Several zoos there have sculptures based on the story, of which Stefan Horota has been responsible for two. In Rostock Zoo the fox looks up at a tree in which the bird is supposed to be perched. It is based on his 1965 bronze sculpture now beside a woodland path in the zoo at Gera. There a stylised crow stands with its head twisted sideways holding the cheese, while the fox sits looking upward with its snout just below the bird's beak. Then on the wall at the entrance of the small zoo at Weißwasser there is a ceramic plaque of the fable created by the local Culture-house some time before 1990. Another bronze group was made by Karlheinz Goedtke for the grounds of an apartment block in Lübeck (1974). There is also a sandstone stele in the grounds of the Lessing Museum in Kamenz. This takes the form of a rounded trunk with a leafy canopy, beneath which the crow perches on a shorn branch with the fox looking up at it below.

In the United States the fable figured at one time as one of six bronze gate panels commissioned for the William Church Osborne Memorial Playground in Manhattan's Central Park in 1952. The work of sculptor Paul Manship, it is now in the Smithsonian American Art Museum. The seated fox looks up at the crow in an attractive piece that makes the most of the decorative possibilities of the reeds and oak-leaves that play a prominent part in the overall design. The challenge with this subject is always to avoid the limitations imposed by a fable that has more dialogue than action. André Deluol also manages to vary the formula in the stone sculpture he created outside the La Fontaine infant school in the Croix-de-Vernailles quarter of Etampes in 1972. There the fox look back over its shoulder at the crow in a design held together by the large leaves of a stylised tree. An article is dedicated to the statue and versions of the fable.

Possibilities are more restricted in the two dimensional plane of a picture: whether printed or painted, these have presented an almost uniform monotony of design over whole centuries. One of the rare variations is the painted panel by Léon Rousseau (fl.1849-81) which pictures the fox crouching with one paw on the fallen cheese and bending his head directly upwards to taunt the agitated crow. There is also the 1961 print by the German artist Horst Janssen of a large striped fox looking up at a minute bird on a twig. Here it is the differences in size and the admiring prominence given the wily flatterer that constitutes its originality.

== Philately ==
The fable has been a favourite with stamp designers. Among the countries that have featured it are the following:

- Albania issued a 1995 set with several fables on each stamp; the fox and the crow is featured on the 3 leke stamp.
- France commemorated the third centenary of La Fontaine's death in 1995 with a set of six stamps featuring individual fables, of which this was one.
- Greece issued a 1987 set dedicated to Aesop's fables; the fox and the crow figures on the 32 drachma stamp.
- Hungary issued sets dedicated to the fables in both 1960 and 1987; in the former the fox and the crow was on the 80 fillér(0.8 forint) stamp and on the 2 forint stamp in the latter.
- The Maldives issued a set in 1990 in which Walt Disney characters act out the fables; the fox and the crow appears on the 1 rufiyaa stamp.
- Monaco celebrated the 350th anniversary of the birth of Jean de la Fontaine in 1972 with a 50 centimes composite stamp on which the fox and the crow was one of the fables illustrated. The 3,86 value of 2021 celebrates the author's 400th anniversary with an illustration of this fable alone behind his portrait head.
- Niger celebrated the author's 350th anniversary with a set of air mail stamps which also incorporated the fable's moral; the fox and the crow figures on the 25 franc stamp and the design adapts elements of Léon Rousseau's panel.
- Poland issued a set dedicated to folk tales in 1980, designed by Helena Winogradow-Matuszewska and featuring this fable on the 40 groszy stamp.
