= Fox and Crane =

Ukrainian Fairy Tale

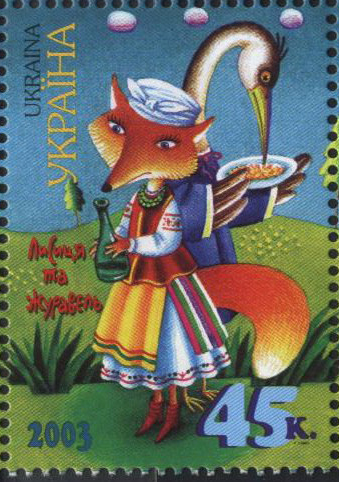
Fox and Crane, Ukrainian Folk Tale, national postal service of Ukraine, Ukrposhta, 2003

"Fox and Crane", or "The Fox and The Crane", or "The Vixen and the Crane" (Ukrainian: «Лисиця та журавель», romanized: Lysytsya ta zhuravel') is the title of a Ukrainian fairy tale, a fable with different plot lines known by the same or similar title. A version of "Fox and Crane" is retold by Irina Zheleznova. A version called "The Vixen and the Crane" was adapted by Ivan Franko.

== Plot variations ==
=== Vixen and Crane (Ivan Franko) ===
Vixen (a fox) and Crane (a crane) were friends. One day Vixen invited Crane to join it for lunch, promising all it had. When Crane arrived, it saw Vixen had prepared a meal of porridge. With its long beak, Crane was unable to eat the porridge. Meanwhile, Vixen ate the porridge until it was all gone, licking the plate, then asked Crane's forgiveness because it had no more food. Crane thanked Vixen, then invited Vixen to lunch the following day. The next day, Vixen arrived to find a meal of meat, beans, beets, and potatoes cut into small pieces by Crane and put into a tall pot with a narrow neck. The Vixen tried to eat, but could not reach inside the tall pot, either with mouth or paw. Meanwhile, Crane used its long beak to pull out piece after piece until all was finished. Crane then asked Vixen's forgiveness that all the food was gone. Having expected a full meal, Vixen left angrily, and ended its friendship with Crane.

=== Fox and Crane (Irina Zheleznova) ===
Fox (a fox) and Crane (a crane) meet in a forest. Crane asks Fox to give it shelter for the winter, and in return Crane promises Fox to teach it to fly. Both agreeing to the deal, Fox and Crane live together in Fox's hole.

Later, hunters find the hole, and begin digging to catch them. Fox asks Crane if they know of a way to save them, to which Crane answers that Crane knows ten different ways. In return, Fox answers that Fox knows only one way. Fox continues asking Crane how many ways it knows, and Crane replies the same way, except that each time Crane says it knows one less way then when asked before. When Crane replies that it only knows one way of saving them, Fox asks Crane to tell Fox what they should do. Crane replies that Crane will pretend to be dead at the top of the hole. When the hunters find Crane dead, they will be distracted, and in that time, Fox can run away, after which time Crane will fly away. They carry out the idea, and everything works as planned. Both Fox and Crane escape.

Afterward, Fox finds Crane and asks Crane to fulfill its promise to teach it to fly. Crane takes Fox upon its back and flies to the height of a house and drops Fox. Crane then asks Fox, who is unhurt, how Fox likes flying. Fox responds that it enjoyed flying. Crane takes Fox on its back again and flies to the height of the clouds, then drops Fox again. Crane then flies down and asks Fox how it liked flying, but there is no response, because Fox is dead. Crane sighs, then flies away.

== In popular culture ==
- The Ukrainian Folk Tale, Fox and Crane, was featured in a 2003 series of the Ukrainian national postal service, Ukrposhta.

== See also ==
- The Fox and the Stork
- Ukrainian Fairy Tale
