= The Crow and the Fox (Krylov's fable) =

Fable by Ivan Krylov

The Crow and the Fox (Russian: Ворона и Лисица, romanized: Vorona i Lisitsa) is a fable by Russian fabulist Ivan Krylov (1769–1844). It was first published in 1808 in the theatrical journal Dramatichesky Vestnik.

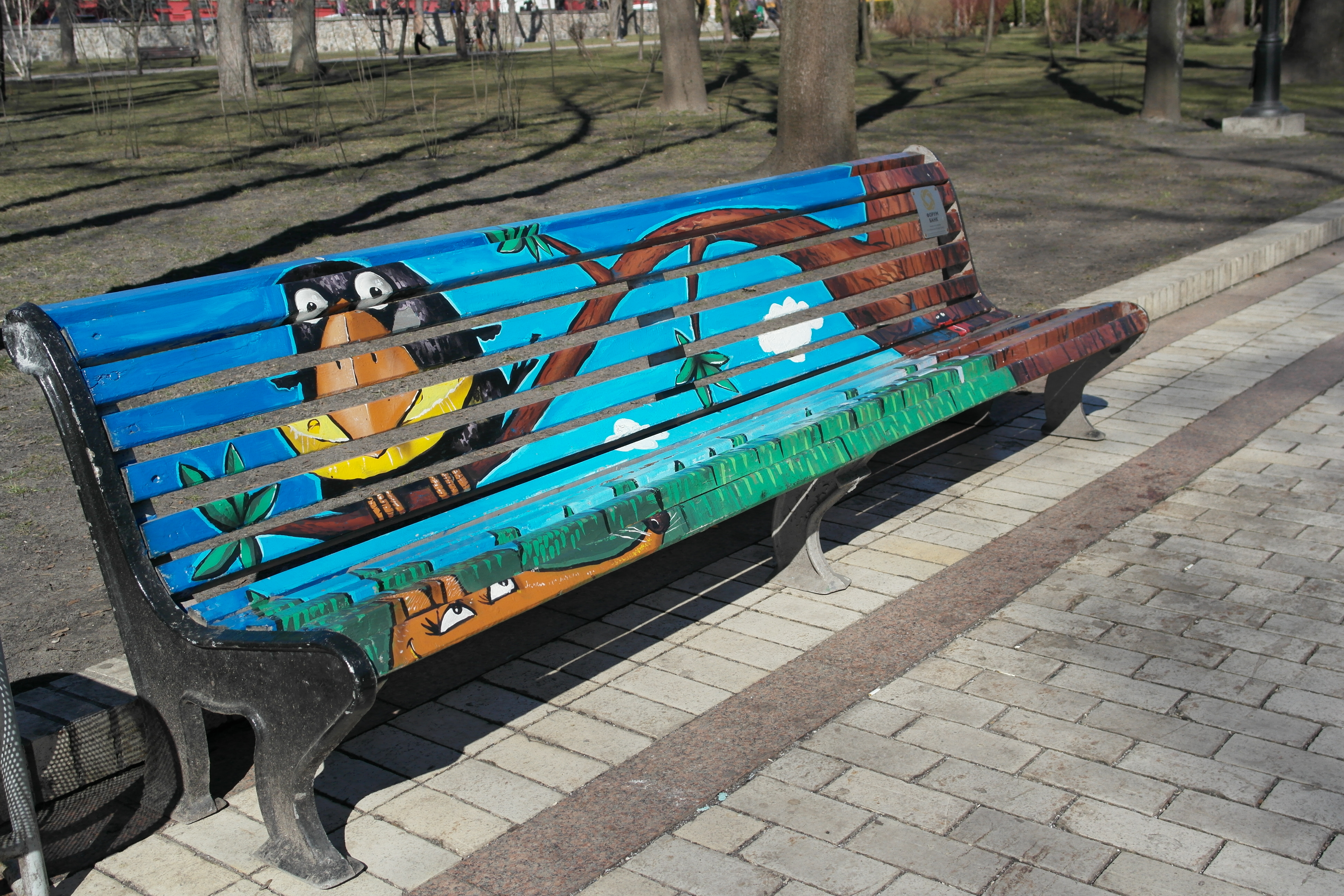
The Crow and the Fox (Ворона и Лисица / Vorona i Lisica), illustration on a park bench

== Background ==
Krylov drew on an older narrative tradition found in the works of Aesop (The Fox and the Crow), Phaedrus, Babrius, Ignatios the Deacon, Jean de La Fontaine (Le Corbeau et le Renard), Gotthold Ephraim Lessing, Alexander Sumarokov and Vasily Trediakovsky. Versions of the plot are widespread in classical and European fable literature.

== Synopsis ==
The fable opens with a moral introduction stating that flattery is harmful and dangerous; although everyone is aware of its nature, it still finds its way into people's hearts.

A crow obtains a piece of cheese and sits on a branch in order to eat it. A passing fox notices the cheese and decides to acquire it. The fox flatters the crow, praising her supposed beauty, and then asks her to sing with her “wonderful voice.”

The naïve, trusting crow is deceived by the flattery. When she opens her beak to sing, the cheese falls to the ground. The cunning fox seizes the cheese and runs away, leaving the crow without her breakfast.

== Moral ==
The moral of the fable is that flattery is dangerous and difficult to resist. Although people know flattery to be “bad and harmful,” they frequently fall into the traps of flatterers despite repeated warnings.

== Impact ==
Some phrases from this fable have become widely quoted Russian catchphrases and idioms.

== See also ==
- List of Krylov's fables
- Aesop's Fables
- La Fontaine's Fables

== Bibliography ==
- I. A. Krylov: Basni [Fables]. Moscow/Leningrad 1956 (Online) - in Russian
