= Colette (given name) =

Colette is a French feminine given name. Notable people with the name include:

- Colette of Corbie (1381–1447), Roman Catholic Saint
- Colette Alliot-Lugaz (born 1947), French soprano
- Colette Audry (1906–1990), French novelist, screenwriter and critic
- Colette Avital (born 1939), Israeli diplomat and politician
- Colette Baron-Reid (born 1958), Canadian spiritual medium
- Colette Bémont (1933–2023), French archaeologist
- Colette Besson (1946–2005), French athlete
- Colette Bonheur (real name: Colette Chailler, 1927–1966), Quebec singer
- Colette Boky (born 1935), French-Canadian operatic soprano
- Colette Boos-John (born 1969), German politician
- Colette Bourgonje (born 1962), Paralympic cross-country skier and athlete
- Colette Brand (born 1967), Swiss freestyle skier and Olympic medallist
- Colette Brosset (1922–2007), French actress, writer and choreographer
- Colette Brown (born 1969), British actress
- Colette Bryce (born 1970), Irish poet
- Colette Burson (born 1970), American screenwriter
- Colette Caillat (1921–2007), French professor of Sanskrit and comparative grammar
- Colette Capdevielle (born 1958), French politician
- Colette Capriles, Venezuelan academic
- Colette Carr (born 1991), American recording artist, rapper and songwriter
- Colette Cavanagh (born 1998), Scottish footballer
- Colette Deréal (1927–1988), French actress and singer
- Colette Descombes, French film actress
- Colette Doherty, Irish poker player
- Colette Fitzpatrick, Irish news anchor for TV3 Ireland
- Colette Flesch (1937–2026), Luxembourgish politician and fencer
- Colette Giudicelli (1943–2020), French politician and a member of the Senate of France
- Colette Gouvion, French journalist and author
- Colette Guillaumin (1934–2017), French sociologist
- Colette Guyard (born 1952), French footballer
- Colette Hayman, Australian fashion designer
- Colette Hiller, American actress
- Colette Hume, Welsh education correspondent for BBC Wales Today
- Colette Inez (1931–2018), American poet and composer
- Colette de Jouvenel (1913–1981), the daughter of French writer Sidonie-Gabrielle Colette and her second husband, Henri de Jouvenel
- Colette Justine (born 1952), French multimedia artist
- Colette Khoury (1931–2026), Syrian novelist and poet
- Colette Kreder (1934–2022), French engineer, entrepreneur and feminist
- Colette Kress (born 1967), American financial analyst and business executive
- Colette Langlade (born 1956), member of the National Assembly of France
- Colette Le Moal (born 1932), member of the National Assembly of France
- Colette Mann (born 1950), Australian actress
- Colette Marchand (1925–2015), French dancer and actress
- Colette Marino (born 1975), American house music DJ and vocalist
- Colette McSorley, Irish camogie player
- Colette Mélot (born 1947), member of the Senate of France
- Colette Nelson (born 1974), IFBB American professional bodybuilder
- Colette Omogbai (1943–?), pioneering Nigerian artist and printmaker
- Colette O'Neil (1937–2021), Scott actress
- Colette O'Niel (aka Lady Constance Malleson, 1895–1975), British writer and actress
- Colette Pechekhonova (born 1980), Russian fashion model
- Colette Peignot (1903–1938), French author
- Colette Renard (1924–2010), French actress and singer
- Colette Revenu (born 1944), French fencer
- Colette Reynaud (1872–1965), French feminist, socialist and pacifist journalist
- Colette Richard (1924–2020), French actress
- Colette Rolland (born 1943), French computer scientist
- Colette Rosambert, French tennis player
- Colette Rossant (1932–2023), French-American cookbook author, journalist, translator and restaurateur
- Colette Roy-Laroche (born 1943), Canadian politician
- Colette Sénami Agossou Houeto (born 1939), Beninese educator and a feminist poet
- Colette Solomon, South African policy researcher and women's rights activist
- Colette Trudeau (born 1985), Canadian singer and songwriter
- Colette Uys (born 2000), South African athlete
- Colette van den Keere (1568–1629), Dutch engraver
- Colette Worsman, American politician
- Rocio Colette Acuña Calzada (born 1982), aka Colettea, Mexican singer and contestant of La Academia

== Fictional characters ==
- Colette, a character from Brawl Stars
- Colette Brunel, character in Tales of Symphonia
- Colette Ferro, character from the 1986 movie Aliens
- Colette Flaherty, character in EastEnders in Ireland
- Colette Green, character in the videogame Half-Life: Decay
- Colette Hankinson, character in Coronation Street
- Colette Tatou, character in the film Ratatouille
- Colette Marchant, from the 2019 movie Dumbo (2019 film)
- Colette, one of the Thea Sisters from France in Thea Stilton

== See also ==
- Colette (disambiguation)
