= Colletta =

Colletta may refer to:

- Colletta di Castelbianco, Savona, Liguria, Italy

== People with the surname ==
- Mike Colletta (1927–2007), American businessman and politician
- Pietro Colletta (1775–1831), Neapolitan general and historian
- Vince Colletta (1923–1991), highly prolific American comic book artist and art director

== See also ==
- Coleta, Illinois
- Coletta (disambiguation)
- Collett (disambiguation)
- Collette, a given name and surname
