= Collett (name) =

Collett is both an English surname and a given name. Notable people with the name include:

- Collett (Norwegian family), including
  - Axel Collett (1880–1968), Norwegian landowner
  - Camilla Collett (1813–1895), Norwegian author
  - James Collett (1655–1727), English-Norwegian merchant; origin of the Norwegian Collett family
  - Johan Collett (1775–1827), Norwegian politician
  - Johan Christian Collett (1817–1895), Norwegian politician, son of Johan
  - Jonas Collett (1772–1851), Norwegian politician
  - Robert Collett (1842–1913), Norwegian zoologist

Other people with Collett as a surname:

- Andy Collett (born 1973), English retired football goalkeeper
- Anthony Collett (1877–1929), English author
- Arthur Henry Collett (1870–1930), Australian politician
- Ben Collett (born 1984), English footballer
- Charles Collett (1871–1952), British chief mechanical engineer of the Great Western Railway
- Charles E. Collett, American lawyer and water polo player
- Clive Franklyn Collett (1886–1917), British military pilot from New Zealand
- Dave Collett, pianist in the Avon Cities Jazz Band
- Elmer Collett (born 1944), American football player
- Ernie Collett (disambiguation), several people
- Gilbert Collett (1879–1945), English rugby union player
- Glenna Collett-Vare (1903–1989), American golfer
- Harry Collett (born 2004), English actor
- Sir Henry Collett (1836–1901), army officer in the East India Company and botanist
- Herbert Collett (1877–1947), Australian politician and soldier
- Jason Collett, Canadian musician
- John Collett (artist) (1725–1780), English painter
- John Collett (composer) (c. 1735 – 1775), British violinist and composer
- John Collett (MP) (1798–1856), Irish Whig politician
- Joseph Collett (1673–1725), British East India Company administrator, Governor of Bencoolen and President of Madras
- Laura Collett (born 1989), British equestrian who competes in eventing
- Lorraine Collett (1892–1983), American model, the "Sun-Maid girl"
- Lucy Collett (born 1989), British glamour model
- Mark Collett (born 1980), British political activist
- Nathan Collett, Kenyan filmmaker
- Ritter Collett (1921–2001), American sports editor and columnist
- Susan Collett (born 1961), Canadian artist
- Toni Collett (born 1972), birth name of Australian actress Toni Collette
- Wayne Collett (1945–2010), American runner
- William Collett (1839–1904), English cricketer
- William Rickford Collett (1810–1882), British mine owner and politician

Given name:

- Collett Leventhorpe (1815–1889), Confederate brigadier general in the American Civil War
- Collett E. Woolman (1889–1966), one of the four founders of Delta Air Lines
