= Foursome =

Foursome may refer to:

- Foursomes, a type of golf match
- Foursome (group sex), group sex involving four people
- Foursome (2006 TV series), an American adult reality dating series on Playboy TV
- Foursome (2016 TV series), an American romantic comedy web series
- The Foursome, a 2006 American/Canadian comedy film
- Foursome of Nine Dragon Island, fictional characters in the ancient Chinese novel Investiture of the Gods
- Wild Things: Foursome, the fourth film in the Wild Things franchise
