= List of Hoshin Engi chapters =

First tankōbon volume cover, released by Shueisha on November 1, 1996

The chapters of the Japanese manga series Hoshin Engi were written and illustrated by Ryu Fujisaki, and serialized in Weekly Shōnen Jump 1996 to 2000. Shueisha collected the individual chapters in 23 tankōbon volumes, with the first released on November 1, 1996 and volume 23 released on December 22, 2000. Shueisha later re-released the series in 18 kanzenban volumes, with the first volume released on July 4, 2005 and volume 18 released on April 4, 2006. The series is based on the ancient Chinese novel Investiture of the Gods, and as such follows Chinese mythology and history, focusing on the last members of the Shang dynasty and the plot to overthrow them.

Viz Media announced at Comic-Con 2006 that they had acquired the rights to translate Hoshin Engi into English and distribute it in North America. Viz released volume 1 on June 5, 2007, and finished releasing the series in 2011 (see below). The series has also been licensed in French by Glénat, in German by Egmont Manga & Anime, in Dutch by Glénat Benelux, and in Chinese in Taiwan by Tong Li Publishing.

Hoshin Engi has been adapted into a 26-episode anime television series titled Soul Hunter by the Japanese animation studio Studio Deen. The TV series, which was directed by Junji Nishimura, aired on TV Tokyo from July 3 to December 25, 1999. Hoshin Engi has also had several other adaptations, including a video game for the Game Boy Advance and WonderSwan, and several audio dramas released in 2005.

== Volume list ==
No.	Title	Original release date	English release date
01	Beginnings (封(ほう)神(しん)計画(プロジェクト)発(はつ)動(どう), Hōshin Purojekuto Hatsudō; The Apotheosis Project Initiates)	November 1, 1996; 4-08-872141-1	June 5, 2007; 978-1-4215-1362-1
001. "The Hoshin List" (封(ほう)神(しん)の書(リスト), Hōshin no Risuto; The Apotheosis List); 002. "The First Hoshin" (最初の封神, Saisho no Hōshin; The First Apotheosis); 003. "The Horaku" (妲己ちゃん 炮烙を造る, Dakki-chan Hōraku o Tsukuru; Daji-chan Devises the Paolao); 004. "Okijin" (石琵琶の妖怪, Ishibiwa no Yōkai; The Stone Pipa Yaoguai); 005. "No Allies" (宮中孤軍, Kyūchū Kogun; All Alone in the Palace); 006. "Temptation Jutsu" (誘惑の術(テンプテーション), Tenputēshon; Temptation); 007. "The Taibon" (妲己ちゃん 蠆盆を造る, Dakki-chan Taibon o Tsukuru; Daji-chan Devises the Chaipen)
02	Changes (始まりの終わり, Hajimari no Owari; The End of the Beginning)	January 10, 1997; 4-08-872142-X	August 7, 2007; 978-1-4215-1363-8
008. "The End of the Beginning" (序章(プロローグ)の終わり(エピローグ), Purorōgu no Epirōgu; The Epilogue of the Prologue); 009. "Nataku!" (宝(パオ)貝(ペエ)人(にん)間(げん)・哪(な)吒(たく)登(とう)場(じょう)‼, Paopē Ningen Nataku Tōjō‼; Enter Nezha, the Human Relic); 010. "The Birth of Nataku" (哪吒・出生の秘密, Nataku Shussei no Himitsu; The Secret of Nezha's Birth); 011. "Taikobo vs. Nataku!" (太公望VS哪吒・空中大決戦‼, Taikōbō bāsasu Nataku Kūchū Daikessen‼; Taigongwang vs. Nezha: Midair Showdown‼); 012. "The End of Nataku's Tale" (哪吒編・まとめ, Nataku-hen Matome; The End of Nezha's Tale); 013. "Yozen!" (玉泉山金霞洞玉鼎真人門下・楊戩登場‼, Gyokusen-san Kinka-dō Gyokutei Shinjin Monka Yō Zen Tōjō‼; Enter Yang Jian, Follower of Yuding Zhenren from Jinxia Cave, Mount Yuquan‼); 014. "Yozen's Test" (楊戩のテスト, Yō Zen no Tesuto; Yang Jian's Test); 015. "The End of the Test" (TEST・終了, Tesuto Shūryō); 016. "Dakki's Banquet" (妲己ちゃん酒池肉林をする, Dakki-chan Shuchi Nikurin o Suru; Daji-chan Does a Banquet); Character Encyclopedia!
03	Precogs (未来視たちの弁証法, Miraishi-tachi no Benshōhō; Dialectic of the Precognitives)	April 4, 1997; 4-08-872143-8	October 2, 2007; 978-1-4215-1364-5
017. "The Brotherhood of the Sky" (空の兄弟, Sora no Kyōdai); 018. "Taikobo's New Hairdo" (太公望・アフロになる, Taikōbō Afuro ni Naru; Taigongwang Gets an Afro); 019. "Taikobo's Advantage" (太公望ドーピングをする, Taikōbō Dōpingu o Suru; Taigongwang Does Doping); 020. "The Two Princes, Part 1" (太子二人, Taishi Futari; The Two Crown Princes); 021. "The Two Princes, Part 2" (太子二人II, Taishi Futari Tsū; The Two Crown Princes II); 022. "The Two Princes, Part 3" (太子二人III, Taishi Futari Surī; The Two Crown Princes III); 023. "Dialectic of the Precogs, Part 1" (未来視たちのディアレクティーク㊤, Miraishi-tachi no Diarekutīku Jō; Dialectic of the Precognitives (First Part)); 024. "Dialectic of the Precogs, Part 2" (未来視たちのディアレクティーク㊦, Miraishi-tachi no Diarekutīku Ge; Dialectic of the Precognitives (Last Part)); Interlude 1. Dokoson Goes Girl-Hunting (土行孫ナンパをする, Dokōson Nanpa o Suru; Tuxingsun Goes Picking up Dates); Character Encyclopedia! Part 2
04	Rebels (武成王造反, Busei Ō Zōhan; The Rebels for Prince Wucheng)	June 4, 1997; 4-08-872144-6	December 4, 2007; 978-1-4215-1365-2
025. "Dakki and Kibi's Three-Minute Cooking" (妲己・喜媚の3分間クッキング, Dakki Kibi no Sanpunkan Kukkingu; Daji and Ximei's 3-Minute Cooking); 026. "Bunchu vs. Dakki" (聞仲vs.妲己の構図, Bun Chū bāsasu Dakki no Kōzu; Wen Zhong vs. Daji's Composition); 027. "Taikobo's Disciple" (太公望の弟子, Taikōbō no Deshi; Taigongwang's Disciple); 028. "Taikobo and Sho Ki" (太公望と姫昌, Taikōbō to Ki Shō; Taigongwang and Ji Chang); 029. "The Buseio Rebels, Part 1 - Kashi and Koshi" (武成王造反①—賈氏と黄氏—, Busei Ō Zōhan ① —Ka Shi to Kō Shi—; The Rebels for Prince Wucheng ①: Jia Shi and Huang Shi); 030. "The Buseio Rebels, Part 2 - The Power of King Chu" (武成王造反②—紂王の力—, Busei Ō Zōhan ② —Chū Ō no Chikara—; The Rebels for Prince Wucheng ②: King Zhou's Power); 031. "The Buseio Rebels, Part 3 - Tenka Arrives" (武成王造反③—天化登場—, Busei Ō Zōhan ③ —Tenka Tōjō—; The Rebels for Prince Wucheng ③: Enter Tianhua); 032. "The Buseio Rebels, Part 4 - Taikobo Joins the Clan" (武成王造反④—太公望の合流—, Busei Ō Zōhan ④ —Taikōbō no Gōryū—; The Rebels for Prince Wucheng ④: Taigongwuang Joins the Force); 033. "The Buseio Rebels, Part 5 - Nataku Flies!" (武成王造反⑤—哪吒・発進!!!—, Busei Ō Zōhan ⑤ —Nataku Hasshin!!!—; The Rebels for Prince Wucheng ⑤: Nezha Takes off!); Character Encyclopedia! Part 3
05	Comrades (九竜島の四聖, The Four Sages of Jiulong Island)	August 4, 1997; 4-08-872145-4	February 5, 2008; 978-1-4215-1545-8
034. "The Buseio Rebels, Part 6 - The Paope of Kingo" (武(ぶ)成(せい)王(おう)造(ぞう)反(はん)⑥—金(きん)鰲(ごう)の宝(パオ)貝(ペエ)—, Busei Ō Zōhan ⑥ —Kingō no Paopē—; The Rebels for Prince Wucheng ⑥: The Relic of Jin'ao); 035. "The Buseio Rebels, Part 7 - Nataku Joins the Party" (武成王造反⑦—哪吒の合流—, Busei Ō Zōhan ⑦ —Nataku no Gōryū—; The Rebels for Prince Wucheng ⑦: Nezha Joins the Force); 036. "The Shisei of Kuryu Island, Part 1 - Doubting Taikobo's Strength" (九竜島の四聖①—太公望弱虫疑惑—, Kuryū-tō no Shisei ① —Taikōbō Yowamushi Giwaku—; The Four Sages of Jiulong Island ①: Doubts about Taigongwang's Capability); 037. "The Shisei of Kuryu Island, Part 2 - The Shisei's Past" (九竜島の四聖②—四聖の過去—, Kuryū-tō no Shisei ② —Shisei no Kako—; The Four Sages of Jiulong Island ②: The Four Sages' Past); 038. "The Shisei of Kuryu Island, Part 3 - The Drinking Match" (九竜島の四聖③—飲みまくり大会—, Kuryū-tō no Shisei ③ —Nomimakuri Taikai—; The Four Sages of Jiulong Island ③: The Drinking Tournament); 049. "The Shisei of Kuryu Island, Part 4 - The Shisei go to Seiki" (九竜島の四聖④—四聖・西岐へ—, Kuryū-tō no Shisei ④ —Shisei Seiki e—; The Four Sages of Jiulong Island ④: The Four Sages Head for Xiqi); 040. "The Shisei of Kuryu Island, Part 5 - The Genius Yozen" (九竜島の四聖⑤—天才・楊戩—, Kuryū-tō no Shisei ⑤ —Tensai Yō Zen—; The Four Sages of Jiulong Island ⑤: The Genius Yang Jian); 041. "The Shikei of Kuryu Island, Part 6 - Nataku the Crusher" (九竜島の四聖⑥—クラッシャー哪吒—, Kuryū-tō no Shisei ⑥ —Kurasshā Nataku—; The Four Sages of Jiulong Island ⑥: The Crusher: Nezha); 042. "The Shikei of Kuryu Island, Part 7 - Taikobo Gives Tenka Ko the Karyuhyo" (九竜島の四聖⑦—太公望・黄天化に火竜鏢をわたす—, Kuryū-tō no Shisei ⑦ —Taikōbō Kō Tenka o Karyūhyō o Watasu—; The Four Sages of Jiulong Island ⑦: Taigongwang Gives Huang Tianhua the Hualongbiao)
06	The Taishi of Yin (殷の太師)	October 3, 1997; 4-08-872146-2	April 1, 2008; 978-1-4215-1627-1
043. "Together With the Night" (夜と共に..., Yoru to Tomo ni...); 044. "The Taishi of Yin" (殷の太師, In no Taishi); 045. "Two Alternatives" (二つの道, Futatsu no Michi); 046. "Past, Present and Future, Part 1 - Dakki, the Bad Girl" (それぞれの現在・過去・未来シリーズ①—THE悪役♡妲己ちゃん—, Sorezore no Genzai Kako Mirai Shirīzu ① —Za Akuyaku♡Dakki-chan—; Present, Past and Future Series ①: Daji-chan ♡ the Villain); 047. "Past, Present and Future, Part 2 - Nataku Hunts for Paope" (それぞれの現(げん)在(ざい)・過(か)去(こ)・未(み)来(らい)シリーズ②—哪(な)吒(たく)の宝(パオ)貝(ペエ)狩(が)りと元(げん)始(し)天(てん)尊(そん)の○×△—, Sorezore no Genzai Kako Mirai Shirīzu ② —Nataku no Paopē-gari to Genshi Tenson no ○×△—; Present, Past and Future Series ②: Nezha's Relic Hunt and the Primordial Skyliege's ○×△—); 048. "Past, Present and Future, Part 3 - Iron Chef! Hiko Ko versus Nan Kyukatsu" (それぞれの現在・過去・未来シリーズ③—BATTLE COOKING‼黄飛虎V.S.南宮适—, Sorezore no Genzai Kako Mirai Shirīzu ③ —Batoru Kukkingu‼ Kō Hiko bāsasu Nankyū Katsu—; Present, Past and Future Series ③: Battle Cooking‼ Huang Feihu vs. Nangong Kuo); 049. "Past, Present and Future, Part 4 - The Hoshin Project, Taikobo-style and the Foolish Prince Hatsu" (それぞれの現在・過去・未来シリーズ④—太公望なりの封神計画とバカ殿 はっちゃん—, Sorezore no Genzai Kako Mirai Shirīzu ④ —Taikōbō no Hōshin Keikaku to Bakatono Hatchan—; Present, Past and Future Series ④: Taigongwang-esque Apotheosis Project and Fa-chan the Foolish Prince); 050. "Past, Present and Future, Part 5 - The Elephant Race" (それぞれの現在・過去・未来シリーズ⑤—像レース—, Sorezore no Genzai Kako Mirai Shirīzu ⑤ —Zō Rēsu—; Present, Past and Future Series ⑤: The Elephant Race); 051. "Past, Present and Future, Part 6 - The Bond with the Lineage" (それぞれの現在・過去・未来シリーズ⑥—継がれし血脈たちとの絆—, Sorezore no Genzai Kako Mirai Shirīzu ⑥ —Tsugareshi Ketsumyaku-tachi to no Kizuna—; Present, Past and Future Series ⑥: The Bond with the Bloodline); Secret Characters Encyclopedia! Part 4; Secret Characters Encyclopedia! Part 5
07	The Curtain Falls (老賢人に幕は降り, Rōkenjin ni Maku wa Ori; The Curtain Falls for the Virtuous Old Man)	December 4, 1997; 4-08-872147-0	June 3, 2008; 978-1-4215-1628-8
052. "Supushan Becomes Bird Feed" (四不象(スープーシャン)・鳥(とり)のエサとなる, Sūpūshan Tori no Esa to Naru; Sibuxiang Turns into Bird Feed); 053. "The Curtain Falls, Part 1" (老賢人に幕は降り㊤, Rōkenjin ni Maku wa Ori Jō; The Curtain Falls for the Virtuous Old Man (First Part)); 054. "The Curtain Falls, Part 2" (老賢人に幕は降り㊦, Rōkenjin ni Maku wa Ori Ge; The Curtain Falls for the Virtuous Old Man (Last Part)); 055. "The Maka Yonsho, Part 1 - The End of the Prologue and the Beginning of the True Story" (魔家四将①—革命幼年期の終わりと物語枢軸のはじまり—, Maka Yonshō ① —Kakumei Yōnenki no Owari to Monogatari Sūjiku no Hajimari—; The Four Demonic Commanders ①: The End of the Dawn of the Revolution and the Beginning of the Pivotal Story); 056. "The Maka Yonsho, Part 2 - The Beginning of the Nightmare" (魔家四将②—悪夢のはじまり—, Maka Yonshō ② —Akumu no Hajimari—; The Four Demonic Commanders ②: The Beginning of the Nightmare); 057. "The Maka Yonsho, Part 3 - Captured, Escaped, and Regrouped" (魔家四将③—捕われて脱出して集結する回—, Maka Yonshō ③ —Torawarete Dasshutsu Shite Shūketsu Suru Kai—; The Four Demonic Commanders ③: Captured, Escapes and Regroups); 058. "The Maka Yonsho, Part 4 - Attack! Paope Human! The End of the Kakoten?!" (魔(ま)家(か)四(よん)将(しょう)④—特(とっ)攻(こう)‼宝(パオ)貝(ペエ)人(にん)間(げん)!!!AND(アンド)花(か)狐(こ)貂(てん)の最(さい)後(ご)‼?—, Maka Yonshō ④ —Tokkō‼ Paopē Ningen!!! Ando Kakoten no Saigo‼?—; The Four Demonic Commanders ④: Suicide Attack‼ Human Relic!!! And the End of Huahudiao‼?); 059. "The Maka Yonsho, Part 5 - A Herd of Kakoten!" (魔家四将⑤———と思ったら花狐貂はまだまだ沢山いた‼—, Maka Yonshō ⑤ ———to Omottara Kakoten wa Madamada Takusan Ita‼—; The Four Demonic Commanders ⑤: ...There Are Still an Awful Lot of Huahudiaos‼); 060. "The Maka Yonsho, Part 6 - Raishinshi, the Oak Tree" (魔家四将⑥—雷震子・カシの木と言われる—, Maka Yonshō ⑥ —Raishinshi Kashi no Ki to Iwareru—; The Four Demonic Commanders ⑥: Leizhenzi, Who's Known as the Oak Tree)
08	The Revolution (殷周易姓革命, In-Shū Ekisei Kakumei; The Heavenly Yin-Zhou Revolution)	March 4, 1998; 4-08-872529-8	August 5, 2008; 978-1-4215-1629-5
061. "The Maka Yonsho, Part 7 - Tenka Returns!" (魔家四将⑦—天化再登場!!!—, Maka Yonshō ⑦ —Tenka Saitōjō!!!—; The Four Demonic Commanders ⑦: Reenter Tianhua!!!); 062. "The Maka Yonsho, Part 8 - Tenka Rejoins the Battle!" (魔家四将⑧—天化再戦!!!—, Maka Yonshō ⑧ —Tenka Saisen!!!—; The Four Demonic Commanders ⑧: Tianhua Rejoins the Battle!!!); 063. "The Maka Yonsho, Part 9 - The Original Form of the Maka Yonsho" (魔家四将⑨—四体合体☆魔家四将・原形ヴァージョン‼‼—, Maka Yonshō ⑨ —Yontai Gattai☆Maka Yonshō Genkei Vājon‼‼—; The Four Demonic Commanders ⑨: Four as One ☆ The Four Demonic Commanders: Original Version‼‼); 064. "The Maka Yonsho, Part 10 - The Maka Yonsho Are Sent to the Hoshindai" (魔家四将⑩—魔家四将・封神台へ—, Maka Yonshō ⑩ —Maka Yonshō Hōshindai e—; The Four Demonic Commanders ⑩: The Four Demonic Commanders Are Sent to the Ground of Apotheosis); 065. "Mission: Impossible!" (SPY大作戦!!!, Supai Daisakusen!!!; Huge Spy Operation!!!); 066. "The Birds" (鳥, Tori); 067. "The Revolution Begins!" (殷周易姓革命START!, In-Shū Ekisei Kakumei Sutāto!; The Heavenly Yin-Zhou Revolution Begins!); 068. "The Inside of Kingo Island" (金鰲島内部～蟬玉のダディ, Kingō-tō Naibu ~ Sengyoku no Dadi; Inside Jin'ao Island ~ Chanyu's Daddy); 069. "Dokoson Sneaks in at Night" (土行孫・夜ばいをする, Dokōson Yobai o Suru; Tuxingsun Sneaks in at Night)
09	The Princes' Choice (太子の選択, Taishi no Sentaku; The Crown Princes' Choice)	May 1, 1998; 4-08-872552-2	October 7, 2008; 978-1-4215-1630-1
070. "Toh Kyuko, Sengyoku and Ryushuko Pledge Allegiance to Zhou" (鄧九公・蟬玉・竜鬚虎、周に帰順する, Tō Kyū-kō Sengyoku Ryū Shuko Shū ni Kijun Suru; Duke Deng IX, Chanyu and Long Xuhu Pledge Allegiance to Zhou); 071. "The Lonely Warrior" (孤高の戦士, Kokō no Senshi; The Lone Warrior); 072. "Virus" (virus, Uirusu); 073. "The Battle for Ryogaku's Blood!" (呂岳の血液争奪戦‼, Ryo Gaku no Ketsueki Sōdatsusen‼; The Struggle for Lu Yue's Blood); 074. "The So Family's State of Affairs" (蘇護親子の家庭の事情, So Go Oyako no Katei no Jijō; Su Hu's Family's State of Affairs); 075. "Nataku's Rebellious Phase and His Growth" (不良息子・哪吒の反抗期と成長, Furyō Musuko Nataku no Hankōki to Seichō; The Rebellious Phase and Growth of Nezha, a Delinquent Son); 076. "The Two Princes Return from Kongrong" (二太子・崑崙を下山する, Nitaishi Konron o Gezan Suru; The Two Crown Princes Returns from Kunlun); 077. "The Princes' Choice, Part 1" (太子の選択・その1, Taishi no Sentaku Sono 1; The Crown Princes' Choice, Part 1); 078. "The Princes' Choice, Part 2" (太子の選択・その2, Taishi no Sentaku Sono 2; The Crown Princes' Choice, Part 2); 079. "The Princes' Choice, Part 3" (太子の選択・その3, Taishi no Sentaku Sono 3; The Crown Princes' Choice, Part 3); "Hoshin Engi" Secret Characters Encyclopedia! Part 8: He's the Hero! Can He Do It When It Counts?! Taikobo Operations Encyclopedia!; "Hoshin Engi" Secret Characters Encyclopedia! Part 9: Forecast! The Great Zhou vs. Yin War!; The Sheer Precipice, Where Is It Now? 12; Hoshin Engi Data Files
10	Conquering Chokomei, Part 1 (趙公明攻略・上, Chō Kōmei Kōryaku Jō; Conquering Zhao Gongming: First Part)	July 3, 1998; 4-08-872575-1	December 2, 2008; 978-1-4215-1631-8
080. "The Princes' Choice, Part 4" (太子の選択・その4, Taishi no Sentaku Sono 4; The Crown Princes' Choice, Part 4); 081. "The Princes' Choice, Part 5" (太子の選択・その5, Taishi no Sentaku Sono 5; The Crown Princes' Choice, Part 5); 082. "The Princes' Choice, Part 6 - Chokomei Packs Up" (太子の選択・その6～趙公明の荷造り, Taishi no Sentaku Sono 6 ~ Chō Kōmei no Nizukuri; The Crown Princes' Choice, Part 6 ~ Zhao Gongming Packs up); 083. "The Giant Chokomei" (巨大趙公明, Kyodai Chō Kōmei; Giant Zhao Gongming); 084. "The Luxury Liner Queen Joker II" (豪華客船クイーン・ジョーカーII世号, Gōka Kyakusen Kuīn Jōkā Niseigō; The Luxury Line Queen Joker Mk. II); 085. "Conquering Chokomei, Part 1 - Yozen in Big Trouble" (趙公明攻略I—楊戩のくせに大ピンチ—, Chō Kōmei Kōryaku Wan —Yō Zen no Kuse ni Dai-Pinchi—; Conquering Zhao Gongming I: Yang Jian in Big Trouble); 086. "Conquering Chokomei, Part 2 - Mind Control" (趙公明攻略II—BRAIN CONTROL—, Chō Kōmei Kōryaku Tsū —Burein Kontorōru—; Conquering Zhao Gongming II: Brain Control); 087. "Conquering Chokomei, Part 3 - Kingo's Paope Human" (趙(ちょう)公(こう)明(めい)攻(こう)略(りゃく)III(スリー)—金(きん)鰲(ごう)の宝(パオ)貝(ペエ)人(にん)間(げん)—, Chō Kōmei Kōryaku Surī —Kingō no Paopē Ningen—; Conquering Zhao Gongming III: The Human Relic of Jin'ao); 088. "Conquering Chokomei, Part 4 - Proof of Humanity, Part 1" (趙公明攻略IV—人間の証明㊤—, Chō Kōmei Kōryaku Fō —Ningen no Shōmei Jō—; Conquering Zhao Gongming IV: Proof of Humanity (First Part)); Hack Writing VIII–IX; The Sheer Precipice, Where Is It Now? 13; Hoshin Engi Data Files
11	Conquering Chokomei, Part 2 (趙公明攻略・中, Chō Kōmei Kōryaku Chū; Conquering Zhao Gongming: Middle Part)	September 2, 1998; 4-08-872602-2	February 3, 2009; 978-1-4215-2400-9
089. "Conquering Chokomei, Part 5 - Proof of Humanity, Part 2" (趙公明攻略V—人間の証明㊦—, Chō Kōmei Kōryaku Faibu —Ningen no Shōmei Ge—; Conquering Zhao Gongming V: Proof of Humanity (Last Part)); 090. "Conquering Chokomei, Part 6 - Sengoku Gets Stalked" (趙公明攻略VI—蟬玉・ストーカー被害—, Chō Kōmei Kōryaku Shikkusu —Sengyoku Sutōkā Higai—; Conquering Zhao Gongming VI: Chanyu Gets Stalked); 091. "Conquering Chokomei, Part 7 - Sennyo of Water, Part 1" (趙公明攻略VII—水の仙女㊤—, Chō Kōmei Kōryaku Sebun —Mizu no Sennyo Jō—; Conquering Zhao Gongming VII: Xiannu of Water (First Part)); 092. "Conquering Chokomei, Part 8 - Sennyo of Water, Part 2" (趙公明攻略VIII—水の仙女㊦—, Chō Kōmei Kōryaku Eito —Mizu no Sennyo Ge—; Conquering Zhao Gongming VIII: Xiannu of Water (Last Part)); 093. "Conquering Chokomei, Part 9 - The Labyrinth, Part 1" (趙(ちょう)公(こう)明(めい)攻(こう)略(りゃく)IX(ナイン)—迷宮(ラビリンス)—, Chō Kōmei Kōryaku Nain —Rabirinsu—; Conquering Zhao Gongming IX: The Labyrinth); 094. "Conquering Chokomei, Part 10 - The Labyrinth, Part 2" (趙(ちょう)公(こう)明(めい)攻(こう)略(りゃく)X(テン)—迷宮(ラビリンス)2—, Chō Kōmei Kōryaku Ten —Rabirinsu 2—; Conquering Zhao Gongming X: The Labyrinth 2); 095. "Conquering Chokomei, Part 11 - The Labyrinth, Part 3" (趙(ちょう)公(こう)明(めい)攻(こう)略(りゃく)XI(イレブン)—迷宮(ラビリンス)3—, Chō Kōmei Kōryaku Irebun —Rabirinsu 3—; Conquering Zhao Gongming XI: The Labyrinth 3); 096. "Conquering Chokomei, Part 12 - The Top Floor" (趙公明攻略XII—最上階—, Chō Kōmei Kōryaku Tuerubu —Saijōkai—; Conquering Zhao Gongming XII: The Top Floor); 097. "Conquering Chokomei, Part 13 - The Terror of the Sexy Unsho Sisters!" (趙公明攻略XIII—戦慄のセクシータレント雲霄三姉妹の恐怖!!!—, Chō Kōmei Kōryaku Sātīn —Senritsu no Sekushī Tarento Unshō Sanshimai no Kyōfu!!!—; Conquering Zhao Gongming XIII: The Terror of the Terrifying Sexy Talent Yunxiao Sisters!!!); The Sheer Precipice, Where Is It Now? 14; Hoshin Engi Data Files
12	Conquering Chokomei, Part 3 (趙公明攻略・下, Chō Kōmei Kōryaku Ge; Conquering Zhao Gongming: Last Part)	November 4, 1998; 4-08-872627-8	April 7, 2009; 978-1-4215-2401-6
098. "Conquering Chokomei, Part 14 - The Angelic Unsho Sisters!" (趙公明攻略XIV—魔法のスウィートエンジェル雲♡霄♡三姉妹‼—, Chō Kōmei Kōryaku Fōtīn —Mahō no Suwīto Enjeru Un♡shō♡Sanshimai‼—; Conquering Zhao Gongming XIV: The Yun♡xiao♡Sisters, the Magical Sweet Angels); 099. "Medium-boss Battle, Part 1 - Black" (中BOSS BATTLE①—BLACK—, Chū-Bosu Batoru ① —Burakku—; Medium-Boss Battle ①: Black); 100. "Medium-boss Battle, Part 2 - Kinkosen: Chokomei's Rainbow Version" (中BOSS BATTLE②—金蛟剪趙公明レインボーバージョン—, Chū-Bosu Batoru ② —Kinkōsen Chō Kōmei Reinbō Bājon—; Medium-Boss Battle ②: Golden Serpent Shears Zhao Gongming: Rainbow Version); 101. "Medium-boss Battle, Part 3 - A Bad End" (中BOSS BATTLE③—BAD END—, Chū-Bosu Batoru ③ —Baddo Endo—; Medium-Boss Battle ③: Bad End); 102. "Medium-boss Battle, Part 4 - Stop the Ennui Academy at All Costs!" (中BOSS BATTLE④—アンニュイ学園を断固阻止せよ！—, Chū-Bosu Batoru ④ —Annyui Gakuen o Danko Soshi Seyo!—; Medium-Boss Battle ④: Hold Your Positions Fast Against the Ennui Academy!); 103. "Medium-boss Battle, Part 5 - The Supu Valley" (中BOSS BATTLE⑤—スープー谷—, Chū-Bosu Batoru ⑤ —Sūpū-tani—; Medium-Boss Battle ⑤: Sibu Valley); 104. "Medium-boss Battle, Part 6 - Flower" (中BOSS BATTLE⑥—花—, Chū-Bosu Batoru ⑥ —Hana—; Medium-Boss Battle ⑥: Flower); 105. "Medium-boss Battle, Part 7 - The Mesosphere" (中BOSS BATTLE⑦—中間圏—, Chū-Bosu Batoru ⑦ —Chūkanken—; Medium-Boss Battle ⑦: The Mesosphere); 106. "Medium-boss Battle, Part 8 - The Fall of the Aristocrat" (中BOSS BATTLE⑧—貴族没落—, Chū-Bosu Batoru ⑧ —Kizoku Botsuraku—; Medium-Boss Battle ⑧: The Fall of the Aristocrat); Second Character popularity Poll!; "Hoshin Engi" Secret Character Encyclopedia: The Real Causes of the Conflict!; The Sheer Precipice, Where Is It Now? Side Story: The Battle of Persepolis!; Hack Writing X–XI; Hoshin Engi Data Files
13	The Sennin World War (仙界大戦, Senkai Taisen; The Xian-world War)	January 8, 1999; 4-08-872654-5	June 2, 2009; 978-1-4215-2402-3
107. "Tsuten Kyoshu, Part 1" (通天教主ONE, Tsūten Kyōshu Wan; The Throughsky Pontiff: One); 108. "Tsuten Kyoshu, Part 2" (通天教主TWO, Tsūten Kyōshu Tsū; The Throughsky Pontiff: Two); 109. "The Sennin World War, Part 1 - Kingo Island Invades Mount Kongrong!" (仙界大戦一—まさかの金鰲島侵攻に対し崑崙山・迎撃体制をとれ!!!—, Senkai Taisen One —Masaka no Kingō-tō Shinkō ni Tai-shi Konron-san Geigeki Taisei o Tore!!!—; The Xian-world War 1: Surprise Invasion of Jin'ao Island and the Kunlun Mountains' Counterattack!!!); 110. "The Sennin World War, Part 2 - Bunchu's Fierce Attack! Yozen's Shield!" (仙界大戦二—熾烈！聞仲の猛攻‼楊戩の壁!!!—, Senkai Taisen Ni —Shiretsu! Bun Chū no Mōkō! Yō Zen no Kabe!!!—; The Xian-world War Two: Wen Zhong's Fierce Attack‼ Yang Jian's Barrier!!!); 111. "The Sennin World War, Part 3 - Bunchu Attacks Mercilessly! Kingo Island's Principle Gun, Tsutenho" (仙界大戦三—容赦なき聞仲の猛攻！金鰲島の主砲『通天砲』の前に崑崙山史上最大のピンチ!!!—, Senkai Taisen San —Yōshanaki Bun Chū no Mōkō! Kingō-tō no Shuhō "Tsūtenhō" no Mae ni Konron-san Shijō Saidai no Pinchi!!!—; The Xian-world War Three: Wen Zhong's Merciless Attack! The Kunlun Mountains in the Tightest Spot Yet, Facing Jin'ao Island's Main Cannon, the "Throughsky Cannon"); 112. "The Sennin World War, Part 4 - The Genius Doshi" (仙界大戦四—天才道士—, Senkai Taisen Yon —Tensai Dōshi—; The Xian-world War Four: The Genius Daoshi); 113. "The Sennin World War, Part 5 - The Genius Doshi, Part 2" (仙界大戦五—天才道士2—, Senkai Taisen Go —Tensai Dōshi 2—; The Xian-world War Five: The Genius Daoshi 2); 114. "The Sennin World War, Part 6 - Yozen's Monster Form" (仙界大戦六—楊戩の半妖態—, Senkai Taisen Roku —Yō Zen no Han'yōtai—; The Xian-world War Six: Yangjian's Half-Yao Ability); 115. "The Sennin World War, Part 7 - The Mission to Rescue Yozen and Otenkun's Trap" (仙界大戦七—楊戩救出作戦と王天君の罠—, Senkai Taisen Nana —Yō Zen Kyūshutsu Sakusen to Ō Tenkun no Wana—; The Xian-world War Seven: The Mission to Rescue Yang Jian and Skylord Wang's Trap); In Commemoration of the 100th Chapter: A Poster/Title Page; The Sheer Precipice, Where Is It Now? 15; Hoshin Engi Data Files
14	The Battle of the Juzetsujin, Part 1 (十絶陣の戦い・上, Jūzetsujin no Tatakai Jō; The Battle of the Ten Juezhen: First Part)	April 2, 1999; 4-08-872698-7	August 4, 2009; 978-1-4215-2403-0
116. "The Battle of the Juzetsujin "Kaketsujin" - The Toy World, Part 1" (十絶陣の戦い・『化血陣』・オモチャの世界①, Jūzetsujin no Tatakai "Kaketsujin" Omocha no Sekai ①; The Battle of the Ten Juezhen: "Huaxuezhen" - The Toy World ①); 117. "The Battle of the Juzetsujin "Kaketsujin" - The Toy World, Part 2" (十絶陣の戦い・『化血陣』・オモチャの世界②, Jūzetsujin no Tatakai "Kaketsujin" Omocha no Sekai ②; The Battle of the Ten Juezhen: "Huaxuezhen" - The Toy World ②); 118. "The Battle of the Juzetsujin "Kaketsujin" - Concentration" (十絶陣の戦い・『化血陣』・神経衰弱, Jūzetsujin no Tatakai "Kaketsujin" Shinkei Suijaku; The Battle of the Ten Juezhen: "Huaxuezhen" - Concentration); 119. "The Battle of the Juzetsujin "Kosuijin" - Incomprehensible" (十絶陣の戦い・『紅水陣』・理解不理解, Jūzetsujin no Tatakai "Kōsuijin" Rikai Furikai; The Battle of the Ten Juezhen: "Hongshuizhen" - Incomprehensible); 120. "The Battle of the Juzetsujin "Kosuijin" - The Rain of Blood" (十絶陣の戦い・『紅水陣』・血の雨, Jūzetsujin no Tatakai "Kōsuijin" Chi no Ame; The Battle of the Ten Juezhen: "Hongshuizhen" - Blood Rain); 121. "The Battle of the Juzetsujin "Kosuijin" - Gyokutei Shinjin's Soul Is Sent to the Hoshindai" (十絶陣の戦い・『紅水陣』・玉鼎真人の魂魄・封神台へ, Jūzetsujin no Tatakai "Kōsuijin" Gyokutei Shinjin no Konpaku Hōshindai e; The Battle of the Ten Juezhen: "Hongshuizhen" - Yuding Zhenren's Soul, Sent to the Ground of Apotheosis); 122. "The Battle of the Juzetsujin "Fukojin" - Into the Tornado" (十絶陣の戦い・『風吼陣』・INTO THE TORNADO, Jūzetsujin no Tatakai "Fūkōjin" Intu za Torunēdo; The Battle of the Ten Juezhen: "Fenghouzhen" - Into the Tornado); 123. "The Battle of the Juzetsujin "Fukojin" - The Insect" (十絶陣の戦い・『風吼陣』・虫, Jūzetsujin no Tatakai "Fūkōjin" Mushi; The Battle of the Ten Juezhen: "Fenghouzhen" - The Bug); 124. "The Battle of the Juzetsujin "Kanpyojin" - New Romantic" (十絶陣の戦い・『寒氷陣』・ニューロマンティック, Jūzetsujin no Tatakai "Kanpyōjin" Nyū Romantikku; The Battle of the Ten Juezhen: "Hanbingzhen" - New Romantic); "Hoshin Engi" Secret Characters Encyclopedia, Part 11: The Sennin World War; The Sheer Precipice Where Is It Now? 16; hack Writing XII–XIII; Hoshin Engi Data Files
15	The Battle of the Juzetsujin, Part 2 (十絶陣の戦い・下, Jūzetsujin no Tatakai Ge; The Battle of the Ten Juezhen: Last Part)	June 3, 1999; 4-08-872723-1	October 6, 2009; 978-1-4215-2404-7
125. "The Battle of the Juzetsujin "Kanpyojin" - Quantum Force" (十絶陣の戦い・『寒氷陣』・量子力, Jūzetsujin no Tatakai "Kanpyōjin" Ryōshiryoku; The Battle of the Ten Juezhen: "Hanbingzhen" - Quantum Force); 126. "Parasitic Paope, Part 1 - Igo Arrives!" (寄(き)生(せい)宝(パオ)貝(ペエ)I(ワン)—韋(い)護(ご)登(とう)場(じょう)‼—, Kisei Paopē Wan —Igo Tōjō‼—; Parasitic Relic I: Enter Weihu‼); 127. "The Battle of the Juzetsujin "Kinkojin" & "Rakkonjin" - Nataku, Yozen, and Igo Join Forces!" (十絶陣の戦い・『金光陣+落魂陣』・哪吒・楊戩・韋護の合流‼, Jūzetsujin no Tatakai "Kinkōjin + Rakkonjin" Nataku Yō Zen Igo no Gōryū; The Battle of the Ten Juezhen: "Jinguangzhen + Luohunzhen" - Nezha, Yang Jian and Weihu Join Forces‼); 128. "The Battle of the Juzetsujin "Kinkojin" & "Rakkonjin" - A Doshi Who's Like an Old Fogey" (十絶陣の戦い・『金光陣+落魂陣』・オヤジくさい道士, Jūzetsujin no Tatakai "Kinkōjin + Rakkonjin" Oyaji-kusai Dōshi; The Battle of the Ten Juezhen: "Jinguangzhen + Luohunzhen" - A Stinky Daoshi Geezer); 129. "The Battle of the Juzetsujin "Kinkojin" & "Rakkonjin" - Shadow" (十絶陣の戦い・『金光陣+落魂陣』・SHADOW, Jūzetsujin no Tatakai "Kinkōjin + Rakkonjin" Shadō; The Battle of the Ten Juezhen: "Jinguangzhen + Luohunzhen" - Shadow); 130. "The Battle of the Juzetsujin "Kinkojin" & "Rakkonjin" - Light" (十絶陣の戦い・『金光陣+落魂陣』・光, Jūzetsujin no Tatakai "Kinkōjin + Rakkonjin" Hikari; The Battle of the Ten Juezhen: "Jinguangzhen + Luohunzhen" - Light); 131. "Tsuten Kyoshu, Part 3" (通天教主THREE, Tsūten Kyōshu Surī; The Throughsky Pontiff: Three); 132. "Tsuten Kyoshu, Part 4" (通天教主FOUR, Tsūten Kyōshu Fō; The Throughsky Pontiff: Four); 133. "Tsuten Kyoshu, Part 5" (通天教主FIVE, Tsūten Kyōshu Faibu; The Throughsky Pontiff: Five); Hack Writing XIV; What Is This Feature For? Foreign Edition of Hoshin Engi Looks Real Authentic.; The Sheer Precipice, Where Is It Now? 17; Hoshin Engi Data Files
16	Mortal Combat (死闘, Shitō)	August 4, 1999; 4-08-872746-0	December 1, 2009; 978-1-4215-2405-4
134. "Tsuten Kyoshu, Part 6" (通天教主SIX, Tsūten Kyōshu Shikkusu; The Throughsky Pontiff: Six); 135. "Mortal Combat, Part 1 - Supu Papa Arrives" (死闘一—スープーパパ現る—, Shitō Ichi —Sūpū Papa Arawaru—; Mortal Combat One: Sibu Papa Arrives); 136. "Mortal Combat, Part 2 - Fugen Shinjin" (死闘二—普賢真人—, Shitō Ni —Fugen Shinjin—; Mortal Combat Two: Puxian Zhenren); 137. "Mortal Combat, Part 3 - Fugen Shinjin, Part 2" (死闘三—普賢真人II—, Shitō San —Fugen Shinjin Tsū—; Mortal Combat Three: Puxian Zhenren II); 138. "Mortal Combat, Part 4 - Taikobo vs. Bunchu" (死闘四—太公望V.S.聞仲 Bクイック攻撃成功なるか⁉—, Shitō Yon —Taikōbō bāsasu Bun Chū Bī-Kuikku Kōgeki Seikō-naru ka⁉—; Mortal Combat Four: Taigongwang vs. Wen Zhong: B-Quick Attack Succeeds⁉); 139. "Mortal Combat, Part 5 - Kokukirin" (死闘五—黒麒麟—, Shitō Go —Kokukirin—; Mortal Combat Five: Black Qilin); 140. "Mortal Combat, Part 6 - When the Stars Fall" (死闘六—星降る時—, Shitō Roku —Hoshi Furu Toki—; Mortal Combat Six: When the Stars Fall); 141. "Mortal Combat, Part 7 - A Flash of Light, Silence and..." (死闘七—閃光・静寂・そして...—, Shitō Nana —Senkō Seijaku Soshite...—; Mortal Combat Seven: A Flash, Silence, and...); 142. "Mortal Combat, Part 8 - Eternal Bliss" (死闘八—永劫の幸福—, Shitō Hachi —Eigō no Kōfuku—; Mortal Combat Eight: Happy Ever After)
17	The Diverging Wind (風の分岐, Kaze no Bunki; The Divergence of the Wind)	November 4, 1999; 4-08-872783-5	February 2, 2010; 978-1-4215-2829-8
143. "Mortal Combat, Part 9 - Super Paope Bankohan" (死(し)闘(とう)九—スーパー宝(パオ)貝(ペエ)『盤(ばん)古(こ)幡(はん)』—, Shitō Kyū —Sūpā Paopē "Bankohan"—; Mortal Combat Nine: Super Relic "Pangu Banner"); 144. "Mortal Combat, Part 10 - Otenkun Treads on Genshi Tenson" (死闘十—元始天尊 王天君にグリグリされる—, Shitō Jū —Genshi Tenson Ō Tenkun ni Guriguri Sareru—; Mortal Combat Ten: The Primordial Skyliege Gets Tread by Skylord Wang); 145. "Mortal Combat, Part 11 - The Past and the Present" (死(し)闘(とう)十一—現(い)在(ま)かさなる過(か)去(こ)—, Shitō Jūichi —Ima Kasanaru Kako—; Mortal Combat Eleven: The Past Overlaps the Now); 146. "Mortal Combat, Part 12 - The Warrior Hero Is Sealed" (死闘十二—武雄封神—, Shitō Jūni —Buyū Hōshin—; Mortal Combat Twelve: Apotheosis of a Hero); 147. "The Diverging Wind, Part 1" (老(お)いたる象徴(しるし)と風(かぜ)の分(ぶん)岐(き)㊤(じょう), Oitaru Shirushi to Kaze no Bunki Jō; The Coming-of-Age Icon and the Divergence of the Wind (First Part)); 148. "The Diverging Wind, Part 2" (老(お)いたる象徴(しるし)と風(かぜ)の分(ぶん)岐(き)㊦(げ), Oitaru Shirushi to Kaze no Bunki Ge; The Coming-of-Age Icon and the Divergence of the Wind (Last Part)); 149. "The Adventure of Taijo Rokun, Part 1 - Return and Departure" (太上老君をめぐる冒険1—帰還そして旅立ち—, Taijō Rōkun o Meguru Bōken 1 —Kikan Soshite Tabidachi—; The Adventure of the Grand Elderlord 1: Return and Departure); 150. "The Adventure of Taijo Rokun, Part 2 - Togenkyo" (太上老君をめぐる冒険2—桃源郷—, Taijō Rōkun o Meguru Bōken 2 —Tōgenkyō—; The Adventure of the Grand Elderlord 2: Taoyuan Town); 151. "The Adventure of Taijo Rokun, Part 3 - The Wind Between the Clouds" (太上老君をめぐる冒険3—雲間に揺れて風立ち去りぬ—, Taijō Rōkun o Meguru Bōken 3 —Kumoma ni Yurete Kaze Tachisarinu—; The Adventure of the Grand Elderlord 3: The Wind That Doesn't Stop Drifting the Clouds)
18	The Adventure of Taijo Rokun (太上老君をめぐる冒険, Taijō Rōkun o Meguru Bōken; The Adventure of the Grand Elderlord)	February 2, 2000; 4-08-872820-3	April 6, 2010; 978-1-4215-2830-4
152. "The Adventure of Taijo Rokun, Part 4 - Taikobo Gets Macho" (太上老君をめぐる冒険4—太公望・筋肉質となる—, Taijō Rōkun o Meguru Bōken 4 —Taikōbō Kinnikushitsu to Naru—; The Adventure of the Grand Elderlord 4: Taigongwang Gets Buffed up); 153. "The Adventure of Taijo Rokun, Part 5 - Lao-Tzu" (太上老君をめぐる冒険5—老子—, Taijō Rōkun o Meguru Bōken 5 —Rōshi—; The Adventure of the Grand Elderlord 5: Laozi); 154. "The Adventure of Taijo Rokun, Part 6 - Sleep" (太上老君をめぐる冒険6—睡眠—, Taijō Rōkun o Meguru Bōken 6 —Suimin—; The Adventure of the Grand Elderlord 6: Sleep); 155. "The Adventure of Taijo Rokun, Part 7 - Taikobo Resorts to Extortion" (太上老君をめぐる冒険7—太公望カツアゲをする—, Taijō Rōkun o Meguru Bōken 7 —Taikōbō Katsuage o Suru—; The Adventure of the Grand Elderlord 7: Taigongwang Resorts to Extortion); 156. "The Adventure of Taijo Rokun, Part 8 - Awakening" (太上老君をめぐる冒険8—覚醒—, Taijō Rōkun o Meguru Bōken 8 —Kakusei—; The Adventure of the Grand Elderlord 8: Awakening); 157. "The Battle of Menchi Castle, Part 1 - Chokei and His Power Team!" (澠(メン)池(チ)城(じょう)の攻(こう)防(ぼう)㊤(じょう)—バーサス‼土(ど)竜(りゅう)爪(そう)ver.(バージョン)張(ちょう)奎(けい)・高(こう)蘭(らん)英(えい)・霊(れい)獣(じゅう)烏(う)煙(えん)の最(さい)強(きょう)チーム!!!—, Menchi-jō no Kōbō Jō —Bāsasu‼ Doryūsō Bājon Chō Kei Kō Ran'ei Reijū Uen no Saikyō Chīmu!!!—; The Battle of Mianchi Castle (First Part): Vs. ‼ Earth Dragon Claws version the Strongest Team of Zhang Kui, Gao Lanying and Spirit Beast Wuyan!!!); 158. "The Battle of Menchi Castle, Part 2 - The Teachings of Taijo Rokun" (澠(メン)池(チ)城(じょう)の攻(こう)防(ぼう)㊥(ちゅう)—太(たい)上(じょう)老(ろう)君(くん)の教(おし)え—, Menchi-jō no Kōbō Chū —Taijō Rōkun no Oshie—; The Battle of Mianchi Castle (Middle Part): The Grand Elderlord's Teachings); 159. "The Battle of Menchi Castle, Part 3 - The Hoshindai" (澠(メン)池(チ)城(じょう)の攻(こう)防(ぼう)㊦(げ)—封(ほう)神(しん)台(だい)—, Menchi-jō no Kōbō Ge —Hōshindai—; The Battle of Mianchi Castle (Last Part): Ground of Apotheosis); 160. "The Battle of The Plains - Introduction" (牧野の戦い—イントロダクション—, Bokuya no Tatakai —Intorodakushon—)
19	The Battle of The Plains (牧野の戦い, Bokuya no Tatakai; The Battle of the Plains)	April 4, 2000; 4-08-872845-9	June 1, 2010; 978-1-4215-2831-1
161. "The Battle of The Plains, Part 1 - The Taikyokuzu vs. the Keisei Genjo!" (牧野の戦い①—太極図vs傾世元禳—, Bokuya no Tatakai ① —Taikyokuzu bāsasu Keisei Genjō—; The Battle of the Plains ①: The Taiji Diagram vs. the Qingshi Yuanrang); 162. "The Battle of The Plains, Part 2 - Taikobo's Kin" (牧野の戦い②—血縁—, Bokuya no Tatakai ② —Ketsuen—; The Battle of the Plains ②: Consanguinity); 163. "The Battle of The Plains, Part 3 - The Emperor, King Chu" (牧野の戦い③—天子・紂王—, Bokuya no Tatakai ③ —Tenshi Chū Ō—; The Battle of the Plains ③: Heavenly Child, King Zhou); 164. "The Battle of The Plains, Part 4 - King Toh's Genes" (牧野の戦い④—湯王の因子—, Bokuya no Tatakai ④ —Tō Ō no Inshi—; The Battle of the Plains ④: King Tang's Genes); 165. "History's Guidepost, Part 1 - The Sand Castle" (歴史の道標一—砂の城—, Rekishi no Michishirube Ichi —Suna no Shiro—; History's Guidepost One: The Sand Castle); 166. "History's Guidepost, Part 2 - The Story Behind the Hoshin Project!" (歴史の道標二—封神計画の真相‼—, Rekishi no Michishirube Ni —Hōshin Keikaku no Shinsō—; History's Guidepost Two: The Truth Behind the Apotheosis Project‼); 167. "The Battle of The Plains, Part 5 - The Legend of King Toh" (牧野の戦い⑤—湯王伝説の再現—, Bokuya no Tatakai ⑤ —Tō Ō Densetsu no Saigen—; The Battle of the Plains ⑤: The Legend of King Tang, Reenacted); 168. "The Battle of The Plains, Part 6 - King Chu Realizes Solitude" (牧野の戦い⑥—紂王、牧野に孤立を知る—, Bokuya no Tatakai ⑥ —Chū Ō, Bokuya ni Koritsu o Shiru—; The Battle of the Plains ⑥: King Zhou Realizes His Solitude on the Plains); 169. "The Battle of The Plains, Part 7 - The End" (牧野の戦い⑦—終結—, Bokuya no Tatakai ⑦ —Shūketsu—; The Battle of the Plains ⑦: The End)
20	The Fall of the Yin Dynasty (殷王朝滅亡, In Ōchō Metsubō)	June 2, 2000; 4-08-872871-8	September 7, 2010; 978-1-4215-2832-8
170. "The Blood of the Ko Family, Part 1 - Tenka's Sacrifice" (黄家の血①—天化のゼルプスト—, Kō-ke no Chi ① —Tenka no Zerupusuto—; The Huang Family's Blood ①: Tianhua's Selbst); 171. "The Blood of the Ko Family, Part 2 - The Third Otenkun" (黄家の血②—三番目の王天君—, Kō-ke no Chi ② —Sanbanme no Ō Tenkun—; The Huang Family's Blood ②: The Third Skylord Wang); 172. "The Blood of the Ko Family, Part 3 - Tenka Is Sealed" (黄家の血③—天化封神—, Kō-ke no Chi ③ —Tenka Hōshin—; The Huang Family's Blood ③: Tianhua's Apotheosis); 173. "The Fall of the Yin Dynasty" (殷王朝滅亡, In Ōchō Metsubō); 174. "History's Guidepost, Part 3 - Omen" (歴史の道標三—予兆—, Rekishi no Michishirube San —Yochō—; History's Guidepost Three: Omen); 175. "History's Guidepost, Part 4 - Black Box" (歴史の道標四—BLACK BOX—, Rekishi no Michishirube Yon —Burakku Bokkusu—; History's Guidepost Four: Black Box); 176. "History's Guidepost, Part 5 - Horai, The Third Island" (歴史の道標五—第三の島・蓬莱島—, Rekishi no Michishirube Go —Daisan no Shima Hōrai-tō—; History's Guidepost Five: The Third Island, Penglai Island); Idle Talk 02. "Four Blasts at Mount Kongrong 2!" (崑崙山2 爆裂4連発!!!, Konron-san Tsū Bakuretsu 4 Renpatsu!!!; The Kunlun Mountains 2 Hit by Four Rapid-Fire Blasts); 177. "History's Guidepost, Part 6 - The Warp Zone" (歴史の道標六—ワープゾーン—, Rekishi no Michishirube Roku —Wāpu Zōn—; History's Guidepost Six: Warp Zone)
21	History's Guidepost, Part 1 (歴史の道標・上, Rekishi no Michishirube Jō; History's Guidepost: First Part)	September 4, 2000; 4-08-873007-0	December 7, 2010; 978-1-4215-2833-5
178. "History's Guidepost, Part 7 - Nento Dojin" (歴史の道標七—燃燈道人—, Rekishi no Michishirube Nana —Nentō Dōjin—; History's Guidepost Seven: Randeng Daoren); 179. "History's Guidepost, Part 8 - The Grand ♥ Grand ♥ Grand Paope Tournament ♥" (歴(れき)史(し)の道(みち)標(しるべ)八—大(だい)♡大(だい)♡大(だい)宝(パオ)貝(ペエ)大(たい)会(かい)大(だい)開(かい)催(さい)中(ちゅう)♡—, Rekishi no Michishirube Hachi —Dai♡Dai♡Dai-Paopē Taikai Daikaisaichū♡—; History's Guidepost Eight: The Grand ♡ Grand ♡ Grand Relic Tournament Grand Opening); 180. "History's Guidepost, Part 9 - The Pride of a Paope" (歴(れき)史(し)の道(みち)標(しるべ)九—気(け)高(だか)き宝(パオ)貝(ペエ)—, Rekishi no Michishirube Kyū —Kedakaki Paopē—; History's Guidepost Nine: The Sublime Relic); 181. "History's Guidepost, Part 10 - The Paope of Naught" (歴(れき)史(し)の道(みち)標(しるべ)十—無(む)の宝(パオ)貝(ペエ)—, Rekishi no Michishirube Jū —Mu no Paopē—; History's Guidepost Ten: The Relic of Naught); 182. "History's Guidepost, Part 11 - Okijin Returns!" (歴史の道標十一—帰ってきた王貴人‼—, Rekishi no Michishirube Jūichi —Kaettekita Ō Kijin‼—; History's Guidepost Eleven: Wang Guiren Is Back‼); 183. "History's Guidepost, Part 12 - The Modified Paope Human!" (歴(れき)史(し)の道(みち)標(しるべ)十二—宝(パオ)貝(ペエ)『改(かい)造(ぞう)』人(にん)間(げん)‼—, Rekishi no Michishirube Jūni —Paopē "Kaizō" Ningen‼—; History's Guidepost Twelve: The "Modified" Human Relic‼); 184. "History's Guidepost, Part 13 - Magical Transformation Girl Kokibi's Seven Transformations ★" (歴史の道標十三—マジカル変身美少女胡喜媚七変化☆—, Rekishi no Michishirube Jūsan —Majikaru Henshin Bishōjo Ko Kibi Shichihenge☆—; History's Guidepost Thirteen: Cute Magical Transforming Girl Hu Ximei: Seven Transformations ☆); 185. "History's Guidepost, Part 14 - The Yokai Who Gallops Through Time" (歴史の道標十四—時をかける妖怪—, Rekishi no Michishirube Jūyon —Toki o Kakeru Yōkai—; History's Guidepost Fourteen: The Yaoguai Who Gallops Through Time); 186. "Mirror, Part 1" (鏡1, Kagami 1; Mirror 1)
22	History's Guidepost, Part 2 (歴史の道標・下, Rekishi no Michishirube Ge; History's Guidepost: Last Part)	November 2, 2000; 4-08-873034-8	March 1, 2011; 978-1-4215-2834-2
187. "Mirror, Part 2" (鏡2, Kagami 2; Mirror 2); 188. "Mirror, Part 3" (鏡3, Kagami 3; Mirror 3); 189. "History's Guidepost, Part 15 - The First Human" (歴史の道標十五—最初の人—, Rekishi no Michishirube Jūgo —Saisho no Hito—; History's Guidepost Fifteen: The First Human); 190. "History's Guidepost, Part 16 - Fukki" (歴史の道標十六—伏羲—, Rekishi no Michishirube Jūroku —Fukki—; History's Guidepost Sixteen: Fuxi); 191. "History's Guidepost, Part 17 - Taikobo+Otenkun=Oeki=Fukki" (歴史の道標十七—太公望+王天君=王奕=伏羲—, Rekishi no Michishirube Jūnana —Taikōbō + Ō Tenkun = Ō Eki = Fukki—; History's Guidepost Seventeen: Taigongwang + Skylord Wang = Wang Yi = Fuxi); 192. "History's Guidepost, Part 18 - Joka Roars with Laughter" (歴(れき)史(し)の道(みち)標(しるべ)十八—女媧(ジョカ)・大(だい)爆(ばく)笑(しょう)—, Rekishi no Michishirube Jūhachi —Joka Daibakushō—; History's Guidepost Eighteen: Nuwa's Big Laugh); 193. "History's Guidepost, Part 19 - The Exchange of Dupings" (歴史の道標十九—だまし合い応酬—, Rekishi no Michishirube Jūkyū —Damashiai Ōshū—; History's Guidepost Nineteen: An Exchange with Mutual Deception); 194. "History's Guidepost, Part 20 - The Division of Souls" (歴史の道標二十—魂魄分裂—, Rekishi no Michishirube Nijū —Konpaku Bunretsu—; History's Guidepost Twenty: The Division of Souls); 195. "The Great Mother, Part 1 - The Bansenjin" (グレート・マザー①—万仙陣—, Gurēto Mazā ① —Bansenjin—; The Great Mother ①: The Wanxianzhen)
23	The Road with No Guidepost (導なき道へ..., Shirubenaki Michi e...; To the Road with No Guide Posts...)	December 22, 2000; 4-08-873059-3	June 7, 2011; 978-1-4215-2835-9
196. "The Great Mother, Part 2 - Her Body" (グレート・マザー②—肉体—, Gurēto Mazā ② —Nikutai—; The Great Mother ②: Fleshy Body); 197. "The Great Mother, Part 3 - Dakki's Secret" (グレート・マザー③—妲己ちゃんの秘密—, Gurēto Mazā ③ —Dakki-chan no Himitsu—; The Great Mother ③: Daji-chan's Secret); 198. "The Great Mother, Part 4 - The Quiet Awakening" (グレート・マザー④—静動—, Gurēto Mazā ④ —Seidō—; The Great Mother ④: The Quiet Awakening); 199. "The Great Mother, Part 5 - Absorption" (グレート・マザー⑤—吸収—, Gurēto Mazā ⑤ —Kyūshū—; The Great Mother ⑤: Absorption); 200. "The Hoshindai Is Set Free!" (封神台解放‼, Hōshindai Kaihō; The Ground of Apotheosis Is Set Free‼); 201. "The Road with No Guidepost, Part 1" (導なき道へ...㊤, Shirubenaki Michi e... Jō; To the Road with No Guide Posts... (First Part)); 202. "The Road with No Guidepost, Part 2" (導なき道へ...㊦, Shirubenaki Michi e... Ge; To the Road with No Guide Posts... (Last Part)); 203. "Picking Up The Pieces, Part 1" (あとしまつ㊤, Atoshimatsu Jō; Picking up the Pieces (First Part)); 204. "Picking Up The Pieces, Part 2" (あとしまつ㊦, Atoshimatsu Ge; Picking up the Pieces (Last Part))
