= Yang Sen (disambiguation) =

Yang Sen (1884–1977) was a Chinese warlord and general.

Yang Sen may also refer to:

- Yang Sen (baseball) (born 1981), Taiwanese baseball player
- Yeung Sum (born 1947), also Yang Sen in pinyin, Hong Kong politician
- Victor Sen Yung (1915–1980), American character actor
- Yang Sen (athlete), Chinese gold medal winner at the 2008 Summer Paralympics
- Yang Sen (Investiture of the Gods), Investiture of the Gods character
