= Collett =

Collett may refer to:

- Collett (name), a list of people with the surname or given name
  - Collett family
- Collett baronets, a title in the Baronetage of the United Kingdom
- USS Collett, a US Navy destroyer
- Collett, Indiana, an unincorporated town in the United States
- Collett Park, a public park in Terre Haute, Indiana, on the National Register of Historic Places
- The Collett School, a 4–16 mixed community special school in Hemel Hempstead, Hertfordshire, England
- Collett, an alias of singer and songwriter Chloe George

== See also ==
- Collet, a holding device in machining
- Collett's Snake, a venomous snake native to Australia
- Colet (disambiguation)
- Collette (disambiguation)
- Colette (disambiguation)
