= The Bloke's Guide To Pregnancy =

2004 book by Jon Smith

- Cover
- Author: Jon Smith
- Language: English
- Subject: Fatherhood, parenting
- Genre: Non-fiction
- Publisher: Hay House
- Publication date: July 2004
- Publication place: United Kingdom, United States, Australia
- Pages: 256 pp
- ISBN: 978-1-4019-0288-9

The Bloke's Guide To Pregnancy is a 2004 book by Jon Smith, a father and Internet marketer. The book provides advice and information to expectant and new fathers and outlines what a father can expect to see, think, and feel over the nine months of pregnancy. The book has generated some online debate regarding the role of fathers during pregnancy.

In September 2004, The Bloke's Guide To Pregnancy was the most popular book about fatherhood on Amazon.co.uk. The book has been translated into Korean.

== Synopsis ==
This book takes a sensible-yet-humorous look at the many stages of pregnancy. It explores the physical and emotional changes that men can expect to see in their partner and in their relationship during pregnancy.
