= Colette (surname) =

Colette is a surname. Notable people with the surname include:

- Anne Collette (born 1937), French actress
- Claude Colette (1929–1990), French racing cyclist
- Gisèle Colette (1920–2003), French swimmer
- Irié Lou Colette (died 2021), Ivorian businesswoman
- Jacques Colette (born 1929), Belgian philosopher
- Sidonie-Gabrielle Colette (1873–1954), French novelist
- Sheena Colette, American actress
- Théo Colette (born 1927), Belgian footballer

== See also ==
- Colette (disambiguation)
- Coletta (surname)
- Collette (surname)
