= Eva Lee =

Eva Lee may refer to:

- Eva Lee (badminton) (born 1986), Hong Kong-born American badminton player
- Eva K. Lee, Hong Kong-born American applied mathematician and operations researcher
- Eva Y.-H. P. Lee, Taiwanese molecular biologist
