= Musha =

Musha may refer to:

== Places ==
- Musha, Egypt
- Musha, Rwanda
- Musha Cay, an island in the Bahamas

== Video games ==
- MUSHA, a 1990 shoot 'em up for the Sega Genesis
- Musya, a 1992 side-scrolling action game for the Super NES

== Other uses ==
- Musha land, common agricultural lands in the Ottoman Empire
- Musha Motors, a fictional car company in the Speed Racer film adaptation

== See also ==
- Muzha (disambiguation)
