= Coletta (surname) =

Coletta is a surname. Notable people with the surname include:

- Chris Coletta (born 1944), baseball player
- Chris Coletta (cyclist) (born 1972), American cyclist
- Damiano Coletta, (born 1960), Italian politician, physician and footballer
- Gabriela Coletta (born 1968), American politician
- Jacopo Coletta, (born 1992), Italian footballer
- John Coletta (1932–2006), English music manager and producer
- Kim Coletta, bassist for Jawbox
- Sabino Coletta (1914-?), Argentine footballer

== See also ==
- Coletta (disambiguation)
- Colette (surname)
