= Jim Kwik =

American businessman

- Born: July 29, 1973 (age 52); Westchester, New York
- Occupation: Author, brain coach, podcast host
- Notable work: Limitless
- Website: www.jimkwik.com

Jim Kwik (born July 29, 1973) is an American brain coach, podcaster, writer, and entrepreneur. He is the founder of Kwik Learning, an online learning platform; the host of the Kwik Brain podcast; and the author of Limitless, published by Hay House in 2020.

== Biography ==
Kwik was born and raised in Westchester, New York. He had significant learning challenges as the result of a traumatic brain injury he sustained when he was in kindergarten and taught himself to read and write by reading comic books. He later taught himself to speed read.

In 2001, he founded Kwik Learning. He taught accelerated learning programs in classrooms and at companies until 2009, when Kwik Learning launched as an online learning platform. As of 2022, it had been used by students in 195 countries.

The Kwik Brain podcast debuted in 2017 and in 2022 became one of the top educational podcasts on iTunes. Limitless was released in 2020. It appeared on The Wall Street Journal, New York Times and USA Today bestseller lists.

Kwik speaks at conferences and seminars on accelerated learning techniques.

== Bibliography ==
- Limitless: Upgrade Your Brain, Learn Anything Faster, and Unlock Your Exceptional Life; Hay House; April 7, 2020; 344 pp; ISBN 1401958230
