= Hay House =

United States publishing company

- Status: Active
- Founded: 1984; 41 years ago
- Founder: Louise Hay
- Country of origin: United States
- Headquarters location: Carlsbad, California
- Key people: Louise Hay, founder Reid Tracy, president-CEO
- Publication types: Books, audio, video, radio, apps
- Nonfiction topics: New Thought, self-help, psychic reading, energy healing, meditation, tarot cards, alternative medicine, numerology, astrology, angels, diet, health
- Owner: Penguin Random House
- Official website: www.hayhouse.com

Hay House is a publisher founded in 1984 by author Louise Hay, who is known for her books on New Thought. The New York Times dubbed Hay "The Queen of the New Age," noting that she became "one of the bestselling authors in history." Hay House describes itself as a "mind–body–spirit and transformational enterprise". Their target audience is readers interested in self-help, personal growth, and alternative medicine. Hay House was acquired by Penguin Random House in 2023.

== History ==
Hay House was founded in 1984 and incorporated in 1987, to market Louise Hay's self-help books, including, Heal Your Body and You Can Heal Your Life. Soon after, Hay House began publishing for other authors who fall into the category of mind–body–spirit such as Wayne Dyer, Suze Orman, Deepak Chopra, Marianne Williamson, Esther Hicks, Iyanla Vanzant, Kris Carr, Colette Baron-Reid, Jim Kwik, Brendon Burchard, Gabrielle Bernstein, and Elizabeth Hamilton Guarino.

Reid Tracy joined Hay House as an accountant in 1988. He went on to take over as the CEO in 1990 at the age of 25. It is headquartered in Carlsbad, California, with auxiliary offices in New York City, London, Sydney, Johannesburg, and Mumbai.

According to The New York Times Magazine, the publisher sold more than 6 million books and other products in 2007, bringing in US$100 million in revenues. As of 2018, Hay House reports that they publish books by more than 130 authors and sell their products and services in over 35 countries and that they employ over 100 full-time staff members.

In 2018, Hay House created a dedicated business imprint, Hay House Business. In 2023, Hay House was acquired by Penguin Random House.

In his statement on the news of the acquisition, Penguin Random House CEO Nihar Malaviya said, "As we deepen our relationship with Hay House, we're thrilled to support the company's growth and explore the areas of opportunity in their publishing services. Hay House is one of the most recognized health, wellness, and self-help brands in the world, and we look forward to working with Reid and his team on expanding upon their innovative and diverse product offerings."

== Mission and practice ==
Hay House publishes authors who write on such topics as psychic reading, energy healing, meditation, tarot cards, alternative medicine, numerology, astrology, and holistic health. Hay House hosts group events where fans can pay for admission to seminars by the authors who can then make presentations. They also publish CDs, DVDs, calendars and card decks.

The publisher also offers a radio station, Hay House Radio, which provides live radio shows by Hay House authors. They also have spin off websites such as Hay House Online Learning, a place to take online classes by their authors, and Heal Your Life, an online self-help and personal growth program. These services are available as applications for phones and tablets. They also have a division called Balboa Press, a self publishing company, which was created in partnership with Author Solutions in 2010.

Hay House promotes the idea that "traditional Western learning, as codified by universities that bestow fancy degrees, is woefully incomplete, sometimes harmful, and must be supplemented by other ways of knowing". Hay House founder, Louise Hay, explains that Hay House does not actually endorse everything their authors write. They also do turn away some authors and work hard to stay on trend with the latest fashions in self-help.

In a 2008 article, Oppenheimer quoted CEO Reid Tracy as saying: "As of right now we've sold over 40 million products in the U.S., and we think a lot of those people have been helped." Hay House does not test the claims made by their authors. The authors gain merit with the publisher based on the testimonials they receive as opposed to the credibility or accuracy of their claims.

== Notable authors ==
- Wayne W. Dyer, author
- John Edward, psychic medium
- Kyle Gray, bestselling author
- Gay Hendricks, psychologist
- Suze Orman, financial advisor
- Tavis Smiley, talk show host
- Montel Williams, television personality
