= Robert Bixby =

American mathematician

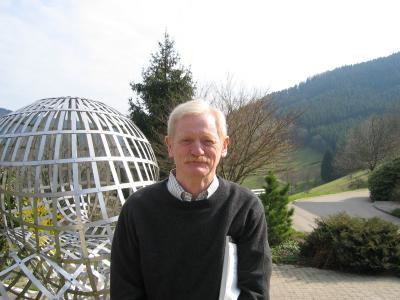
Robert E. Bixby

Robert E. Bixby is an American mathematician, the Noah Harding Professor Emeritus of Computational and Applied Mathematics at Rice University.

Bixby received a Bachelor of Science with a major in industrial engineering from the University of California, Berkeley (1968) and a Doctor of Philosophy in operations research from Cornell University (1972). His dissertation, Composition and Decomposition of Matroids and Related Topics, concerned matroid theory and was supervised by Louis Billera. His doctoral students have included Collette Coullard at Northwestern University, and Eva K. Lee at Rice.

He is the President and Co-founder of Gurobi Optimization. In 1987 he co-founded CPLEX Optimization, which was acquired by ILOG in 1997.

Bixby was elected a member of the National Academy of Engineering in 1997 for contributions to combinatorial optimization and the development and commercialization of high-performance optimization software. He is also a fellow of the Institute for Operations Research and the Management Sciences.
