= Collette =

Collette is both a surname and a given name. Notable people with the name include:

== Surname ==
- Anthony Colette (born 1995), French dancer and artist
- Bruce Baden Collette (born 1934), American ichthyologist
- Buddy Collette (1921–2010), American jazz musician
- Toni Collette (born 1972), Australian actress, producer, singer, and songwriter
- Yann Collette (born 1956), French actor

== Given name ==
- Collette Cassidy, American TV news anchor
- Collette Coullard, American mathematician
- Collette McCallum (born 1986), Australia football player
- Collette Roberts, Australian singer
- Collette Stevenson, Scottish politician

== See also ==
- "Collette" by The Durutti Column from the album The Return of the Durutti Column
- Colette (disambiguation)
- Collett (disambiguation)
- Colette (surname)
