= Paul Jarrett =

American entrepreneur (born 1981)

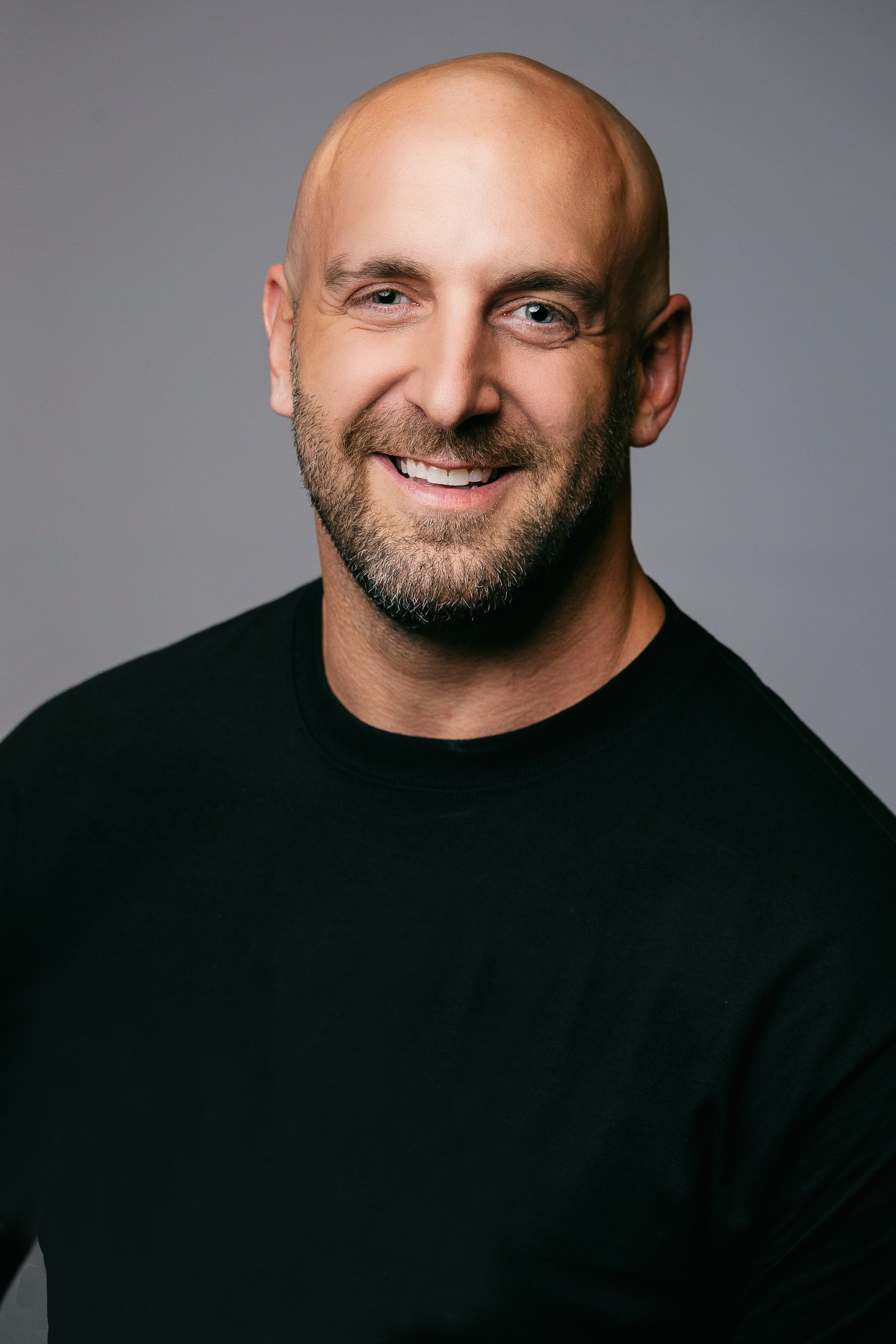
Jarrett in 2019

Paul Jarrett (born July 15, 1981) is an American entrepreneur. He is the co-founder and chief executive officer (CEO) of Bulu. He has assisted with the launch of dozens of subscription boxes including Bulu Box, the Onnit Keto box, and the Disney Princess Enchanted collection. He played football at Iowa State University during the 2000 and 2001 seasons under head coach Dan McCarney.

== Early life ==
Jarrett was born to William "Bill" Jarrett and Corinne Jarrett (née Benes) in Lincoln, Nebraska. William Jarrett served 36 years in law enforcement, retiring in 2012 from his position as Lancaster County Sheriff's Chief Deputy; then joining the Lancaster County Treasurer's office as Chief Deputy for 3 years before retiring again in 2015.

Jarrett began his football career young, playing in a number of children's leagues. He joined the Pius X High School football team. Jarrett played during the Pius X Thunderbolts’ Nebraska State Championship win in 1998.

== College and sports ==
Jarrett joined the Iowa State Cyclones football team in 2000 as a freshman, starting as a defensive lineman under coach Dan McCarney. That year, the Cyclones participated in their first bowl game since 1978 and won the program's first bowl game.

Jarrett played on the 2001 team but chose not to return to the team for the 2002 year due to concerns about aggravating existing injuries. Without his football scholarship, Jarrett transferred to the University of Nebraska-Lincoln to finish his college career closer to home.

== Career ==
In 2007, Jarrett joined BBDO as an account executive. Jarrett left BBDO in April 2008 to join Nebraska Book Company in launching their new brand, Neebo.

From Neebo, Jarrett joined the startup Complete Nutrition in 2010 as VP of Marketing. During Jarrett's tenure, Complete Nutrition ranked #517 on the Inc. 5000 list of fastest growing companies in the US.

In 2012, after completing the San Francisco Half Marathon, Jarrett and his wife, Stephanie Jarrett, began working on the concept for their startup subscription box company, Bulu Box. Combining his personal trial-and-error experience in his efforts to lose 100 lbs after leaving the Iowa State Cyclones football team and professional experience at Complete Nutrition using the “spray and pray” product sampling method to obtain new customers, plus Stephanie's extensive marketing, strategy and design skills, the Jarretts launched Bulu Box in 2012.

=== Bulu Box ===
Paul Jarrett and his wife and co-founder, Stephanie Jarrett launched Bulu Box from their San Francisco apartment in early spring 2012. Following a meeting with a potential investor, the Jarretts moved their business to Lincoln, Nebraska in time to ship the first Bulu Box subscriptions in June 2012.

As Co-founder and CEO of Bulu Box, Jarrett has received a number of accolades from the startup community and the state of Nebraska. Among his awards are Innovator of the Year from the Pipeline Entrepreneurs network (2013).

In August 2017, Bulu Box was ranked No. 1899 on the Inc. 5000 list of the fastest-growing privately held US companies.

=== Bulu Turnkey Subscription Box Services ===
In 2016 Bulu partnered with GNC to add a vitamin and supplement sample box to their newly launched PRO Membership program. This marked the beginning of many partnerships between Bulu and Fortune 500 companies that were eager to capitalize on the growing popularity of subscriptions boxes. Paul and the Bulu team began offering Turnkey Subscription Box Solutions which included product development, website creation, custom support, financial management and kitting and fulfillment for subscription box programs. Paul assisted with the launch of dozens of subscription box programs including Lunarly for Scotts Miracle Grow, the Disney Princess Enchanted Collection, The Disney Bedtime Adventure box and many others for brands like Crayola, Onnit, Giant Eagle and more. Under Paul's guidance, Bulu quickly became the industry authority in creating private-label Subscription Box businesses.

== Personal life ==
Jarrett has been a member of Lincoln Mayor Chris Beutler’s Recycling Committee from 2015 to present. With his fellow committee members, who include elected officials and prominent business owners, Jarrett consults with the city of Lincoln on matters of public policy.

In 2016, Jarrett was chosen to attend The Immersion, an invitation-only experience curated by Lululemon. Jarrett participated in the Immersion alongside Baron Baptiste and Gabrielle Bernstein.
