= Colette (disambiguation) =

Colette (1873–1954) is the pen name of the French novelist Sidonie-Gabrielle Colette.

Colette may also refer to:

== People ==
- Colette (given name)
- Colette (surname)
- Colette of Corbie (1381–1447), French abbess and saint
- DJ Colette (born Colette Marino in 1975), American DJ and house musician

== Miscellaneous ==
- Colette (2013 film), a Czech-Slovak-Dutch film about a prisoner of Auschwitz
- Colette (2018 film), a U.S.-U.K.-Hungary film, starring Keira Knightley as author Colette
- Colette (2020 film), a US short documentary directed by Anthony Giacchino
- Colette (boutique), a Parisian boutique
- Place Colette, a square in Paris, France
- Colette (horse), an Australian thoroughbred racehorse

== See also ==
- Coletta (disambiguation)
- Collette (disambiguation)
- Collett (disambiguation)
