= Coletta =

Coletta may refer to:

- Coletta (reptile), an extinct genus of basal procolophonid parareptile
- Coletta (surname)
- Coletta Rydzek (born 1997), German cross-country skier

== See also ==
- Colette (disambiguation)
- Colletta (disambiguation)
