= The Foursome =

- Directed by: William Dear
- Screenplay by: Jackson Davies
- Starring: Kevin Dillon
- Music by: Chris Ainscough
- Production company: Rampage Entertainment
- Distributed by: Screen Media Films (United States); Kaboom! Entertainment (Canada)
- Release date: 2006
- Running time: 80 minutes
- Countries: United States; Canada
- Language: English

The Foursome is a 2006 American/Canadian comedy film. It is about four college friends who reconnect at their 20-year college reunion on the golf course. The film stars Kevin Dillon, John Shaw, Chris Gauthier and Paul Jarrett. The film was directed by William Dear and written by Jackson Davies, based on the play by Norm Foster.

== Synopsis ==
The film starts with the four friends Rick, Cameron, Donnie and Ted arriving at their college reunion party and re-introducing themselves. Cam, Donnie and Ted are all married, but Rick's girlfriend, Susanne, says that she won't marry Rick because he can't commit. Cam is married to his high-school sweetheart, Lori, who slept around a lot in college. Ted was previously divorced, but got married a second time to a young woman in her mid twenties, while Ted was in his early forties.

The next morning, the four friends meet on the golf course, and decide to play in two teams of two for money, low score winning the hole. Cam pairs up with Ted, and Rick with Donnie, who has never golfed in his life. Rick hits a 300-yard drive, while Cam and Ted struggle and Donnie takes many tries to hit the ball, but finally hits it into a tree. Rick then says he is an avid golfer and a hustler. Rick and Donnie win the first five nine holes, with Ted and Cam getting frustrated.

Near the end of the round, Cam tells Ted how he can't afford the $2500 they bet on the game, so Ted tells Rick they want to press, so they would play another 18 holes for $5000. They would play with the same teams, starting even. That night at the bar, Donnie sees Rick and Lori go into the janitor's closet, and Lori leaves tucking her panties into her purse. The other wives compare themselves to Ted's young wife, and reminisce about how they used to look like that. The night ends with Donnie suspecting Rick and Lori are having an affair.

During the second round, Rick and Donnie continue to lead, but Donnie continues to struggle. In the middle of the round, Rick tells Donnie to hit into the group ahead, but he hits into the trees. Rick hits soon after, nearly hitting one of them, then all four of them run into the trees. Later into the round, Donnie calls on Rick for cheating with Lori, and Cam storms off, but Rick proves they weren't in there nearly long enough to have sex, so the allegations are dropped. The three other golfers go back to the clubhouse to find Cam, and tell him that Lori isn't cheating on him. Rick then convinces Susanne to marry him after he proves he can commit to a relationship. Soon after, they go back out to finish their game.

On the last hole, in the dark, Ted hits his second shot close to the pin. Cam then says he was fired from his TV exec job two weeks earlier and can't afford to lose this game. Rick is also on the green, close to the pin, starting to feel for his friend, and his loss and desperation. On the green, Cam narrowly misses his birdie putt leaving it on the lip, leaving Rick with a putt to win. Rick feels bad for Cam and shifts his putter head slightly, hits his ball into Cam's ball and knocks Cam's ball into the hole, giving Cam and Ted the win. It is at that moment that Cam says he wasn't fired, he hustled the hustler, Rick. After that, the four of them sing the Bryan Adams song "18 'Til I Die", a song familiar to them from college. The film ends and the credits roll with the four jumping in mid-air on the 18th green.

== Cast ==
- Kevin Dillon as Rick Foster
- John Shaw as Cameron Towers
- Chris Gauthier as Donnie Spencer
- Paul Jarrett as Ted Renton
- Leila Johnson as Susanne Brindle
- Nicole Oliver as Lori Towers
- Ellie Harvie as Peggy Spencer
- Siri Baruc as Karen Smith
- Sarah Penikett as Stacey Peters
- Stephanie Penikett as Tracey Peters
- Matty Finochio as a course marshal
- Beverley Elliott as Wendy Oakley
- Norm Foster as a praying golfer
