= Colette Baron-Reid =

Canadian public speaker (born 1958)

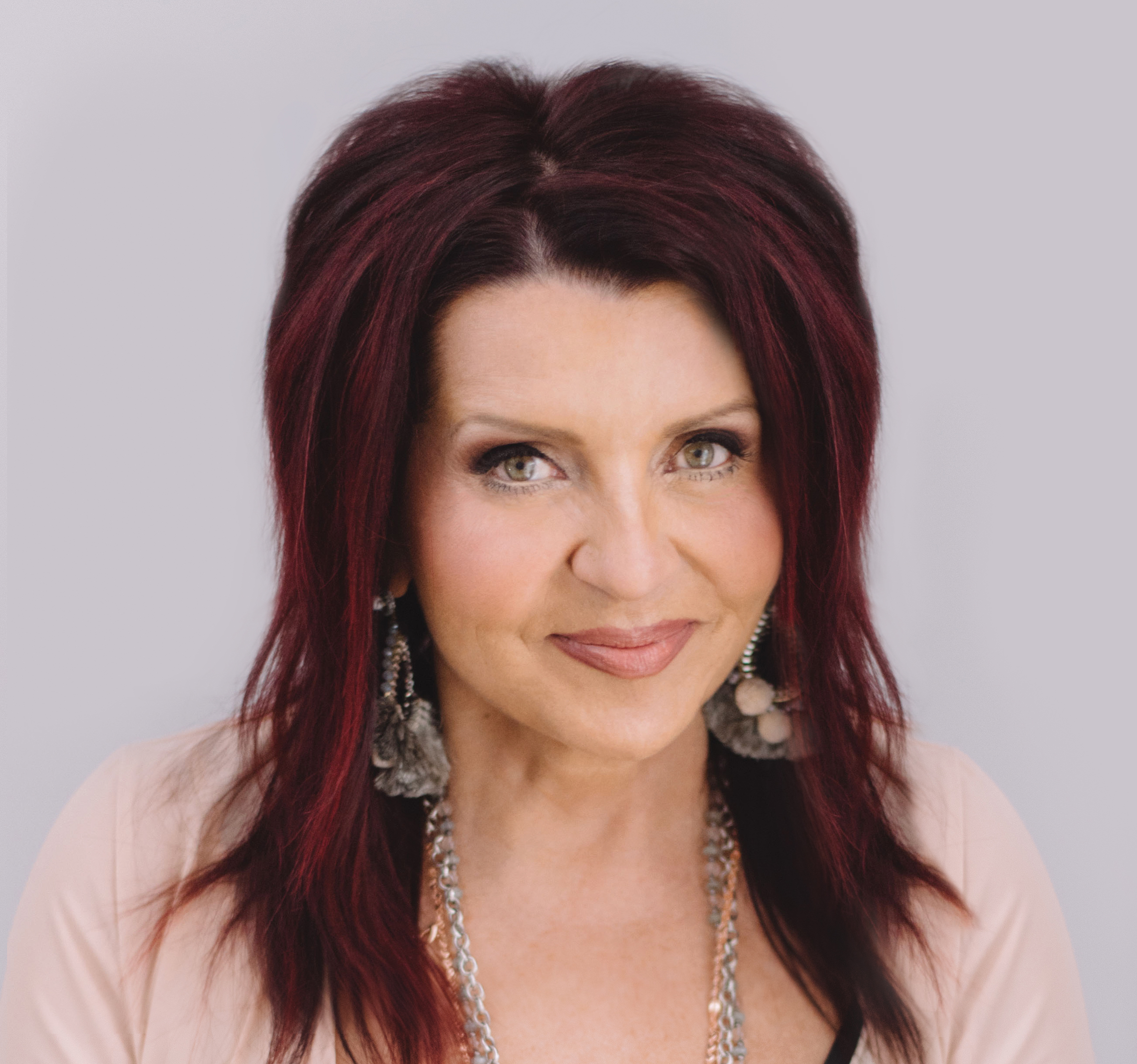
- Baron-Reid in 2019
- Born: 1958 (age 67–68); Toronto, Ontario, Canada
- Occupations: Author and public speaker
- Writing career
- Period: 1986–present
- Subject: Spirituality
- Website: colettebaronreid.com

Colette Baron-Reid (born 1958) is a Canadian writer, public speaker, and self-proclaimed spiritual medium and oracle expert.

== Early life ==
Baron-Reid was born in Toronto, Ontario, Canada. Her mother was a French, German, and Polish homemaker, and her Serbian father was a wealthy Toronto land developer and engineer. (Note: The Toronto Star wrote in 2000 that Baron-Reid's father was a Holocaust survivor, but did not mention if her mother was one. The Calgary Herald wrote in 2001 that her mother was a Holocaust survivor, but did not mention if her father was one.)

Baron-Reid attended Havergal College for women in Toronto. She claimed to have her first experience with clairvoyance at three years old and continued to have similar experiences, in the form of dreams or glimpses of the past or future, as she got older.

== Career ==
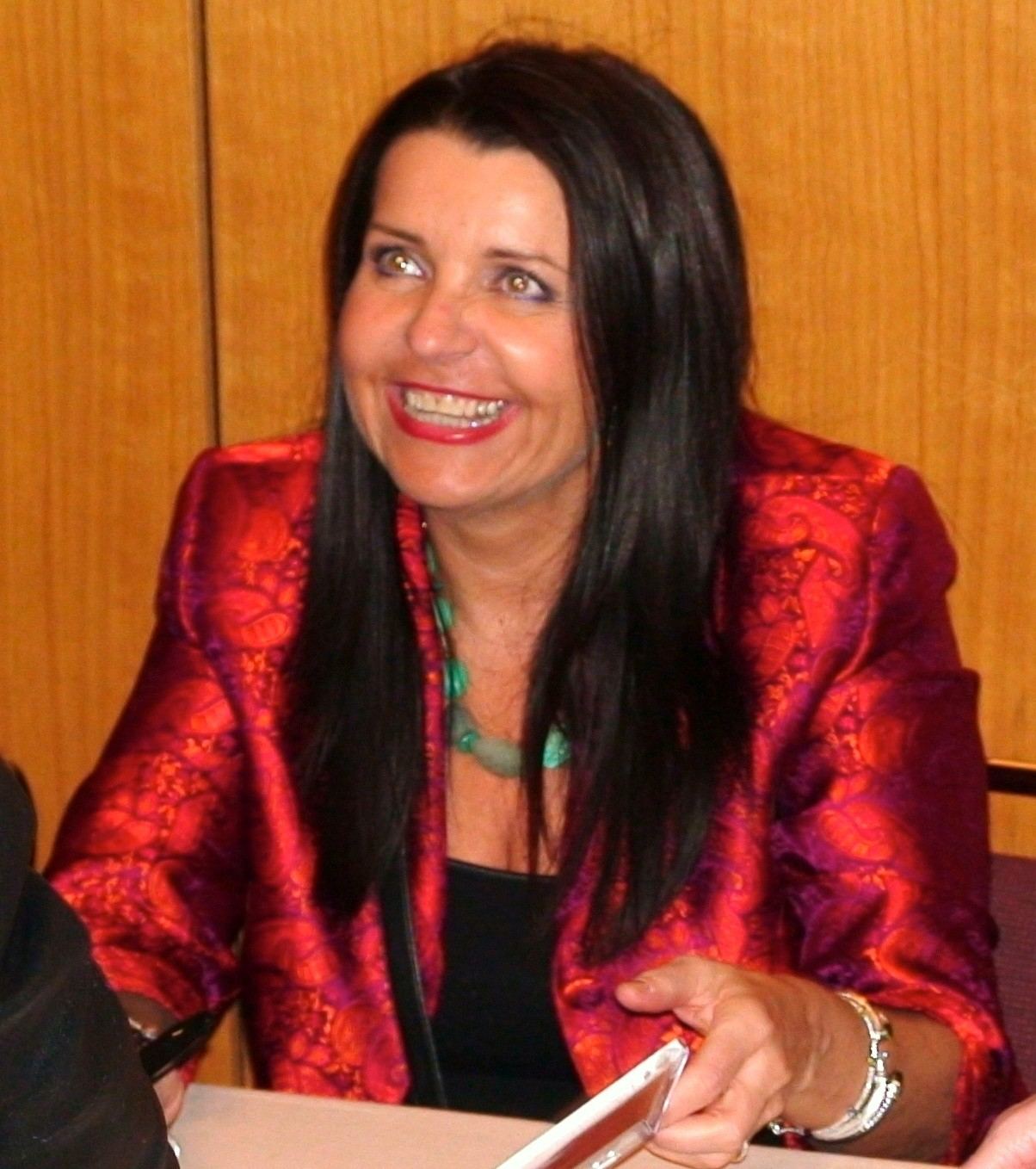
Baron-Reid at a book signing in the U.S. in 2008

Baron-Reid ran away from her home when she was 18 years old, first joining a disco band and then moving on to various other bands. She received various deals for records or management, all of which ultimately failed. At 28 years old, she eventually "bottomed out" after ten years performing in bars and nightclubs, and she began going to a women's treatment centre for an alcohol and cocaine addiction. After becoming sober, she began practicing aromatherapy and seeing clients to speak about visions she claimed to have experienced about them. In 1998, she published a tape on meditation, Journey Through The Chakra, which was reviewed by the Toronto Star; around this time, she described feeling as if there were no more opportunities for her as a musician.

Baron-Reid was asked to appear in a documentary on spiritualists in the late 1990s, which led her to meet record producer Eric Rosse, who was the film's composer. She then met with the record label EMI to ask to work with Rosse. She released two records with EMI: Magdalene's Garden (2001), produced by Rosse, and I Am/Grace. The first album was described by the Calgary Herald as an "ambitious soft-pop album inspired by the likes of Kate Bush, Stevie Nicks, and Annie Lennox and incorporating a potpourri of musical styles."

In 2006, her contract was terminated, after which she decided to pursue a career as an author and public speaker. She authored her first book, Remembering The Future (2006), on her experience dealing with substance addiction. Her next novel was The Map (2010). She published a dieting book, Weight Loss for People Who Feel Too Much, in 2013; by this time she had made appearances on the talk shows Dr. Phil, The Oprah Winfrey Show, and The Dr. Oz Show; was an opening act for shows by her publisher, Hay House; and was working as a columnist and blogger for Zoomer magazine. In a 2015 Fortune magazine article, Toronto realtor Gillian Oxley, who was quoted as earning around $100 million in yearly sales, attributed her success to her coaching sessions with Baron-Reid since 2013.

In 2015, Baron-Reid's sold-out show at the University of Alberta was met with protestors from the Society of Edmonton Atheists, who said that communication with the dead is impossible and urged patrons to be more skeptical of these claims.

Speaking with author Amal Awad about cultural appropriation in the New Age industry for Awad's 2021 book, Baron-Reid stated: "I faced my own biases and came to realise how I was participating in a harmful system". She said she had hired two coaches specialising in diversity, inclusivity, and anti-racism, and also examined her own influences, leading her to address Native American imagery in current and future publications and request her publisher, Hay House, to amend the publications.

== Personal life ==
Baron-Reid was living with her husband in New Hampshire by 2013. Her husband has helped manage her business ventures.

== Bibliography ==
- Baron-Reid, Colette (2006). Remembering The Future: The Path To Recovering Intuition. Hay House. ISBN 9781401919580.
- — (2007). The Wisdom of Avalon Oracle Cards. Hay House. ISBN 9781401910426.
- — (2008). Messages From Spirit. Hay House. ISBN 9781401922108.
- — (2009). The Wisdom of the Hidden Realms. Hay House. ISBN 9781401923426.
- — (2010). The Map: Finding The Magic and Meaning In the Story of Your Life. Hay House. ISBN 9781401912444.
- — (2011). The Enchanted Map Oracle. Hay House. ISBN 9781401927493.
- Cast, P.C.; Baron-Reid, Colette (2012). Wisdom of the House of Night Oracle Cards: A 50-Card Deck and Guidebook.
- Baron-Reid, Colette (2013). Weight Loss for People Who Feel Too Much: A 4-Step, 8-Week Plan to Finally Lose the Weight, Manage Your Emotions, and Find Your Fabulous Self. Harmony Books.
- — (2018). Uncharted: The Journey through Uncertainty to Infinite Possibility. Hay House. ISBN 9781401948634.
- — (2015). The Wisdom of the Oracle. Hay House. ISBN 9781401946425.
- — (2017). The Good Tarot. Hay House. ISBN 9781401949501.
- — (2017). Postcards from Spirit. Hay House. ISBN 9781401951535.
- —; Villoldo, Alberto; Lobos, Marcela (2018). Mystical Shaman Oracle Cards: A 64-Card Oracle Deck and Guidebook. Hay House.
- — (2018). The Spirit Animal Oracle. Hay House. ISBN 9781401952792.
- — (2019). The Goddess Power Oracle. Hay House. ISBN 9781401959340.
- — (2019). The Crystal Spirits Oracle. Hay House. ISBN 9781401952808.
- — (2020). Oracle of the 7 Energies Oracle. Hay House. ISBN 9781401956974.
- — (2020). Oracle of the 7 Energies Journal. Hay House. ISBN 9781401962913.
- —; Villoldo, Alberto (2021). The Shaman's Dream Oracle. Hay House. ISBN 9781401959128.
- — (2022). The Oracle Card Journal: A Daily Practice for Igniting Your Insight, Intuition, and Magic. Hay House. ISBN 9781401969851.
- — (2023). The Dream Weaver's Oracle. Hay House. ISBN 9781401962036.

== Discography ==
- Magdalene's Garden (2001, EMI Music Canada)
- I Am/Grace (2005, EMI Music Canada)
- Journey Through The Chakras (2007, Hay House)
- Messages from Spirit 4-CD: Exploring Your Connection to Divine Guidance (2008, Hay House)
