= Colette Hume =

British journalist

Colette Hume is the Education Correspondent for BBC Wales Today as well as a network stand-in for Wales Correspondent Wyre Davies for BBC News network services.

She is originally from the North-East of England and has previously worked for the BBC's Breakfast news programme.
