= Jacopo Coletta =

Italian footballer

Personal information
- Date of birth: 19 April 1992 (age 34)
- Place of birth: Rome, Italy
- Height: 1.85 m (6 ft 1 in)
- Position: Goalkeeper

Team information
- Current team: San Marino

Youth career
- ChievoVerona

Senior career*
Years	Team	Apps	(Gls)
2012–2014	ChievoVerona	0	(0)
2012–2013	→ Lumezzane (loan)	4	(0)
2013–2014	→ SPAL (loan)	1	(0)
2014–2015	Fondi	24	(0)
2016	Lupa Cast Roma	0	(0)
2016–2018	Fondi	9	(0)
2018–2019	Picerno	26	(0)
2019–2025	Lucchese	86	(0)
2025–	San Marino	0	(0)
- * Club domestic league appearances and goals as of 27 April 2025

Jacopo Coletta (born 19 April 1992) is an Italian professional footballer who plays as a goalkeeper for Serie D club San Marino.

== Club career ==
Born in Rome, Coletta started his career in ChievoVerona youth sector. For the 2012–13 season, he was loaned to Lega Pro club Lumezzane. He made his professional debut on 20 January 2013 against Pavia.

On 10 October 2019, he signed with Serie D club Lucchese as a free agent.
