= Collette Coullard =

American mathematician

Professor Collette Coullard
- Citizenship: American
- Education: Northwestern University; Lake Superior State University
- Known for: Optimization, Combinatorial Optimization, Graph Theory, Network Optimization, Transportation, Supply Chain Management, Operations Research
- Honours: Charles Deering McCormick Professor of Teaching Excellence, 1996 to 1999. Kenneth J. Shouldice Achievement Award, 2003.

Collette René Coullard is an American mathematician, industrial engineer, operations researcher, and matroid theorist known for her research on combinatorial optimization problems that combine facility location and stock management. Formerly a professor at Purdue University, the University of Waterloo, Northwestern University, and Lake Superior State University, she has retired to become a professor emeritus.

== Education and career ==
Coullard graduated in 1980 from Lake Superior State University, and earned her Ph.D. in 1985 from Northwestern University. Her dissertation, Minors of 3-Connected Matroids and Adjoints of Binary Matroids, concerned matroid theory and was supervised by Robert E. Bixby.

She taught at Purdue University and visited the University of Waterloo before returning to Northwestern as a faculty member in 1990, and retired as a mathematics professor from Lake Superior State University in 2018. She has also visited the University of Bonn as a Humboldt Fellow.

== Recognition ==
Coullard received the National Science Foundation Presidential Young Investigator Award in 1989. She was a Charles Deering McCormick Professor of Teaching Excellence at Northwestern University from 1996 to 1999. In 2003, the Lake Superior State University Alumni Association gave her their annual Kenneth J. Shouldice Achievement Award.
