= Eva K. Lee =

American operations researcher

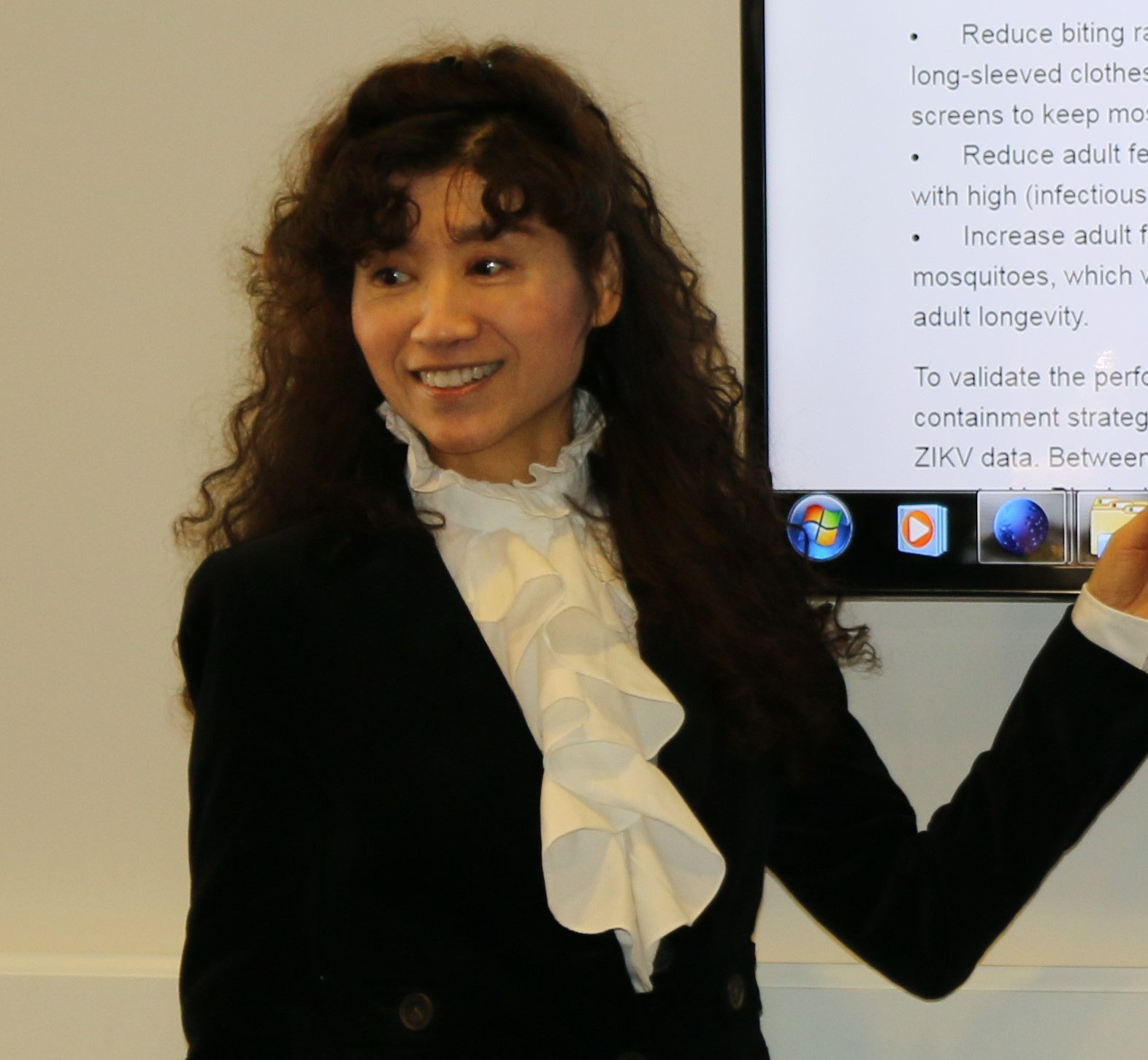
- Education: Hong Kong Baptist University, Rice University
- Awards: Fellow of the American Institute for Medical and Biological Engineering (2019); Fellow of Institute for Operations Research and the Management Sciences (2015); Daniel H. Wagner Prize for Excellence in the Practice (2015); Franz Edelman Award for Achievement in Advanced Analytics (2007)
- Scientific career
- Fields: Mathematics
- Doctoral advisor: Robert E. Bixby; Martin Grötschel (postdoc)

Eva K Lee is an American applied mathematician and operations researcher who applies combinatorial optimization and systems biology to the study of health care decision making and organizational transformation. She is an analytic member of the Medical and Public Health Information Sharing Environment (MPHISE) system. Since July 2021, Lee has been the chief scientific officer for a private technology company, heading the Center for Operations Research in Medicine and Healthcare and the Center for Operations Research in Homeland Security. Previously she was a professor at the H. Milton Stewart School of Industrial and Systems Engineering of Georgia Institute of Technology. She was also the Founder and Director of Georgia Tech's Center for Operations Research in Medicine and Healthcare from 1999 until June 30, 2021. She was a Distinguished Scholar in Health Systems at, Health System Institute at Georgia Tech and Emory University. Lee was the Virginia C. and Joseph C. Mello Chair from 2017 to 2019.

== Early life and education ==
Eva Lee was born in Hong Kong, the daughter of a wood artist. According to Lee, her mother suffered from a severe form of systemic sclerosis before Lee was born.

Lee graduated with Distinction from Hong Kong Baptist University in 1988 with a bachelor's degree in mathematics. She completed her M.S. and Ph.D. 1993 in computational and applied mathematics at Rice University. Her dissertation, Solving Structured 0/1 Integer Programs Arising from Truck Dispatching Scheduling Problems, was supervised by Robert E. Bixby.

== Career ==
Lee began her academic career as an assistant professor in the department of industrial engineering and operations research at Columbia University as the first female faculty member in 1994. While at Columbia, she took a leave of absence and joined The Zuse Institute Berlin (ZIB) as an NSF/NATO postdoctoral fellow in Scientific Computing in 1995. During her tenure at Columbia, Lee was trained in radiation oncology and medical physics at the Columbia University School of Medicine.

In 1999, Lee was jointly hired by Georgia Institute of Technology and Emory University Department of Radiation Oncology.

She founded the Center for Operations Research in Medicine and Healthcare through funds from the National Science Foundation and the Whitaker Foundation. The center focuses on biomedicine, public health, and defense, advancing domains from basic science to translational medical research; intelligent, quality, and cost-effective delivery; and medical preparedness and protection of critical infrastructures.

Lee's research focuses on mathematical programming, information technology, game theory, networks, machine learning and computational algorithms for risk assessment, decision making, predictive analytics and knowledge discovery, and systems and performance optimization. She has made major contributions to advances to business operations transformation, biomedicine and clinical research, emergency response and disaster preparedness, and healthcare operations. Her homeland security work has focused on risk assessment and protection of critical infrastructures, including healthcare, supply chain and logistics, power plants, communication, and finance.

From 2007 to 2019. Lee served as the CDC-sponsored principal investigator of an online interoperable information exchange and decision support system, RealOpt, for mass dispensing, emergency response, and casualty mitigation. RealOpt incorporates disease spread modeling with response processes and dynamic real-time resource allocation. It offers efficiency and quality assurance in operations and logistics performance. RealOpt includes real-world vaccination models of 2009 H1N1, seasonal influenza, Hepatitis A, and smallpox, for both drive-through and walk-in dispensing.

In 2009–2011, Lee served as a Senior Health Systems Engineer and Professor, for the U.S. Department of Veterans Affairs. Lee provided health delivery systems evaluation and redesign expertise for the VA medical centers and health systems network. This included the area of emergency medicine, surgical service, primary care, dental service, drug and substance abuse, cardiovascular and diabetes work, mental service and care continuity, and fee-based service. Since 2012 Lee has also have been working with military emergency response medical leaders on protecting war fighters’ health and on rapid recovery through machine learning analysis on different types of treatment regimens for personalized treatment. Lee has also worked with VA investigators on issues related to access of care, telemedicine, remote patient monitoring, and personalized medicine particularly related to chronic disease management.

Lee was also the co-director of the Center for Health Organization Transformation, an NSF Industry/University Cooperative Research Center for 10 years. The NSF IUCRC program focuses on “Accelerating Impact through Partnerships”. Congressman John Lewis wrote to Lee when the center was established, commending Lee for providing the “dedication, commitment, and concern” to the community. Working with local hospitals and organizations, Lee focuses on transformation advances that can drive our healthcare delivery that is safe, effective, efficient, timely, equitable and patient-centered.

Some exemplary work from Lee includes the early detection of chronic diseases,, personalized treatment design for cancer, diabetes and other diseases, clinical workflow transformation, patient safety and infection control.

== Biosecurity, radiological/nuclear incidents, and disaster response ==
Lee's work has included collaboration with the Centers for Disease Control and Prevention on defenses against pandemics and biological weapons. The system she developed has decision support capabilities for modeling and optimizing the public health infrastructure for hazardous emergency response]. It is designed for use in biological and radiological preparedness, disease outbreak planning and response, and natural disasters planning. It helps officials plan for dispensing facilities locations, to ensure optimal facility staffing and allocation of resources, including routing of the population and dispensing modalities. It also tracks infra-facility infection. Although Lee received numerous offers from technology companies wanting to buy the program from her and Georgia Tech, she negotiated with the university to make it available free so that any health department could use it.

Lee has contributed some major development in establishing the field of "Systems Vaccinology" and in the understanding of foundations of vaccine mechanism, how to prospectively determine the efficacy of a vaccine in clinical trials. Through machine learning and systems modeling, she was involved in the optimization of influenza vaccines, uncovering how people respond to the vaccines, and vaccine immunogenicity in Yellow Fever, and Malaria. This has critical implications to rapid vaccine design and testing, evaluation, and precision medicine where predictions can be made to determine individuals who are most benefit from vaccine and those who are not, thus protecting individuals against adverse drug effect. Along with the biological experts, the groundbreaking work in yellow fever started an entirely new field of research, now known as “Systems Vaccinology.” Systems Vaccinology is today recognized as one of the most exciting areas of research in vaccine science and immunology, and has been brought to the fore with the COVID-19 crisis, where some one hundred vaccine candidates are being developed.

Lee has served on NAE/NAS/IOM, NRC, NBSB, DTRA panel committees related to biological, radiological, and chemical incidents, medical countermeasures dispensing, public health and medical preparedness, and healthcare systems innovation.

In 2019, Lee was appointed a member of the Gulf War Illness Clinical Case Definition Steering Committee for the U.S. Department of Veterans Affairs.

From 2015 to 2018, Lee served on the National Biodefense Science Board (National Preparedness & Response Science Board). NBSB members are vital to the operations in Department of Health and Human Services. Over the past eight years, the board has helped the Assistant Secretary for Preparedness and Response improve federal policies and practices in disaster preparedness and response.

The NBSB federal advisory committee was created under the Pandemic and All-Hazards Preparedness Act of 2006 and the Public Health Service Act. Since its inception, the board has provided recommendations on federal disaster preparedness and response issues. In the past year, the board has advised on modernizing and enhancing the nation's biosurveillance capabilities and how the department and the nation can increase community health resilience. The board has 13 voting members with a broad range of expertise in science, medicine, and public health.

In 2016, Lee served on the NBSB Public Health Emergency Medical Countermeasures Enterprise (PHEMCE) Committee for Medical Countermeasures Preparedness Assessment Working Group. She also served on The future of the NBSB Working Group from 2016 to 2018.

She served as an expert science consultant on the Food and Drug Administration Center for Devices and Radiological Health from 2014 to 2018.

From 2015 - 2017, Lee was a member of the National Academies of Sciences, Engineering and Medicine "Standing Committee for the Centers for Disease Control and Prevention Division of Strategic National Stockpile." The standing committee served as a venue for the exchange of ideas among federal, state, and local government agencies, the private sector, and the academic community, as well as other relevant stakeholders involved in emergency preparedness and emergency response services.

From 2013 - 2014, Lee served as a member of the National Research Council Committee for "Assessment of Supercritical Water Oxidation System Testing for the Blue Grass Chemical Agent-Destruction Pilot Plant.” The committee was charged to reviews and evaluates the results of the tests conducted on one of the SCWO units to be provided to Blue Grass Chemical Agent Destruction Pilot Plant.

In 2011 - 2012, Lee was involved in a classified study for Defense Threat Reduction Agency DTRA-DSRC Study on "R&D Strategy for Defending Against Chemical Agents Performed for Defense Threat Reduction Agency."

From 2008 to 2010, Lee served on the Institute of Medicine and National Research Council "Effectiveness of National Biosurveillance Systems: BioWatch and the Public Health System" Panel, charged to evaluate the effectiveness of the Department of Homeland Security's BioWatch program. The study results in a public report that outlines the committee's initial progress. Findings and recommendations are summarized in a classified report. During this period, Lee was also a member of the IOM Medical Countermeasures Dispensing Working Group.

In 2008, Lee served on the National Biodefense Science Board. National Disaster Medicine Systems Assessment Panel, The National Biodefense Science Board was asked to provide feedback to the U.S. Department of Health and Human Services on the review of the National Disaster Medical System and national medical surge capacity as required by the Pandemic and All-Hazards Preparedness Act (PAHPA) and as specified in the Homeland Security Presidential Directive (HSPD)-21.

== COVID-19 and documentary ==
Since January 2020, Lee has been working with federal, state and local leaders on COVID-19 containment and mitigation, strategic testing, timing for non-pharmaceutical intervention, medical and personnel surge, resource allocation, reopening operations logistics, treatment prediction and outcome analysis, and vaccine prioritization and distribution.

The group, called itself "Red Dawn", communicates via lengthy emails. It includes senior officials across the Department of Veterans Affairs, the State Department, the Department of Homeland Security, and the Department of Health and Human Services, as well as outside academics and some state health officials. Kaiser Health News first obtained the correspondence through public records request in King County, Washington, where officials struggled as the virus set upon a nursing home in the Seattle area. It was the scene of the first major outbreak in the nation.

The emails show that Lee voiced serious concerns regarding personal protective equipment supply chain disruption, asymptomatic and post-recovery transmission (from an NEJM online article in January), the importance of public awareness and the roll-out of non-pharmaceutical intervention. In one email, Lee wrote "Diamond Princess shows case the worst form of social gathering. It doesn't matter even though it seems the environment is unnatural. Why would it be so different than a mall with everyone walking around for 3-6 hours, eating, drinking, touching everything? or at school encloses in classrooms for multiple hours? or at work encloses in cubicles for 8 hours long?" By mid-February. Lee was pushing for school closure and business telework. The public learns that Assistant Secretary of Health and Human Services (Preparedness and Response).Dr. Robert Kadlec "and the others decided to present Mr. Trump with a plan titled “Four Steps to Mitigation,” telling the president that they needed to begin preparing Americans for a step rarely taken in United States history."

Lee can be seen in the documentary Totally Under Control, directed and produced by the famed Oscar-winning documentary filmmaker, Alex Gibney, along with Ophelia Harutyunyan, and Suzanne Hillinger. Lee was credited also in the May 3 CNN special, "The Pandemic and the President."

== Honors ==
Lee received the NSF Career young investigator award in 1995. In 1999, she was awarded the Whitaker Foundation Biomedical Research Young Investigator Award on image-guided prostate cancer treatment advances, becoming the first and only person in her field to receive the honor, Her work with CDC and DeKalb Public health on "Emergency treatment response and real-time staff allocation for bioterrorism and infectious disease outbreak" was honored the INFORMS Pierskalla Best Paper Award for research excellence in HealthCare and Management Science in 2005.

With Marco Zaider at the Memorial Sloan-Kettering Cancer Center, Lee was the 2007 winner of the Franz Edelman Award of the Institute for Operations Research and the Management Sciences (INFORMS). Their work "Operations Research Answers to Cancer Therapeutics" improves the survival rate of patients with prostate cancer, reduces the side effects of treatment, and reduces costs to the health care system. It was the first time that the association awarded the Edelman prize for medical treatment. The Memorial Sloan team went on to receive the 2012 INFORMS Impact Prize for their use of operations research and analytics throughout the center and particularly in treating prostate cancer.

Lee is also part of the team of investigators for the work "Systems Biology of Seasonal Influenza Vaccinations in Humans" who won the 2011 International Society of Vaccines Paper of the Year.

She was elected to the 2015 class of fellows of INFORMS, for exceptional accomplishments in OR methodologies and to OR practice in medicine, healthcare, and emergency preparedness, with successful implementations and broad impact. And in the same year her team (Georgia Tech, Emory, CDC) won the INFORMS Daniel H. Wagner Prize for Excellence in Operations Research Practice for their work on machine learning in vaccine immunogenicity prediction. She was listed as finalist in many other years.

Lee, along with Brent Egan of the American Medical Association, was named the first runner-up for their work on "Machine Learning: Multi-site Evidence-based Best Practice Discovery" for the 2019 Innovative Applications in Analytics Award. The study establishes interoperability among electronic medical records from 737 healthcare sites and performs machine learning for best practice discovery.

Lee was profiled as Women of O.R. in February 2019. She was inducted into the College of Fellow of the American Institute for Medical and Biological Engineering in 2019 for contributions in novel cancer therapeutics, vaccine immunogenicity prediction, and public health emergency preparedness with successful implementation and broad impact.

== Personal ==
Lee was a co-director for the multi-university NSF I/UCRC Center for Health Organization Transformation for 10 years. The grant from NSF ($40,000 per year) was leveraged to build strong collaborative relationships with Atlanta healthcare centers and hospitals (members). Members provided students with first-hand clinical experience where students learned directly on-site, worked alongside nurses and physicians, observed surgeries in the operating room, documented treatment processes and patient care in the emergency department, and the intensive care units, etc.

According to the NSF site and court documents, "Multi-university Phase II and Phase III sites must have a minimum of $175,000 in cash membership fees and a minimum of three full members. After the first year of Phase II or Phase III, each site must show $175,000 minimum annually in membership fees including in-kind contributions. In-kind contributions considered to be part of the $175,000 must be approved by the Industrial Advisory Board (IAB)."

Lee's hospital members paid $50,000 cash to Georgia Tech in Phase II Year 1 as a membership fee. They also paid for background screening, drug tests, parking, and in some cases monthly liability insurance, and provided IDs for all participating students each year. Lee counted membership according to the NSF criteria: she counted the cash hospitals paid for in their partnership collaboration. The members also provided in-kind contributions, including hospital access, patient data, and HIPAA training that helped shape students' intellectual growth and career preparation. The Georgia Tech team had access to over 2.7 million patients' data.

The contribution of members helped train over 100 students with over 50% female students. Members worked with Lee and students on important hospital projects where evidence-based health transformation was carried out. Students gained hands-on experience with big-data analytics and successful implementation experiences. Lee also sponsored 400 under-served K8-12 students on campus (> 50% female, 97% African American and Latina) to introduce them to center research, offer hands-on learning to gain insight into college life and STEM research experience.

The NSF Office of Inspector General disagreed with the counting of membership. They considered only cash flow into Georgia Tech as membership fee.

On September 18, 2019, the NSF General Council issued a final Notice of Administrative Action regarding the NSF Office of the Inspector General Report of Investigation. The U.S. Attorney's office refused to drop charges.

In December 2019, Lee pleaded guilty in U.S. District Court to lying to NSF investigators and submitting a membership certificate with false information. In August 2020, a federal judge gave Lee a lighter sentence than was requested by the prosecution, so that she could continue her work on fighting the COVID-19 pandemic in a timely manner. The 10 months probation included sixty days of staying at home, to start in the spring of 2021.

The case is unusual in multiple aspects: the refusal of U.S. Attorney to dismiss the charges; the repeated denial of Georgia Tech administrators to requests from top U.S. health officials to restore Lee's access to her computers while COVID-19 raged across the country.
