= Avon Cities Jazz Band =

British jazz group

The Avon Cities Jazz Band were a jazz band from Bristol, England, from 1949 to 2000. The band performed jazz standards such as "Cotton Tail" and their own songs.

One example of their compositions is "African Song" from their album Tempo Fugit, which was released in the 1990s. The Avon Cities band were successful in the 1970s and 1980s.

== Members ==
The core members of the band:

- Geoff Nichols – trumpeter and writer of many of pieces
- Mike Hitchings – trombone, soprano saxophone, alto saxophone, and mandolin player, who also wrote somepieces
- Ray Bush – clarinet player who occasionally sang (left in 1984 when he moved to the U.S.)

Other notable members of the band included:

- Chris Pope – drummer from 1964 until 1995
- Frank Feeney – guitarist from 1961 until 1988
- Dave Collett – main pianist from 1963 onward
- Clive Morton – bassist for over 20 years
- Basil Wright – drummer before Chris Pope
- Malcolm Wright – bass player (brother of Basil)
- Jan Ridd – pianist in the late 1950s
- Wayne Chandler – banjo and guitar player in the late 1950s
- Martin Genge – saxophone player from the 1980s onward
- Frank Woodford – drummer from 1995 onward

Geoff Nichols and Mike Hitchings never left the band, playing from 1949 until 2000. In 1952, Nichols, Hitchings, Bush, and Wright formed the Avon Cities Skiffle Group.

== Avon Cities Skiffle Group ==
Avon Cities Skiffle Group featuring Ray Bush were founded in Bristol, England, during 1952 by members of the Jazz Band. The group became a part of the skiffle craze that swept the UK in 1957 and made several recordings and appeared on BBC Light Programme shows. Their big hit was named "Green Corn", originally by Lead Belly, an American blues singer and twelve-string guitar player. The Skiffle Group stopped playing skiffle in the mid-1960s, continuing to play jazz for the Jazz Band.

=== Group ===
- Ray Bush - vocals
- Mike Hitchins - mandolin
- Geoff Nichols - bass
- Wayne Chandler - banjo
- Basil Wright - drums
