= Ernie Collett =

Ernie Collett may refer to:

- Ernie Collett (footballer) (1914–1980), English football player and coach for Arsenal
- Ernie Collett (ice hockey) (1895–1951), Canadian ice hockey player who played at the 1924 Winter Olympics
