= Colette Pechekhonova =

Russian model (born 1980)

- Born: Kolett Pechekhonova; March 12, 1980 (age 46); Leningrad, USSR (now Saint Petersburg, Russia)
- Modeling information
- Height: 5 ft 10.5 in (1.79 m)
- Hair color: Blonde
- Eye color: Blue
- Agency: One Management

Colette Pechekhonova (born 12 March 1980) is a Russian model.

== Early life ==
Pechekhonova was born on 12 March 1980, in Leningrad, now Saint Petersburg. She was a student of ballet from a young age. While in college studying medicine, she sent pictures of herself to various agencies. The owner of one of them, Cros Coitton of Parisian agency Nathalie Models, noticed her photo and signed her almost immediately.

== Career ==
Pechekhonova's debut into the fashion world was at the Spring/Summer 1999 Fendi show. She walked a total of 40 shows that season, making her an international success. After signing with New York Model Management in 1999, she walked for Calvin Klein as an exclusive. Her career continued until her decision to retire in 2004.

She eventually changed her mind, signing with Nathalie Models once more in 2007. She became a regular favourite with Bottega Veneta. She began booking many editorials as well, posing for magazines like i-D, Vogue, and Velvet.

Since her debut in 1998, she has also walked for Viktor & Rolf, Versace, Christian Dior, Louis Vuitton, Gucci, Alexander McQueen and Givenchy.

== Personal life ==
Pechekhonova made friends with other models like Anouck Lepère, Iris Strubegger, and Eugenia Volodina. She is interested in cinema.
