= The Collett School =

Community special school in Hertfordshire, England

Location
- Lockers Park Lane; Hemel Hempstead, Hertfordshire, HP1 1TQ; England; 51°45′25″N 00°28′51″W

Information
- Type: Community special school
- Established: 1964
- Local authority: Hertfordshire County Council
- Department for Education URN: 117672 Tables
- Ofsted: Reports
- Head of school: Pam Stocks
- Executive headteacher: Stephen Hoult-Allen
- Gender: Mixed
- Age range: 4–16
- Enrolment: 121 (2018)
- Website: www.collett.herts.sch.uk

The Collett School is a 4–16 mixed community special school in Hemel Hempstead, Hertfordshire, England, that was established in 1964.
