= William Collett =

English cricketer

Personal information
- Full name: William Eustace Collett
- Born: 23 September 1839; Lambeth, Surrey
- Died: 1 May 1904 (aged 64); Lambeth, London (Note: Collett's biographical details are given differently in his Wisden obituary. This has him born at Lambeth on 23 September 1841 and dying at Kennington on 2 May 1904.)
- Batting: Right-handed
- Bowling: Right-arm fast

Domestic team information
- Years: Team
- 1869–1874: Surrey
- Source: Cricinfo, 12 March 2017

William Eustace Collett (23 September 1839 – 1 May 1904) was an English cricketer. He played four first-class matches for Surrey County Cricket Club between 1869 and 1874.

Collett was born at Lambeth, at that point still part of Surrey. Professionally a proctor's clerk, He married Hannah London in 1859; the couple had nine children.

Described by Wisden as "a good average batsmen" who "could bowl fast round-armed" and who usually fielded at long stop or mid-off, Collett made his first-class debut for Surrey in a July 1869 match against Lancashire at The Oval. He made scores of three and one during the match, but was retained in the side for the following two matches, playing against Nottinghamshire later in July and Yorkshire in early August. He made his highest first-class score, 19 runs, against Nottinghamshire. Collett's final first-class match was an 1874 fixture against Cambridge University at Fenner's. In his four appearances for Surrey he scored a total of 44 runs; he did not bowl.

Collett died at Lambeth in May 1904. He was aged 64.
