= Colette Justine =

Tunisian-American multimedia artist

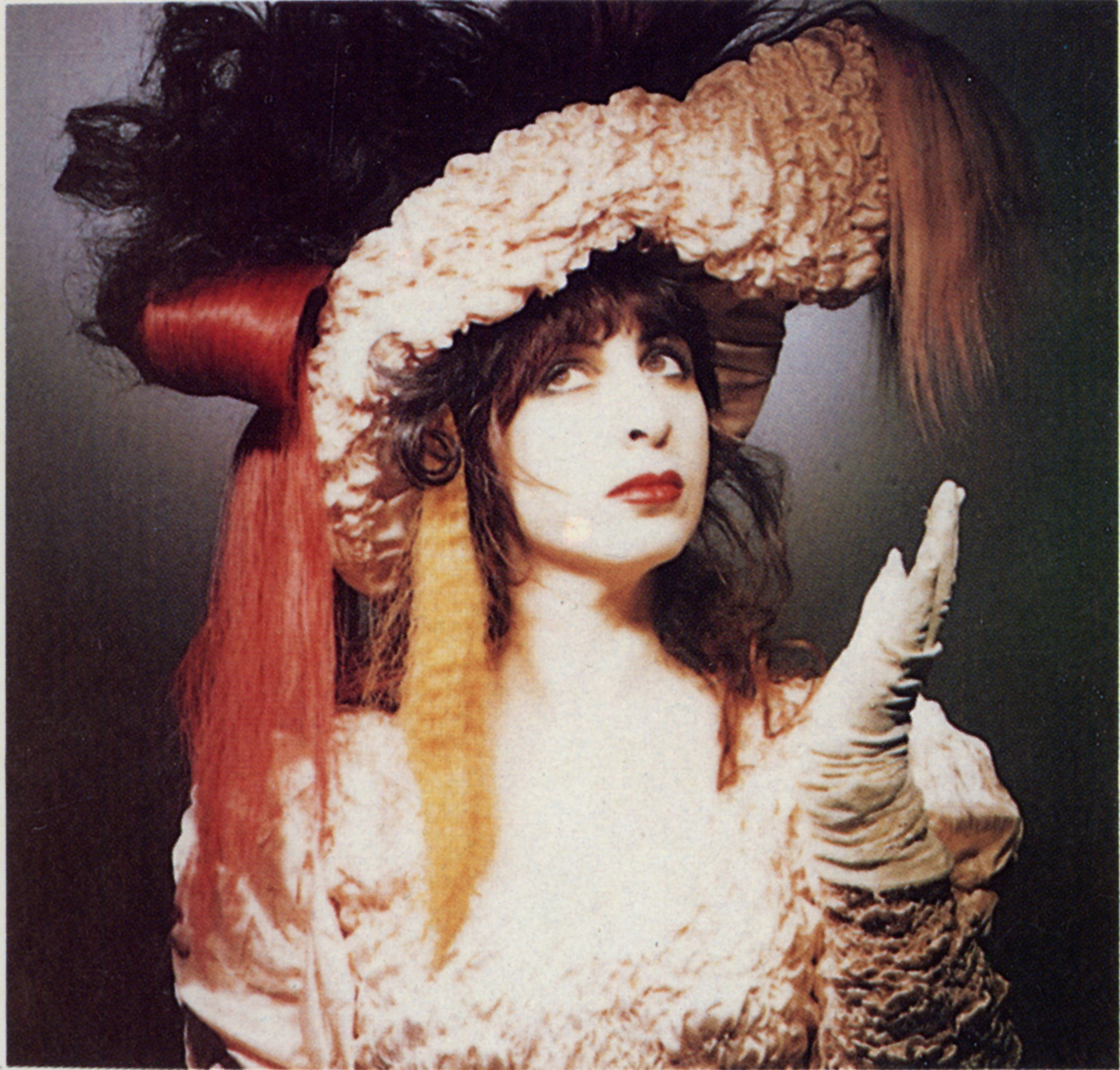
- self-portrait
- Born: Tunis, Tunisia
- Other name: Colette Lumiere
- Known for: Multi Media, Installation Performance, Street Art, Conceptual art, Painting, Photography
- Awards: Guggenheim 2016, Daad Grant 1984

Colette Justine, better known as Colette Lumiere, is a Tunisian-American multimedia artist. Since the 1970s, her career has spanned performance art, street art, and photographic tableau vivant. She is also known for her work exploring male and female gender roles, use of guises and personas, and for soft fabric environments, where she often appears as the central element.
