= Théo Colette =

Belgian footballer (1927–2022)

Personal information
- Date of birth: 6 November 1927
- Date of death: 28 January 2022 (aged 94)

International career
Years	Team	Apps	(Gls)
1957	Belgium	2	(0)

Théo Colette (6 November 1927 – 28 January 2022) was a Belgian footballer. He played in two matches for the Belgium national football team in 1957.

Colette died on 28 January 2022, at the age of 94.
