= Gabrielle Bernstein =

American professional speaker, author

- Education: Syracuse University
- Occupations: Author; Motivational speaker Podcast Host
- Years active: 2006–present
- Spouse: Zach Rocklin
- Website: gabbybernstein.com

Gabrielle Bernstein on Bookbits radio

Gabrielle Bernstein is an American author, motivational speaker, and podcast host.

== Early life and education ==
Bernstein grew up in Larchmont, New York where she attended a Jewish summer camp and led a youth group. In 2001, she graduated from Syracuse University where she studied theatre.

== Career ==
Bernstein is the author of nine books, including The Universe Has Your Back, Super Attractor, and Happy Days. Bernstein teaches primarily from the text A Course In Miracles.

== Personal life ==
Bernstein had a child with husband Zach Rocklin in December 2018.

== Works ==
- Add More ~ing To Your Life: A Hip Guide To Happiness (2010)
- MediDating: Meditations for Fearless Romance (2011)
- Spirit Junkie: A Radical Road to Discovering Self-Love and Miracles (2011) ISBN 978-0307887429
- May Cause Miracles: A 6-Week Kick-Start to Unlimited Happiness (2013) ISBN 978-0307986955
- Miracles Now: 108 Life-Changing Tools for Less Stress, More Flow, and Finding Your True Purpose (2014) ISBN 978-1401944339
- The Universe Has Your Back: Transform Fear to Faith (2016) ISBN 978-1401946555
- Judgment Detox: Release the Beliefs that Hold you Back from Living a Better Life (2018) ISBN 978-1501168987
- Super Attractor: Methods for Manifesting a Life beyond Your Wildest Dreams (2019) ISBN 978-1401957162
- You Are the Guru: 6 Messages to Help You Move Through Difficult Times with Certainty and Faith (2020)
- Happy days: the guided path from trauma to profound freedom and inner peace (2022)
