= Muzha =

Muzha may refer to:

- Muzha District, former district in Taipei
- Muzha Line, medium-capacity line in Taipei, Taiwan
  - Muzha station, an MRT station of Taipei Metro
- Muzha (mythology), a Chinese deity
