= Four Saints of Nine Dragons Island =

Characters in Investiture of the Gods

The Four Saints of Nine Dragon Island (Chinese: 九龙岛四圣; pinyin: Jiǔlóng Dǎo Sì Shèng) are four characters in the Chinese novel Investiture of the Gods (Fengshen Yanyi): Wang Mo (王魔), Yang Sen (杨森), Gao Youqian (高友乾), and Li Xingba (李兴霸). They are Daoist practitioners who live on Jiulong Island and are associated with the Jiejiao in the novel. Wen Zhong recruits them to assist the Shang forces in their campaign against King Wu and Jiang Ziya. In later traditions, the Four Saints are worshipped as Dharma Protectors in some Chinese temples.

== In Fengshen Yanyi ==
=== Battle at Xiqi ===
The four first appear together in chapter 38, when Wen Zhong visits Jiulong Island to seek their help against the forces of Zhou. The novel identifies them as Wang Mo, Yang Sen, Gao Youqian, and Li Xingba and describes them as the "Four Generals of Lingxiao Hall" (灵霄殿四将). They agree to accompany Wen Zhong and fight for the Shang dynasty. The Four Saints travel to Xiqi after being recruited by Wen Zhong. Their mounts are the mythical beasts Bian (狴犴), Suanni (狻猊), a spotted leopard (花斑豹), and Zhengning (狰狞), respectively. The beasts frighten the horses of the Zhou army, giving the four an advantage in battle.

Wang Mo demands that King Wu submit to Shang authority and that Jiang Ziya agree to several conditions. Jiang Ziya refuses, and fighting breaks out between the two sides.

In chapter 39, Wang Mo pursues Jiang Ziya but is killed by Jinzha with his sword. The following day, Gao Youqian is killed by Jiang Ziya with the God-Beating Whip, while Yang Sen is killed by Jinzha. Li Xingba escapes from the battlefield and later encounters Muzha, who kills him with the Wugou swords.

=== Investiture ===
After their deaths, the four are included among the spirits to be enshrined by Jiang Ziya. In chapter 99, Jiang Ziya reads a decree stating that Wang Mo, Yang Sen, Gao Youqian (listed there as Gao Tigan, 高体乾), and Li Xingba had cultivated on Jiulong Island but had failed to attain the higher stages of spiritual cultivation. They are therefore appointed as the Four Saints Grand Marshals Guarding Lingxiao Palace (镇守灵霄宝殿四圣大元帅).

== Characters ==
=== Wang Mo ===
Wang Mo (Chinese: 王魔; pinyin: Wáng Mó) is the first of the Four Saints introduced in the novel. He wears a headcloth and a blue robe and has a round face. His mount is the mythical beast Bian (狴犴), and he uses the Ka Tian Pearl (开天珠).

Wang Mo fights Jiang Ziya during the battle at Xiqi and later pursues him after Jiang Ziya is wounded. He is killed by Jinzha at Wulong Mountain.

=== Yang Sen ===
Yang Sen (Chinese: 楊森; pinyin: Yáng Sēn) is the second of the Four Saints. The novel describes him as wearing black clothing, with a dark complexion, reddish beard, and yellow eyebrows. His mount is the Suanni (狻猊).

After Wang Mo is killed, Yang Sen and the other two Saints attack Jiang Ziya. Yang Sen is restrained by Jinzha's Dunlongzhuang and killed with a sword.

=== Gao Youqian ===
Gao Youqian (Chinese: 高友乾; pinyin: Gāo Yǒuqián), also recorded as Gao Tigan (高体乾) in the investiture decree, is the third of the Four Saints. He has a blue complexion, red hair, and protruding teeth and wears a red robe. His mount is a spotted leopard, and his magical weapon is the Hunyuan Pearl (混元珠).

During the battle at Xiqi, Gao Youqian attacks Jiang Ziya and his allies. Jiang Ziya kills him with the God-Beating Whip.

=== Li Xingba ===
Li Xingba (Chinese: 李興霸; pinyin: Lǐ Xīngbà) is the fourth of the Four Saints. He wears a golden fish-tail crown and a yellow robe and has a reddish complexion and a long beard. His mount is the mythical beast Zhengning (狰狞).

After Wang Mo, Yang Sen, and Gao Youqian are killed, Li Xingba retreats from the battle. He later encounters Muzha, a disciple of Puxian Zhenren, at Jiugong Mountain. Muzha kills him with the Wugou swords (吴钩剑).

== Worship ==
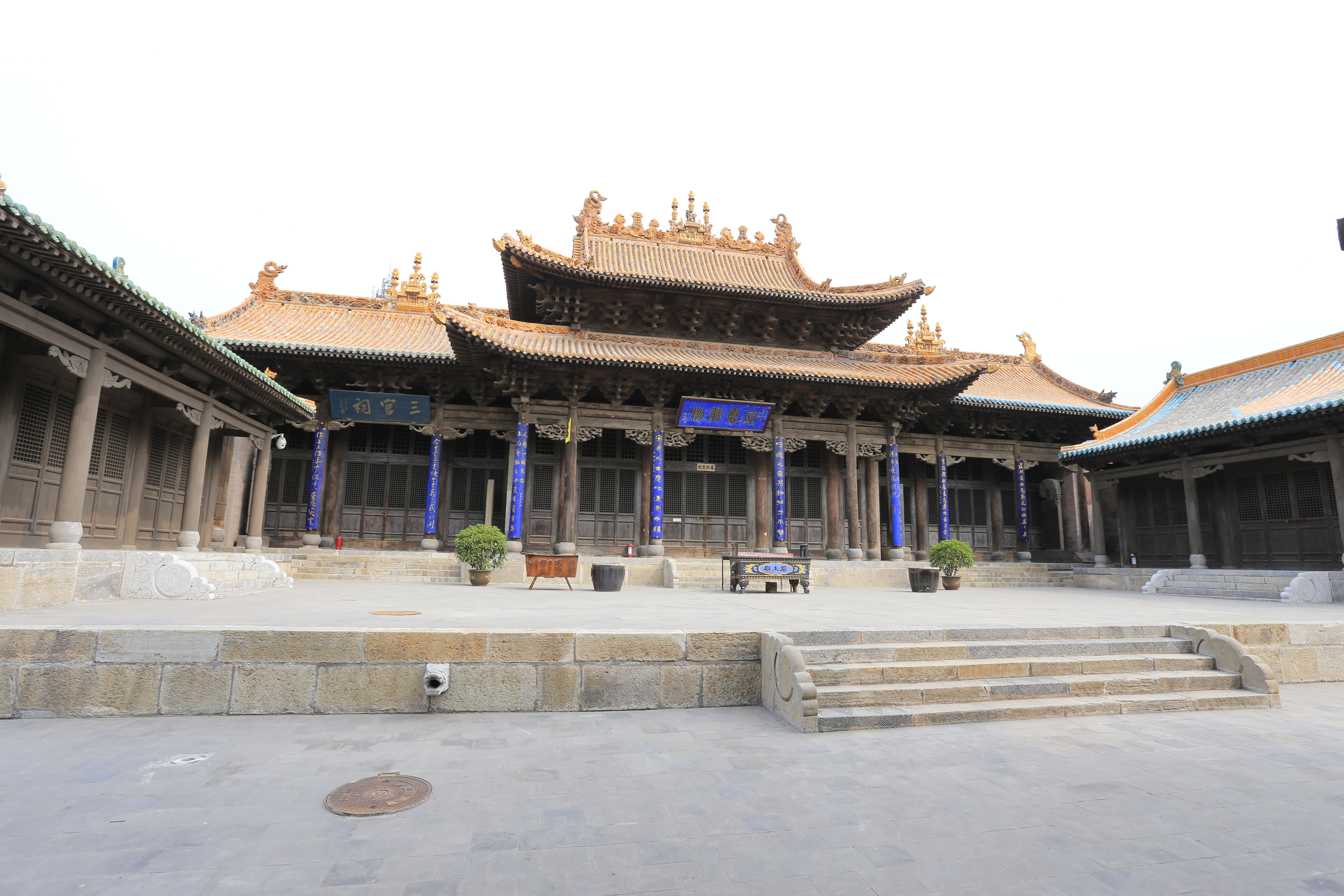
The Houtu Temple in Jiexiu, where the Four Saints are enshrined as Dharma Protectors.

The Four Saints are worshipped as Dharma Protectors at the Houtu Temple in Jiexiu, Shanxi. The temple's Hall of Dharma Protectors contains statues of Wang Mo, Yang Sen, Gao Youqian, and Li Xingba.
