= Letty =

Letty, Lettie, Letti or Lety as a female given name is a shortening of Leticia (and its variants), Violet or Colette. It may refer to:

== People ==
=== Given name ===
Letty

- Letty Alonzo (1929−2020), Filipina actress
- Letty Aronson (born 1943), American film producer
- Letty Brown, New Zealand Māori community leader
- Letty Eisenhauer (born 1935), American pop artist and Fluxus performer
- Letty Jimenez Magsanoc (1941–2015), Filipino journalist and editor
- Letty Katts (1919–2007), Australian songwriter
- Letty Lind (1861−1923), English actress
- Letty Murray, Mexican model
- Melita "Letty" Norwood (1912–2005), British civil servant and KGB spy
- Letty Cottin Pogrebin (born 1939), American writer and journalist
- Letty Quintero (born 1985), Ecuadorian footballer
- Letty M. Russell (1929−2007), American feminist theologian
- Letty M. Wickliffe (1902–2001), American educator

Lettie

- Lettie (musician), English musician
- Lettie Allen (1901–1980), New Zealand feminist and politician
- Lettie Alston (born 1953), American composer
- Lettie S. Bigelow (1849−1906), American author
- Lettie D. Campbell, American politician
- Lettie Cowman (1870–1960), American writer and author
- Lettie Pate Whitehead Evans (1872–1953), American businesswoman and philanthropist
- Lettie Hamlet Rogers (1917−1957), American writer
- Lettie A. Smith (1816–1912), American inventor and doctor
- Lettie Teague, American author and wine columnist
- Lettie Viljoen, pseudonym of South African writer Ingrid Winterbach

Lety

- Lety López, Mexican actress and singer

=== Surname ===
- Cythna Letty (1895–1985), South African botanical artist

== In fiction ==
- Letty, a character in the 1928 film The Wind, played by Lillian Gish
- Letty, a character in the 1977 novel Quartet in Autumn
- Letty, a character in the play Da Kink in My Hair and the Canadian TV series of the same name
- Letty, a 1980 novel by American writer Clare Darcy
- Letty, a character in the 1917 musical Maytime
- Letty, a character in the 1919 film Gun Law
- Letty Bell, a character in the radio and TV series Little Britain
- Letty Carrington, a character in the 1915 film The Lily and the Rose
- Letty Edwards, a character in the 1990s British TV series Games World
- the title character of Letty Fox: Her Luck, a novel by Australian writer Christina Stead
- Letty Gaunt, a character in the 1970s TV series The Onedin Line
- Dr. Letty Jordan, a character in the 2000s American TV series Presidio Med
- Letty Ketterley, a character in The Chronicles of Narnia series
- Lettie Lutz, a character in the 2017 film The Greatest Showman
- the title character of the 1932 film Letty Lynton
- Letty Ortiz, a character in the 2001 film The Fast and the Furious
- Letty Pace, a character in the 1933 film Jennie Gerhardt, played by Mary Astor
- Lettie Mae Thornton, a character in the 2008–2014 TV series True Blood
- Letty Whiterock, a character in Perfect Cherry Blossom from the Touhou Project series
- Lety, a character in La Fea Más Bella, a Mexican telenovela (soap opera)
- Lettie Hatter, a character in Howl's Moving Castle, a novel by Diana Wynne Jones

== See also ==
- Letty Green, United Kingdom
- Laetitia (given name)
- Leticia (disambiguation)
- Letitia
- Lotty
- Tish
