= Laetitia =

Laetitia may refer to:

== Mythology and religion ==
- Laetitia (goddess), a minor Roman goddess of gaiety
- One of the 16 geomantic figures, primary symbols used in divinatory geomancy

== Other uses ==
- Laetitia (given name)
- 39 Laetitia, an asteroid
- "Laetitia", a song by the German music project E Nomine from the album Die Prophezeiung
- Laetitia, a French miniseries by Jean-Xavier de Lestrade

== See also ==
- Leticia (disambiguation)
- Letitia
