= C6 =

C6, C06, C VI or C-6 may refer to:

== Vehicles ==
=== Road ===
- Chevrolet Corvette C6, a 2005 sports car
- Cierva C.6, a 1924 Spanish autogyro
- Citroën C6, a 2005 executive car
- Sauber SHS C6, a 1982 Group C prototype racing car
- Ford C6 transmission, a heavy-duty automatic transmission built by Ford Motor Company

=== Air ===
- AEG C.VI, a German World War I reconnaissance aircraft
- DFW C.VI, a 1916 German reconnaissance aircraft
- LVG C.VI, a 1917 German twin-seat reconnaissance aircraft
- C-6 Ute, a military version of the Beechcraft King Air airplane

=== Rail ===
- Bavarian C VI, an 1899 German steam locomotive model
- LNER Class C6, a class of British 3-cylinder compound locomotives

=== Water ===
- C-6, United States Army designation of the Sikorsky S-38 amphibious flying boat
- HMS C6, a 1906 British Royal Navy submarine
- Spanish submarine C-6, a Spanish Navy submarine
- USS Olympia (C-6), an 1892 United States Navy protected cruiser

== Anatomy and medicine ==
- Complement component 6 (C6 protein) in the complement cascade system of immune proteins (native immunity)
- Cervical vertebra 6, one of the cervical vertebrae of the vertebral column
- Cervical spinal nerve 6 (C6), a spinal nerve of the cervical segment

== Other uses ==
- C6 (explosive), a form of plastic explosive
- C6 (group), a currency swap agreement between the six largest central banks in the world
- C-6 Canal, a canal that flows from Lake Okeechobee in Florida to its terminus at the Miami River
- C6 connector, an electrical power connector
- C6 tuning, a common tuning of a steel guitar
- Cyclo[6]carbon, a chemical compound with molecular formula C_{6}
- CanJet (IATA code C6), former air carrier
- Celebrity Number Six, a solved lost media mystery
- Circumferential Road 6 or C-6, an arterial road of Manila, Philippines
- Soprano C, a musical note designated C_{6}
- C6 GPMG, Canadian designation of the FN MAG machine gun

== See also ==
- 6C (disambiguation)
- CSIX (disambiguation)
- CVI (disambiguation)
- Nokia C6 (disambiguation), a series of Nokia smartphones
- Oral cancer, ICD-10 codes C00-C08
- Paper size § C series
