= The Ape and the Dolphin =

Aesop's fable

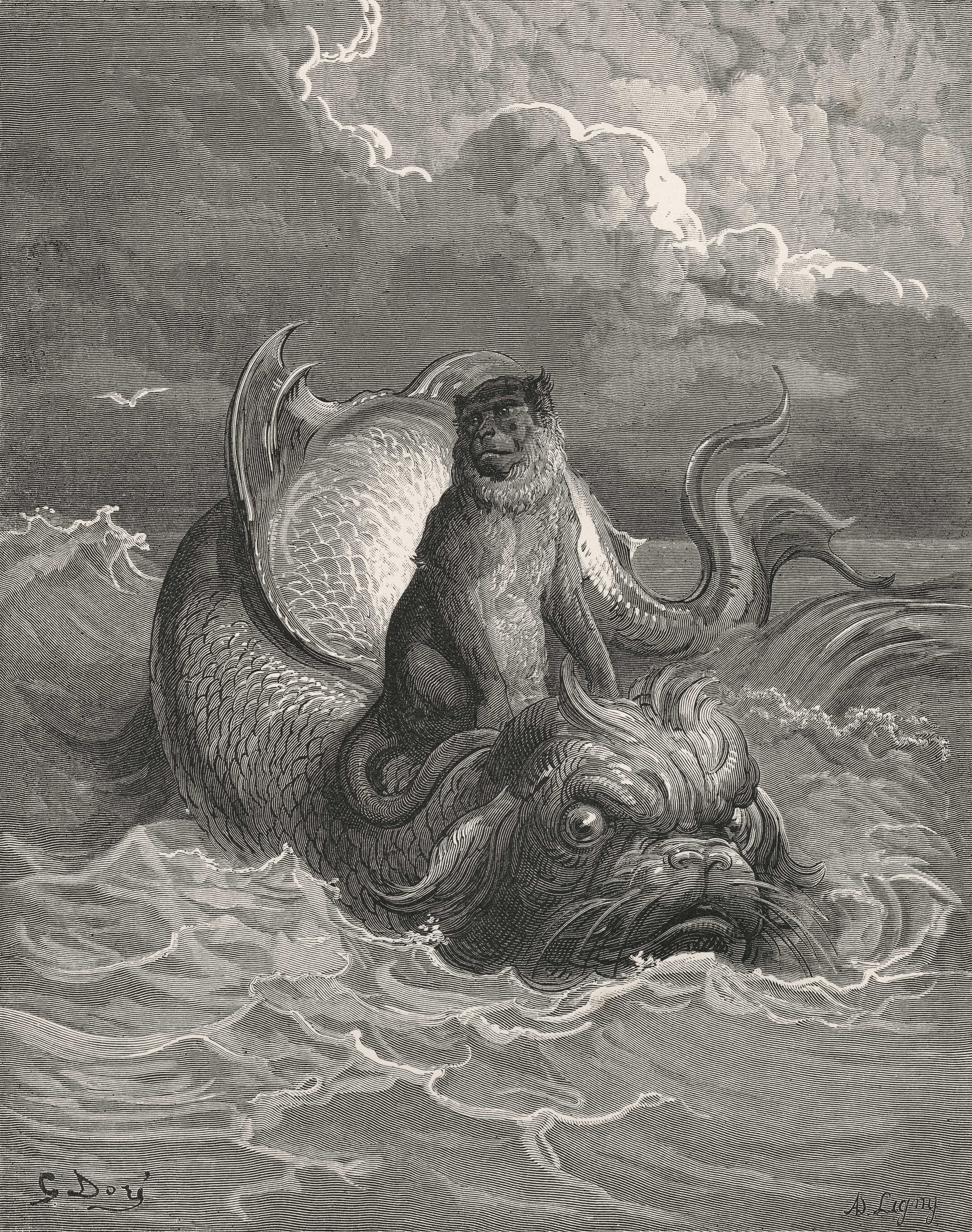
Gustave Doré's 1867 print of the ape astride a sea monster

The Ape (or monkey) and the Dolphin is one of Aesop's Fables and is numbered 73 in the Perry Index. Due to its appearance among La Fontaine's Fables, it has always been popular in France, but in Britain treatment of the story was rarer until the 19th century.

== The fable ==
Following a shipwreck off the Greek coast, a pet monkey belonging to a mariner is rescued from drowning by a dolphin. On being asked whether he is from Athens, the monkey boasts that he belongs to one of the city's foremost families. The dolphin then enquires whether he has visited Piraeus (the Athenian seaport), but the monkey thinks that a person is meant and replies that they are the best of friends. Taking a closer look at his passenger, the dolphin realises that he has not rescued a human being and swims off, leaving the monkey to his fate. The fable closes with the assurance that the story is suitable for liars.

Latin versions of the fable began with the explanation that it was a maritime custom to take along pet animals during voyages, and their example was followed during the Renaissance by Gabriele Faerno in "Simius et Delphus", the poem he composed for his very popular collection Fabulae Centum (1563). He was followed afterwards in French by Jean de La Fontaine, who included the story among his Fables (1668) under the title "Le singe et le dauphin", with the added observation that according to the natural historian Pliny the Elder dolphins are friendly to the human species.

== The fable in Britain ==
Prose accounts of the fable began appearing soon afterwards in Britain, including in the Mythologia Ethica (1689) of Philip Ayres, who also repeats Pliny's observation and titles the story "The Ape and the Dolphin". So did Roger L'Estrange in his collection of Aesop's fables a few years later, concluding at the end of his reflexion on the story that "we have Apes in History, as well as in Fiction, and not a Rush matter whether they go on Four Legs, or on Two". The grammarian Louis Chambaud goes further in his Fables choisies: a l'usage des enfans, et des autres personnes (1692), concluding his own relation of the fable by asking whether drowning would not be a suitable end for human liars too.

The fable was ignored by the main fable collections of the 18th century but appeared in the curiously titled Aesop Unveiled, Or, The Beauties of Deformity: Being a Poetical Translation of Several Curious Fables Out of Aesop and Other Approv'd Mythologists Equally as Diverting and Beneficial to the English Reader as His Comic Shape and Instructive Morals Were to the Ancients (1731). The story is treated with jogtrot joviality and concludes with the moral:

Deceivers are oftentimes left in the briars
For none are so odious to all men as liars.

Several more amateur poets retold the fable of the ape and the dolphin in the next century and, though they did not always acknowledge their source as La Fontaine, its provenance is witnessed by the detail of the dolphin's friendship for man being on Pliny's authority. These versions were to be found both in books, as in the case of John Lettice and Elizabeth Pipe Wolferstan, or as anonymous submissions to such transient periodicals as The Yorkshireman and The illustrated sailors' magazine, and new nautical miscellany. George Hardinge, on the other hand, in his poem "The Monkey and the Dolphin", gave the ape a leisurely treatment of some 56 lines as the teller of very tall stories.

In later years, the fable was included in methodical prose accounts, gathered "chiefly from original sources", such as those by the clergyman Thomas James, George Fyler Townsend, and Vernon Jones. All of these gave it the title "The Monkey and the Dolphin", as did the anonymous American editor of Aesop for Children (Chicago, 1919). The text from this was used much later by Dev Virahsawmy to accompany his adaptation of the fable into Mauritian Creole as Zistwar Zako ek Dofen.

== Artistic treatments ==
The fable's appearance among La Fontaine's fables led to its being included in The labyrinth of Versailles during the 1670s. The 34th sculpture there is ascribed to Georges Sibrayque and once featured a dolphin from whose mouth a fountain jets while the gesturing ape rides on its back. A later park sculpture of the fable, now in the Strasbourg Museum of Modern and Contemporary Art, was carved in polished sandstone by Jean-Désiré Ringel d'Illzach in 1903. Various pictorial artists have also illustrated the fable, among whom were Gustave Doré and Gustave Moreau.
