= Laetitia (given name) =

Laetitia (English) also Laëtitia (French) and Lætitia (Latin), is a girl's name that is quite popular in the south of France and is also used in Québec. It is originally a Latin name Lætitia. The Latin grapheme "æ" is increasingly replaced in France with "aë" but the name is pronounced the same.

Laetitia (goddess), a minor Roman goddess of joy.

Saint Leticia (Latin: Lætitia) is a Roman Catholic saint and virgin martyr.

== People ==
- Laetitia Agab (born 1985), Algerian footballer
- Laetitia Beck (born 1992), Israeli golfer
- Laetitia Casta (born 1978), French model and actress
- Laetitia Chapeh, Equatoguinean football player
- Laetitia Darche (born 1991), Belgian-Mauritian beauty pageant contestant and former Miss Mauritius
- Laetitia d'Arenberg (born 1941), Uruguayan businesswoman
- Laetitia Denis (born 1988), French heptathlete
- Laetitia Griffith (born 1965), Dutch Member of Parliament for the liberal People's Party for Freedom and Democracy
- Laëtitia Hubert (born 1974), French figure skater
- Laetitia Kamba (born 1987), French basketball player
- Laëtitia Le Corguillé (born 1986), French BMX racer
- Laetitia Corbin Lee (1657–1706), American colonist
- Laetitia Lee (1731–1776), Colonial American socialite
- Laëtitia Madjene (born 1986), French kickboxer
- Laetitia Maria of Belgium (born 2003), Belgian princess, daughter of Princess Astrid and Prince Lorenz
- Laetitia Masson (born 1966), French film director and screenwriter
- Laetitia Meignan (born 1960), French judoka
- Laëtitia Philippe (born 1991), French football player
- Laëtitia Roux (born 1985), French ski mountaineer
- Lætitia Sadier (born 1968), French musician, member of the bands Stereolab and Monade
- Laetitia Sonami (born 1957), French composer
- Laëtitia Tonazzi (born 1981), French football player
- Laetitia Rispel, South African professor of Public Health

== Fictional characters ==
- Miss Laetitia Blacklock, in Agatha Christie's novel A Murder Is Announced
- Laetitia Grinder, in Arthur Sullivan's 1875 short opera The Zoo
- Miss Lætitia Prism, in Oscar Wilde's play The Importance of Being Earnest
- Laetitia, in the anime series Madlax
- Laetitia, in Project Moon's video game Lobotomy Corporation and Library of Ruina

== See also ==
- Letitia
- Lettice
- Leticia (disambiguation)
