= Lettice =

Lettice is both a given name and a surname. It is medieval vernacular form of Letitia, meaning "joy, gladness". Notable people with the name include:

== Given name ==
- Lettice Boyle, wife of George Goring, Lord Goring
- Lettice Bryan (1805–1877), American author
- Lettice Cooper (1897–1994), English writer
- Lettice Curtis (1915–2014), English woman aviator, flight test engineer, air racing pilot and sportswoman
- Lettice Digby, 1st Baroness Offaly (1580–1658), Irish peeress and landowner
- Lettice Digby (scientist) (1877–1972), British cytologist, botanist and malacologist
- Lettice D'Oyly Walters (1880–1940), English writer
- Lettice Fisher (1875–1956), English economist and historian
- Lettice Jowitt (1878–1962), English Quaker educationalist
- Lettice Knollys (1543–1634), mother of Robert Devereux, 2nd Earl of Essex, Queen Elizabeth I's courtier
- Lettice Lee (1731–1776), Colonial American society hostess
- Lady Lettice Lygon (1906–1973), English socialite and aristocrat who was one of the Bright Young Things.
- Lettice Mary Tredway (1595–1677), English abbess
- Lettice Paget, Baroness Paget (1583–1655), English noblewoman born to Sir Henry Knollys and Margaret Cave, wife of William Paget, 4th Baron Paget
- Lettice Ramsey (1898–1985), English photographer
- Lettice Sandford (1902–1993), draftsman, wood-engraver, corn dolly revivalist and watercolourist from Herefordshire

== Surname ==
- John Lettice (1737–1832), English clergyman, translator, academic, and author

== Fictional characters ==
- Lettice Protheroe, a character in Agatha Christie's novel The Murder at the Vicarage
- Lettice the Mercy, a tomb-colonist in the game Fallen London
- Lady Lettice Liskeard, a character in Howard Spring's novel Fame is the Spur (novel)

== See also ==
- Lettice and Lovage, a 1987 comedic play by Peter Shaffer
- Lettuce (disambiguation)
- Laetitia (given name), (also Letitia) female given name sometimes shortened to Lettice
