= 1763 in Great Britain =

Events from the year 1763 in Great Britain.

== Incumbents ==
- Monarch – George III
- Prime Minister – John Stuart, 3rd Earl of Bute (Tory) (until 8 April); George Grenville (Whig) (starting 16 April)

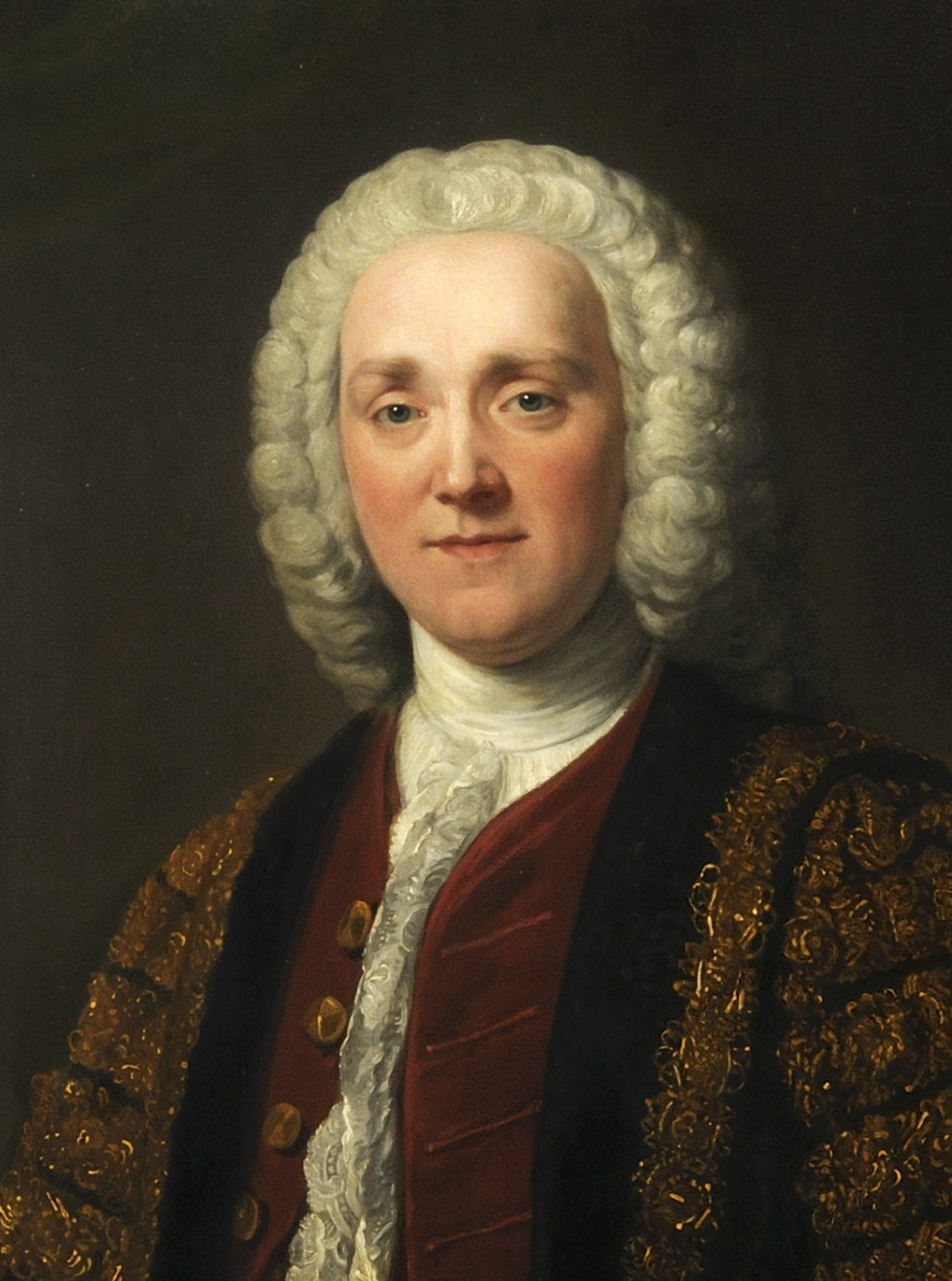
George Grenville

== Events ==
- 10 February – Seven Years' War/French and Indian War: The Treaty of Paris ends the war and France cedes Canada to Great Britain.
- 1 March – Charles Townshend becomes President of the Board of Trade in the British government.
- May – George Grenville becomes Prime Minister following the resignation of the Earl of Bute; he continues to push through Bute's unpopular Cider Bill to impose a tax on the drink.
- 7 May – Outraged by the British success in taking control of land in North America formerly occupied by the French, Pontiac, chief of the Odawa people, begins "Pontiac's War" by attacking the British garrison at Fort Detroit. Although he fails to succeed by surprise on this occasion, two days later he begins the Siege of Fort Detroit.
- 16 May – James Boswell is introduced to Samuel Johnson at Thomas Davies's bookshop in London.
- 2 June – Pontiac's War: At what becomes Mackinaw City, Michigan, Chippewas capture Fort Michilimackinac by diverting the garrison's attention with a game of lacrosse, then chasing a ball into the fort.
- 7 July – the British East India Company declare Mir Qasim, the Nawab of Bengal, to be deposed.
- 2 August – Mir Qasim routed at Odwa Nala.
- 5 August – Pontiac's War: at the Battle of Bushy Run, British forces led by Henry Bouquet defeat American Indians in the Pennsylvania backcountry.
- 7 October – Royal Proclamation of 1763 is made by George III, regulating westward expansion of British North America and stabilizing relations with indigenous peoples of the Americas.
- November – Parliament decides that John Wilkes' article in The North Briton no. 45 of 23 April — criticising George III's April speech in praise of the Treaty of Paris — is a seditious libel.
- 24 November – Thomas Bayes's theorem is first announced (posthumously).

=== Undated ===
- Josiah Wedgwood receives orders for his pottery from Queen Charlotte. He names his range of pottery "Queen's Ware" after her.
- Rhododendron ponticum introduced to Britain from the Iberian Peninsula.

== Publications ==
- John Barrow's A New and Impartial History of England, from the Invasion of Julius Caesar to the Signing of Preliminaries of Peace, 1762.

== Births ==
- 9 March – William Cobbett, journalist and author (died 1835)
- 16 March – Mary Berry, writer (died 1852)
- 5 August – Bill Richmond, boxer (died 1829)
- 16 August – Prince Frederick, Duke of York and Albany (died 1827)
- 25 December – Bernard Hart, grandfather of Bret Harte, in London
- 28 December – John Molson, entrepreneur in Canada (died 1836)
- Undated – Elizabeth Pipe Wolferstan, née Jervis, novelist and poet (died 1845)

== Deaths ==
- 2 January – John Carteret, 2nd Earl Granville, statesman (born 1690)
- 11 February – William Shenstone, poet (born 1714)
- 3 May – George Psalmanazar, impostor and writer (born c. 1679 in France)
- 16 August – Francis Ayscough, clerk of the Closet, courtier and dean of Bristol (born 1701)
- 21 August – Charles Wyndham, 2nd Earl of Egremont, statesman (born 1710)
- 26 September – John Byrom, poet (born 1692)

== See also ==
- 1763 in Wales
