= Lutetia (disambiguation) =

Lutetia may refer to:

- Lutetia, the Romano-Celtic settlement on the site of today's Paris
- Paris, capital of France
- Hôtel Lutetia, a hotel in Paris
- Lučenec, in Slovakia, also Lutetia in Latin
- 21 Lutetia, an asteroid
- Lutetia, a typeface by Jan van Krimpen
- Lutetium(III) oxide, a chemical compound
- A variant of the given name Letitia
