= Latisha =

Latisha is a feminine given name. It is similar to Larissa, Tisha or Letitia.

== List of people with the given name ==
- Latisha Chan (born 1989), Taiwanese professional tennis player
- Latisha Hyman (born 1983), American musician
- Latisha McCrudden (born 2003 or 2004), Irish activist
- Latisha Wilder (born 1975), American bodybuilder

=== Fictional characters ===
- Latisha Daggert, from the British soap-opera Emmerdale
- Latisha, from the video game ToeJam & Earl III: Mission to Earth
