= Lucile Connaghan =

American politician

Member of the Wyoming House of Representatives from the Fremont County district
- In office 1933–1937 Serving with J. F. Replogle, Lester C. Hunt (1933–1935), William G. Johnson (1933–1935), E. J. Farlow (1935–1937)

Personal details
- Party: Democratic
- Occupation: Politician

Lucile Connaghan was an American politician from Riverton, Wyoming, who served in the Wyoming House of Representatives from 1933 to 1937, (Note: According to the Wyoming Legislature, Connaghan served from 1933 to 1935.) representing Fremont County as a Democrat in the 22nd and 23rd Wyoming Legislatures.

== See also ==
- Lettie D. Campbell, American politician who served in the Wyoming House of Representatives in the preceding Wyoming Legislature

== Notes ==
Wyoming House of Representatives
Preceded by —	Member of the Wyoming House of Representatives from the Fremont County district 1933–1937; Served alongside: J. F. Replogle, Lester C. Hunt (1933–1935), William G. Johnson (1933–1935), E. J. Farlow (1935–1937)	Succeeded by —
