= CSIX (disambiguation) =

CSIX may refer to:

- CSIX, common switch interface
- CSix Connect, a social network and weekly gathering of high tech professionals in career transition
- CSIRO Index, abstracts by the Australian Commonwealth Scientific and Industrial Research Organisation (CSIRO)

== See also ==
- C6 (disambiguation)
