= Sharnbrook Summit =

Nature reserve in Bedfordshire, England

Coordinates: 52.2502°N 0.5771°W

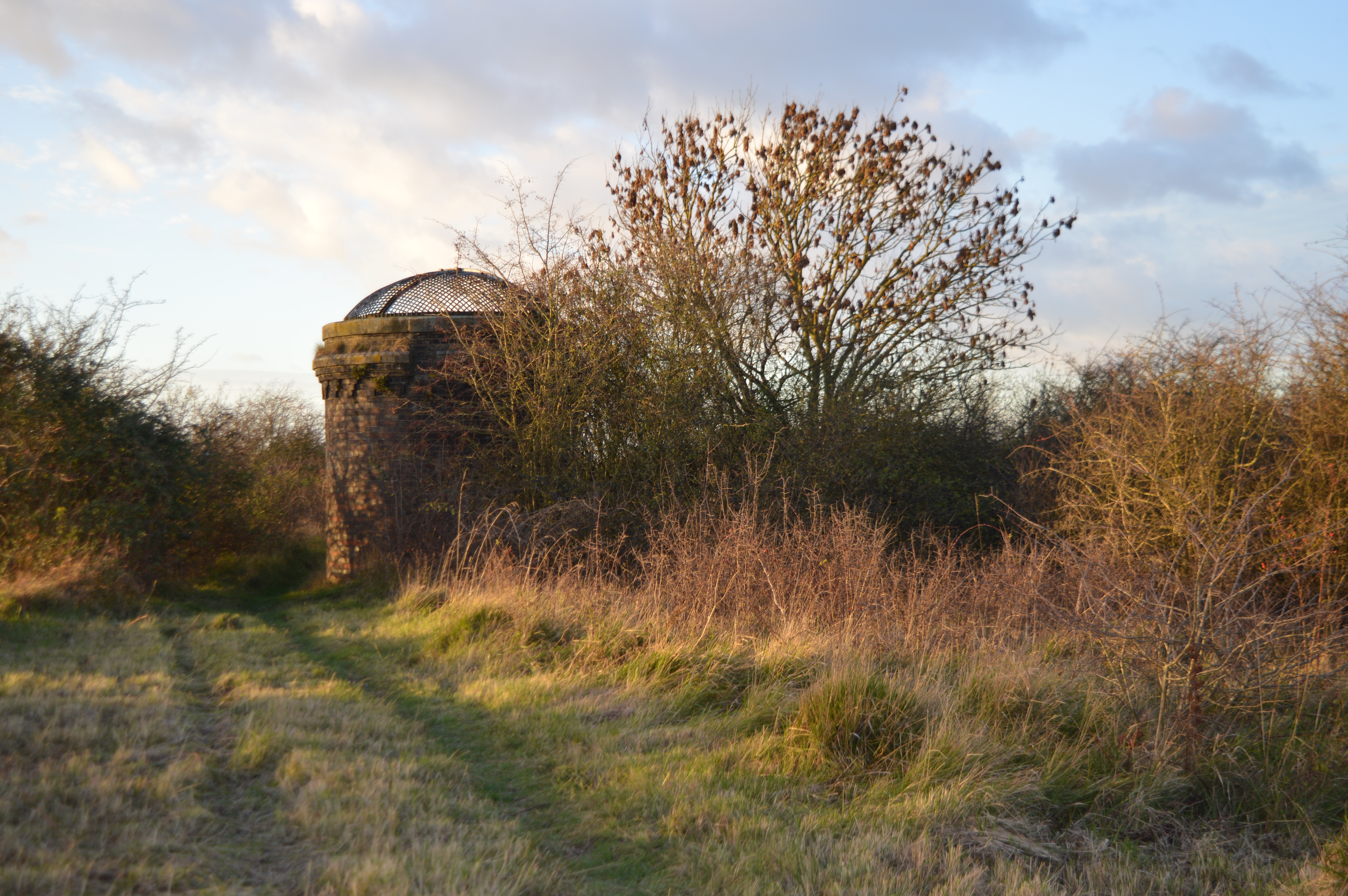
Sharnbrook Summit with rail tunnel ventilation tower

Sharnbrook Summit is a nature reserve between the villages of Sharnbrook and Wymington in Bedfordshire. It has an area of approximately nine hectares, and it is managed by the Wildlife Trust for Bedfordshire, Cambridgeshire and Northamptonshire.

The site is a mile long narrow strip above a rail tunnel, next to the Midland Main Line between Bedford and Wellingborough. The reserve is grassland, grazed by rabbits, on limestone deposited during the construction of the railway. The dominant plant is tor-grass, and flowers include dyer's greenweed and wild liquorice. Scattered scrub provides food and shelter from kestrels and buzzards for small mammals and nesting birds.

There is access from Forty Foot Lane, which bisects the site. It is close to Wymington Meadow, which is also managed by the Wildlife Trust, but there is no direct access between the sites, which are separated by the railway lines.
