= Leticia =

Leticia or Letícia (derived from the Latin greeting laetitia meaning joy, gladness, delight) may refer to:

== People ==
- Saint Leticia, a venerated virgin martyr, saint
- Queen Letizia of Spain (born 1972), queen consort of Spain
- Leticia Avilés, Ecuadoran evolutionary biologist and ecologist
- Letícia Birkheuer (born 1978), Brazilian model and actress
- Leticia Brédice (born 1975), Argentine actress and singer
- Letícia Bufoni (born 1993), Brazilian-American professional street skateboarder
- Leticia Cáceres (born 1978), Australian stage and film director
- Leticia Calderón (born 1968), Mexican actress
- Leticia Carvalho (born 1973), Brazilian oceanographer and international civil servant
- Leticia Cline (born 1978), American model
- Letícia Colin (born 1989), Brazilian actress and singer
- Letícia Costa (born 1995), Brazilian artistic gymnast
- Leticia Costas (born 1990), Spanish tennis player
- Leticia Cossettini (1904–2004), Argentine teacher, pedagogue
- Leticia Cugliandolo (born 1965), Argentine condensed matter physicist
- Leticia Dolera (born 1981), Spanish actress
- Leticia Dutra (born 1993), Brazilian group rhythmic gymnast
- Leticia Gempisao (1951/1952–2021), Filipino softball player
- Leticia Gil (born 1982), Spanish road cyclist
- Leticia Gómez-Tagle, Mexican pianist and piano teacher
- Letícia Hage (born 1990), Brazilian volleyball player
- Leticia Herrera Sánchez (born 1949), Nicaraguan lawyer, guerrilla leader, and politician
- Leticia Huijara (born 1967), Mexican actress
- Letícia Izidoro Lima da Silva (born 1994), Brazilian footballer, commonly known as Letícia or Lelê
- Leticia Lee (1964–2020), pro-Beijing activist in Hong Kong
- Leticia López Landero (born 1962), Mexican politician
- Leticia Martínez (born 1988), Paraguayan handball player
- Leticia Moreno (born 1985), Spanish violinist
- Leticia Orozco Torres (born 1953), Mexican politician
- Leticia de Oyuela (1935–2008), Honduran historian
- Leticia Padua, American YouTube live streamer, known online as SheraSeven
- Letícia Parente (1930–1991), Brazilian visual artist
- Leticia Peiris (1934–2013), Sri Lankan actress in Sri Lankan cinema, theater and television
- Leticia Perdigón (born 1956), Mexican film and television actress
- Letícia Persiles (born 1983), Brazilian actress and singer
- Leticia Rajapakse, Ceylonese social worker
- Leticia Ramos-Shahani (1929–2017), Filipina senator and writer
- Leticia Remauro, American businesswoman, politician, and author
- Leticia Ribeiro (born 1979), Brazilian jiu-jitsu black belt and multiple time world champion
- Letícia Román (1941–2025), Italian-born film actress
- Leticia Romero González (born 1995), Spanish basketball player
- Letícia Sabatella (born 1971), Brazilian actress and singer
- Leticia Sabater (born 1966), Spanish television presenter, actress and singer
- Letícia Santos (born 1994), Brazilian footballer
- Leticia Sardá (born 1980), Spanish former model, main identity of Celebrity Number Six
- Leticia Scury or Scuri (c. 1890–1950), Argentine actress
- Leticia Siciliani (born 1992), Argentinean actress and singer
- Letícia Silva, Brazilian beauty pageant titleholder
- Letícia Sobral (born 1980), Brazilian tennis player
- Leticia Spiller (born 1973), Brazilian actress
- Leticia de Souza (born 1996), Brazilian sprinter
- Leticia Suárez (born 1969), Cuban table tennis player
- Leticia Teleguario, Kaqchikel politician and Indigenous rights activist
- Leticia Tonos, Dominican director, producer and screenwriter
- Leticia Userralde (born 1961), Mexican politician
- Leticia Van de Putte (born 1954), American politician
- Letticia Viana (born 1987 or 1988), Swazi football referee

Middle name

- Juana Leticia Herrera Ale (born 1960), Mexican politician

== Places ==
- Leticia, Amazonas, a municipality in Amazonas, Colombia

== Others ==
- Apostolic Vicariate of Leticia (Latin: Apostolicus Vicariatus Laetitiae), in the Catholic Church in the city of Leticia, Colombia
- Leticia Incident (1932–35), a border conflict between Colombia and Peru
- A doll in the Groovy Girls doll line by Manhattan Toy
- Leticia Bongnino, a recurring fictional character from the Singaporean sitcom The Noose

== See also ==
- Laetitia (disambiguation), a variant of Leticia
- Letizia, a variant of Leticia
