= Mable Mathews =

American politician (1876–1948)

Member of the Wyoming House of Representatives from the Crook County district
- In office 1929–1931 Serving with H. L. Sims

Personal details
- Born: January 10, 1876 Audubon County, Iowa, U.S.
- Died: January 3, 1948 (aged 71) Santa Rosa, California, U.S.
- Resting place: Audubon, Iowa, U.S.
- Party: Republican
- Parent(s): Arthur L. Sanborn; Mary Cameron Sanborn
- Education: Gem City Business College; University of Wyoming
- Profession: Politician, educator

Mable Mathews (January 10, 1876 – January 3, 1948) was an American politician and educator from Sundance, Wyoming, who served a single term in the Wyoming House of Representatives. She was elected in 1928, and represented Crook County from 1929 to 1931 (Note: According to the Wyoming Legislature, Mathews only served in 1929.) as a Republican in the 20th Wyoming Legislature.

== Early life and education ==
Mathews was born in Audubon County, Iowa, on January 10, 1876, to Arthur L. Sanborn and Mary Cameron Sanborn. She attended schools in both Iowa and Missouri, moving to the latter state with her parents in 1893. Mathews attended business school in Chillicothe, Missouri, prior to graduating from the Gem City Business College in Quincy, Illinois.

Mathews also attended schools in Cape Girardeau, Missouri, as well as the University of Wyoming.

Mathews first came to Crook County, Wyoming, in 1898 to visit relatives.

== Career ==
Mathews served a single term in the Wyoming House of Representatives, representing Crook County from 1929 to 1931 as a Republican in the 20th Wyoming Legislature. She represented Crook County alongside H. L. Sims.

Outside of the legislature, Mathews worked as an educator.

== Death ==
Mathews died at the age of 71 in Santa Rosa, California, on January 3, 1948, following several severe heart attacks during the previous year. She was buried in Audubon, Iowa.

== See also ==
- Lettie D. Campbell, American politician who served in the Wyoming House of Representatives during the subsequent Wyoming Legislature

== Notes ==
Wyoming House of Representatives
Preceded by —	Member of the Wyoming House of Representatives from the Crook County district 1929–1931; Served alongside: H. L. Sims	Succeeded by —
