= Letitia =

Letitia /lɪˈtɪʃə, lɪˈtiːʃə/ is a feminine given name, of Latin origin meaning "joy, gladness". The name Letitia has many variants, including but not limited to: Lætitia from lætus (Latin), Letja (Dutch), Letizia (Italian), Leticia (Spanish), Letisya (Turkish) and Letisha or Latisha (American). The name Letitia first appeared in the form Lettice in medieval England and is derived from the Roman goddess Lætitia of gaiety, symbolic of happiness, prosperity and abundance.

== Variants ==
- Letícia (Portuguese, Spanish, Hungarian)
- Letitia (English), Spanish, Latin
- Letizia (Italian)
- Leata (English), Spanish
- Lätitia (German)
- Lätitzia (German)
- Tizia (German)
- Lätizia (German)
- Lattecha (Jamaican) Spanish
- Laetitia (French, Late Latin, German)
- Letizia (Italian, Corsican)
- Leticija (Latvian)
- Letiția (Romanian, Moldovan)
- Leticia (Spanish)
- Lelê(Portuguese)
- Leca (Portuguese)
- Letja (Dutch)
- Leleca (Portuguese)
- Tica (Portuguese)
- Letycja (Polish)
- Leitis(Scottish)
- Ledicia (Scottish)
- Leti(Spanish)
- Letisya (Turkish)
- Lezinha (Portuguese)
- Letisha (American English)
- Latisha (American)

== People ==
- Queen Letizia of Spain (born 1972), Queen of Spain
- Letitia Baldrige (1926–2012), American etiquette expert
- Letitia Carson (1814-1888), "Old Oregonian" of 1845, Black Homesteader
- Laetitia Casta (born 1978), French model and actress
- Letitia Chitty (1897–1982), English aeronautical engineer
- Letitia Christian Tyler (1790–1842), First Lady of the United States
- Laetitia Colombani (born 1976}, French writer and filmmaker
- Letitia Dean (born 1967), English actress
- Letitia Dunbar-Harrison (1906–1994), Irish librarian
- Letitia Dzirasa (born c. 1981), American pediatrician and public health official
- Letitia Mumford Geer, American nurse and instrument designer
- Letitia Gwynne (born 1962), Northern Irish television journalist
- Letitia James (born 1958), American politician
- Letitia Elizabeth Landon (1802–1838), English poet
- Letitia MacTavish Hargrave (1813–1854), Canadian fur trader
- Letitia Dowdell Ross (1866-1952), American educator; leader of women's organizations
- Letitia Semple (1821–1907), American society figure and unofficial First Lady
- Letitia Stevenson (1843-1913), Second Lady of the United States
- Letitia H. Verdin (born 1970), American state court judge from South Carolina
- Letitia Vriesde (born 1964), Surinamese athlete
- Lutitia "Tish" Harrison Warren (born 1979), American author and Anglican priest
- Letitia Wright (born 1993), Guyanese-English actress
- Letitia Youmans (1827–1896), Canadian temperance reformer

== Fictional characters ==
- Laetitia Bresson in the film Lupin III: The First
- Leta Lestrange in the Fantastic Beasts films
- Letitia, Missy's mother in the film Surviving Christmas
- Letitia Ketterley in the 6th book in the Chronicles of Narnia, The Magician's Nephew
- Letitia Lerner, in the comic Letitia Lerner, Superman's Babysitter
- Letitia (Dandridge) Lewis in the TV series Lovecraft Country
- Letitia Mackenzie, in the TV series Outlander
- Letitia Price, in the 2022 novel Babel, or the Necessity of Violence by R. F. Kuang
- Laetitia Prism in Oscar Wilde's play The Importance of Being Earnest
- Letitia M. Slighcarp, recurring villain in Joan Aiken's The Wolves of Willoughby Chase

== See also ==
- SS Letitia, ocean liner, later an armed merchant cruiser, troopship and hospital ship
- "Letitia", a cultivar in the Verbascum genus of plants
