= Letizia =

- Gender: Female
- Language: Italian

Origin
- Region of origin: Italy

Other names
- Nicknames: Tizi, Leti
- Related names: Leticia (disambiguation), Letitia

Letizia (pronounced [leˈtittsja]) is a predominantly Italian feminine given name. People bearing the name Letizia include:

- Queen Letizia of Spain (born 1972), wife of King Felipe VI
- Letizia Battaglia (born 1935), Italian photographer and photojournalist
- Letizia Bertoni (born 1937), Italian hurdler
- Letizia Borghesi (born 1998), Italian professional racing cyclist
- Letizia Camera (born 1992), Italian volleyball player
- Letizia Cesarini (born 1987), know professionally as Maria Antonietta, Italian singer-songwriter
- Letizia Ciampa (born 1986), Italian voice actress
- Letizia Cicconcelli (born 1999), Italian group rhythmic gymnast
- Letizia Gambi, Italian singer-songwriter and actress
- Letizia Giorgianni (born 1977), Italian politician
- Letizia Moratti (born 1949), Italian businesswoman and politician
- Letizia Nuzzo (born 1976), Italian former synchronized swimmer
- Letizia Paternoster (born 1999), Italian racing cyclist
- Letizia Paoli (born 1966), Italian criminologist
- Letizia Quaranta (1892–1977), Italian actress
- Letizia Ramolino (1750–1836), Italian noble, mother of Napoleon I of France
- Letizia Roscher (born 2004), German pair skater
- Letizia Tontodonati (born 1999), Italian rower
