= The Lettuce (disambiguation) =

The Lettuce most often refers to the Liz Truss lettuce, a vegetable used as political commentary in the United Kingdom in 2022.

The Lettuce may also refer to:

- "The Lettuce", a song on the 1998 album Deer Apartments by Matt Pond PA
- The Lettuce, English translation of La Lechuga, an 18th-century Catholic monstrance

== See also ==
- Lettuce (disambiguation)
