= CVI =

CVI may refer to:

== Ancient history & culture ==
- 106 in Roman numerals
- Cvi, a verbal formation in classical Sanskrit connected with the Devi and Vrkis feminines

== Geography ==
- Cape Verde Islands, UNDP code

== Medical conditions ==
- Cerebrovascular insult, a medical condition more commonly known as stroke
- Chronic venous insufficiency, a medical condition affecting veins of the leg
- Cortical visual impairment, a form of brain-related visual impairment

== Business, industry & technology ==
- Chemical vapor infiltration, a chemical vapor deposition type process used for ceramic matrix composites
- Colloid vibration current, an electroacoustic phenomenon in colloids
- Commercial Vehicle Inspection, enforcement of safety laws regarding commercial vehicles
- Component video input, a video connection mode
- Composite video interface, a video signal format
- Corporate visual identity
- The C.V.I., an automobile produced in Michigan in 1907–1908
- LabWindows/CVI, an event-driven, ANSI C programming environment

== Fiction / Literature ==
- Cyber-Viral Implant, a fictional technology in the television series Earth: Final Conflict

== Sports ==
- Concours de Voltige International

== See also ==
- C6 (disambiguation), including a list of topics named C.VI, etc.
