= Wymington Meadow =

Nature reserve in Bedfordshire, England

Coordinates: 52.2593°N 0.5965°W

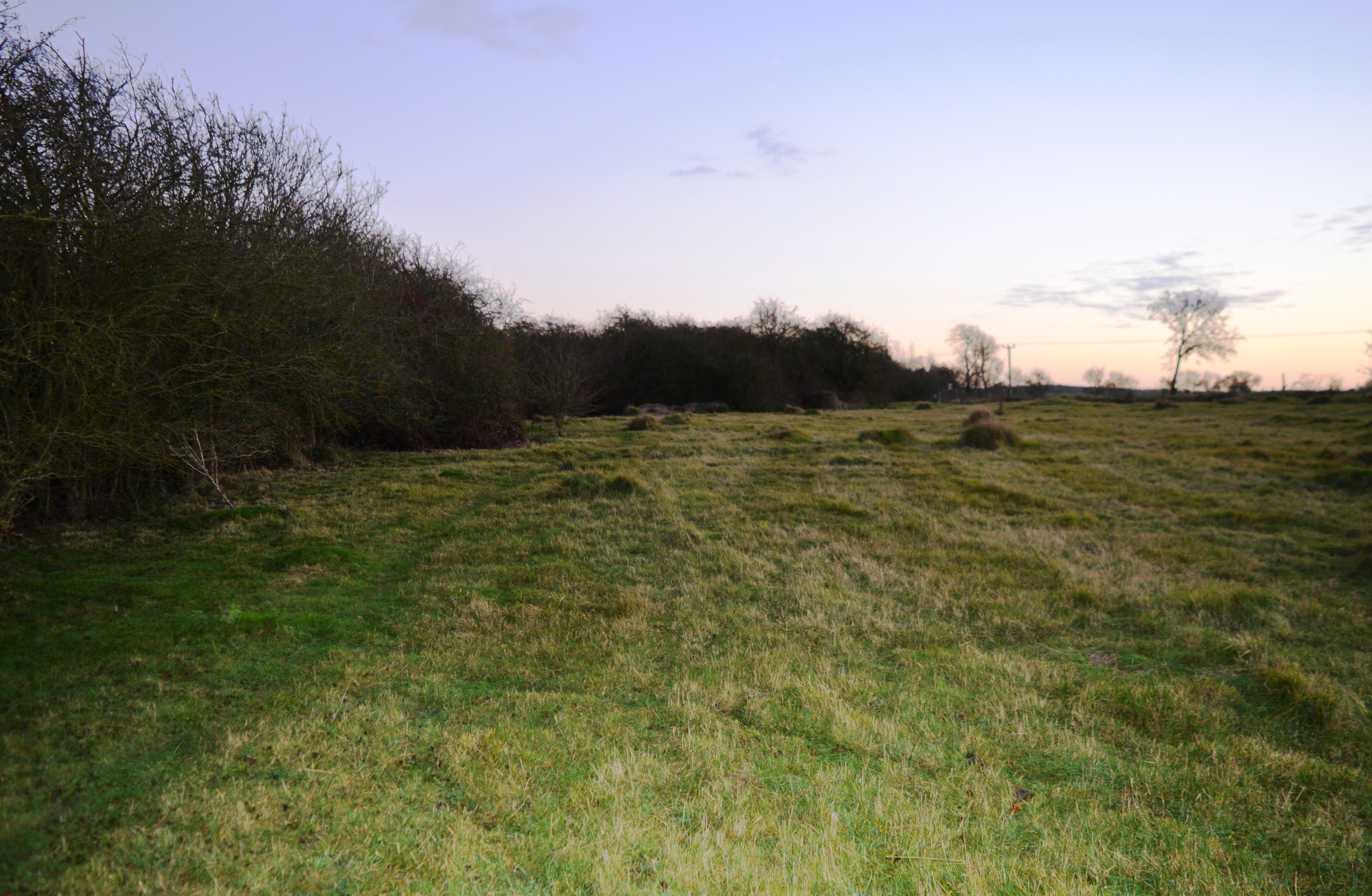

Wymington Meadow is a nature reserve south of Wymington in Bedfordshire. It is approximately one hectare, and is managed by the Wildlife Trust for Bedfordshire, Cambridgeshire and Northamptonshire.

The site is a triangular meadow in the corner where two railway lines merge. It was cut off when the railways were constructed in the 1850s, and at the northern end there are traces of the ancient ridge and furrow method of ploughing. The site has a wide range of flowers, such as cowslip, salad burnet and quaking grass. A small stream and hedgerows provide additional habitats for wildlife.

There is access by a footpath from South Grove. Cross the railway by a footbridge, cross to the other side of the field and turn left. Pass (but do not cross) a second footbridge. The path can be very muddy. The site is close to Sharnbrook Summit, but there no direct access between the reserves as they are separated by the railway lines.
