= Lettuce (disambiguation) =

Lettuce is a leafy vegetable. The name is also applied to other related and unrelated plants. Including the leafy vegetable these are

- the cultivated lettuce, Lactuca sativa
- other species of the genus Lactuca
- wall lettuce, Mycelis muralis or Lactuca muralis
- miner's lettuce, Claytonia perfoliata
- lamb's lettuce, Valerianella locusta
- chalk lettuce, Dudleya pulverulenta

Lettuce may also refer to:

- Lettuce (band), American funk band
- Fresh Lettuce (band), American rap band
- Lettuce sandwich
- Hedda Lettuce, American drag performer
- Lettuce Lake, a body of water in Lettuce Lake Park
- Lettuce as a slang for "hair" in bro culture
- Liz Truss lettuce, sometimes referred to as "the lettuce"

== See also ==
- The Lettuce (disambiguation)
- Lettuce Entertain You Enterprises, a restaurant consortium
- Lettice (disambiguation)
