= Church of St Lawrence, Wymington =

Church in Bedfordshire, England

Coordinates: 52.2695°N 0.6016°W

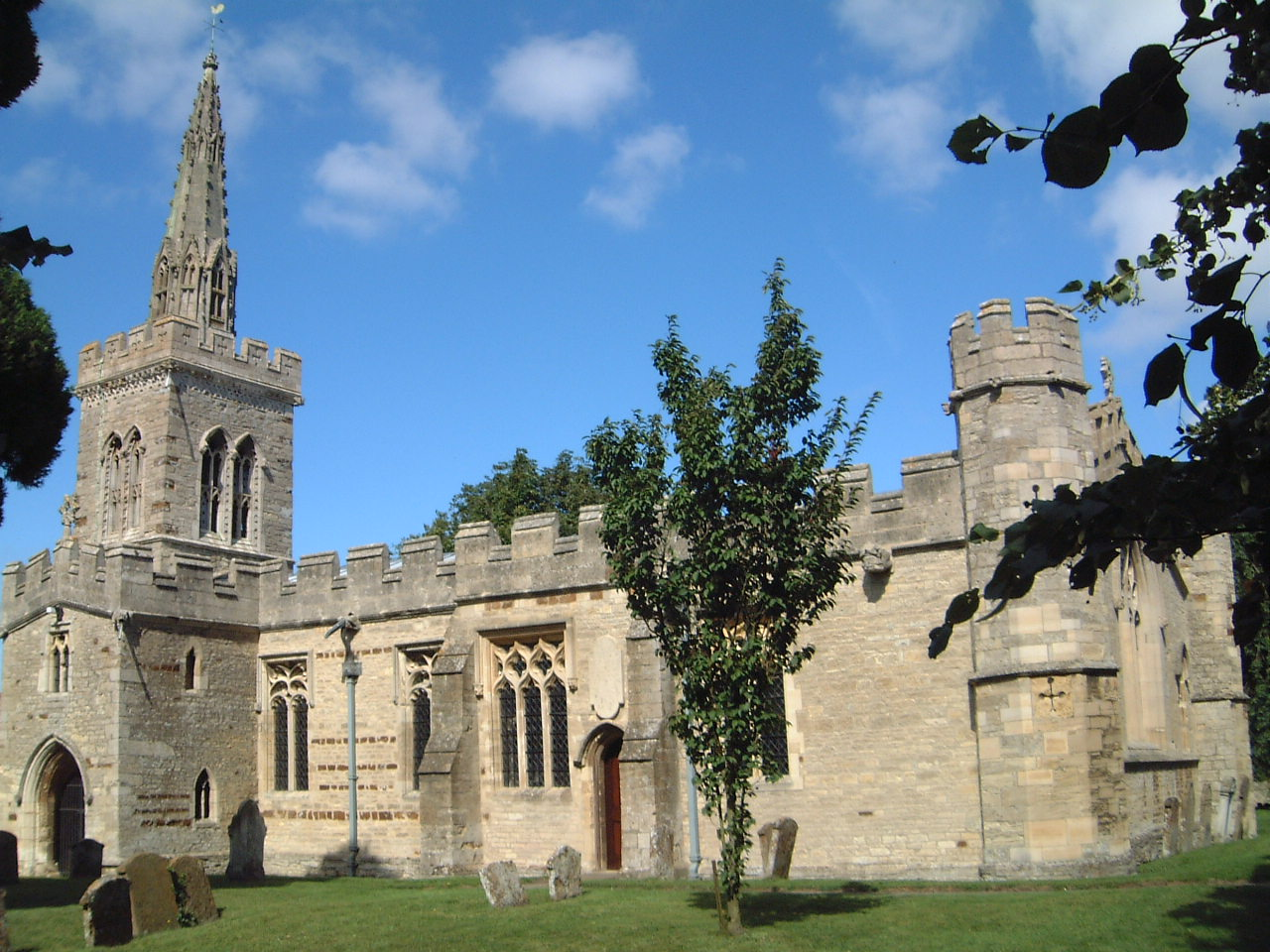
St. Lawrence Church

The Parish Church of Saint Lawrence, Wymington is a Grade I listed church in Wymington, Bedfordshire, England. It became a listed building on 13 July 1964. The church was built in 1377 with funds bequeathed by John Curteys, the mayor of the wool staple at Calais, though there are records of a previous church on the site dating back to at least 1235. The church is noted for its 15th-century doom painting depicting Christ in glory with scenes of the judgement as well as its funerary brasses and monuments.

== See also ==
- Grade I listed buildings in Bedfordshire
