= 6C =

6C or VI-C may refer to:

- Sixth Cambridge Survey of Radio Sources
- Alfa Romeo 6C, a road, race and sports car
- Keratin 6C in biochemistry
- Stalag VI-C, a German prisoner of war camp
- Carbon (_{6}C), a chemical element
- 6C, the production code for the 1982 Doctor Who serial Time-Flight

== See also ==
- C6 (disambiguation)
