= Laetitia Rispel =

South African professor of public health

Laetitia Charmaine Rispel
- Education: BSc University of Cape Town; PhD University of the Witwatersrand
- Scientific career
- Fields: Public Health
- Workplaces: University of the Witwatersrand
- Website: www.wits.ac.za/staff/academic-a-z-listing/r/laetitiarispelwitsacza/

Laetitia Charmaine Rispel is a South African Professor of Public Health at the University of the Witwatersrand. Rispel's work has investigated health policy and management and health services research.

== Career and impact ==
Rispel has served consecutively as the head of the Gauteng Department of Health (from 2001), Human Sciences Research Council of South Africa HIV/AIDS research program (from 2006) and the University of the Witwatersrand School of Public Health (from 2012). From 2008 - 2014 she was the president of the Public Health Association of South Africa. She holds the National Research Foundation of South Africa Research Chair on Health Workforce for Equity, and Quality and in 2016 she was elected as vice-president/president elect of the World Federation of Public Health Associations. Rispel has served as the President of the World Federation of Public Health Associations since 2018, and she is the first African woman to hold this position. She is a member of the Academy of Science of South Africa.

== Awards and honors ==
- Shoprite Checkers/SABC2 Women of the Year award - Health Category, (2003)
