= Lettie A. Smith =

American inventor (1816–1912)

Lettie Ann Smith (December 11, 1816 – June 12, 1912) was an American inventor and one of the first female doctors in Newtown, Bucks County, Pennsylvania.

== Early life ==
Lettie A. Smith was born on December 11, 1816. Her father was Joseph Smith and her mother was Mary Betts Smith. During her childhood Lettie would assist her mother with chores around the family house and farm. Her father gave up farming and rented the property out in 1857.

== Religion ==
Lettie was raised Quaker and attended the Wrightstown Monthly Meeting with her family. Lettie hosted the first First Day School in Bucks County in her home in 1868. First Day Schools were missionary schools. Her house on Chancellor Street in Newtown was also utilized by the Bucks County Quarterly Meeting of Friends as a home for aged and homeless Friends.

== Invention ==
Lettie Smith is credited with inventing the "Labor-Saving Butter-Worker", which was patented on August 23, 1853. This butter maker was equipped a butter tray which had an ice drawer underneath that helped cool the butter and made it easier to work. A paddle allowed the operator to work the butter horizontally as well as vertically. The butter tray tipped forward to drain water and other fluids through a spout. The Worker also had a scale which weighed the final amount of butter produced. Her invention received a lot of praise including from James A. Cornell, the then president of the Bucks County Agricultural Society, who stated, "...I have used one of Lettie A. Smith's Butter Workers, and think it a great benefit in the separation of the milk from the butter, and would recommend it generally." The Lancaster Examiner heralded the invention as a "useful improvement...and is well worthy the attention of dairymen generally." Although none of her butter workers survive today, a salesman's sample of her invention is on permanent display in the Butter and Cheese Making exhibit in the Mercer Museum.

== Career ==
After her father rented out the family property in 1857, Lettie traveled West. There she became interested in electricity and how it could be used to treat human diseases. Lettie Smith graduated from the Women's Medical College of Pennsylvania on March 16, 1867. She wrote her final thesis on "the liver and its diseases". Lettie then opened her own practice in Newtown, Bucks County, Pennsylvania. In 1872 she bought property in Newtown and built a three-story brick house. Its address was 18 South Chancellor Street. Part of this house served as her office and where she received patients.

== Death ==
Lettie Smith died on June 12, 1912, at the age of 95. The cause on her death certificate is listed as "paralysis". She was interred at the Wrightstown Friends Meeting Cemetery in Wrightstown, Bucks County, Pennsylvania.

== Notable works ==
- Edward Hicks by Dr. Lettie A. Smith, presented at the Bucks County Historical Society, Solebury Meeting, November 18, 1884.
