= Leticia Avilés =

Evolutionary biologist and ecologist

Leticia Avilés is an Ecuadoran evolutionary biologist and ecologist who studies the evolution of social behavior and the evolution of life history traits in metapopulations. Her methods include a combination of theory and empirical work, the latter using social spiders as a model system. Her research on these organisms has addressed questions such as why some spiders live in groups, why do they exhibit highly female-biased sex ratios, and why have they evolved a system where individuals remain in the natal nest to mate from generation to generation.

== Career ==
Avilés is perhaps best known for having recognized the importance of social spiders as model systems to address basic questions in ecology and evolution. In the process she discovered a number of social spiders previously unknown to science, including a nomadic social spider whose colonies reproduce by fission—Aebutina binotata, a social lynx spider—Tapinillus sp., and a social theridiid whose colonies exhibit a boom and bust pattern of growth and adult females occur in two distinct size classes—Theridion nigroannulatum. Her theoretical work has addressed questions such as the importance of multilevel selection in the evolution of female-biased sex ratios, why strongly inbred systems may evolve, and the importance of ecology and nonlinear dynamics in social evolution. One of Avilés's theoretical papers addresses the question of how cooperation among nonrelatives can be maintained despite the presence of freeloaders. Today, Avilés is a professor in the Department of Zoology at the University of British Columbia in Canada, where she does research in ecology and evolution.

== Education ==
Avilés is a native of Ecuador.

- Undergraduate: Licentiate in Biological Sciences, Pontificia Universidad Católica del Ecuador, Quito.
- Ph.D: Organismic and Evolutionary Biology, Harvard University, 1992.
- Postdoctoral Fellow: Research Training Group in the Analysis of Biological Diversification, University of Arizona, 1992–1994.

== Awards ==
- 2013 NSERC Discovery Grants Accelerator Award for Research
- 2001 Fellow Wissenschaftskolleg zu Berlin for Research
- 1992 Young Investigator Award, American Society of Naturalists for Research
