= Leticia Gómez-Tagle =

Mexican pianist and piano teacher

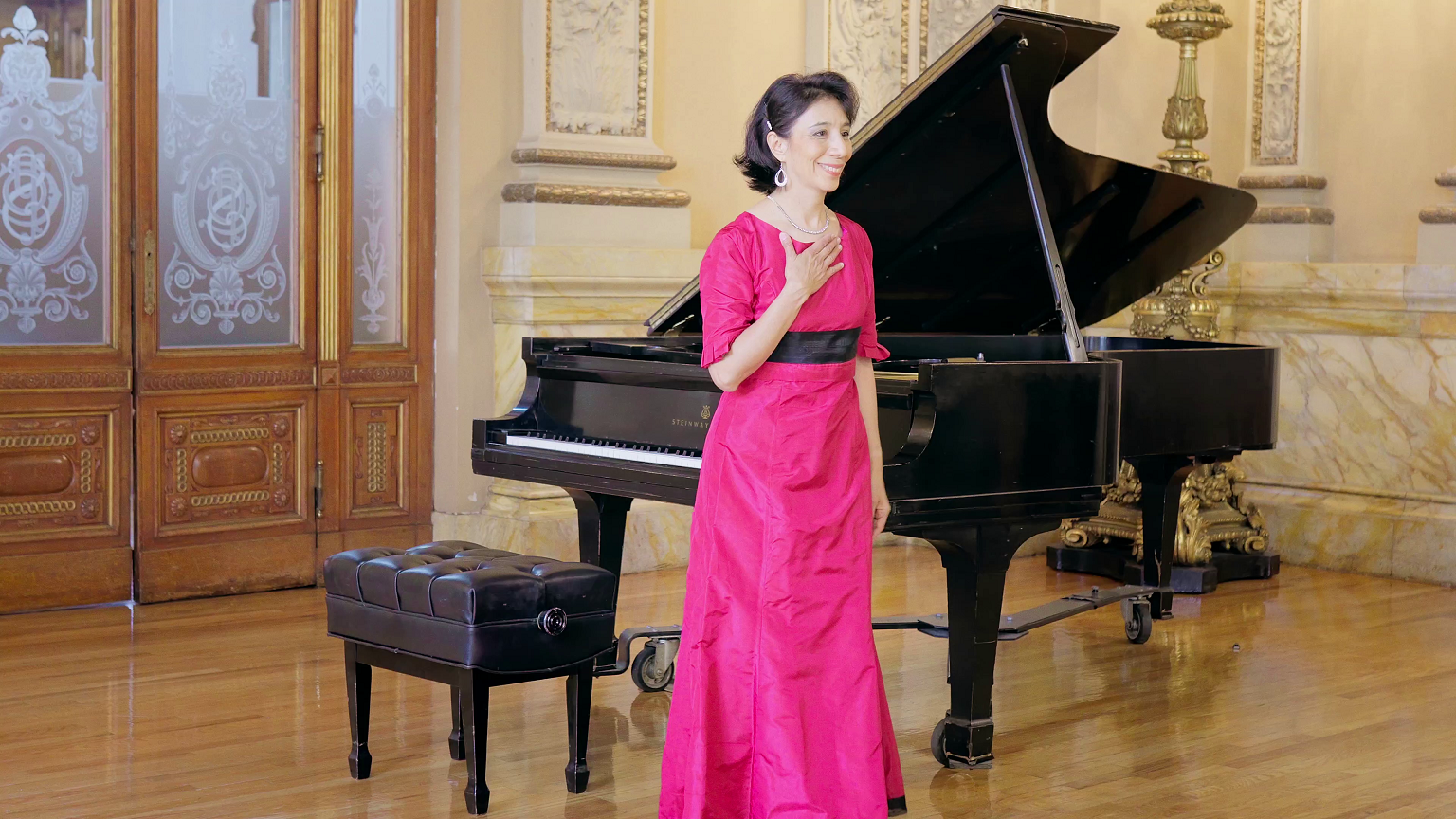
- Gómez-Tagle in 2026
- Born: Mexico City, Mexico
- Education: University of Music and Performing Arts Vienna
- Occupations: Pianist; music educator
- Style: Classical

Leticia Gómez-Tagle (born in Mexico City) is a Mexican pianist and piano teacher. She has been teaching as a member of the Music Faculty at the University Panamericana since 2023.

== Biography ==
Leticia Gómez-Tagle received her first academic training in Mexico, where her professors were mainly Manuel Delaflor (piano) and Angel Esteva Loyola (music theory).

She won prizes in youth piano competitions sponsored by Mexican Radio, Televisa, and the University of Puebla.

After winning first prize at the Sala Chopin National Competition, she was awarded a scholarship jointly by the Austrian Federal Ministry and the Fomento Musical de Sala Chopin to study at the University of Music and Performing Arts Vienna. There, she studied piano with Michael Krist, completing concert performance and instrumental pedagogy studies with distinction. She also received guidance from Carlos Rivera in Vienna and participated in masterclasses with Orlando Otey, Jörg Demus, Paul Badura-Skoda and György Sándor.

Since her participation at the International Chopin Piano Competition in Warsaw in 1990, she has performed regularly at various music festivals in Mexico and Europe.

As a soloist, she has performed with numerous orchestras at home and abroad, including with the Orquesta Filarmónica de México, Orquesta Sinfónica del IPN (Mexico), Orquesta Filarmónica de Querétaro, Symphonic Orchestra of the Music School Linz, and the Chamber Orchestra with members of the Bruckner Orchestra Linz under the direction of conductors such as Ingo Ingensand, Jesús Medina, Benjamín Juárez Echenique and Guadalupe Flores.

In addition to performing, she has developed a reputation as a transcriber and interpreter of Latin American repertoire. Her solo piano transcription of Arturo Márquez's "Danzón No. 2"—authorized by the composer—has been widely performed, including by pianists such as Yuja Wang.

She has given master classes in Spain (Mallorca, Córdoba and Granada), Mexico (CENART University) and Lebanon at the Sin el-Fil Conservatory. Since 1999 she has been teaching at the Music School of the City of Linz.

In recent years, Gómez-Tagle has appeared as soloist with the Orquesta Filarmónica Mexiquense under the direction of Gabriela Díaz Alatriste, one of Mexico’s leading women conductors.

== Reception ==
Her playing has been described as serious, respectful, and modest in style, focusing on conveying the composer's intentions rather than showmanship. Critics have praised her performances of works ranging from Chopin to Tchaikovsky and her ability to bridge European and Latin American musical traditions.

Her album Dance Passion (2016) was praised for its imaginative survey of dance-inspired works across Europe and Latin America.

The follow-up, Poems and Pictures (2018), received international acclaim. Fanfare praised her "liquid lyricism" in Ravel's "Ondine", the clarity and rhythmic dash of her version of "Scarbo", and her colorful interpretation of Mussorgsky's Pictures at an Exhibition.

Her Sonatas in B Minor (2019), featuring works by Chopin, Liszt, and Scarlatti, was described by ResMusica as combining "transparency of textures" with a focus on structural clarity and harmonic nuance. Maciej Chiżyński noted her Chopin performance for its "variety of colors that caress the ear", while recognizing her measured approach in Liszt. Fanfare characterized the album as "bravery in the face of two of the repertoire's most technically daunting and musically challenging B-Minor Sonatas."

== Recordings ==
- 2010: Dos Continentes, scherzi by Chopin and Latin American works by Piazzola, Ginastera, Moleiro, and Hugo Gómez Tagle among others (Urtext)
- 2016: Dance Passion, works by Liszt, Chopin, Brahms, de Falla, Albéniz, Ginastera, and Márquez among others (ARS Produktion)
- 2017: Poems & Pictures, Gaspard de la Nuit by Ravel, Pictures at an Exhibition by Mussorgsky, two transcriptions by Schubert / Liszt (ARS Produktion)
- 2019: Sí! Sonatas, Piano Sonata No. 3 in B minor, Op. 58 by Chopin, Piano Sonata in B minor by Liszt and Piano Sonata in B minor, K. 87 by Domenico Scarlatti (ARS Produktion)
- Poems and Pictures (ARS Produktion, 2018) – Ravel’s Gaspard de la nuit, Mussorgsky’s Pictures at an Exhibition, and Schubert/Liszt transcriptions.
- Sonatas in B Minor (ARS Produktion, 2019) – Chopin’s Piano Sonata No. 3 in B minor, Liszt’s Sonata in B minor, and Scarlatti’s Sonata in B minor K. 87.

== Publications ==
- Arturo Márquez, "Danzón No. 2", transcription for solo piano (Hamburg: Peermusic Classical, 2016).
