= Letty Quintero =

Ecuadorian footballer (born 1985)

Personal information
- Full name: Letty Leonor Quintero Orrego
- Date of birth: 13 November 1985 (age 40)
- Position: Full-back

Senior career*
Years	Team	Apps	(Gls)
- Guayas selection

International career^{‡}
2004	Ecuador U19	1+	(0+)
2006	Ecuador	4	(0)
- * Club domestic league appearances and goals ‡ National team caps and goals as of 18 November 2006

Letty Leonor Quintero Orrego (born 13 November 1985) is an Ecuadorian former footballer who played as a full-back. She has been a member of the Ecuador women's national team.

== Club career ==
Quintero has played for the Guayas selection in Ecuador.

== International career ==
Quintero represented Ecuador at the 2004 South American U-19 Women's Championship. She capped at senior level during the 2006 South American Women's Football Championship.
