= Laetitia Agab =

Algerian footballer (born 1985)

Personal information
- Date of birth: 13 February 1985 (age 41)
- Place of birth: Saint-Étienne, France
- Position: Defender

Senior career*
| Years | Team | Apps | (Gls) |
| 2007–2011 | AS Saint-Étienne | 48 | (0) |
| 2011–2016 | Le Puy Foot 43 Auvergne | 65 | (0) |

International career
| 2007– | Algeria | | |
- * Club domestic league appearances and goals

Lætitia Agab-Cluzel (born 13 February 1985) is a footballer who plays as a defender. She previously played for Saint-Étienne in Division 1 Feminine, and Le Puy Foot 43 Auvergne in France's second division league. Born in France, she represented the Algeria at international level.

== Early life ==
Agab-Cluzel began playing football with boys at a young age. She followed her father, who played for Talaudiere.

== Playing career ==
=== Club ===
Agab made her debut for Saint-Étienne during the 2006–07 season. She made seven starts in her eight appearances for the club in the second division. After the team moved to Division 1 Feminine starting in the 2007–08 season, Agab made 11 starts in her 15 appearances. The team finished in fourth place during the regular season with a 10–8–4 record. During the 2008–09 season, she made 11 starts in 15 appearances. The team finished in eight place with a 7–9–6 record. Returning to Saint-Étienne for her fourth consecutive season, Agab made 16 appearances during the 2009–10 season, making 10 starts. The team finished in sixth place with 8–12–2 record. During the 2010–11 season, the team finished in fifth place. Agab made five appearances.

=== International ===
A dual citizen of France and Algeria, Agab represented Algeria on the Algeria women's national football team starting in 2007. She competed with the team at the African Games tournament and the Africa Women Cup of Nations qualifications.

== Honors and awards ==
Saint-Étienne

- Coupe de France Féminine Winner: 2010−11
