= Nokia C6 =

Nokia C6 can refer to

- Nokia C6 (1997), a mobile phone for the German C-Netz network, similar to Nokia 2110
- Nokia C6-00, a Symbian^1 smartphone, announced in April 2010
- Nokia C6-01, a Symbian^3 smartphone, announced in September 2010
