= 39 Laetitia =

Main-belt asteroid

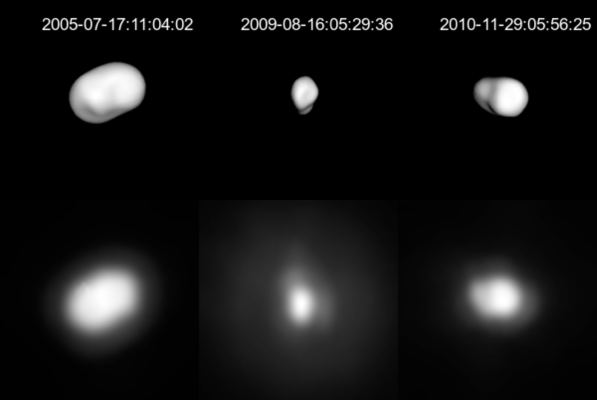

Discovery
- Discovered by: J. Chacornac
- Discovery date: 8 February 1856

Designations
- Pronunciation: /lɛˈtɪʃiə/
- Named after: Laetitia
- Minor planet category: Main belt

Orbital characteristics
- Epoch 31 December 2006 (JD 2454100.5)
- Aphelion: 461.503 million km (3.085 AU)
- Perihelion: 366.877 million km (2.452 AU)
- Semi-major axis: 414.190 million km (2.769 AU)
- Eccentricity: 0.114
- Orbital period (sidereal): 1,682.713 d (4.61 a)
- Mean anomaly: 58.261°
- Inclination: 10.383°
- Longitude of ascending node: 157.168°
- Argument of perihelion: 209.560°

Physical characteristics
- Dimensions: 219 km × 142 km
- Mean diameter: 164±3 km
- Mass: (6.14±0.24)×10^{18} kg (Note: Calculated from its standard gravitational parameter GM = 0.410±0.016 km^{3}/s^{2}.)
- Mean density: 2.66±0.18 g/cm^{3}
- Synodic rotation period: 5.138238 h (0.2140933 d)
- Pole ecliptic longitude: 323° ± 2°
- Pole ecliptic latitude: 32° ± 2°
- Geometric albedo: 0.287 (geometric)
- Spectral type: S
- Apparent magnitude: 8.97 to 12.18
- Absolute magnitude (H): 6.1
- Angular diameter: 0.142″–0.051″

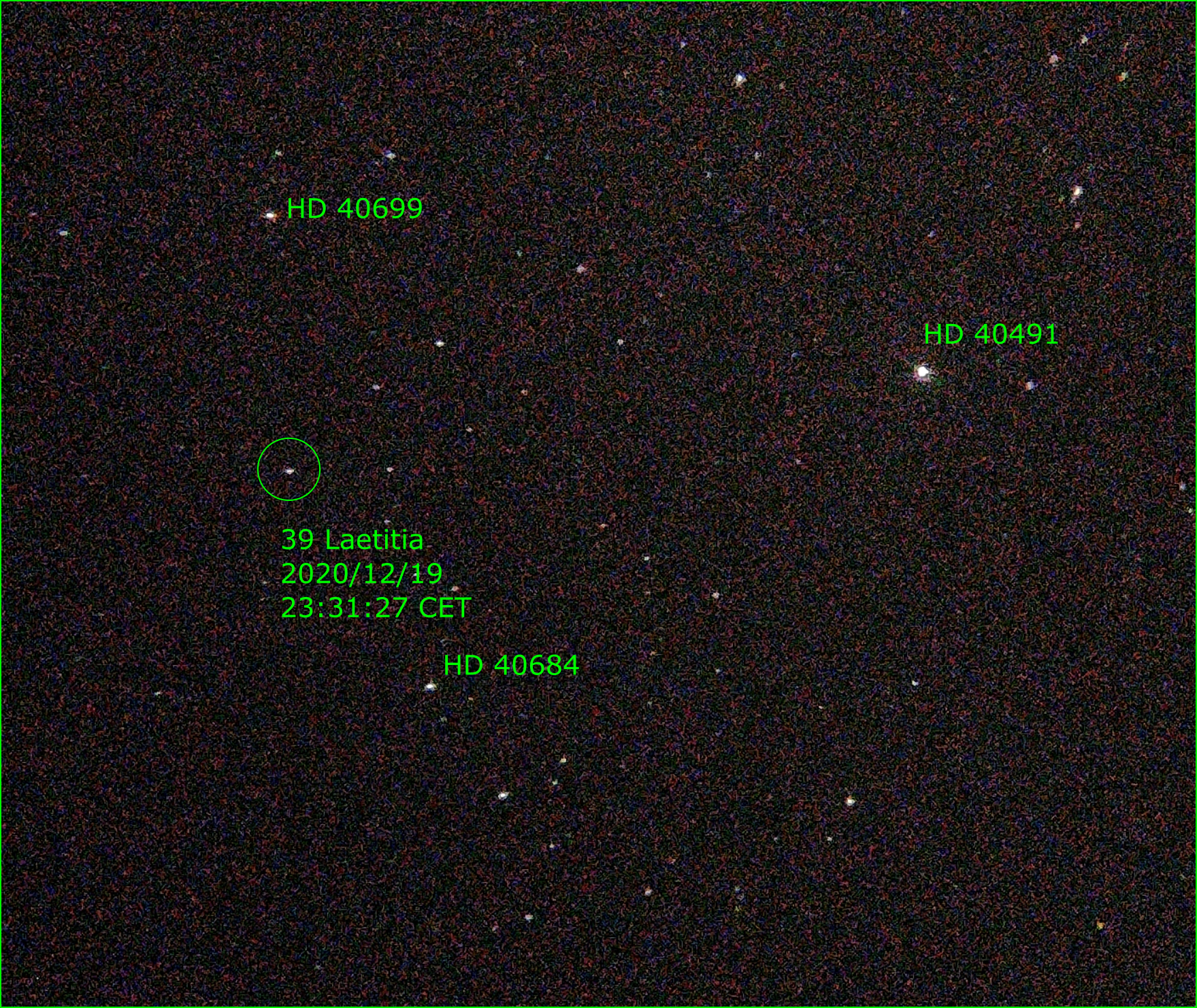
39 Laetitia photographed in December 2020

39 Laetitia is a large main-belt asteroid that was discovered by French astronomer Jean Chacornac on 9 February 1856 and named after Laetitia, a minor Roman goddess of gaiety. The spectrum matches an S-type, indicating a stony (silicate) composition. It is orbiting the Sun with a period of 4.61 years and is spinning on its axis once every 5.1 hours.

Photometric observations of this asteroid gathered between 1968 and 1974 were used to build a light curve that provided shape and rotation information. It has the general shape of an elongated triaxial ellipsoid with ratios between the lengths of the axes equal to 15:9:5. Major surface features are on a scale of 10 km and the surface color does not vary significantly across the surface. In the ecliptic coordinate system, the pole of rotation is estimated to be oriented to the coordinates (λ_{0}, β_{0}) = (323°±2°, +32°±2°).

In 1988 a search for satellites or dust orbiting this asteroid was performed using the UH88 telescope at the Mauna Kea Observatories, but the effort came up empty. Photometric observations collected during 2006–08 were used to measure time variations of the asteroid light curve. This data suggests that the asteroid may have a complex shape or it could be a binary asteroid system. Observations of an occultation on 21 March 1998, produced several chords indicating an ellipsoidal cross-section of 219 km × 142 km.
