= C6 (group) =

Currency swap agreement

The C6 (also called the C6 swap line network or G6) is a currency swap agreement between the six largest central banks in the world. Comprising the U.S. Federal Reserve (Fed), the European Central Bank (ECB), the Bank of Japan (BoJ), the Bank of England (BoE), the Swiss National Bank (SNB), and the Bank of Canada (BoC), the mechanism was established as a temporary measure during the 2008 global financial crisis and was made permanent on October 31, 2013.

The C6 functions as an international lender of last resort for the Eurodollar market (offshore dollars), which previously lacked a systematic public backstop. Its swap lines allows any member central bank to borrow foreign currency from another member, using its own currency as collateral. Incalm times, amounts are small, serving as a routine buffer for normal strains in global funding, but during emergency periods, such as the peak of the 2008 crisis (nearly $600 billion borrowed), the Covid-19 pandemic in March 2020, and the collapse of Credit Suisse in March 2023, drawings increase significantly.

In practice, the Federal Reserve provides dollars to the ECB, the BoJ, the BoE, the SNB, and the BoC, which obtain unlimited loans in dollars from the U.S. central bank, using their national currency as collateral. Nine additional central banks from Emerging countries, such as Brazil, Mexico, and China, have limited access to these lines. The cost of the loan is set at a negotiated rate, and the exchange rate used is that of the contract date (a swap with no explicit currency risk).
