= John Lettice =

English clergyman, translator, academic and author

John Lettice (27 December 1737 – 18 October 1832) was an English clergyman, translator, academic, and author. Lettice served as vicar of Peasmarsh, East Sussex. He was prebendary of Chichester Cathedral, chaplain to the Archibald Hamilton, 9th Duke of Hamilton from 1804 to 1832, and was fellow and tutor of Sidney Sussex College, Cambridge.

== Life and career ==
Lettice was born at Rushden in Northamptonshire. His father was Rector of Strixton and Vicar of Bozeat. His mother Mary (née Newcome) was the daughter of Richard Newcome, rector of Wymington.

He attended Oakham School from 1752 until his admission to Sidney Sussex College in 1756. An inheritance upon his father's death allowed him to continue his studies. Lettice ultimately received a Doctor of Divinity. After earning a master's degree and winning the Seatonian Prize in 1764 for his poem called "The Conversion of St. Paul," he was appointed a select preacher by the University. He enjoyed literary connections and, in February 1765, was instrumental in Johnson's sole visit to Cambridge. He travelled throughout Europe, taking a position in Copenhagen as tutor to the family of the Envoy Extraordinary of Great Britain Sir Robert Gunning, 1st Baronet and translating some works to Danish.

He was presented the Peasmarsh vicarage by Sidney Sussex College in 1785 and married the daughter of Alderman John Newling of Cambridge in October 1786. His wife died soon after the marriage. He later remarried the widow of a local physician. He continued publishing into his 80s. In his later years, Lettice required the assistance of a curate to assist with duties in the vicarage.

Lettice tutored many English notables, including book collector William Thomas Beckford, who had a biography of Lettice among his collection.

Lettice died at the vicarage in Peasmarsh. He was included in the Dictionary of National Biography.

== Selected publications ==
- The Conversion of St. Paul (1765)
- Letters on a Tour Through Various Parts of Scotland: In the Year 1792 (1794)
- Fables for the Fire-side (1812)
- Suggestions on Clerical Elocution (1822)
