= Wymington =

Village in Bedfordshire, England

Coordinates: 52.27°N 0.60°W

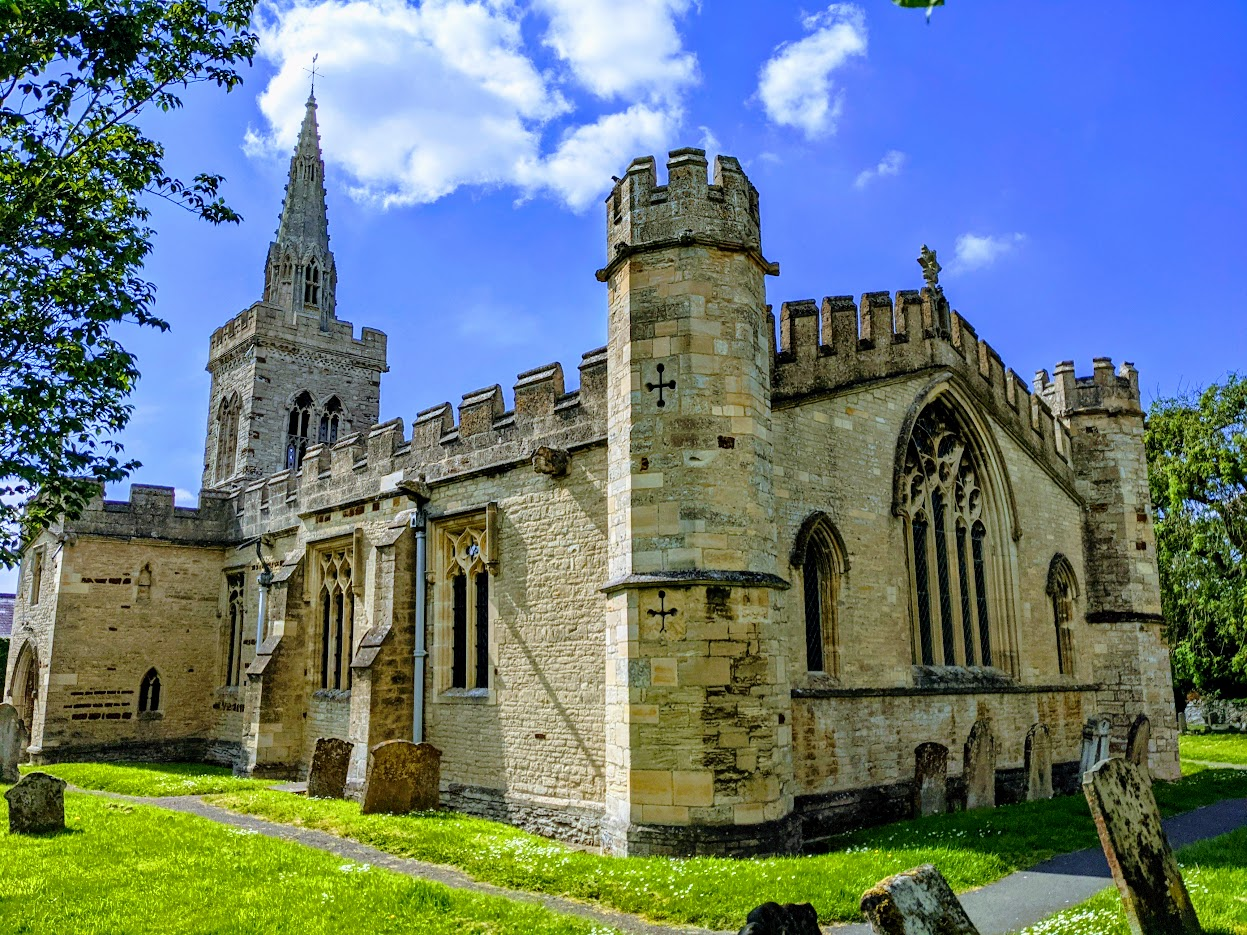
- Parish Church of St. Lawrence, Wymington

- Location within Bedfordshire
- Population: 1,000 (2021 Census)
- OS grid reference: SP955196
- Civil parish: Wymington
- Unitary authority: Bedford
- Ceremonial county: Bedfordshire
- Region: East
- Country: England
- Sovereign state: United Kingdom
- Post town: RUSHDEN
- Postcode district: NN10
- Dialling code: 01933
- Police: Bedfordshire
- Fire: Bedfordshire
- Ambulance: East of England
- UK Parliament: North Bedfordshire

Wymington is a small village and civil parish in the borough of Bedford in northwestern Bedfordshire, England. It is located about 1.7 miles (2.7 km) south of Rushden, in the neighbouring county of Northamptonshire, and about 10 miles (16 km) north-northwest of Bedford. As of 2021, the parish of Wymington had a population of 1,000. The village is home to a 14th century parish church, a Wesleyan chapel, and a school. Wymington is home to four listed buildings, including the Grade I listed parish church. The village dates from at least 1086, when it was registered in the Domesday Book, though evidence has been discovered of Paleolithic, Roman, and Saxon settlement in the area.

== Name ==
Throughout its history Wymington has been referred to by various names and spellings, including Wimmington, Winnington, Wimentone, Wimuntun, Widmintun, Wymingas, and other variations. Numerous etymologies for the name have been proposed, with the most common being that it is derived from Old English and refers to a tūn held by a person named Wigmund, Widmund, or Wimund. Other older sources propose that it is a reference to the site of an ancient, possibly Roman, battle.

== History ==
=== Prehistory and Roman settlement ===
Evidence exists of Neolithic and Bronze Age settlement of the Wymington area. Flint implements have been discovered in the area, and in the 1860s a hoard of 60 socketed axes was found on a farm near Wymington, possibly from an ancient bronze smith's stock.

Substantial evidence of Roman and Romano-Belgic settlement exists. A complex of enclosures visible today in the form of cropmarks and ditches as well as buried roof tiles and sherds about 700 metres (770 yd) south of the modern village probably dates from the 1st to 5th century. Additional evidence of Roman occupation has been discovered northwest of the village, where 3rd century pottery, a quern, building rubble, coins, belt buckles, and jewelry have been discovered.

=== Middle Ages ===
Evidence of Saxon settlement was uncovered during an expansion of the Wymington school. Shards of early to middle Saxon pottery were discovered in ditches that had probably been dug in the 12th to 13th century. Wymington was recorded in the Domesday Book of 1086 as a parish within the Hundred of Willey, a part of the barony held by Alured de Lincoln, with a population of 23 households.

==== The Wymington manors ====
The lordship of the Wymington manors was held by numerous individuals influential in English royal politics from the 13th to 15th centuries. The Domesday Book references four tenants in Wymington, two of which held manors. The larger of the two was held by one Walter the Fleming (possibly Walter of Douai), and was attached to the barony of Wahull at least until 1372, and possibly as late as 1515. Sometime after the Battle of Northampton in 1264, Henry III granted the manor to William de Columbers. Following the Dictum of Kenilworth in 1268, Columbers transferred the manor to Roger de Noers (also Nowers).

John Curteys took control of the de Noers manor by the 1350s. Curteys, who was mayor of the wool staple of Calais, was known to have held considerable wealth. He provided funds to re-build the village church, completed in 1377, and made a loan to Richard II in the sum of £20 in 1379, an extremely substantial amount at the time. The church is the only remaining medieval building in the village, and is a noted example of medieval British architecture. On Curteys's death in 1391, control of the manor passed to his wife, Albreda.

The village's connection to Richard II and the crown continued when Sir Thomas Brounflete (also Brounflet or Bromflet), the king's Chief Butler and cupbearer, was granted lord of the manor at Wymington in 1397 on Albreda Curteys's death. Brounflete would go on to be the comptroller of the household of Henry IV. Sir Thomas's son, Henry, inherited the manor in 1430, and was sent as an ambassador of Henry VI to the Council of Basel in 1434. In 1448, Henry VI made him Lord Vesci (or Veysey). When Henry died without a male heir in January, 1468, the manor and all of his other holdings in Bedfordshire and Buckingham was sold off by the executors of his estate, with the proceeds going to charity and to the church.

In the late 1500s Henry Stanley, the 4th Earl of Derby and grandson of Henry VII, came into possession of the manor. In 1591, Henry, and later his son Ferdinando Stanley, 5th Earl of Derby, began to sell off large portions of Wymington to the manor in Podington.

The second, smaller manor was held by Alured de Lincoln at the time of the Domesday survey. By 1215, the manor was held by Peter de Survive under the Archbishop of Dublin, shifting again in 1224 to a Robert de la Briwere for services rendered to the king. By 1328, John de Exmouth had obtained the manor, which passed to his heirs. In 1361, de Exmouth's line ended, and the manor was passed to John Curteys, merging the two manors.

=== Renaissance ===
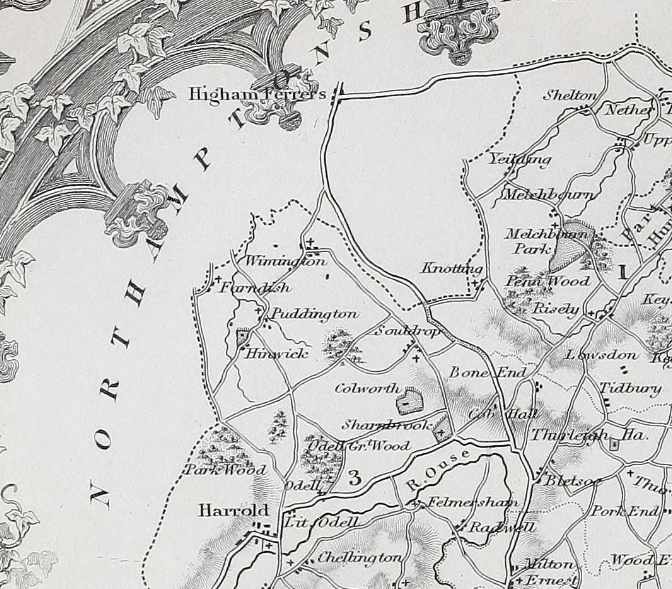
1838 map of northwestern Bedfordshire depicting Wymington, spelled as Wimington

By the early 17th century, Wymington was home to two manors, both referred to as Wymington Manor. Only one manor house remains, dating from 1612 on the north side of the village. The other manor house was probably on the opposite side of the village, on the south side of the High Street. By 1621, ownership of at least one of the manors, possibly both, was under one William Bletsoe. It remained in the Bletsoe family until it passed to a John Sawyer in 1708. In 1713, the manor was sold to Major General John Livesay, who had purchased nearby Hinwick House in 1706 and was a former governor of Jamaica.

=== Modern era ===
Wymington has hosted at least one football club in its history, the Wymington Stars. The organisation was founded before 1896, and fielded teams through until at least through 1931.

In the mid 18th century, Wymington was referenced as an "obscure and ruinous village," with 35 stone thatched houses and a population of 216. In 1811 the land of the parish was enclosed. By 1870, the number of houses in Wymington had risen to 71. Also in 1870, a second church was built in the village. This church, a Wesleyan chapel, was built to house a congregation that had been meeting in homes since 1833.

During the Second World War, families in and near Wymington took in children evacuated from urban areas in response to bombing raids, as was typical of many rural towns and villages. In August, 1944 a damaged United States Army Air Forces B-17 "Miss Liberty Belle" based at nearby RAF Chelveston crashed in the village while returning to base on its 65th mission. The aircraft, having sustained battle damage over Saarbrücken following a raid over Merkwiller, was placed into a holding pattern above the village while other aircraft could land at the airfield. While waiting for clearance to land, the aircraft lost power to all but one engine and began losing altitude quickly. The crew narrowly avoided the church tower and school, colliding with a stand of trees and landing in a field on the southern edge of the village. Eight civilians as well as a soldier of the Czech Army billeted nearby rushed to the crash site and were able to pull all the crew members from the flaming wreckage, though only one survived. A B-17G on display at the Grissom Air Museum is painted with the markings of the aircraft that crashed in Wymington.

In the mid-20th century, much of the old 16th to 18th century housing was demolished as part of a development project headed by the Rural Council. Council housing was constructed in the middle of the village along the High Street, and a housing estate was built to the south. Following the outbreak of bovine spongiform encephalopathy in the late 20th century, the industrial estate at Wymington was one of 11 designated storage sites for meat and bonemeal resulting from culled cattle before incineration.

== Geography and natural environment ==
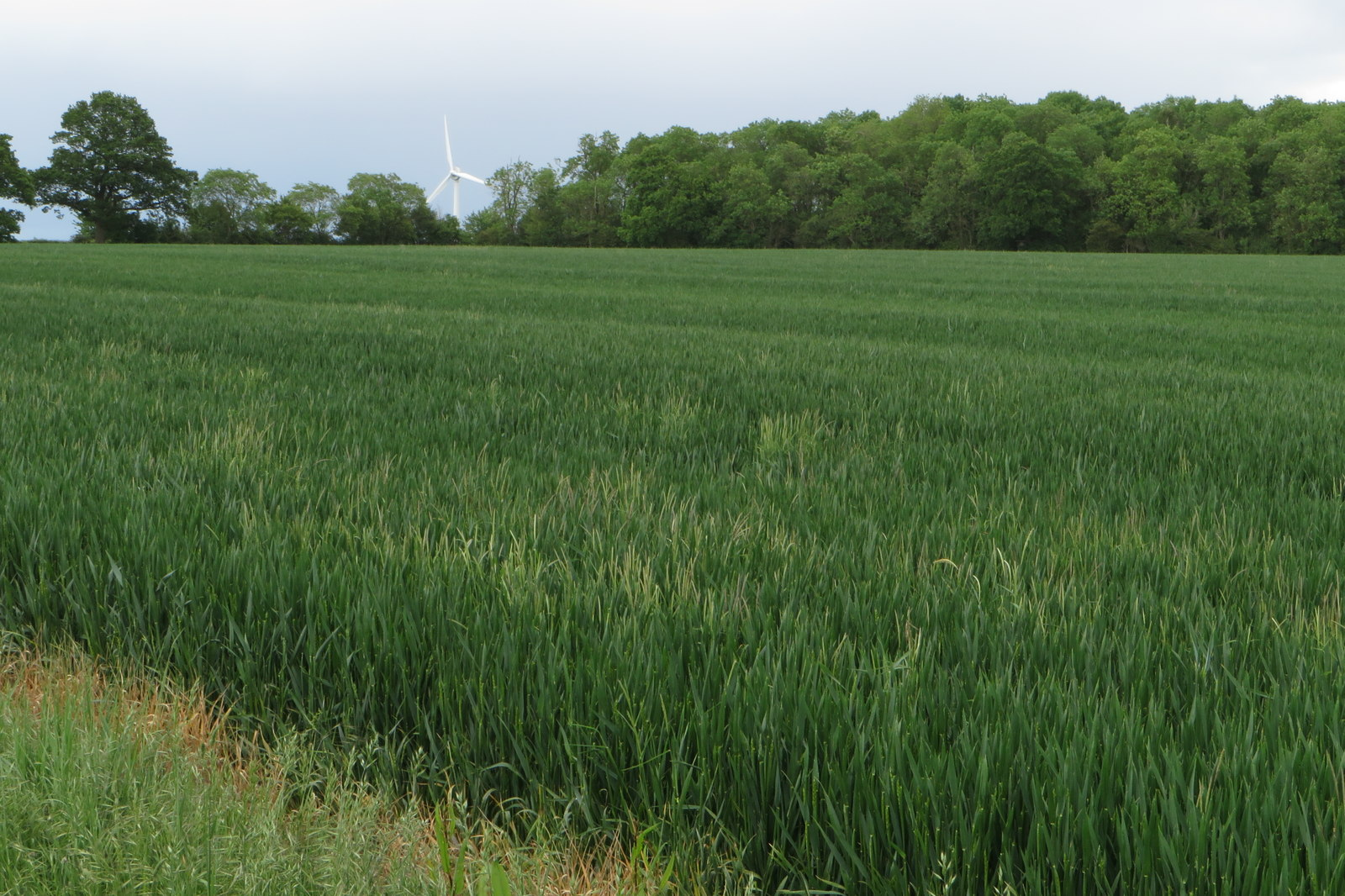
The edge of Great Hayes Wood as pictured from Podington

Wymington is situated in a far northwestern corner of Bedfordshire, with the parish boundary following the county line with Northamptonshire. The village has an area of 30 ha (74 acres). The town of Rushden is located immediately across the county line. A small brook runs through the village that drains into the River Nene about 3 miles (4.8 km) north. The central part of the village lies in a hollow, and much of the village is obscured from the nearby countryside by hills. While the village is surrounded by farms, the land was never considered suitable for market gardening as is common in the rest of northern Bedfordshire.

Sharnbrook Summit and Wymington Meadow nature reserves are located on the southern edge of Wymington along the rail right-of-way. The 10 hectares (25 acres) preserve is operated by The Wildlife Trusts and consists of two sections separated by the railway with walking paths and wildlife habitat. One segment, Sharnbrook Summit, is a small grassland atop the Wymington Deviation railway tunnel, while the other, Wymington Meadow, is composed of a small triangular wild grassland between the deviation and the main line. A Woodland Grant Scheme 3 associated woodland, Great Hayes Wood, is partially located in the far southern portion of the parish, and much of the parish's arable land is classified as part of the Countryside Stewardship Scheme.

== Infrastructure and transport ==
=== Roads ===
The village lies at the intersection of three roads. One leads southwest, crossing underneath the Midland Main Line railway towards the village of Podington 1.6 miles (2.6 km) away. Another leads north, crossing into Northamptonshire and passing through the village of Little Wymington before reaching central Rushden about 1.7 miles (2.7 km) away. A third leads to the east, connecting with the A6 1 mile (1.6 km) east of the village centre. One bus line stops in the village and provides service to Rushden and Bedford.

=== Rail ===
Though no station services the village, the Midland Main Line runs through the southern and western parts of the parish. The Wymington Deviation, a 3.5 miles (5.6 km) railway curve and tunnel constructed in 1884 to create a gentler grade for heavily laden trains, is located immediately to the south and west of the village.

== Government ==
Wymington parish is governed locally by an eight-member Parish Council. The council maintains a small chapel utilised as a meeting hall, a village hall, and cemetery. The parish is a part of the NU polling district in the Harrold Ward of the Bedford Borough Council. Since July 2024, Wymington has been represented in the Parliament of the United Kingdom by Richard Fuller, a Conservative. It is as part of the North Bedfordshire constituency, which was re-established for the 2024 United Kingdom general election.

== Demography ==
According to data from the 2021 United Kingdom census, Wymington Parish had a population of 1,000, with a density of 3,311 inhabitants per square kilometre (8,580/sq mi). Over 93% of the population is white. As of 2011, Wymington had the second lowest proportion of residents with a degree-level qualification, and some of the lowest rates of car ownership in Bedford Borough. The lack of nearby passenger rail access is reflected in the commuting patterns of residents, with 82% commuting via car (compared to 70% borough-wide), 6% via foot or bicycle, and less than 3% via train.

Population of Wymington
Year	1801	1811	1821	1831	1841	1851	1861	1871	1881	1891
Population	226	255	276	272	282	307	488	336	509	493
Year	1901	1911	1921	1931	1941	1951	1961	2001	2011	2021
Population	509	493	516	518	n/a	652	772	868	876	1000

== Economy and industry ==
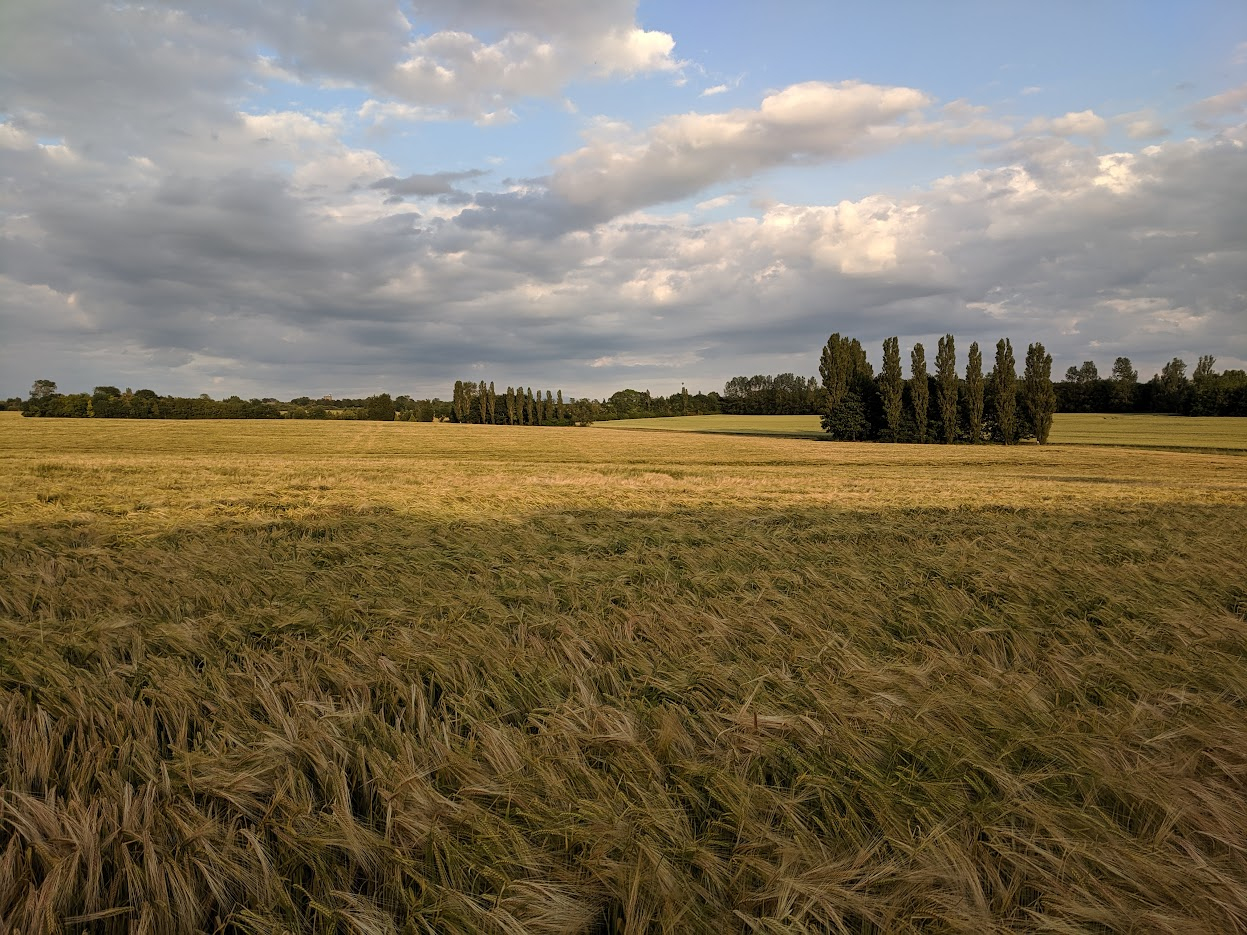
Agricultural land near Wymington

As with many rural English villages, the economy from ancient times until the Industrial Revolution was focused on manorial agriculture. By the 19th century, the shoe and boot industry in nearby Northamptonshire had led to the development of cottage shoemaking in the village and outside employment. By the late 20th century, however, with increased automation and the decline of shoe and boot making, the economy began to return to one supported by agriculture, small industry, and services.

An industrial estate, Goosey Lodge, is located on the outskirts of the village. Originally home to a large knackery and animal food processing plant, by the late 1980s an engineering firm had taken over operation of the site and transitioned to industrial engineering use. As of late 2023, planning was ongoing to convert 10.6 hectares (26 acres) of fields adjacent to the industrial estate to a 10.5 MW solar farm.

== Education ==
One school is located in the village, the St Lawrence Church of England Primary School, a voluntary aided day school associated with the Diocese of St Albans located on Manor Lane. As of 2024, the school enrolled 149 students aged three to 11, with a maximum capacity of 180 students. The school is overseen by a 12-member board of governors. The Ofsted inspection of 2021 resulted in a good rating for the school. The school was opened in 1878 in a former farm building adjacent to the church, replacing a previous day school that the village Rector had maintained since about 1869. About 80 students were originally enrolled in the school, with breaks taken for harvest. In 1966, the school underwent a major renovation and expansion.

== Landmarks ==
=== Grade I listed buildings ===
One grade I listed building is located in the village, the Parish Church of St. Lawrence. The medieval Gothic church was constructed in 1377 at the behest of John Curteys, a wealthy manor holder and mayor of the wool staple of Calais. It was built in the decorated style and is noted for its brasses and surviving late Medieval art, including a large doom painted over the chancel arch. Curteys died in 1391 and was buried in the church. The church is also home to the tomb of Sir Thomas Brounflete, cupbearer for Richard II and holder of the Wymington Manor. The funerary brass for Brounflete and his wife, Margaret, has been the subject of some academic study. It is considered one of the best late medieval depictions of a knight in full plate armor.

=== Grade II listed buildings ===
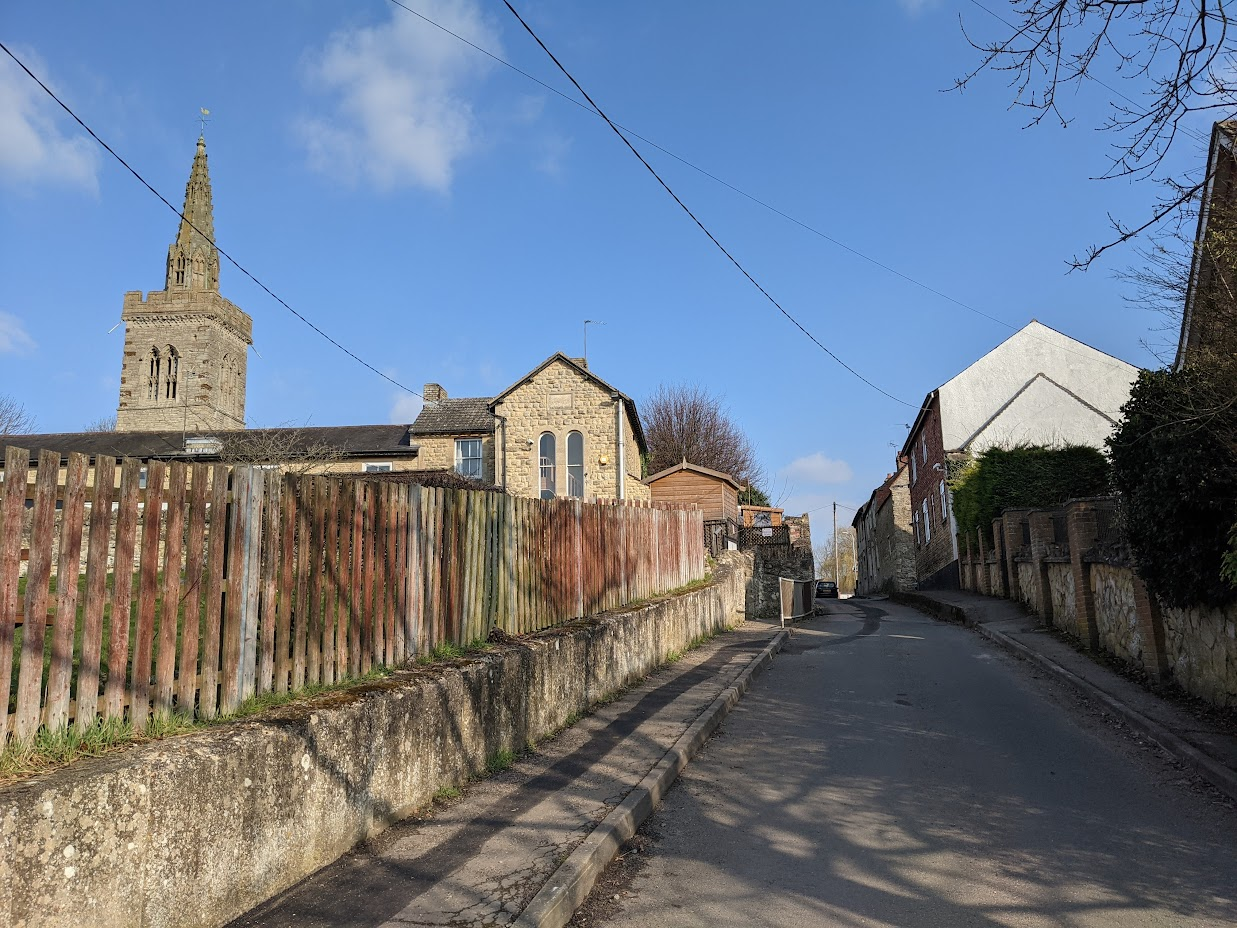
Church Lane in Wymington showing the Grade II listed cottages on the right

Three buildings in Wymington are Grade II listed:

- A pair of neighboring and connected coursed-limestone cottages with Welsh slate roofs, 5 and 7 Church Lane, that date from 1651.
- The 17th century manor house on Manor Lane.
- Poplars Farmhouse, which largely dates to the 1720s, but some parts date to the mid 17th century.

=== War memorials ===
A war memorial commemorating the men of the village killed in war resides in the church cemetery. The memorial, a 1.7 metres (5.6 ft) tall granite cross, holds the names of the 24 men who died in the First World War, and the names of the 8 killed in the Second World War. Additionally, the village hall was dedicated as a memorial to those killed in the wars.

A memorial to the crew of the B-17 that crashed in the village in 1944 sits in a grove south of the village. The memorial consists of a plaque, iron bench with the symbol of the Eighth Air Force, and a flagpole, and was dedicated on 7 May 2000. In August 2019 the village rededicated the memorial on the 75th anniversary of the crash. The rededication ceremony included representatives of the United States Air Force from nearby RAF Alconbury, the Royal British Legion, and military reenactors.

== Notable residents ==
- Jean Overton Fuller – Author and historian

== Notes ==
1.To navigate the MAGiC Map, search for Wymington in the top search bar, then select "Land Based Schemes > Agri-Environment Schemes > Countryside Stewardship Agreement Management Areas (England)" and "Land Based Schemes > Agri-Environment Schemes > Forestry and Woodland Schemes".
