= Lettie D. Campbell =

American politician

Member of the Wyoming House of Representatives from the Lincoln County district
- In office 1931–1933 Serving with R. H. Embree, A. E. Wilde, Platt Wilson

Personal details
- Party: Republican
- Relations: C. J. Dewey (brother)
- Profession: Politician

Lettie D. Campbell was an American politician from Afton, Wyoming, who served a single term in the Wyoming House of Representatives. She was elected in 1930, and represented Lincoln County from 1931 to 1933 (Note: According to the Wyoming Legislature, Campbell only served in 1931.) as a Republican in the 21st Wyoming Legislature. Campbell represented Lincoln County alongside R. H. Embree, A. E. Wilde, and Platt Wilson.

Campbell had a brother named C. J. Dewey.

== See also ==
- Lucile Connaghan, American politician who served in the Wyoming House of Representatives in the two subsequent Wyoming Legislatures
- Mable Mathews, American politician who served in the Wyoming House of Representatives in the preceding Wyoming Legislature

== Notes ==
Wyoming House of Representatives
Preceded by —	Member of the Wyoming House of Representatives from the Lincoln County district 1931–1933; Served alongside: R. H. Embree, A. E. Wilde, Platt Wilson	Succeeded by —
