= Latisha McCrudden =

Irish activist

Latisha McCrudden (born 2003 or 2004) is an Irish activist and public speaker known for her advocacy on mental health, Irish Traveller rights, and women's rights. She has spoken publicly on Traveller access to education, including addressing the Seanad Éireann in 2024. McCrudden was named to BBC 100 Women in 2024 and has received multiple youth and community recognition awards for her activism.

== Early life and education ==
McCrudden was born to an Irish Traveller mother and non-Traveller father, and was an only child until age ten. Her mother had married at age 17, and her maternal grandmother had married at age 15. McCrudden's grandmother encouraged her to focus on her education. McCrudden grew up in Cloontowart, Lisacul, and attended the village primary school, where she was the only Traveller child. She loved school, seeing it as an escape from the domestic abuse she witnessed at home.

As a young teenager, McCrudden struggled with depression, noting in 2023 that "when I was 14, there was a time I thought I wouldn’t make it to my 15th birthday". She attended sessions at Pieta House, which she found helpful.

McCrudden is currently a second-year law student at the University of Galway.

== Activism ==
McCrudden became involved in activism at age 15, while experiencing the COVID-19 pandemic lockdowns. She joined the youth panels of Minceir Whiden and the Irish Traveller Movement. Her Traveller-related activism has taken two fronts: working to improve conditions and political engagement within the community, and speaking out against discrimination of Travellers. In April 2024, she spoke at the Seanad on Traveller access to education.

In 2022 she joined a national project analyzing the impacts of the COVID-19 pandemic on children, focusing personally on how Traveller children are impacted by the pandemic. In June 2024, she was named to the Córas Iompair Éireann’s (CIÉ) Youth Board.

Since 2024, McCrudden has co-hosted the podcast Mincéirs: Paving the Way with Emma Ward. The podcast, released by Spun Out, focuses on Traveller experiences.

== Awards and recognition ==
- Gaisce Bronze Awardee
- Pope John Paul II award
- 2022 National Traveller Pride Education Award
- Special Achievement Award, 2023 National Garda Youth Awards
- 2024 Alice Academy for Activists
- 2024 Best First Year at the University of Galway
- 2024 Access Champion of the Year award, Union of Student Awards of Ireland
- 2024 100 women changing Ireland today, Irish Examiner
- 2024 Tatler Women of the Year Awards, Irish Tatler
- BBC 100 Women 2024
- 2026 Young Volunteer of the Year, Galway City Council’s Mayor’s Awards

== Personal life ==
McCrudden is Roman Catholic.

At age nine, McCrudden began suffering migraines as the result of a tumour on her skull. After a surgery to remove the tumour at Beaumont Hospital, she was diagnosed with fibrous dysplasia.

McCrudden has practiced karate since age four, and is a black belt.
