= Elizabeth Pipe Wolferstan =

English novelist and poet (1763–1845)

Elizabeth Pipe-Wolferstan (1763–1845), also known as Elizabeth Jervis, was an English novelist and poet.

== Life ==
Elizabeth Jervis was born in London in 1763 and spent her pre-marriage years in Leicestershire. Her father, Philip Jervis, was a successful silk-mill owner, and the family was comfortably seated at an estate in Netherseal. In 1796, she anonymously published a novel called Agatha; or a narrative of recent events. Reviews were, perhaps, unjustly critical of a new novel by a new novelist. The same year, on her birthday, she married Tamworth lawyer Samuel Pipe-Wolferstan. She published nothing further until after his death in 1820. At some time in the early nineteenth century, she taught schoolchildren in Tamworth, including her niece, another Elizabeth Jervis.

Agatha was translated into French, and, later, into Dutch, from the French edition. A Latin and French scholar, Pipe-Wolferstan wrote several slim volumes of poetry including the entertaining Fairy Tales in verse published in 1829. She is featured in the new University of Colorado Boulder online collection of women Romantic poets.

== Works ==
- Agatha; or, a Narrative of Recent Events, 3 vols, 1896
- The enchanted flute, with other poems : and fables from La Fontaine, 1823
- Eugenia; a poem, 1824
- The Fable of Phaeton, translated from Ovid, 1828
- Fairy tales, in verse, 1829.
- Old Stories Versified, 1842
