= Celebrity Number Six =

Solved lost media mystery

The image of fabric posted to the internet (left) and the original image of Leticia Sardá

Celebrity Number Six (sometimes abbreviated C6) is the name given to a previously unidentified face on a fabric print, the subject of a years-long online search. In 2020, Redditor (Reddit user) TontsaH posted to the subreddit r/TipOfMyTongue asking for help in identifying eight faces depicted on a set of curtains. While seven were quickly identified as actors and models prominent in the mid-2000s, one – the sixth, as numbered by TontsaH – proved far more difficult to identify, leading to the creation of a dedicated subreddit, r/CelebrityNumberSix.

Members of r/CelebrityNumberSix pursued hundreds of ultimately fruitless leads for four years, including contacting the fabric's supplier, reviewing a decade's worth of photos on Getty Images taken by the photographers of the other seven images, and various forms of image manipulation and reverse image searching. In 2024, Redditor StefanMorse identified Spanish model Leticia Sardá as a likely candidate by running a colored-in version of the print through the facial recognition tool PimEyes. On 8 September, user IndigoRoom posted the original photo, taken by Leandre Escorsell in 2006; IndigoRoom had contacted Escorsell because he was known to have photographed Sardá. The next day, Sardá, who had retired from modeling in 2009, posted a picture of herself holding the image. She has since sold copies of the image and resumed modeling.

The successful identification was one of several "lost media" mysteries solved in 2024, including the origins of the song "Ulterior Motives", and the original Backrooms image. There was initially a dispute among the subreddit's members as to whether IndigoRoom's post was a hoax perpetrated using generative artificial intelligence. Commentators discussed how AI both made the find and others like it possible and, through increasingly plausible deepfakes, could hinder the solving of similar mysteries in the future.

== Origins and unsuccessful efforts to identify ==
On 27 January 2020, Finnish Reddit user TontsaH posted to the subreddit r/TipOfMyTongue, asking for help identifying the celebrities printed on a set of curtains. They said their grandmother had made the curtains from fabric purchased from a local store in "maybe ... 2008". The curtain consisted of eight prints repeating in black or blue. Seven were quickly identified as Josh Holloway, Jessica Alba, Travis Fimmel, Ian Somerhalder, Orlando Bloom, and Adriana Lima (twice), but one of the faces, dubbed Celebrity Number Six, could not be identified. The designs seemed to have been adapted from photographs using software like Adobe Illustrator.

The source photos for the other six figures were also quickly tracked down, all having been taken between 2003 and 2007 – both Holloway and Somerhalder appeared on Lost, which was popular around the same time. However, users struggled to pin down the missing face or its reference photo – even the gender of Celebrity Number Six was not agreed on by users, although female seemed more plausible to them. TontsaH soon posted to 15 subreddits looking for an answer, and the subreddit r/CelebrityNumberSix was created to continue the search. The COVID-19 pandemic began shortly thereafter; Candice Lim of Slate characterizes the Celebrity Number Six as a "light" in the "dark place" of the Internet in the following years.

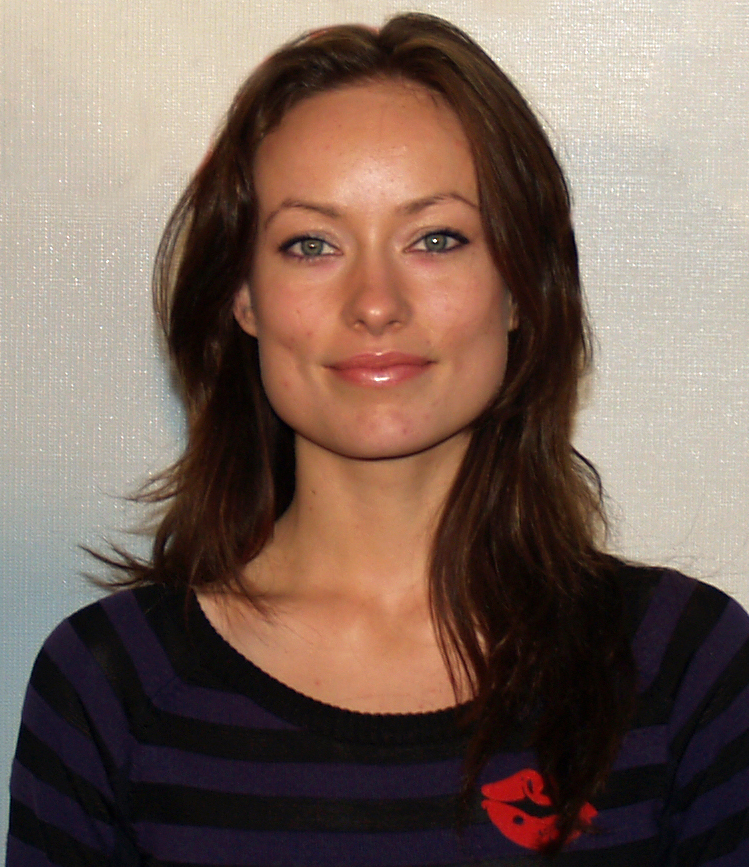
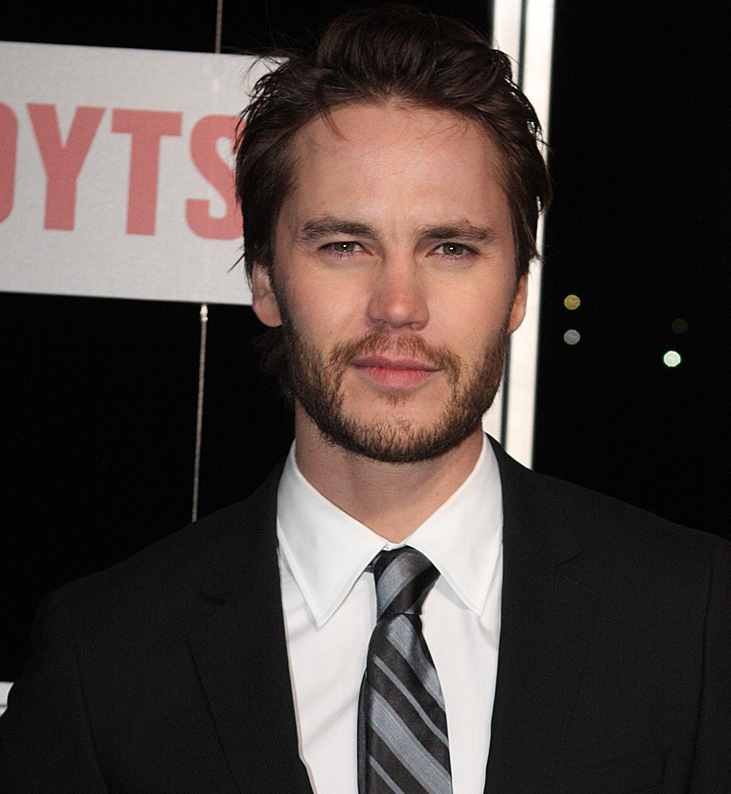
r/CelebrityNumberSix participants could not agree on the depicted person's gender, with both Olivia Wilde (left) and Taylor Kitsch suggested as answers.

Redditors approached the mystery from multiple avenues, pursuing hundreds of leads. Some prominent speculation focused on potential lookalikes who were also popular around the same time period, such as Olivia Wilde of House or Taylor Kitsch of Friday Night Lights, but matching photographs could not be found. Others attempted to track the photograph directly, with one Redditor reviewing all photographs on Getty Images between 1998 and 2007 that share a photographer with one of the known matches.

Redditors found that the curtain came from the Finnish department store Anttila, appearing in its Summer 2009 catalog, and that it was supplied by Látky Mráz in the Czech Republic. However, Látky Mráz did not provide the designer's name. Other attempts, according to a summary post on Reddit, involved reverse image searching, reverse image searching of digitally modified images, advertising the search on other internet communities, using the Wayback Machine to get more information out of seller websites, and having Pinterest recommend similar images. Community members compiled spreadsheets of possible answers.

== Identification as Leticia Sardá ==
As efforts progressed to identify Celebrity Number Six, people were able to replicate the process used to turn the photographs into monochrome, and then attempted to reverse that process. Reddit user StefanMorse colored in the Celebrity Number Six image to resemble a photograph and ran it through PimEyes, a facial recognition tool. StefanMorse did not use any artificial intelligence in the editing process, saying it "doesn't help with shit and just slows down the search". Of the many results PimEyes gave, seven – a plurality – were for Leticia Sardá, a Spanish model.

- Sardá in 2024 holding up a print of the original photo
- Sardá on the front cover of Tendencias Woman, Summer 2006

A Spaniard who occasionally participated in the subreddit, IndigoRoom, then contacted Leandre Escorsell, who had photographed Sardá for the cover of a 2006 Tendencias ('trends') insert in the Spanish magazine Woman, (Note: Some sources incorrectly refer to the insert as a magazine, sometimes hypercorrecting its name to the fully Spanish Tendencias Mujer. Per Vanity Fair's Spanish edition, the photo was "on the cover of a trends supplement that accompanied issue 162 of Woman magazine" (original Spanish: "en la portada de un suplemento de tendencias que acompañó al número 162 de la revista Woman"; hyperlink in original).) and asked if he recognized the print. Escorsell said that he had taken the photo himself. He expressed frustration that the image had been used on the print without his permission and surprise that anyone had found the original, which had never appeared on the Internet. On 8 September, IndigoRoom posted "Celebrity Number Six has been found" to r/CelebrityNumberSix, showing a copy of the photo provided by Escorsell.

When IndigoRoom posted to the subreddit's Discord server, several members suggested that the image was AI-generated or otherwise falsified, causing tension within the community. According to Angela Watercutter in Wired, the exact details of the dispute were murky, but it involved controversy with the moderators on both Reddit and Discord. However, on 9 September, after being contacted on LinkedIn by a Croatian Redditor, Sardá confirmed that she was the woman in the photo, posting an image of herself holding a copy of it. A moderator who had been in conflict with IndigoRoom resigned around the same time, as other moderators spoke of receiving "disgusting messages and threats". (Note: alnilam42 (11 September 2024). "PSA". r/CelebrityNumberSix. Archived from the original on 9 October 2024 – via Reddit.)

IndigoRoom told El País that next to all of the famous faces, he "was surprised to find the Spanish name of a model I had never heard of". Some suggest that Sardá may have been confused for Lost's Evangeline Lilly; Candice Lim notes that Sardá modelled with Ian Somerhalder, also of Lost. Juan Claudio Mattosian wrote in Vanity Fair that the print designer might have simply liked the photo, but also comments that the designer remains anonymous and probably will not identify themselves, given the photo's apparent unlicensed usage.

== Sardá's reaction ==
So many of these people have been looking for me for so long and taking effort to find me. It makes me happy in a certain way. It makes me worried also. I'm trying to give them what they were looking for because they made a lot of effort, you know, just to find a person on a fabric.

— Sardá, as quoted in The New York Times

Sardá, born in 1980, had quit modeling in 2009 due to the illness of her grandmother and returned to her native Santa Cruz de Tenerife. As of her identification as Celebrity Number Six, she was working as a waitress at a café, living, in her words, "a quiet life with my children, my little house, my little job", far removed from her past as a model. The Redditor who initially contacted her asked, "Are you aware that there are about 50,000 people who have been looking for you for five years?" She told The New York Times that the interaction initially unnerved her as she had been unaware of the search; she said that after she asked who he was, "he tried to explain, but I didn't realize it was going to be so big". She found the image in an old portfolio of her work.

Sardá told Vanity Fair that she used Facebook to stay in touch with four friends and occasionally browsed Instagram, but was not active on Reddit and LinkedIn, where many people were contacting her. She received local attention as well, with some people on the street offering to manage her social media for her. She created accounts on a number of social media sites and expressed interest in making TikTok videos, saying that if going viral became an issue, "I can always hide."

Sardá and Escorsell, speaking to the media, both complimented the Redditors they interacted with for their politeness. On 15 September, Sardá hosted an AMA ("Ask Me Anything") on r/CelebrityNumberSix, in which she expressed that, after adjusting to the shock, she was "having fun" with her sudden fame and thanked the subreddit's members for having changed her life. The subreddit's moderators created a GoFundMe for Sardá. Sardá sold prints of the original photo and began modeling on Instagram for the Spanish fashion label 7.rooms.

== Legacy ==
Several lost media mysteries were resolved in 2024 by internet users, including the origins of the song "Ulterior Motives" and the original Backrooms image. After Celebrity Number Six was identified, people from similar communities began posting to the subreddit, looking for help with their own investigations. Kurt Luther, director of the Crowd Intelligence Lab at Virginia Tech, expressed optimism that those investigations would be resolved, crediting the diverse set of skills that amateur sleuths bring to their communities. Solving "esoteric, low-stakes myster[ies]" like Celebrity Number Six has become, according to journalist Caitlin Dewey, "something of a participant sport" on social media, like "catnip for a certain type of Reddit user". Lim theorized that this mystery in particular was attractive to Redditors because if Celebrity Number Six really was famous, identifying them would have restored the memory of that person to the public consciousness, and Redditors could empathize with not wanting to be forgotten or lost.

Solving lost media mysteries has increasingly involved the use of facial recognition and other artificial intelligence. Luther said that solutions to mysteries like Celebrity Number Six are "being done in a way that wouldn't have been possible even a few years ago". Angela Watercutter looked at the role of AI from a different perspective, characterizing the authenticity dispute, and similar speculation that "Ulterior Motives" had been AI-generated, as showing that "the internet is now even more untrustworthy than it used to be". Jason Koebler of 404 Media called the identification of Sardá "a frivolous answer to a frivolous mystery" but similarly found it significant due to the role of AI. He reasoned that as generative AI becomes increasingly able to create images that look like real photographs, the proliferation of such deepfake will "dilute the conversation" in future searches.

Koebler also remarked on the use of traditional journalistic methods, with Celebrity Number Six ultimately being found "with a combination of AI facial recognition software and one photographer's long memory". Emma Keates of The A.V. Club called mysteries like Celebrity Number Six "one of the last great bastions of the early days of the internet", but speculated that they would become less common in time "as the world moves further away from not just physical media but reality itself", citing the use of AI-generated images in ads for the film Civil War and in the documentary What Jennifer Did.
