= Laetitia (goddess) =

Minor Roman goddess of gaiety

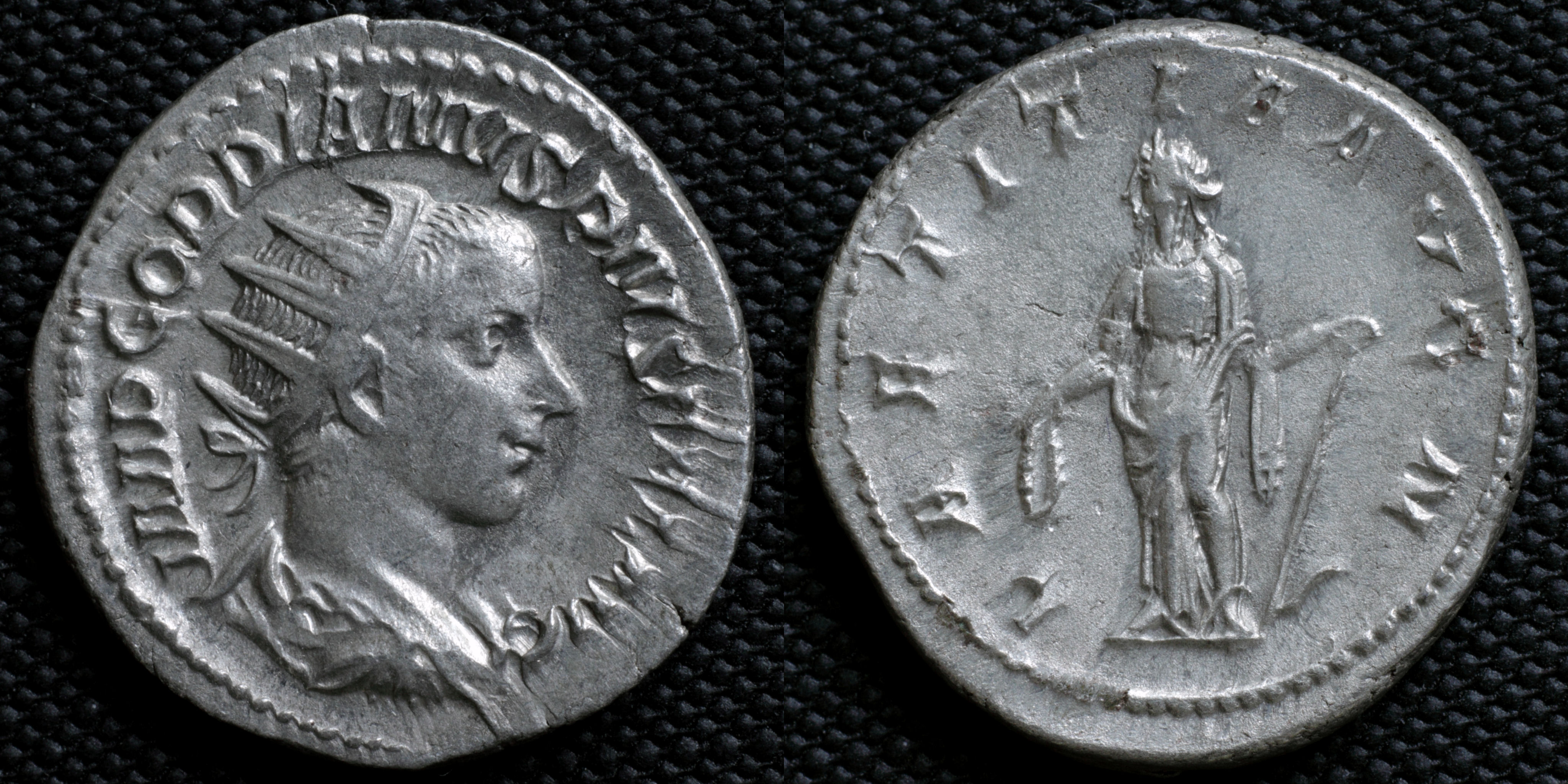

First side of the image: O: draped and cuirassed bust with radiate crown IMP GORDIANVS PIVS FEL AVG
Second side of the image: R: Laetitia holding wreath and anchor

LAETITIA AVG N

(Joy of our Emperor)
silver antoninianus struck by Gordian III in Rome late 240 - July 243 AD; ref.: RIC 86

In Roman mythology, Laetitia, also spelled Laëtitia, was a minor goddess and the personification of happiness and celebration.

== Etymology ==
Laetitia is derived from laetus ("happy"), with the added feminine modifier -itia. The exact origins of laetus is unknown. Laetitia broadly means "joy," "pleasure," "exultation," "delight," and "gladness." It could also be used to denote a "pleasing appearance" or "sweetness" of speech, and the "fertility" of plants or soils. The 6th century philosopher Boethius connected laetitia to similar concepts that represented abstract forces of good, including sufficientia, reverentia, potentia, and claritudo.

== Depictions ==
Laetitia was most commonly depicted as a woman holding a wreath or garland in one hand and resting the other hand on an anchor or ship's rudder. As she was frequently depicted with sea and ship-related motifs, Laetitia may have been associated with seafaring.

The image was occasionally modified; she is holding a cornucopia on an antoninianus minted by the emperor Claudius Gothicus, a symbol commonly associated with the goddess Fortuna. Coins minted by the emperors Septimius Severus, Caracalla, and Geta— who were family and members of the Severan dynasty— depict a ship unloading exotic animals, including tigers and lions. These coins are inscribed with LAETITIA AVG ("joy of the emperor"). On the reverse of a denarius depicting the empress Julia Maesa, Laetitia is shown holding a globe. This coin is inscribed with LAETITIA PVBL ("joy of the public"), potentially implying that the Roman population finds joy in the expansion of the Empire.

== See also ==
- 39 Laetitia
- Ludi saeculares
- Tyche
